= Agreement on Military Confidence Building Measures, 1996 =

Agreement Between the Government of the Republic of India and the Government of the People's Republic of China on Confidence-Building Measures in the Military Field Along the Line of Actual Control in the India-China Border Areas
- Type: Standstill agreement Border management Confidence building measures
- Context: India China boundary question
- Signed: 29 November 1996
- Location: New Delhi, India
- Condition: Ratification by China and India
- Parties: China; India
- Languages: Chinese; English; Hindi

The Agreement on Military Confidence Building Measures (formally the Agreement Between the Government of the Republic of India and the Government of the People's Republic of China on Confidence-Building Measures in the Military Field Along the Line of Actual Control in the India-China Border Areas) followed the 1993 border agreement. The Instruments of Ratification were exchanged during the tenth meeting of JWG in August 1997.

== Background ==
Following the 1993 agreement, formal interaction between the two countries continued. In the military sphere, an officer exchange program and high level visits took place. Vice Chief of China's People's Liberation Army and the Chinese Defence Minister visited India while India's Chief of Army Staff and Chief of Naval Staff visited China.

== Agreement ==
The agreement was signed in New Delhi during a state visit by the President of China. This was the first visit of a Chinese President to India. The agreement opened with a mention of the five principles of peaceful coexistence as well as the 1993 agreement. The twelve articles make it understood that the agreement is a no war agreement, that the ultimate solution to the boundary question remains and that the LAC shall be respected. It states that military deployment shall be limited and details on how to deal with military exercises, air intrusions, overflights and landings by military aircraft near the LAC. It aims to prevent "dangerous military activities" near LAC, covers CBMs such as "flag meetings and telecommunications" and deals with the accidental crossing of the LAC. It reiterates that clarification can be sought with regard to the agreement and LAC and issues of ratification. The agreement recognizes that there are differing perceptions in certain areas along the LAC.

=== Exchange of maps ===
Article 10 of the agreement mentioned the exchange of maps between the two countries. Initially there had been some progress with the exchange of maps. India and China exchanged maps of the Barahoti sector during the latter part of 2000. In June 2001 the Indian and Chinese sides had the first in-depth discussion on the LAC in the central sector. Maps of Sikkim were also exchanged. This resulted in the "Memorandum on Expanding Border Trade". However, as maps of other sectors were exchanged, especially the western sector, perceptions vastly differed to a point where the process stopped around 2002/2003. In July 2020 the Chinese ambassador to India said that Beijing isn't interested in continuing with the exchange of maps process which had stopped in 2002. A drawback of the process of exchanging maps was that it gave an "incentive to exaggerate their claims of where the LAC lay".

== See also ==
- India China border agreements
  - 1988: India-China Joint Working Group on the boundary question
  - Confidence building measures
    - 1993: Border Peace and Tranquility Agreement
    - 1996: Agreement on Military Confidence Building Measures
    - 2005: Protocol for the Implementation of Military Confidence Building Measures
  - Political measures
    - 2003: Declaration on Principles for Relations and Comprehensive Cooperation
    - 2005: Agreement on the Political Parameters and Guiding Principles for the Settlement of the India-China Boundary Question
  - 2012: Agreement on the Establishment of a Working Mechanism for Consultation and Coordination on India-China Border Affairs
  - 2013: Border Defence Cooperation Agreement
  - 2020: 5-point statement
