= Timeline of the 2020–2022 China–India skirmishes =

In early May 2020, troops of the People's Liberation Army and Indian Army engaged in melee at locations along the notional Line of Actual Control (LAC), the disputed boundary between China and India. It escalated on 15/16 June 2020 resulting in deaths on both sides. Indian sources reported the deaths of 20 Indian soldiers and casualties of at least 45 Chinese soldiers. China reported 4 deaths. On 7 September, for the first time in 45 years, shots were fired along the LAC, with both sides blaming each other for the firing. Indian media also reported that Indian troops fired warning shots at the PLA on 30 August.

Most experts point out that Indian infrastructure construction along the LAC troubled the Chinese and was one of the multiple major triggers. Multiple rounds of diplomatic and military talks followed, including the corps-commander-level meetings, and meetings of existing border dispute management and resolution mechanisms. The 13th round of corps-commander talks took place on 10 October 2021. Incomplete, partial and complete disengagement and de-escalation has been announced at various locations respectively.

The 2020–2022 China–India skirmishes are a part of the larger Sino-Indian border dispute. This is a timeline of events that stretches over the period of the 2020–2022 China–India skirmishes.

== 2020 ==
May

- 5 – Violent confrontation between rival Chinese and Indian patrols Pangong Tso.
- 6 – Foreign Secretary of India Harsh Vardhan Shringla calls Chinese Ambassador Sun Weidong to India.
- 9 – Skirmish in Naku La area, Sikkim. Injuries on both sides.
- 26 – Chinese Communist Party general secretary Xi Jinping meets People's Liberation Army (PLA) representatives during an annual meeting. Indian Prime Minister Narendra Modi reviews the situation in Ladakh.
- 28 – In a press conference, Indian Ministry of External Affairs (MEA) spokesperson maintained that there were enough bilateral mechanisms to solve border disputes diplomatically.
- 30 – The Indian Defence Minister Rajnath Singh says bilateral talks at a diplomatic and military level have begun.

June

- 2 – Major-general level talks, initially talks at Border Personnel Meeting (BPM) points between colonels and later brigadiers were also held.
- 6 – First three-star corps-commanders level talks at Chushul-Moldo BPM point.
- 12 – Major-general level officers meet.
- 15 – Galwan valley clash. Both China and India admit casualties.
- 15 – Major-general level officers meet at Patrol Point (PP) 14 near Galwan, more major-general level talks on the 16, 17, and 18th.
- 17 – Indian Prime Minister Modi addresses the nation regarding the Galwan skirmish.
- 17 – Chinese Foreign Minister Wang Yi warns India.
- 22 – Second round of corps-commanders' talks.
- 24 – 15th virtual meeting of the Working Mechanism for Consultation and Coordination on China-India Border Affairs (WMCC).
- 26 – Sun Weidong says that 'onus of de-escalation is on India'.
- 30 – Third round of corps-commanders' talks.

July

- 3 – Indian Prime Minister Modi visits military posts in Ladakh and delivers a speech saying that the "age of expansionism" is over.
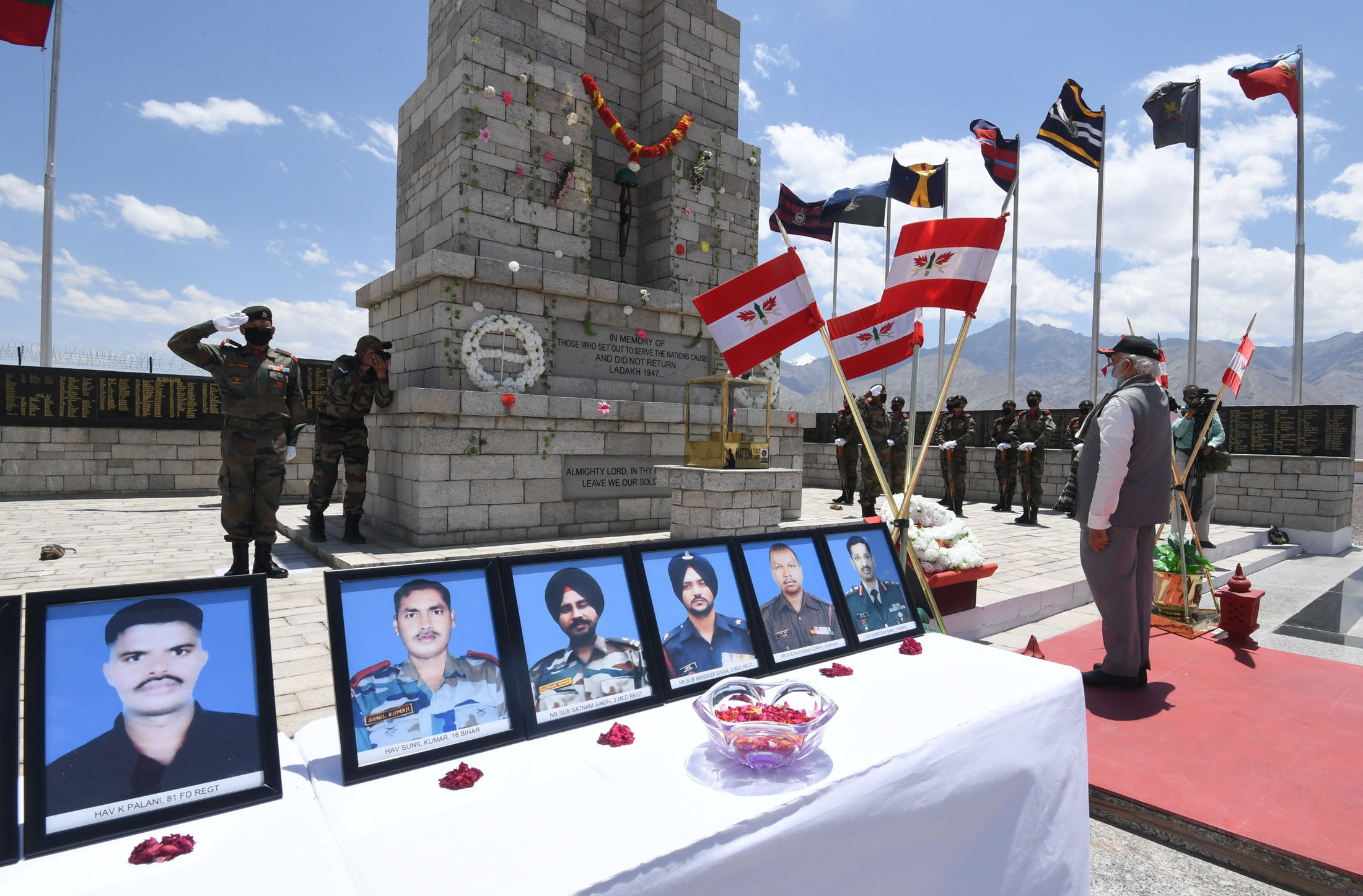
  PM Modi paying tribute to the fallen soldiers in Ladakh. B. Santosh Babu can be seen in the photograph closest to the Prime Minister.
- 3 – China's Ministry of Foreign Affairs (MFA) says India should avoid a "strategic miscalculation" with regard to China.
- 5 – Discussion between special representatives (SRs) National Security Advisor of India, Ajit Doval and Foreign Minister of China, Wang Yi.
- 10 – Chinese Ambassador to India warns India.
- 10 – 16th WMCC meeting.
- 14 – Fourth round of corps-commanders talks.
- 24 – Diplomatic talks between the two countries regarding disengagement.
- 28 – Chinese MFA states disengagement at most locations completed and "the situation on the ground is de-escalating and the temperature on the ground is coming down".
- 30 – Indian MEA states, "there has been some progress towards this objective but the disengagement process has not been completed".
- 30 – Chinese ambassador Sun Weidong claimed that unilaterally clarifying the LAC would cause more disputes.

August

- 2 – Fifth round of three-star general-level China India talks at Chushul-Moldo BPM point.
- 5 – China Study Group announces that China's "mutual and equal" disengagement proposal at Pangong Tso is unacceptable.
- 8 – Major-general level talks at BPM DBO.
- 14 – Chinese Foreign Minister Wang Yi visits Tibet.
- 20 – WMCC virtual meeting.
- 29/30 – India takes control of multiple heights along the Kailash Range. Indian Army and PLA face-off for the first time on the southern bank of Pangong Tso.

September

- 1 – Brigade commander-level meeting at Chushul-Moldo to discuss 29/30 August tension at Chushul.
- 1 – Foreign ministry spokespersons of both China and India deliver statements on 29/30 August tension at Chushul.
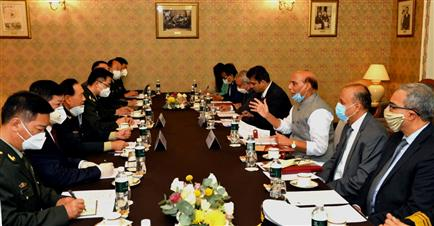
- India and China hold high-level talks on 4 September 2020, Moscow
  4 – Indian Defence Minister Rajnath Singh and his Chinese counterpart General Wei Fenghe hold talks on the sidelines of a Shanghai Cooperation Organisation meeting.
- 5 – Brigadier-level talks at Chushul for de-escalation on the south bank of Pangong Tso fail.
- 7 – China and India blame each other for firing warning shots on the south bank of Pangong Tso.
- 10 – Foreign affairs ministers of China and India meet in Moscow and agree upon five point joint statement.
- 22 – Sixth round of corps-commanders commanders meeting takes place. Indian MEA and Indo-Tibetan Border Police representatives were also part of the talks.
- 30 – Fifth round of diplomatic talks took place; overall this was the 19th meeting of the WMCC; WMCC's sixth virtual meeting during these skirmishes.

October

- 13 – Seventh round of corps-commanders talks in Chushul.
- 19 – A Chinese soldier identified as Corporal Wang Ya Long apprehended after he inadvertently crosses over into Indian territory in the Demchok sector of eastern Ladakh.
- 21 – Corporal Wang Ya Long released from Indian custody after completion of due protocols and formalities.

November

- 6 – Eighth round of corps-commanders talks in Chushul.

December

- 18 – Another round of WMCC talks take place.

== 2021 ==
January

- 6 – Indian Defence Ministry's year end review for 2020 mentions usage of "unorthodox weapons" by China.
- 9 – A Chinese soldier was captured in Ladakh by the Indian Army. The soldier was returned on 11 January.
- 20 – A "minor" border clash took place in Naku La, Sikkim. Chinese mouthpiece and foreign ministry spokesperson denies any information about clash.
- 24 – Ninth round of corps-commanders talks.

February

- 10 – Russian News Agency TASS reports that at least '45 Chinese servicemen' were killed in May and June 2020.
- 11 – Initial and partial disengagement of Indian and Chinese troops near Pangong Lake takes place.
- 19 – China announces the deaths of four of its soldiers during the 2020 Galwan clash.
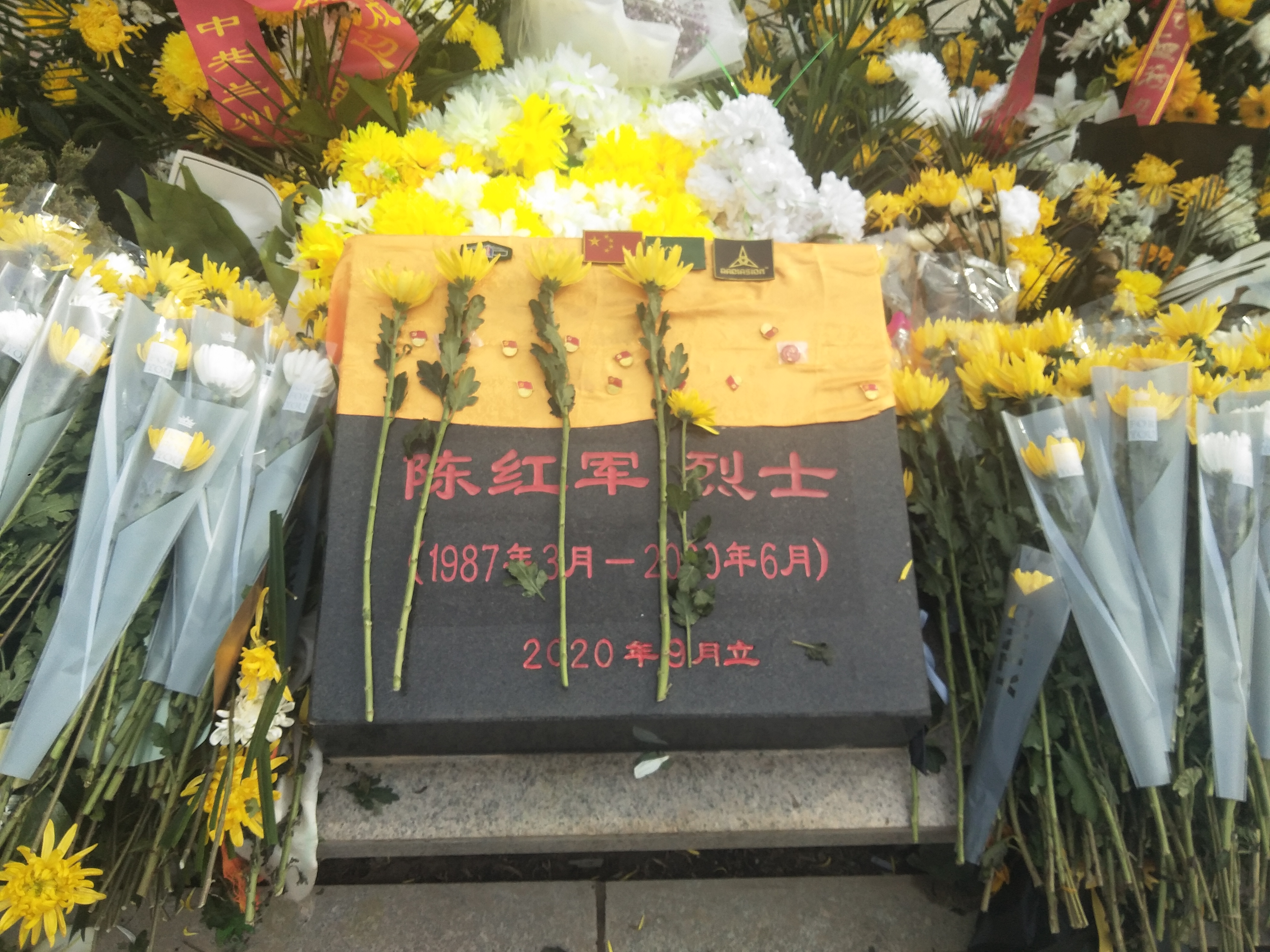
  The tombstone of PLA Battalion Commander Chen Hongjun, awarded the July 1 Medal posthumously for defending Galwan.
- 21 – Tenth round of corps-commanders talks. India's Ministry of External Affairs publishes joint press release.
- 22 – Both Chinese and Indian troops complete the pull-back of forces from Pangong Lake.
- 24 – Indian Army Chief Naravane states that de-escalation is "still a long way off".

March

- 31 – No change in posture of Indian Air Force or PLA Air Force.

April

- 9 – Eleventh round of corps-commanders talks.

May

- 23 – The Indian Army denies a report published in The Hindu about a minor face-off taking place in Galwan in early May 2021.

July

- 13 – In "pin-prick tactics", PLA troops enter Demchok sector and protest against Dalai Lama's birthday; a village community center was marking the occasion.
- 26 – Chinese "civilians" enter Indian area at Charding Nala in Demchok sector and set up tents and refuse to leave.
- 31 – Twelfth round of corps-commanders talks.

August

- 1 – India and China set up a new military hotline.
- 6 – A press release of a joint statement was published via Press Information Bureau of India stating disengagement at Gogra. However analysts pointed out that some PLA structures were still visible through satellite imagery.

October

- 10 – Thirteenth round of corps-commanders talks.

December

- China and India continue to maintain and expand their border infrastructure.

== 2022 ==
January

- 4 – Construction and upgradation of border infrastructure continues. China began construction of a bridge on the Pangong Tso, around 40 kilometres from the LAC in that area. India inaugurated the Umling La section of the Chisumle-Demchok road during the previous week.
- 12 – Fourteenth round of corps-commanders talks. Joint statement issued unlike the last meet when independent statements were issued.
- 26 – Both countries mark India's Republic Day at Chushul-Moldo and DBO-TWD border personnel meeting points.

February

- 15 - India banned 54 more apps that were duplicates of the apps it had banned

December

- 9 –The Indian army said there had been a clash in the Tawang sector of Arunachal Pradesh state

== See also ==
Indian PM: Nehru
Indira Gandhi
I. Gandhi
R. Gandhi
Narasimha Rao
Vajpayee
Manmohan Singh
Narendra Modi
Leader CCP: Mao Zedong
Hua Guofeng
Hu Yaobang
Zhao Ziyang
Jiang Zemin
Hu Jintao
Xi Jinping
8 rounds border talks
15 rounds JWG talks
22 rounds SR talks
20 rounds WMCC talks
│
1955
│
1960
│
1965
│
1970
│
1975
│
1980
│
1985
│
1990
│
1995
│
2000
│
2005
│
2010
│
2015
│
2020
India China border relations since 1962. Major border incidents and border diplomacy.
