= Sino-Indian border dispute =

Border dispute between China and India

Sino–Indian border dispute
- Part of the Kashmir conflict
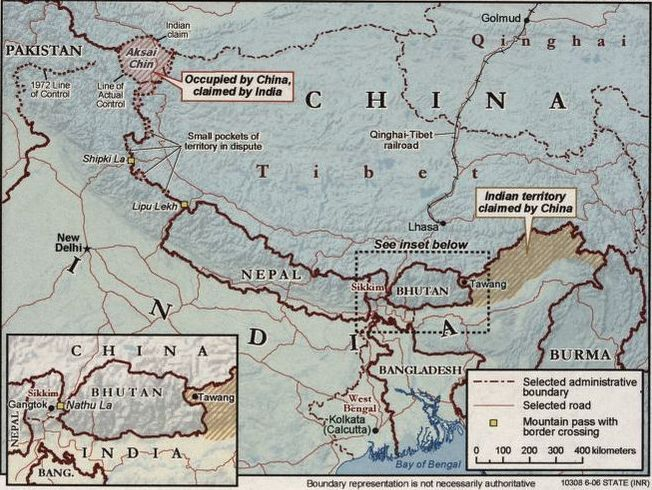
- Line of Actual Control between China and India (map by the CIA)
Date	20 October 1962 – present (64 years and 5 days)
Location	Line of Actual Control
Status	Ongoing

Belligerents
China	India

There is an ongoing territorial dispute between China and India over the sovereignty of two relatively large, and several smaller, separated pieces of territory at their border. The territorial disputes between the two countries stem from the legacy of British colonial-era border agreements, particularly the McMahon Line in the eastern sector, which was drawn in 1914 during the Simla Convention between British-ruled India and Tibet but was rejected by China. In the western sector, the dispute involves Aksai Chin, a region historically linked to the princely state of Jammu and Kashmir but effectively controlled by China after the 1962 war. The lack of mutually recognized boundary agreements has led to ongoing tensions and occasional military clashes.

The first of the territories, Aksai Chin, is administered by China and claimed by India; it is mostly uninhabited high-altitude wasteland but with some significant pasture lands at the margins. It lies at the intersection of Kashmir, Tibet and Xinjiang, and is crossed by China's Xinjiang-Tibet Highway. The second of the disputed territories, Arunachal Pradesh, is a region south of the McMahon Line. The area was formerly known as the North-East Frontier Agency, and is now administered by India as a state. The McMahon Line was signed between British India and Tibet to form part of the 1914 Simla Convention, but the latter was never ratified by China. China rejected the McMahon Line agreement, stating that Tibet was not independent when it signed the Simla Convention, and maintains a claim over the area.

The 1962 Sino-Indian War was fought in both disputed areas. Chinese troops attacked Indian border posts in Ladakh in the west and crossed the McMahon Line in the east. There was a brief border clash in 1967 in the region of Sikkim, despite there being an agreed border in that region. In 1987 and in 2013, potential conflicts over the Lines of Actual Control were successfully de-escalated. A conflict involving a Bhutanese-controlled area on the border between Bhutan and China was successfully de-escalated in 2017 following injuries to both Indian and Chinese troops. Multiple skirmishes broke out in 2020, escalating to dozens of deaths in June 2020.

Agreements signed pending the ultimate resolution of the boundary question were concluded in 1993 and 1996. This included "confidence-building measures" and the Line of Actual Control. To address the boundary question, formalised groups were created, such as the Joint Working Group (JWG) on the boundary question. It was to be assisted by the Diplomatic and Military Expert Group. In 2003, the Special Representatives (SRs) mechanism was constituted. In 2012 another dispute resolution mechanism, the Working Mechanism for Consultation and Coordination (WMCC), was framed.

== Background ==
The territorial disputes between the two countries result from the historical consequences of colonialism in Asia and the lack of clear historical boundary demarcations. There was one historical attempt to set a proposed boundary, the McMahon Line, by the United Kingdom during the 1913–1914 Simla Convention. The Republic of China rejected the proposed boundary. The unresolved dispute over the boundary became contentious after India gained its independence and the People's Republic of China was established. The disputed borders are complicated by the lack of administrative presence in the disputed areas, which are remote. Disagreements also result from the fact that the Line of Actual Control has never been distinctly demarcated, with China and India often disagreeing over its precise location.

=== Aksai Chin ===
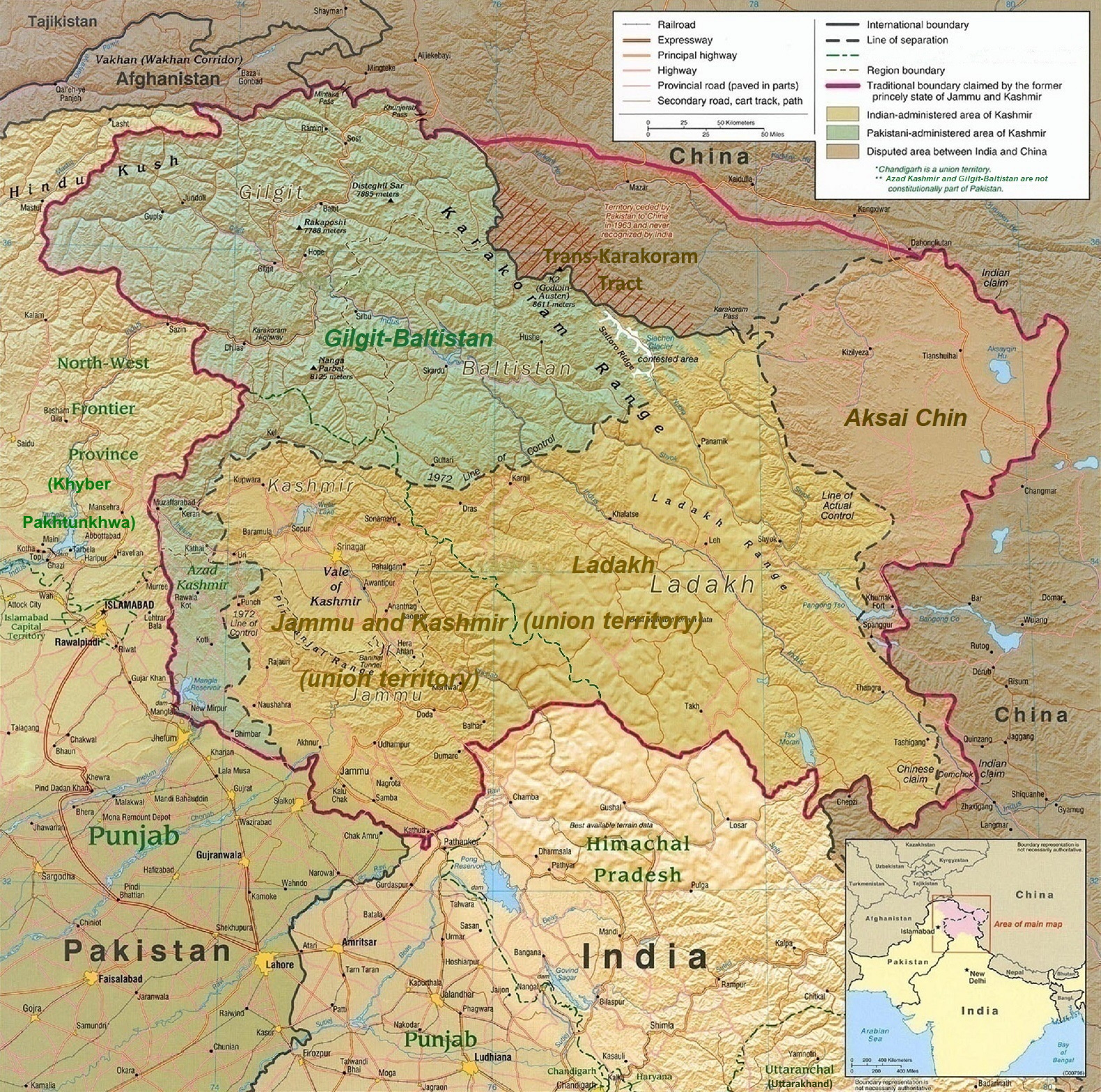
The western portion of the Line of Actual Control, separating the Eastern Ladakh and Aksai Chin. In the southern Demchok region, only two claim lines are shown (map by the CIA).

From the area's lowest point on the Karakash River at about 14,000 feet (4,300 m) to the glaciated peaks up to 22,500 feet (6,900 m) above sea level, Aksai Chin is a desolate, largely uninhabited area. It covers an area of about 37,244 square kilometres (14,380 sq mi). The desolation of this area meant that it had no significant human importance other than ancient trade routes crossing it, providing brief passage during summer for caravans of yaks from Xinjiang and Tibet.

One of the earliest treaties regarding the boundaries in the western sector was issued in 1842 following the Dogra–Tibetan War. The Sikh Empire of the Punjab region had annexed Ladakh into the state of Jammu in 1834. In 1841, they invaded Tibet with an army. Tibetan forces defeated the Sikh army and, in turn, entered Ladakh and besieged Leh. After being checked by the Sikh forces, the Tibetans and the Sikhs signed the Treaty of Chushul in September 1842, which stipulated no transgressions or interference in the other country's frontiers. The British defeat of the Sikhs in 1846 resulted in transfer of sovereignty over Ladakh to the British, and British commissioners attempted to meet with Chinese officials to discuss the border they now shared. However, both sides were sufficiently satisfied that a traditional border was recognised and defined by natural elements, and the border was not demarcated. The boundaries at the two extremities, Pangong Lake and Karakoram Pass, were reasonably well-defined, but the Aksai Chin area in between lay largely undefined.

==== The Johnson Line ====
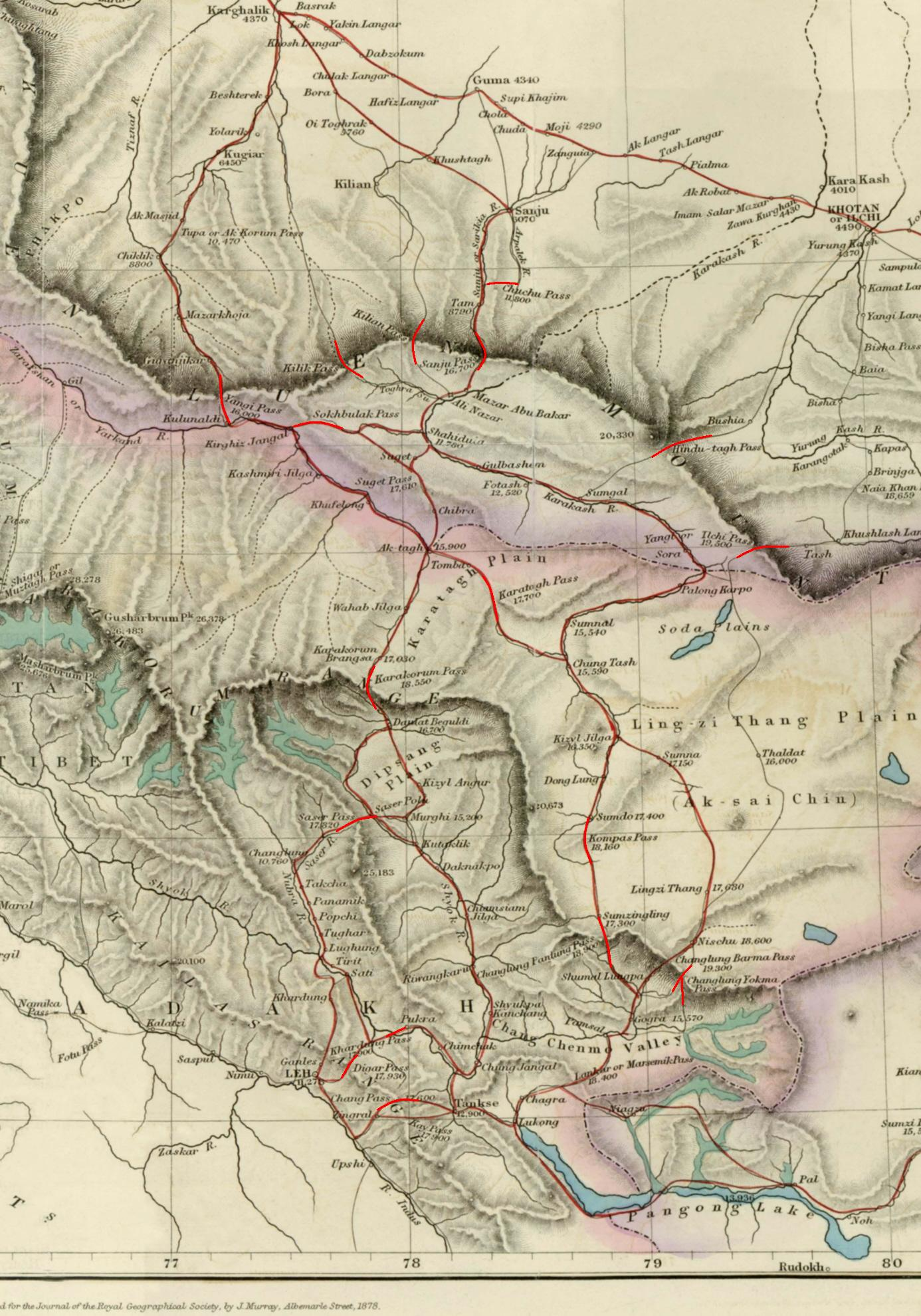
Map of Central Asia (1878) showing Khotan (near top right corner). The previous border claimed by the British Indian Empire is shown in the two-toned purple and pink band with Shahidulla and the Kilik, Kilian, and Sanju Passes clearly north of the border.

The map shows the Indian and Chinese claims of the border in the Aksai Chin region, the Macartney-MacDonald line, the Foreign Office Line, as well as the progress of Chinese forces as they occupied areas during the Sino-Indian War.

W. H. Johnson, a civil servant with the Survey of India, proposed the "Johnson Line" in 1865, which the British claimed Aksai Chin to be in Jammu and Kashmir. This was the time of the Uyghur occupation, when China did not control Xinjiang, so this line was never presented to the Chinese. Johnson presented this line to the Maharaja of Jammu and Kashmir, who then claimed the 18,000 square kilometres contained within his territory and by some accounts he claimed territory further north as far as the Sanju Pass in the Kun Lun Mountains. The Maharajah of Jammu and Kashmir constructed a fort at Shahidulla (modern-day Xaidulla), and had troops stationed there for some years to protect caravans. Eventually, most sources placed Shahidulla and the upper Karakash River firmly within the territory of Xinjiang (see accompanying map). According to Francis Younghusband, who explored the region in the late 1880s, there was only an abandoned fort and not one inhabited house at Shahidulla when he was there – it was just a convenient staging post and a convenient headquarters for the nomadic Kirghiz. The abandoned fort had apparently been built a few years earlier by the Dogras. In 1878, the Chinese had reconquered Xinjiang, and by 1890, they already had Shahidulla before the issue was decided. By 1892, China had erected boundary markers at Karakoram Pass.

In 1897, a British Raj military officer, Sir John Ardagh, proposed a boundary line along the crest of the Kun Lun Mountains north of the Yarkand River. At the time, Britain was concerned at the danger of Russian expansion as China weakened, and Ardagh argued that his line was more defensible. The Ardagh line was effectively a modification of the Johnson line and became known as the "Johnson-Ardagh Line".

==== The Macartney-Macdonald Line ====
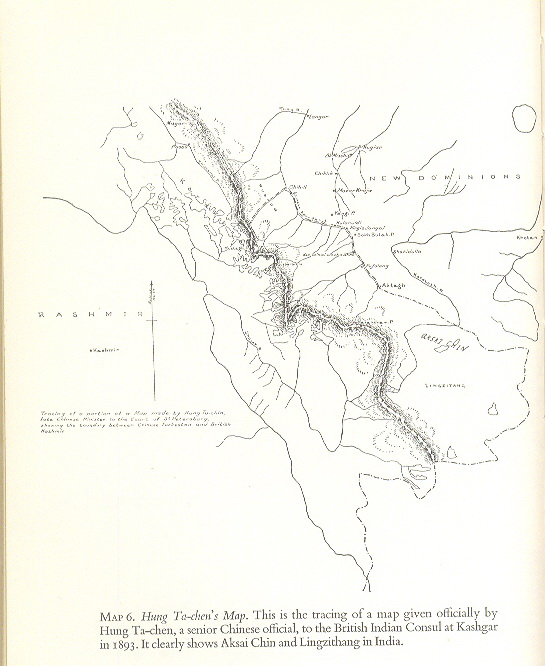
The map given by Hung Ta-chen to the British consul at Kashgar in 1893. The boundary, marked with a thin dot-dashed line, matches the Johnson line

In 1893, Hung Ta-chen, a senior Chinese official at St. Petersburg, gave maps of the region to George Macartney, the British consul general at Kashgar, which coincided in broad details. In 1899, Britain proposed a revised boundary, initially suggested by Macartney and developed by the Governor General of India Lord Elgin. This boundary placed the Lingzi Tang plains, which are south of the Laktsang range, in India, and Aksai Chin proper, which is north of the Laktsang range, in China. This border, along the Karakoram Mountainss, was proposed and supported by British officials for several reasons. The Karakoram Mountains formed a natural boundary, which would set the British borders up to the Indus River watershed while leaving the Tarim River watershed in Chinese control, and Chinese control of this tract would present a further obstacle to Russian advance in Central Asia. The British presented this line, known as the Macartney-MacDonald Line, to the Chinese in 1899 in a note by Sir Claude MacDonald. The Qing government did not respond to the note. According to some commentators, China believed that this had been the accepted boundary.

==== 1899 to 1947 ====
Both the Johnson-Ardagh and the Macartney-MacDonald lines were used on British maps of India. Until at least 1908, the British took the Macdonald line to be the boundary, but in 1911, after the collapse of central power in China, and by the end of World War I, the British officially used the Johnson Line. However, they took no steps to establish outposts or assert actual control on the ground. In 1927, the line was adjusted again as the government of British India abandoned the Johnson line in favour of a line along the Karakoram range further south. However, the maps were not updated and still showed the Johnson Line.

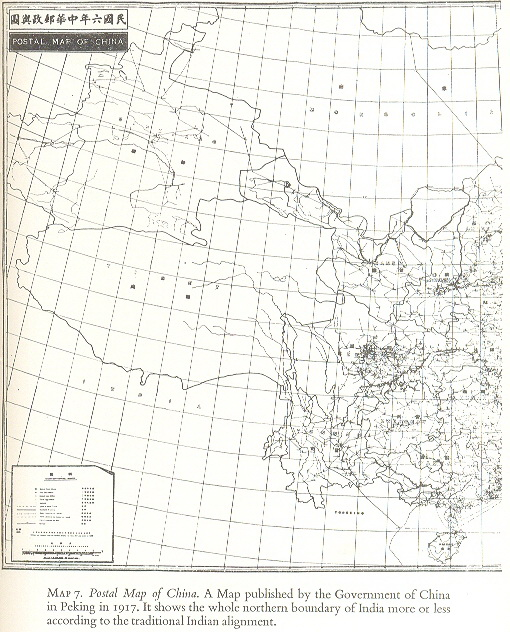
Postal map of China published by the Government of China in 1917. The boundary in Aksai Chin is as per the Johnson line.

From 1917 to 1933, the Postal Atlas of China, published by the Government of China in Peking, had shown the boundary in Aksai Chin as per the Johnson line, which runs along the Kunlun Mountains. The Peking University Atlas, published in 1925, also put the Aksai Chin in India. When British officials learned of Soviet officials surveying the Aksai Chin for Sheng Shicai, warlord of Xinjiang in 1940–1941, they again advocated the Johnson Line. At this point, the British had still made no attempts to establish outposts or control over the Aksai Chin, nor was the issue ever discussed with the governments of China or Tibet, and the boundary remained undemarcated at India's independence.

==== Since 1947 ====
Upon independence in 1947, the government of India fixed its official boundary in the west, which included the Aksai Chin, in a manner that resembled the Ardagh–Johnson Line. India's basis for defining the border was "chiefly by long usage and custom". Unlike the Johnson line, India did not claim the northern areas near Shahidulla and Khotan. From the Karakoram Pass (which is not under dispute), the Indian claim line extends northeast of the Karakoram Mountains north of the salt flats of the Aksai Chin, to set a boundary at the Kunlun Mountains, and incorporates part of the Karakash River and Yarkand River watersheds. From there, it runs east along the Kunlun Mountains, before turning southwest through the Aksai Chin salt flats, through the Karakoram Mountains, and then to Pangong Lake.

On 1 July 1954, Prime Minister Nehru wrote a memo directing that the maps of India be revised to show definite boundaries on all frontiers. Up to this point, the boundary in the Aksai Chin sector, based on the Johnson Line, had been described as "undemarcated".

=== Trans-Karakoram Tract ===
The Johnson Line is not used west of the Karakoram Pass, where China adjoins Pakistan-administered Gilgit–Baltistan. On 13 October 1962, China and Pakistan began negotiations over the boundary west of the Karakoram Pass. In 1963, the two countries settled their boundaries largely based on the Macartney–MacDonald Line, which left the Trans Karakoram Tract approximately 5,180 km^{2} (2,000 sq mi) to 5,300 km^{2} (2,000 sq mi) in China, although the agreement provided for renegotiation in the event of a settlement of the Kashmir conflict. India does not recognise that Pakistan and China have a common border, and claims the tract as part of the domains of the pre-1947 state of Kashmir and Jammu. However, India's claim line in that area does not extend as far north of the Karakoram Mountains as the Johnson Line. China and India still have disputes over these borders.

=== The McMahon Line ===
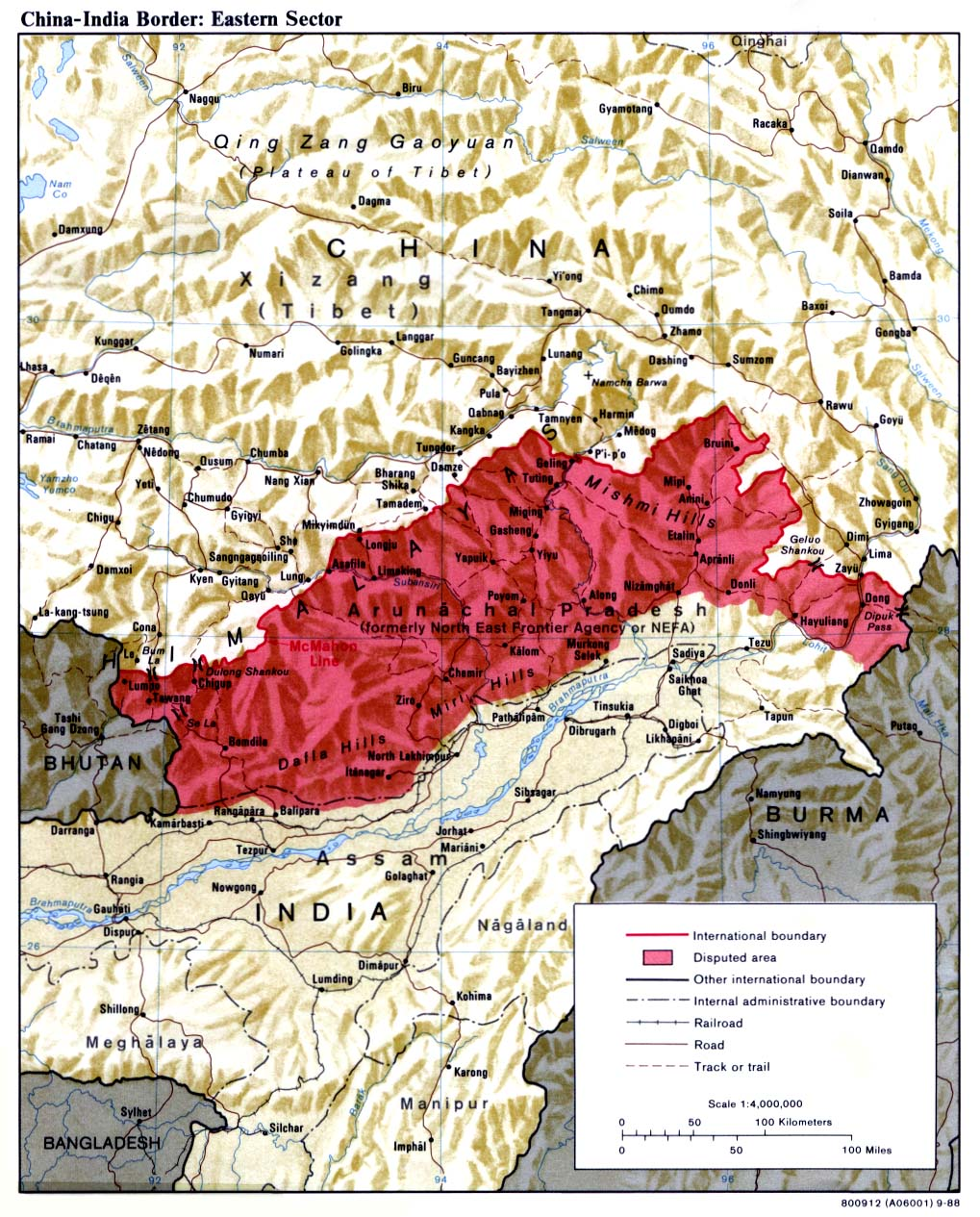
The McMahon Line is the northern border of the red tinted disputed area.

British India annexed Assam in northeastern India in 1826 by the Treaty of Yandabo at the conclusion of the First Anglo-Burmese War (1824–1826). After the subsequent Anglo-Burmese Wars, the whole of Burma was annexed, giving the British a border with China's Yunnan province. In 1913–14, representatives of the United Kingdom, China, and Tibet attended a conference in Simla, India, and drew up an agreement concerning Tibet's status and borders. The McMahon Line, a proposed boundary between Tibet and India for the eastern sector, was drawn by British negotiator Henry McMahon on a map attached to the agreement. All three representatives initialled the agreement, but Beijing soon objected to the proposed Sino-Tibet boundary and repudiated the agreement, refusing to sign the final, more detailed map. After approving a note which stated that China could not enjoy rights under the agreement unless it ratified it, the British and Tibetan negotiators signed the Simla Convention and a more detailed map as a bilateral accord. Neville Maxwell states that McMahon had been instructed not to sign bilaterally with Tibetans if China refused, but he did so without the Chinese representative present and then kept the declaration secret.

V. K. Singh argues that the basis of these boundaries, accepted by the British Raj and Tibet, was that the historical boundaries of India were the Himalayas and the areas south of the Himalayas were traditionally Indian and associated with India. The high watershed of the Himalayas was proposed as the border between India and its northern neighbours. India's government held the view that the Himalayas were the ancient boundaries of the Indian subcontinent and thus should be the modern boundaries of British India and later the Republic of India. Chinese boundary markers, including one set up by the newly created Chinese Republic, stood near Walong until January 1914, when T. O'Callaghan, an assistant administrator of North East Frontier Agency (NEFA)'s eastern sector, relocated them north to locations closer to the McMahon Line (albeit still South of the Line). He then went to Rima, met with Tibetan officials, and saw no Chinese influence in the area.

By signing the Simla Convention with Tibet, the British had violated the Anglo-Russian Convention of 1907, in which both parties were not to negotiate with Tibet, "except through the intermediary of the Chinese Government", as well as the Anglo-Chinese Convention of 1906, which bound the British government "not to annex Tibetan territory". Because of doubts concerning the legal status of the accord, the British did not put the McMahon Line on their maps until 1937, nor did they publish the Simla Convention in the treaty record until 1938. Rejecting Tibet's 1913 declaration of independence, China argued that the Simla Convention and McMahon Line were illegal and that the Tibetan government was merely a local government without treaty-making powers.

The British records show that the Tibetan government's acceptance of the new border in 1914 was conditional on China accepting the Simla Convention. Since the British were not able to get acceptance from China, Tibetans considered the McMahon Line invalid. Tibetan officials continued to administer Tawang and refused to concede territory during negotiations in 1938. The governor of Assam asserted that Tawang was "undoubtedly British" but noted that it was "controlled by Tibet, and none of its inhabitants have any idea that they are not Tibetan". During World War II, with India's east threatened by Japanese troops and with the threat of Chinese expansionism, British troops secured Tawang for extra defence.

China's claim on areas south of the McMahon Line, encompassed in the NEFA, was based on the traditional boundaries. India believes that the boundaries China proposed in Ladakh and Arunachal Pradesh have no written basis and no documentation of acceptance by anyone apart from China. The Indian government has argued that China claims the territory on the basis that it was under Chinese imperial control in the past, while the Chinese government argues that India claims the territory on the basis that it was under British imperial control in the past. However, the practice that India does not place a claim to the regions which previously had the presence of the Mauryan Empire and Chola Dynasty, but which were heavily influenced by Indian culture, further complicates the issue.

India's claim line in the eastern sector follows its interpretation of the McMahon Line. The line drawn by McMahon on the detailed 24–25 March 1914 Simla Treaty maps clearly starts at 27°45'40"N, a trijunction between Bhutan, China, and India, and from there, extends eastwards. Most of the fighting in the eastern sector before the start of the war would take place immediately north of this line. However, India claimed that the intent of the treaty was to follow the main watershed ridge divide of the Himalayas based on memos from McMahon and the fact that over 90% of the McMahon Line does in fact follow the main watershed ridge divide of the Himalayas. They claimed that territory south of the high ridges here near Bhutan (as elsewhere along most of the McMahon Line) should be Indian territory and north of the high ridges should be Chinese territory. In the Indian claim, the two armies would be separated from each other by the highest mountains in the world.

During and after the 1950s, when India began patrolling this area and mapping in greater detail, they confirmed what the 1914 Simla agreement map depicted: six river crossings that interrupted the main Himalayan watershed ridge. At the westernmost location near Bhutan, north of Tawang, they modified their maps to extend their claim line northwards to include features such as Thag La ridge, Longju, and Khinzemane as Indian territory. Thus, the Indian version of the McMahon Line moves the Bhutan-China-India trijunction north to 27°51'30"N from 27°45'40"N. India would claim that the treaty map ran along features such as Thag La ridge, though the actual treaty map itself is topographically vague (as the treaty was not accompanied with demarcation) in places, shows a straight line (not a watershed ridge) near Bhutan and near Thag La, and the treaty includes no verbal description of geographic features nor description of the highest ridges.

=== Sikkim ===
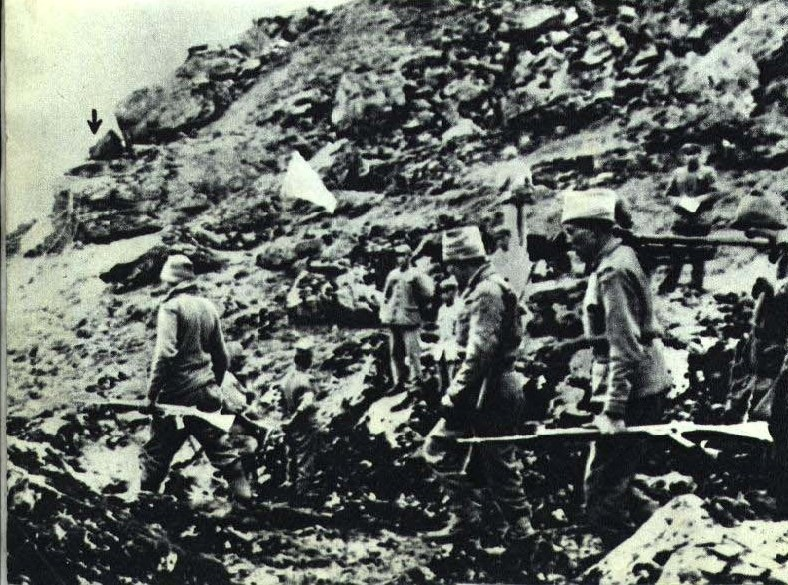
India receives the body of a soldier after the Sino-Indian border conflict, 1967

The Nathu La and Cho La clashes were a series of military clashes in 1967 between India and China along the border of the Himalayan Kingdom of Sikkim, then an Indian protectorate. The end of the conflicts saw a Chinese military withdrawal from Sikkim.

In 1975, the Sikkimese monarchy held a referendum, in which the Sikkimese voted overwhelmingly in favour of joining India. At the time China protested and rejected it as illegal. The Sino-Indian Memorandum of 2003 was hailed as a de facto Chinese acceptance of the annexation. China published a map showing Sikkim as a part of India and the Foreign Ministry deleted it from the list of China's "border countries and regions". However, the Sikkim-China border's northernmost point, "The Finger", continues to be the subject of dispute and military activity.

Chinese Prime Minister Wen Jiabao said in 2005 that "Sikkim is no longer the problem between China and India."

== Boundary disputes ==
=== 1947–1962 ===
During the 1950s, the People's Republic of China built a 1,200 kilometres (750 mi) road connecting Xinjiang and western Tibet, of which 179 kilometres (111 mi) ran south of the Johnson Line through the Aksai Chin region claimed by India. Aksai Chin was easily accessible from China, but for the Indians on the south side of the Karakoram, the mountain range proved to be a complication in their access to Aksai Chin. The Indians did not learn of the existence of the road until 1957, which was confirmed when the road was shown in Chinese maps published in 1958.

The Indian position, as argued by Prime Minister Jawaharlal Nehru, was that the Aksai Chin was "part of the Ladakh region of India for centuries", in spite of the fact that Ladakh has been a traditional Tibetan kingdom. The Chinese premier Zhou Enlai argued that the western border had never been delimited, that the Macartney-MacDonald Line, which left part of Aksai Chin within Chinese borders, was the only line ever proposed to a Chinese government. He also claimed that Aksai Chin was already under Chinese jurisdiction, and that negotiations should take into account the status quo.

In 1960, Nehru and Zhou Enlai agreed to hold discussions between officials from India and China for examining the historical, political, and administrative basis of the boundary dispute. The two sides disagreed on the major watershed that defined the boundary in the western sector.

=== 1962 Sino-Indian War on the Borderline ===
The 1962 Sino-Indian War was a boundary conflict in which boundary disputes formally resulted in a war. Based on the claims of the McMahon Line, India had escalated more and more in the 1960s, building in 1961 over 43 military strongholds on the Chinese side of the McMahon Line. Despite several Chinese attempts at negotiations, Indians refused to negotiate, leading to tensions growing on the line of actual control. An editorial was published on 22 September named "If this can be tolerated, what cannot be tolerated?" by the Chinese government in the Chinese newspaper People's Daily as a warning against Indian provocation.

On 20 October 1962, the People's Liberation Army retaliated by initiating a counterattack against Indian forces. The battle was overwhelmingly favourable for the PLA as Indian forces failed to create effective defences. On 16 November 1962, four Chinese soldiers led by Guoxing Pang, unsupported and detached from other Chinese forces, defeated a whole Indian artillery regiment unscathed and seized seven pieces of artillery.

The Indian defeat forced Nehru to ask Kennedy for military aid. The two poles of the Cold War were then in great tension due to Cuban Missile Crisis until November 1962. Surprisingly, China declared a unilateral ceasefire on 21 November 1962 despite a military advantage and having expelled the Indian army from some disputed areas. Many consider the Chinese retreat to be an attempt to avoid USA or Soviet intervention (and to worsen the Chinese diplomatic position) as the Cuban Missile Crisis had just been resolved. After this conflict, the line of actual control remained unchanged.

=== 1967 Nathu La and Cho La clashes ===
The Nathu La and Cho La clashes were a series of military clashes in 1967, between India and China alongside the border of the Himalayan Kingdom of Sikkim, then an Indian protectorate.

The Nathu La clashes started on 11 September 1967, when the People's Liberation Army (PLA) launched an attack on Indian posts at Nathu La, and lasted till 15 September 1967. In October 1967, another military duel took place at Cho La and ended on the same day. According to independent sources, the Indian forces achieved "decisive tactical advantage" and defeated the Chinese forces in these clashes. Many PLA fortifications at Nathu La were said to be destroyed, where the Indian troops drove back the attacking Chinese forces.

=== 1987 Sino Indian skirmish ===
The 1987 Sino-Indian skirmish was the third military conflict between the Chinese People's Liberation Army Ground Force and the Indian Army that occurred at the Sumdorong Chu Valley, with the previous one taking place 20 years earlier.

=== 1968–2017 ===
SINO-INDIAN BORDER DEFENSES CHUSHUL AREA (CIA, 1963)

On 20 October 1975, 4 Indian soldiers were killed at Tulung La in Arunachal Pradesh. According to the official statement by the Indian government, a patrol of the Assam Rifles comprising a non-commissioned officer (NCO) and four other soldiers was ambushed by about 40 Chinese soldiers while in an area well within Indian territory, and which had been regularly patrolled for years without incident. Four members of the patrol unit were initially listed as missing before confirmation via diplomatic channels that they had been killed by the Chinese troops; their bodies were later returned. The Indian government registered a strong protest with the Chinese.

In 2006, the Chinese ambassador to India claimed that all of Arunachal Pradesh is Chinese territory amidst a military buildup. At the time, both countries claimed incursions as much as a kilometre at the northern tip of Sikkim. In 2009, India announced it would deploy additional military forces along the border. In 2014, India proposed that China acknowledge a "One India" policy to resolve the border dispute.

The reactions of Indian officials to these successive incursions have also been to a pattern:

- Suppress information
- Deny

Who is misled when information is suppressed? […] Not the Chinese— […] Not other countries, be they the US or Vietnam [….] The people who are lulled are the people of India. And the object of lulling them is straightforward—not just that they should not come to think that their government has been negligent, but that they should not pressurize the government into doing anything more than what it is doing.

— Arun Shourie, Self-Deception: India's China Policies, 2013

In April 2013 India claimed, referencing their own perception of the Line of Actual Control (LAC) location, that Chinese troops had established a camp in the Daulat Beg Oldi sector, 10 km (6.2 mi) on their side of the Line of Actual Control. This figure was later revised to a 19 km (12 mi) claim. According to Indian media, the incursion included Chinese military helicopters entering Indian airspace to drop supplies to the troops. However, Chinese officials denied any trespass having taken place. Soldiers from both countries briefly set up camps on the ill-defined frontier facing each other, but the tension was defused when both sides pulled back soldiers in early May. In September 2014, India and China had a standoff at the LAC, when Indian workers began constructing a canal in the border village of Demchok, Ladakh, and Chinese civilians protested with the army's support. It ended after about three weeks, when both sides agreed to withdraw troops. The Indian army claimed that the Chinese military had set up a camp 3 km (1.9 mi) inside territory claimed by India.

In September 2015, Chinese and Indian troops faced off in the Burtse region of northern Ladakh after Indian troops dismantled a disputed watchtower the Chinese were building close to the mutually agreed patrolling line.

=== 2017 Doklam military standoff ===
Chart definition page not found.

View source data.
Major sites of Chinese transgressions on the LAC (2015–2019) per official Indian Army and Indo-Tibetan Border Police data

In June, a military standoff occurred between India and China in the disputed territory of Doklam, near the Doka La pass. On 16 June 2017, the Chinese brought heavy road-building equipment to the Doklam region and began constructing a road in the disputed area. Previously, China had built a dirt road terminating at Doka La, where Indian troops were stationed. They would conduct foot patrol from this point up till the Royal Bhutanese Army (RBA) post at Jampheri Ridge. The dispute that ensued post 16 June stemmed from the fact that the Chinese had begun building a road below Doka La, in what India and Bhutan claim to be disputed territory. This resulted in Indian intervention in China's road construction on 18 June, two days after construction began. Bhutan claims that the Chinese have violated the written agreements between the two countries that were drawn up in 1988 and 1998 after extensive rounds of talks. The agreements drawn state that the status quo must be maintained in the Doklam area as of before March 1959. It is these agreements that China has violated by constructing a road below Doka La. A series of statements from each country's respective External Affairs ministries were issued defending each country's actions. Due to the ambiguity of earlier rounds of border talks beginning from the 1890 Anglo-Chinese Convention that was signed in Kolkata on 17 March 1890, each country refers to different agreements drawn when trying to defend its position on the border dispute.Following the incursion, on 28 June, the Chinese military claimed that India had blocked the construction of a road that was taking place in China's sovereign territory. On 30 June, India's Foreign Ministry claimed that China's road construction in violation of the status quo had security implications for India. Following this, on 5 July, Bhutan issued a demarche asking China to restore the status quo as of before 16 June. Throughout July and August, the Doklam issue remained unresolved. On 28 August, India issued a statement saying that both countries have agreed to "expeditious disengagement" in the Doklam region.

In 2019, India and China decided to coordinate border patrolling at one disputed point along the LAC.

=== 2020–2022 skirmishes ===
In June 2020, Indian and Chinese troops engaged in a brawl in the Galwan River valley, which reportedly led to the deaths of 20 Indian soldiers. Indian media claimed 40+ Chinese soldiers had been killed, but this number was not confirmed by Chinese authorities. China has since enhanced its position in the border area through salami-slicing tactics.

== Timeline ==
Indian PM: Nehru
Indira Gandhi
I. Gandhi
R. Gandhi
Narasimha Rao
Vajpayee
Manmohan Singh
Narendra Modi
Leader CCP: Mao Zedong
Hua Guofeng
Hu Yaobang
Zhao Ziyang
Jiang Zemin
Hu Jintao
Xi Jinping
8 rounds border talks
15 rounds JWG talks
22 rounds SR talks
20 rounds WMCC talks
│
1955
│
1960
│
1965
│
1970
│
1975
│
1980
│
1985
│
1990
│
1995
│
2000
│
2005
│
2010
│
2015
│
2020
India–China border relations since 1962, including major border incidents and border diplomacy.

== Boundary discussions ==
One of the first sets of formal talks between China and India on the border was following Zhou Enlai's visit to India from 19 to 25 April 1960. Following this, there were a further three sessions of talks, the "Official's" talks, between 15 June-6 July 1960; 15 August-24 September 1960; and 7 November-12 December 1960. These discussions produced the 'Report of the Officials on the boundary question'.

Boundary discussions have covered micro and macro issues of the dispute. At a local level, localised disputes and related events such as de-engagement and de-escalation are tackled. Wider overarching issues include discussion related to a package settlement versus sector-wise, clarification of the LAC and border and accordingly the exchange of maps, and delinking or linking the boundary dispute to other bilateral ties.

=== Package proposal ===
China made the so-called "package" offer in 1960, which again came to the table in 1980–85. As explained by former foreign secretary Shyam Saran, China "would be prepared to accept an alignment in the Eastern Sector, in general conforming to the McMahon Line, but India would have to concede Aksai Chin to China in the Western Sector [...] For the Central Sector, the differences were regarded as relatively minor and manageable." In other words, China "offered to hold 26% of the disputed land". In 1985, China made modifications to the package— "the Indian side would have to make significant and meaningful concessions in the Eastern Sector... for which China would make corresponding but undefined concessions in the Western Sector". Additionally, Tawang was brought up "as indispensable to any boundary settlement". These changes in the package proposal by China remained till at least 2015.

=== Linking border and other bilateral relations ===
During the first round of renewed talks between China and India in December 1981, China suggested maintaining the status quo on the border question, and in the meantime other relations could be normalized. By the fourth round in October 1983 the Indian negotiators agreed to normalization in other areas. This aspect of linking or de-linking border relations resurfaced in the 2020–2021 China–India skirmishes.

=== Legal positions ===
In the 1980s, during the beginning of talks between the two countries, India made it clear that it would not discuss the legal position of either side as it had already been documented in the 1960 Official's report.

=== Political initiatives ===
During the eighth round of talks in November 1987, in the background of the Sumdorong Chu standoff, the negotiators on both sides concluded that apart from these bureaucratic-level talks, a political move was needed.

== Dispute management and resolution mechanism ==
Indian spokesperson for the Ministry of External Affairs stated in May 2020 that there were enough bilateral mechanisms to solve border disputes diplomatically. However, some critics say that these agreements are "deeply flawed".

=== Bilateral mechanisms ===
Bodies/mechanisms have been formed as per bilateral agreements to consult on the boundary question:

Dispute resolution mechanism name	Abbr.	Date proposed	Formed on/via		First round	Last round	Total rounds	Status
Dispute resolution mechanism name	Abbr.	Date proposed	Date	Statement/Agreement	First round	Last round	Total rounds	Status
India-China Joint Working Group on the boundary question	JWG	–	1988	Joint Press Communique	30 June-4 July 1989	–	–	–
India-China Diplomatic and Military Expert Group	EG	–	7 September 1993	Border Peace and Tranquility Agreement	2–4 February 1994	–	–	–
Special Representatives mechanism on the boundary question	SR/SRM	1979	23 June 2003	Declaration on Principles for Relations and Comprehensive Cooperation	26 October 2003	21 December 2019	22	Functional
Working Mechanism for Consultation and Coordination on India-China Border Affairs	WMCC	2010	17 January 2012	Agreement on the Establishment of a Working Mechanism for Consultation and Coordination	6 March 2012	18 December 2020	20	Functional
Other: Border Personnel Meeting points, Hotlines (6 hotlines as of July 2021), normal diplomatic channels

Following the 1962 boundary war, official border talks started in December 1981. There were eight rounds of these talks, with the eighth round being in 1987. In 1988, through a joint press communique, the border talks were formalized as the 'India-China Joint Working Group on the Boundary Question' (JWG). The JWG met 15 times, the final meeting being in 2005. In 2003, the Special Representatives Mechanism (SRM) was set up as per the 'Declaration on Principles for Relations and Comprehensive Cooperation'.

In April 2005, another agreement mentioned that the JWG, the "India-China Diplomatic and Military Expert Group", and the "Special Representatives on the boundary question" would carry on with their work and consultations. Other than agreements directly related to the border, there have been numerous agreements that worked on other aspects of the bilateral relations such as a memorandum of understanding on military relations that was signed in 2006, that in turn affected the border situation.

=== Bilateral agreements ===
- India-China border-related agreements
  - 1988: India-China Joint Working Group on the boundary question
  - Trade
    - 1991: Memorandum on the Resumption of Border Trade
    - 1992: Protocol on Entry and Exit Procedures for Border Trade
    - 2003: Memorandum on Expanding Border Trade
  - Confidence-building measures
    - 1993: Border Peace and Tranquility Agreement, 1993
    - 1996: Agreement on Military Confidence Building Measures
    - 2005: Protocol for the Implementation of Military Confidence Building Measures
  - Political measures
    - 2003: Declaration on Principles for Relations and Comprehensive Cooperation
    - 2005: Agreement on the Political Parameters and Guiding Principles for the Settlement of the India-China Boundary Question
  - 2012: Agreement on the Establishment of a Working Mechanism for Consultation and Coordination on India-China Border Affairs
  - 2013: Border Defence Cooperation Agreement
  - 2020: 5-point statement

=== Bilateral military communication channels ===
==== Border meeting points ====
Border Personnel Meeting points
(existing in red, proposed/discussed in blue)

There are five Border Personnel Meeting points (BPM) for holding rounds of dispute resolution talks among the military personnel with a defined escalation path, such as first between colonels, then between brigadiers, and finally between major generals. Of these five BPM, two are in the Indian Union Territory of Ladakh or India's western (northern) sector corresponding to China's Southern Xinxiang Military District, one in Sikkim and two in Arunachal Pradesh in India's central and eastern sectors corresponding to China's Tibet Military District.

==== Hotlines ====
Negotiations for an inter-military hotline started in 2012. It was initially planned for communication between India's Eastern Command and the PLA's Chengdu Military Region Command. Negotiations for the Director General of Military Operations (DGMO) level hotline continued in 2013. In 2014, a hotline was set up between the DGMOs of both countries. In 2021, both countries agreed to set up a hotline between their foreign ministers. By 31 July 2021, six hotlines had been set up between commanders; 2 in Ladakh, 2 in Sikkim and 2 in Arunachal Pradesh.

==== Corps Commander Level Meetings ====
'Corps Commander Level Meetings' during the 2020–2021 China–India skirmishes allowed both sides to exchange perspectives and was seen as an important way to keep communication open. The length of these meetings varied from 9 hours to over 12 hours. Apart from the military, the chief of the Indo-Tibetan Border Police and a Ministry of External Affairs representative were also present.

In October 2024, India announced that it had reached an agreement over patrolling arrangements along the Line of Actual Control (LAC) in the border area, which would lead to disengagement and resolution of the long-running conflict that began in 2020.

India and China started implementing an agreement to end a military standoff along their disputed Himalayan border. This marks a significant diplomatic development between the two countries since deadly clashes occurred between their armies four years ago. Both sides have agreed on phased disengagement steps aimed at reducing tensions along the Line of Actual Control (LAC), where troops have been deployed in proximity.

== Geostrategic military aspects ==
=== Commands and troops deployment ===
Western Theater Command of China, area under integrated command.

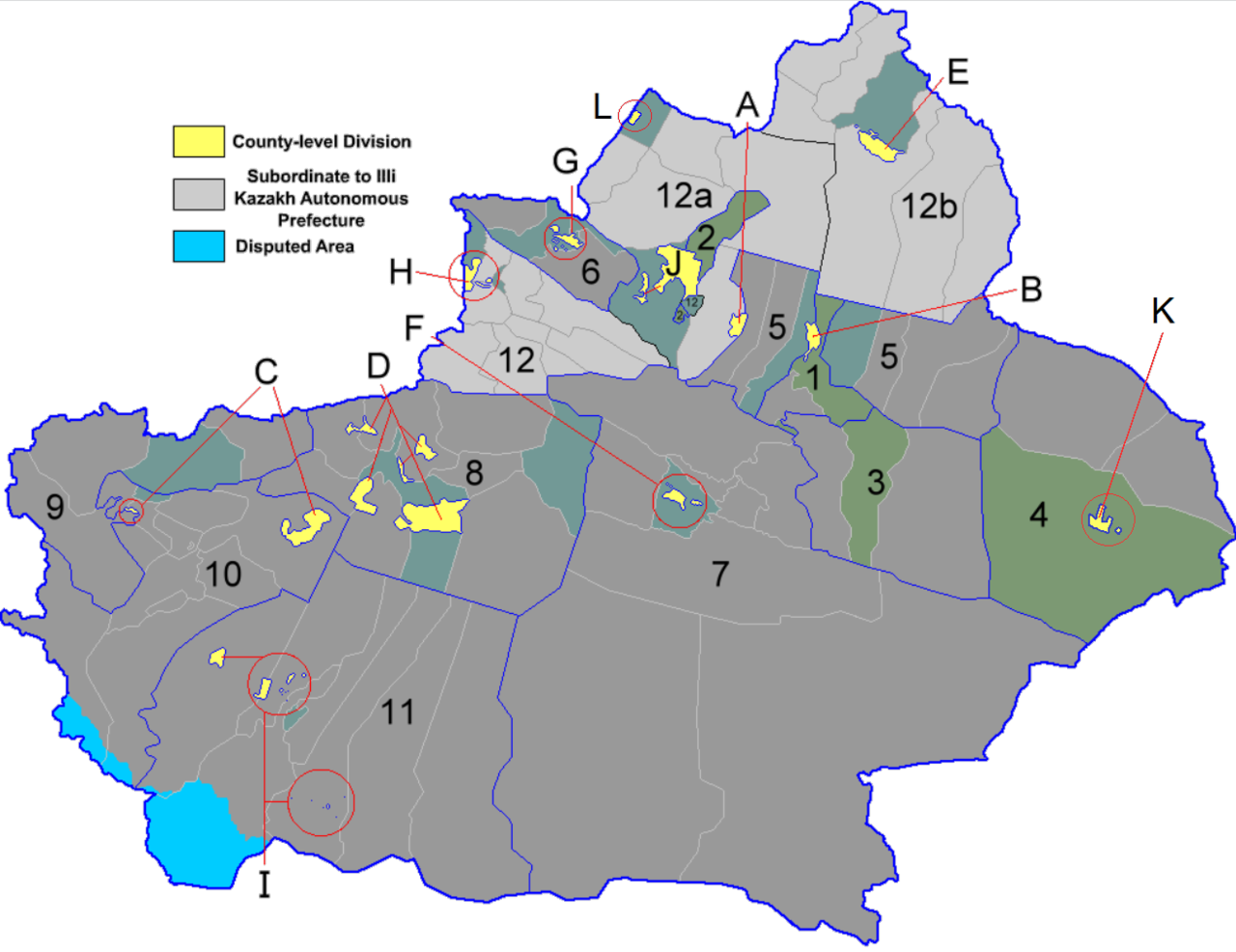
Map of Xinjiang Uyghur Autonomous Region with disputed areas claimed by China shown in blue.

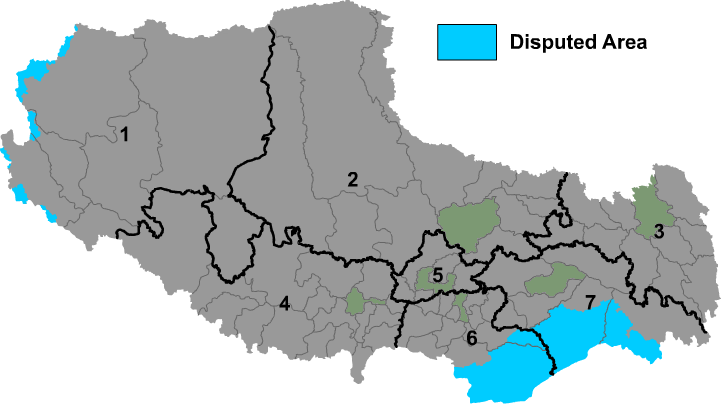
Map of Tibet Autonomous Region with disputed areas claimed by China shown in blue.

Chinese Military has an integrated Western Theater Command (WTC) across the whole LAC with India. Western Theater Command also covers the provinces of Sichuan, Gansu, Ningxia, Qinghai, and Chongqing. China has 5 integrated theater commands.

Indian Military has divided the LAC into 3 sectors – the northern sector (some times also called western sector) across Ladakh and the Chinese-held Aksai Chin, the central sector across Himachal Pradesh and Uttrakhand states, and the eastern sector across Sikkim and Arunachal Pradesh states. Similarly, Indian Airforce has Prayagraj-based Western Air Command, Delhi-based Central Air Command, and Shillong-based Eastern Air Command to cover the LAC. India, whose sole integrated command is Andaman and Nicobar Command, is still going through integration of its various geography and services based commands as of 2020.

The Belfer Center for Science and International Affairs (BCSIA) carried out an independent analysis of troop deployment in 2020. Indian Army strike forces have 225,000 soldiers near its border, all of whom are focused on China. Numbers include 34,000 in the Northern Command, 15,500 in the Central Command, and 175,500 troops in the Eastern Command, including 3,000 soldiers of the T-72 tank brigade in Ladakh and 1,000 soldiers of the BrahMos cruise missile regiment in Arunachal Pradesh. Of the 200,000 to 230,000 ground forces under China's Western Theater Command, only 110,000 are stationed on its border, while the rest are deployed on China's border with Russia in the North, inside Tibet and Xinjiang, or deployed elsewhere inside Western China. Of the Chinese troops stationed on the India border, mainly belonging to the 76th Group Army and 77th Group Army, 70,000 are deployed in Southern Xinjiang Military District (corresponding to India's northern or western sector in Ladakh), and 40,000 are deployed in Tibet Military District (corresponding to India's central and eastern sector along with the rest of the LAC from Himachal Pradesh to Arunachal Pradesh). The remaining forces would not be available for deployment to the India border in the case of a wider conflict. This creates a disparity in terms of India's larger number of conventional troops (225,000) focused on the China border, compared to the smaller number of Chinese troops (90,000–120,000) focused on the Indian border, the majority of whom are deployed far from the Indian border, while Indian troops are deployed closer. In the case of conflict, while Indian troops are already in position on or near the border, China will have to mobilise troops mainly from Xinjiang and from other Western Theater Command troops inside China's interior.

Command deployment is as follows:

India		China
Indian Army Sector / Commands	Indian Air Force	China
Northern (also called "Western") (Ladakh)	Western Air Command (Delhi)	Western Theater Command (Xinjiang and Tibet)
Central (Himachal Pradesh and Uttrakhand)	Central Air Command (Prayagraj)	Western Theater Command (Xinjiang and Tibet)
Eastern (Sikkim and Arunachal Pradesh)	Eastern Air Command (Shillong)	Western Theater Command (Xinjiang and Tibet)

=== Village construction ===
In 2024, The New York Times reported that, according to satellite imagery, China had constructed villages along and inside of disputed territory within Arunachal Pradesh (territory which falls within India based on the McMahon Line, but is administered by China, due to it falling on the Chinese side of the Line of Actual Control). Chinese individuals, called "border guardians," received annual subsidies to relocate to newly built villages and paid to conduct border patrols.

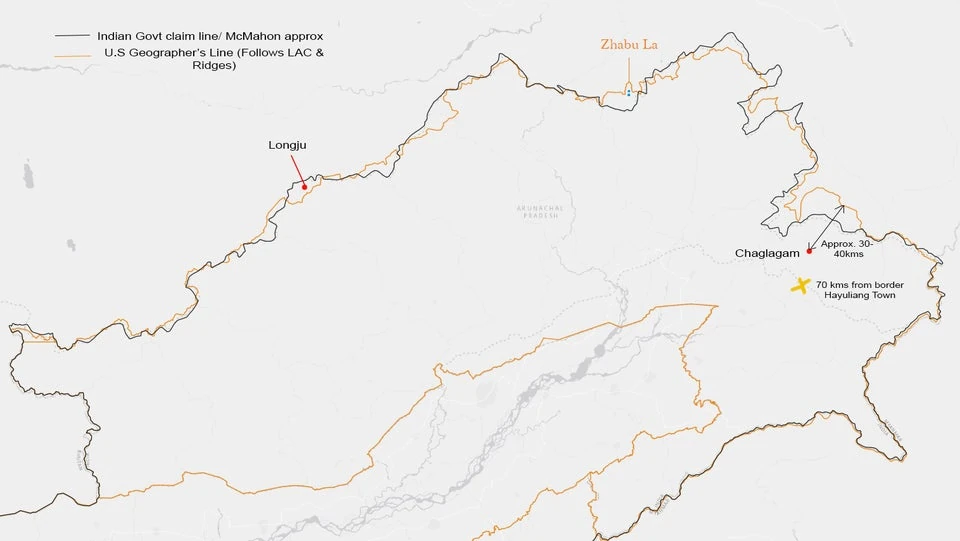
The Line of Actual Control vs the legally claimed McMahon Line in Arunachal Pradesh.

== List of disputed areas ==
List of disputed areas, each with several hundred to several thousand km^{2} area, is as follows:

Red dots represent sensitive and disputed locations on the line of actual control (LAC) such as Depsang, area of Kongka Pass, north of Kugrang River, north and south Pangong Tso, Spanggur Gap, opposite Dumchele, Demchok sector, Kaurik, Tashigang, Barahoti.
Red dots represent sensitive and disputed locations on the line of actual control (LAC). Yellow dots represent select Chinese claims in Bhutan and tri-junction areas related to the Sino-India border dispute. Locations include Asaphila, Doklam, Longju, Tawang, Sumdorong Chu, Dichu area, Sakteng Wildlife Sanctuary.

SN	Disputed area / sector (alternate names)	Chinese Province	Indian State/UT	Operational control	Incidents/comments
1	Trans-Karakoram Tract (Shaksgam)	Xinjiang	Ladakh	China	Conditionally resolved between Pakistan and China based on the 1905 modification to Macartney–MacDonald Line, without the inclusion of India. India-controlled Indira Col West lies on its southern border at the India-Pakistan-China westernmost "operational" trijunction.
2	Aksai Chin	Xinjiang and Tibet	Ladakh	China	Served by Daulat Beg Oldi AGL, and Darbuk–Shyok–DBO Road. Padum AGL and Leh Airport are 2nd line of defence. China-controlled Shaksgam and Aksai Chin border the India-controlled Siachen area, disputed by Pakistan. See also 2013 Daulat Beg Oldi Incident, 2020 China–India skirmishes, Depsang Plains, Galwan, Pangong Tso, Hot Springs, Kongka Pass. Shyok as hot spots in this sector. Other contested locations include Samar Lungpa.
3	Demchok / Dêmqog (Demchok sector)	Tibet	Ladakh	India / China	Served by Fukche AGL. Padum AGL and Leh Airport are 2nd line of defence.
4	Chumar North	Tibet	Ladakh	India	Served by Nyoma AGL. Chumar sector has 2 noncontiguous areas, north and south. India has a road up to the claimed border. China does not have a road up to the border. Both India and China are also served by helipads.
5	Chumar South	Tibet	Ladakh	India	Served by Nyoma AGL. Chumar sector has 2 noncontiguous areas, north and south. India has a road up to the claimed border. China does not have a road up to the border. Both India and China are also served by helipads.
6	Kaurik (Sumdo)	Tibet	Himachal Pradesh	India	Served by dual-use Shimla Airport and Kullu-Manali Airport. Kibber-Rangrik AGL has been surveyed, which will be the closest AGL to the Chumar, Kaurik, and Tashigang-Shipki La disputed area, but as of July 2020 no progress has been made. Himachal Pradesh has a 250 km (160 mi) border with China. India has a road up to the claimed border at Bakiala.
7	Tashigang-Shipki La (Khab and Namgia)	Tibet	Himachal Pradesh	India	Served by dual-use Shimla Airport and Kullu-Manali Airport. Kibber-Rangrik AGL has been surveyed, which will be the closest AGL to the Chumar, Kaurik, and Tashigang-Shipki La disputed area, but as of July 2020 no progress has been made. Himachal Pradesh has a 250 km (160 mi) border with China. India has a road up to the claimed border at Bakiala.
8	Jadh Ganga Valley (also Mana Pass)	Tibet	Uttarakhand	India	The valley of the Jadh Ganga is claimed by China. The Indians control the whole extent of the Jadh Ganga. Some of the villages in the area are Pulam Sumda, Sang, Jadhang, Nelang, and Tirpani, which all lie in the valley of the Jadh Ganga.
9	Bara Hoti	Tibet	Uttarakhand	India	Chinyalisaur Airport primarily and Pithoragarh Airport secondarily serve Bara Hoti and Nelang-Pulam Sumda sectors as AGLs. ITBP has 42 BoPs (border outposts) in the Bara Hoti sector and the Mana Pass area (Pulam Sumda sector). Uttarakhand has a 350 km (220 mi) border with China. India is building roads in this sector, which will be completed by December 2020.
10	Part of Arunachal Pradesh (especially Tawang)	Tibet	Arunachal Pradesh	India	Tawang Air Force Station and AGLs at Aalo, Mechuka, Pasighat, Tuting, Vijoynagar, Walong and Ziro serve this sector. Most of India-controlled Arunachal Pradesh is also claimed by China, especially Tawang. See also 1987 Sino-Indian skirmish at Tawang.

Bhutan's Doklam area on the Sikkim-China-Bhutan tri-junction, disputed by China, in which Bhutan is assisted by India, has been kept out of this list; see also 2017 China–India border standoff at Doklam and Nathu La and Cho La clashes in Sikkim. India and China will hold the 9th round of military commander-level talks on 24 January 2021. The talks will be held in Moldo opposite to the Chushul sector in India.

== See also ==
- China–India relations
- 2024 India-China Border Patrol Agreement
- Annexation of Tibet by the People's Republic of China
- China containment policy
- Chinese salami slicing strategy
- Himalayan Rim
- India-China Border Roads
- List of disputed territories of China
- List of disputed territories of India
- List of territorial disputes
- McMahon Line
- Sino-Indian relations
- Sino-Indian War
