= Differing perceptions of the Line of Actual Control =

Differing perceptions or areas of differing perceptions was a theory to explain why border conflicts have arisen between China and India, since the Border Peace and Tranquility Agreement, 1993 has been signed. It maintains that the two sides have different perception of where the Line of Actual Control (LAC) between the territories of the two countries lies. Further, the Chinese have their own understanding of where the Indians perceive their LAC to be, and vice versa. For many decades India and China carried forward the differing perceptions theory.

India has called this as one of the causes for the loss of Indian territory to China's salami slicing. The existence of areas of differing perceptions resulted in "overlapping areas of influence, extending from a few hundred meters to tens of kilometers" and was "one of the reasons for Chinese to enhance their transgressions in Ladakh".

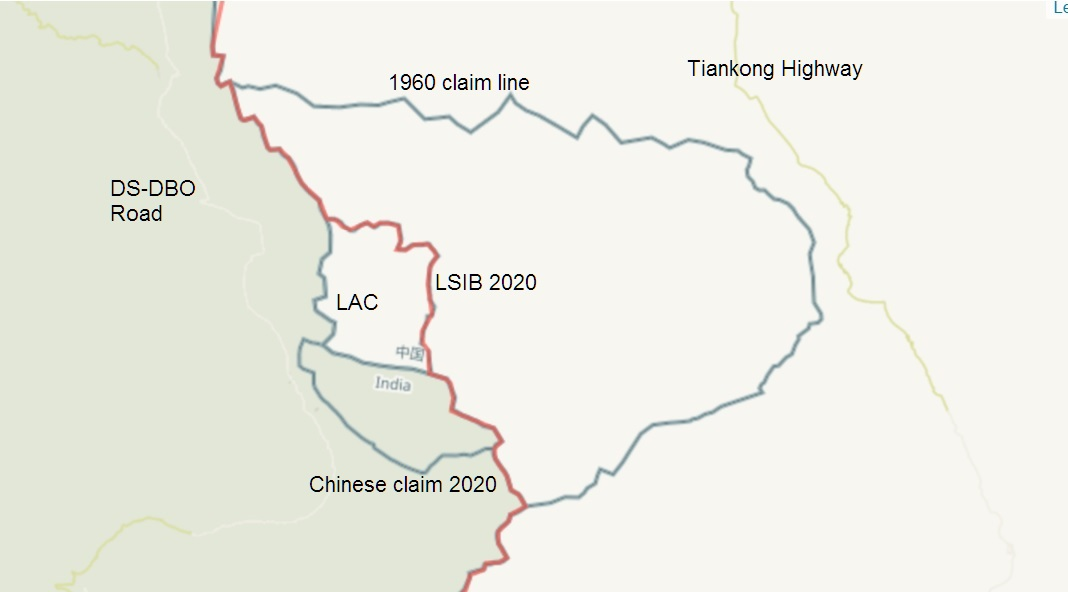
Differing perceptions in the Depsang Bulge area in northern Ladakh: the leftmost line indicating China's perception and the rightmost line India's perception. The middle green line represents the prevailing LAC as per the contributors to OpenStreetMap and the red line is that marked by the US Office of the Geographer. (Note: The red line is from "LSIB", or "Large-Scale International Boundaries", a data set published by the US Office of the Geographer and used widely for marking international boundaries, including in applications such as the Google Maps. The data set marked here is of Version 10, released in March 2020, visualised on OpenStreetMap at humdata.org.)

== Overview ==
Written in the Border Peace and Tranquility Agreement, 1993: "When necessary, the two sides shall jointly check and determine the segments of the line of actual control where they have different views as to its alignment". This phrase, "differences on the alignment", also finds mention in the 1996 agreement. Further the 1996 agreement uses the phrase "different perceptions":

Recognizing that the full implementation of some of the provisions of the present Agreement will depend on the two sides arriving at a common understanding of the alignment of the line of actual control in the India-China border areas, the two sides agree to [...] As an initial step in this process, they are clarifying the alignment of the line of actual control in those segments where they have different perceptions.

In the backdrop of the 2020–2021 China–India skirmishes, Defence Minister of India Rajnath Singh, used the phrase in a Lok Sabha statement, "...both (India, China) have different perceptions of LAC"; in the Rajya Sabha, "there is no common perception of the entire LAC", "there are some areas where the Chinese and Indian perceptions of LAC overlap". A Chinese foreign ministry statement in September 2020 stated that "China-India border LAC is very clear, that is the LAC on November 7, 1959. China announced it in the 1950s". In 2003 Asaphila as an area of differing perception was called out in the Parliament.

Confidence building measures, clarification mechanisms, peace and tranquility building measures have been agreed upon by both countries to deal with the tensions arising from the areas of differing perceptions. According to commentators, the number of areas of differing perceptions range from 12 to 18 locations to no perceptional differences.
