= Agreement on the Political Parameters and Guiding Principles for the Settlement of the India–China Boundary Question, 2005 =

2005 agreement between China and India

Agreement on the Political Parameters and Guiding Principles for the Settlement of the India–China Boundary Question
Agreement Between the Government of the Republic of India and the Government of the People's Republic of China on the Political Parameters and Guiding Principles for the Settlement of the India–China Boundary Question
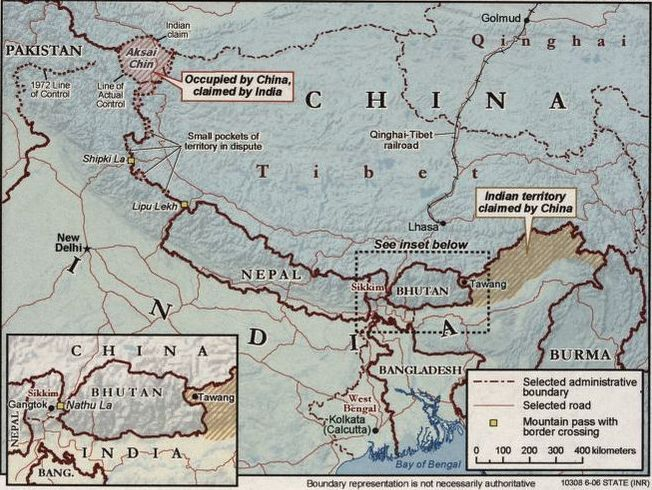
- The China–India border, showing two large disputed areas in Aksai Chin and Arunachal Pradesh and several smaller disputes (a map by the CIA)
- Type: Political settlement of the boundary question
- Context: India China boundary question
- Signed: 11 April 2005
- Location: New Delhi
- Condition: Ratification by China and India
- Parties: China; India
- Citations: Agreement
- Languages: Chinese; English; Hindi

The Agreement on the Political Parameters and Guiding Principles for the Settlement of the India–China Boundary Question is an agreement between India and China signed on 11 April 2005. The agreement is a direct outcome of the Special Representative (SR) mechanism that had been set up through a 2003 agreement.

== Background ==
The 1993, 1996 and 2005 agreements deal with military confidence building measures. However these agreements did not sufficiently cover the political aspect of the boundary settlement. Accordingly, in a 2003 agreement, "Declaration on Principles for Relations and Comprehensive Cooperation", the Special Representative mechanism had been set up. The SRs would "explore from the political perspective of the overall bilateral relationship the framework of a boundary settlement". The first five meetings of the SRs resulted in the signing of the 2005 agreement.

== Summary ==
1. The resolution and final solution of the boundary question will promote positive relations between India and China, "in accordance with the Five Principles of Peaceful Coexistence" and "principle of mutual and equal security".
2. In attainment of the solution the two sides will consider "historical evidence, national sentiments, practical difficulties and reasonable concerns and sensitivities of both sides, and the actual state of border areas"; the boundary should be along "well-defined geographical features"; interests of "settled populations in the border areas" to be considered; and delineation of the boundary to be done through modern and joint means.
3. Pending final solution, all dispute resolution mechanism bodies will continue to function as per their objectives.

== Impact ==
Article 3 of the agreement mentions "package settlement". A version of this had been put on the table informally by China as early as 1981; a package settlement as opposed to a sector by sector deal. The 2005 agreement had a direct effect on the claims aired in the package settlement.

Article VII, that "the two sides shall safeguard due interests of their settled populations in the border areas", resulted in China pushing the development of such "settled populations".

== See also ==
- India–China border agreements
  - 1988: India–China Joint Working Group on the boundary question
  - Confidence building measures
    - 1993: Border Peace and Tranquility Agreement
    - 1996: Agreement on Military Confidence Building Measures
    - 2005: Protocol for the Implementation of Military Confidence Building Measures
  - Political measures
    - 2003: Declaration on Principles for Relations and Comprehensive Cooperation
    - 2005: Agreement on the Political Parameters and Guiding Principles for the Settlement of the India–China Boundary Question
  - 2012: Agreement on the Establishment of a Working Mechanism for Consultation and Coordination on India–China Border Affairs
  - 2013: Border Defence Cooperation Agreement
  - 2020: 5 point statement
