= War and genocide =

Connection between the fields of genocide and war

War and genocide studies is an interdisciplinary subject that identifies and analyzes the relationship between war and genocide, as well as the structural foundations of associated conflicts. Disciplines involved may include political science, geography, economics, sociology, international relations, and history.

There is general consensus among scholars that the problems of war and genocide are intimately linked as the two often accompany each other. However, there are varying thoughts and theoretical perspectives on the topic as it continues to be a subject of scholarly analysis and debate.

== Description ==
Genocide is defined as the intentional destruction of a people, a term coined in 1944 by Polish lawyer Raphael Lemkin with the Greek word γένος (genos, "race, people") and the Latin suffix -cide ("act of killing"). The United Nations defines genocide in Article II of the Genocide Convention as:

Any of the following acts committed with intent to destroy, in whole or in part, a national, ethnical, racial or religious group, as such:

(a) Killing members of the group;

(b) Causing serious bodily or mental harm to members of the group;

(c) Deliberately inflicting on the group conditions of life calculated to bring about its physical destruction in whole or in part;

(d) Imposing measures intended to prevent births within the group;

(e) Forcibly transferring children of the group to another group.

Article 3 defines the crimes that can be punished under the convention:

(a) Genocide;
(b) Conspiracy to commit genocide;
(c) Direct and public incitement to commit genocide;
(d) Attempt to commit genocide;
(e) Complicity in genocide.

— Convention on the Prevention and Punishment of the Crime of Genocide, Article 3

The Genocide Convention establishes five prohibited acts that, when committed with the requisite intent, amount to genocide. Genocide is not just defined as wide scale massacre-style killings that are visible and well-documented. International law recognizes a broad range of forms of violence in which the crime of genocide can be enacted.

== Historical background ==
Norman Naimark writes:

throughout its history genocide has had a very close relationship to war. Even during periods of peace, the threat of war or the ostensible need to prepare for war can instigate genocidal situations. War is not a necessary precondition for genocide, and genocide does not necessarily occur during war. Still, genocide is most often associated with wartime intentions, policies, and actions. This is as true of ancient times as of the present.

Surveys of twentieth century cases, often considered the "Age of Genocide" identify that when genocide was committed, it was committed alongside the occurrence of some form of armed conflict. The Armenian Genocide, the Jewish Holocaust, the Genocide in East Pakistan, the Mayan Genocide, the Kurdish Genocide, the Tutsi Genocide, and the Bosnian Genocide are all respectively linked to the First World War, Second World War, the Bangladesh Liberation War, the Guatemalan Civil War, the Iran-Iraq War, the Rwandan Civil War, and the Bosnian War. Scholars further observe that this trend is continuing into the twenty-first century, because the Darfur Genocide and the Yazidi Genocide are also associated with respective ongoing conflicts in Western Sudan and Iraq. These observations have led many to conclude that genocides generally occur in wartime or they generally occur as a response to armed conflicts.

Scholars have also pointed to the introduction of concepts such as mass mobilization, mass political movements, mass media, and mass education as being important precedents for the concept of twentieth century genocide. Paul Bartrop observes that all cases of twentieth century genocide are accompanied with an aggressor's long-standing obsession with the physical, social, or cultural differences of a victim group as a threat so great that the aggressor believes mass annihilation in the only solution.

=== Human death toll ===
Together, War and genocide have historically caused the large-scale destruction and devastation of peoples because both forms of violence result in the deployment of violence through killing and physical harming which is perpetrated with the intention to destroy the power of the enemy, harm that often includes economic, political, and ideological coercion. An estimated 20 million people were killed as a result of the First World War with an additional 20 million wounded. The Armenian genocide alone resulted in the death of 600,000 to one million Armenians directly targeted with violence. By 1918, an estimated 90 percent of the Armenian population in the Ottoman Empire was either killed or displaced. In the Second World War, an estimated 66 million people were killed in total and upwards of 6 million Jewish people were killed as a result of targeted violence.

== Theoretical perspectives ==
Jeffrey S. Bachman identifies a continuum for schools of thought considering the relationship between war and genocide identifying the War or Genocide school, that believes there is no direct relationship between war and genocide, and the War is Genocide school, that believes genocide is inseparable from war, as the two extremes. Most scholars fall somewhere between these two positions.

=== War is Genocide School ===
The War is Genocide school is one extreme end of the spectrum that contends, as its synonymizing suggests, that war and genocide are one and the same. There are no scholars that identify with this position, rather it is a purely theoretical designation for its use in contextualizing other schools of thought. Criticisms of a purely War is Genocide approach include the fact that it does not consider defensive violence as separate from aggressive violence.

=== War or Genocide School ===
The War or Genocide school contends that the conduct of war should be wholly considered separately from genocide. Helen Fein insists that connecting mass killing to genocide conflates "war crimes and genocide without examining the pattern of destruction and the selection of victims". Irving Horowitz and Mark Levene distinguishes between armed conflicts and genocide by the moment at which the aggressor's aim in an armed civil conflict turns from defeating the enemy to a systematic effort to destroy them. Irving Horowitz also distinguishes war from genocide based on who is waging it: "democratic and libertarian states wage war as an instrument of foreign policy…genocide on the other hand, is the operational handmaiden of a particular social system, the totalitarian system,". Similarly, on the subject of nuclear war, Barbara Harff makes the distinction based on intent: "Whether or not nuclear strikes are genocidal depends on the intent of those who order them. Limited and defensive use of nuclear weapons are not inherently genocidal, even if they have the unwanted consequences of massive civilian deaths,". Scholars in the War or Genocide school as a whole reject any fluidity between people killed in war and victims of genocide.

=== War and Genocide School ===
The War and Genocide school of thought encompasses the vast majority of scholars and contends that those killed in war can be considered victims of genocide. Scholars in this school reference the genocidal capacities of certain methods of war, such as nuclear weapons, pattern-, fire-, and carpet-bombing, or other indiscriminate strategies, as the use of genocidal violence.

=== War as Genocide School ===
Genocide has traditionally been distinguished by the innocent, defenseless, or civilian status of its victims. Manus Midlarsky defines genocide as "understood to be the state-sponsored systematic mass murder of innocent and helpless men, women, and children". Similarly Irving Horowitz defines genocide as "a structural and systematic destruction of innocent people by a state bureaucratic apparatus". Finally, Kurt Jonassohn and Frank Chalk define genocide as "a form of one-sided mass killing".

However the War as Genocide school contends that other groups such as military personnel should also be designated victims of genocide, and do not resign their right to life when engaging in defensive violence. Israel Charny believes that "the definition of genocide adopted in law and by professional social scientists must match the realities of life, so that there should be no situation in which thousands and even millions of defenseless victims of mass murder do not 'qualify' as victims of genocide,". This school suggests that genocidal violence includes aggressive violence against armed victims, when the aim is to harm and kill a substantial number of people. The War as Genocide school does not necessarily equate war with genocide, as the War Is Genocide school does, but it does recognize a causal link between the two and acknowledges that aggressive violence may constitute genocide. This school also invites scholars to reconsider the use of war in international affairs as well as the concept of genocide as being based on the perceived innocence of those attacked. Some proponents of this school argue that some examples of twentieth century war is genocidal by nature, given the enormous number of deaths.

== See also ==
- Allegations of genocide in Donbas
- Allegations of genocide in the October 7 Hamas-led attack on Israel
- Allegations of genocide of Ukrainians in the Russo-Ukrainian War
- Genocide denial
- Genocide justification
  - Accusation in a mirror
- Genocide recognition politics
- Palestinian genocide accusation
- Restraint (military)
- Colonialism and genocide
  - Genocide of indigenous peoples
- Genocides in history
  - Genocides in history (before 1490)
  - Genocides in history (World War I through World War II)
  - Genocides in history (1946 to 1999)
  - 21st-century genocides
- List of genocides

== Sources ==
- Naimark, Norman M. (2017). Genocide: A World History. Oxford University Press. ISBN 978-0-19-976526-3.
