= Border Defence Cooperation Agreement =

India-China border security and stability agreement

Agreement between the Government of the Republic of India and the Government of the People's Republic of China on Border Defence Cooperation
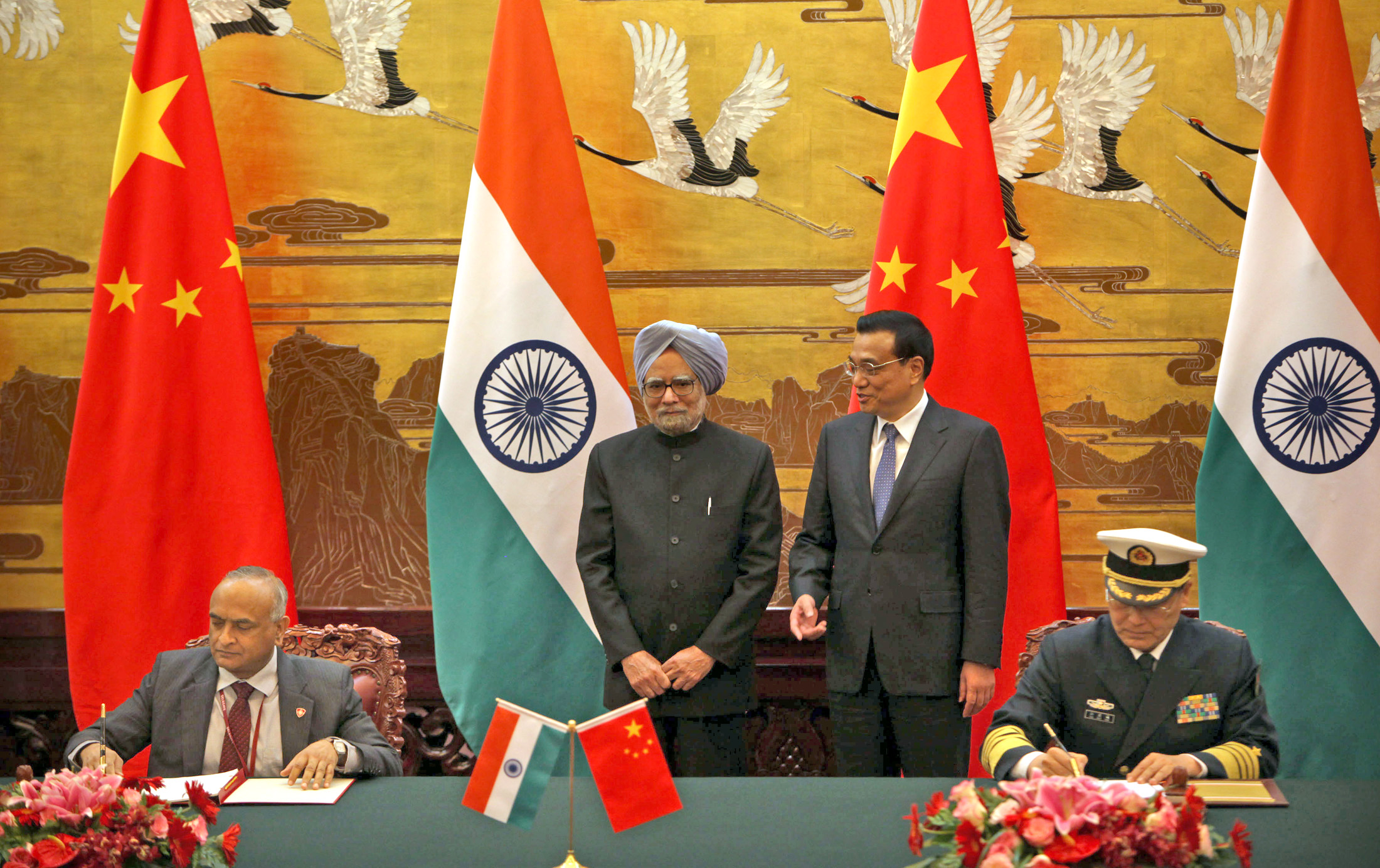
- The Indian Defence Secretary, R. K. Mathur and the PLA Deputy Chief of General Staff, Lt. Gen. Sun Jianguo signing the Agreement in Beijing on 23 October 2013. Premier Li Keqiang and Prime Minister Manmohan Singh present.
- Type: Border management Confidence Building Measure
- Context: India China boundary question; India-China Strategic and Cooperative Partnership for Peace and Prosperity
- Signed: 23 October 2013
- Location: Great Hall of the People, Tiananmen Square, Beijing
- Condition: Ratification by China and India
- Parties: China; India
- Citations: Agreement
- Languages: Chinese; English; Hindi

Full text
- India-China Border Agreement 2013 at Wikisource

The Agreement between India and China on Border Defence Cooperation (BDCA) covers border stability and security, information asymmetry, smuggling, socio-economic reconstruction, environment and disease transmission along the line of actual control. It is an incremental addition to the previous border agreements related to the Sino-Indian border dispute.

BDCA is one of the growing number of defence cooperation agreements being signed between countries worldwide.

== Background ==
China proposed the BDCA as early as the 5th India-China annual defence dialogue (ADD) in January 2013. The following months saw negotiations and counter-proposals by India.

In April 2013, India reported a Chinese PLA incursion at the mouth of Depsang Bulge near the Line of Actual Control in eastern Ladakh. This three week face-off was one of the border incidents that took place during the drafting of the agreement. In July 2013, India also saw PLA movement into Chumar and transgressions in Barahoti and Dichu.

In July 2013, the Indian Minister of Defence met his counterpart General Chang Wanquan, as well as Chinese Prime Minister Li Keqiang and State Councilor Yang Jiechi. In a joint statement, with regard to "peace and tranquility in their border areas" both sides appreciated "that border defence cooperation would make a significant contribution in that regard" and "they agreed on an early conclusion of negotiations for a proposed agreement on border defence cooperation between the two Governments".

The agreement was finalized at a meeting of the Joint Working Group a few weeks before it was finally signed in Beijing in October 2013.

=== Agreements ===
BDCA mentions the "India-China Strategic and Cooperative Partnership for Peace and Prosperity" and four previous border agreements:

- Border Peace and Tranquility Agreement, 1993
- Agreement on Confidence Building Measures, 1996
- Protocol for the Implementation of Military Confidence Building Measures, 2005
- Working Mechanism for Consultation and Coordination on India-China Border Affairs, 2012

== Articles ==
BDCA has ten articles. The agreement outlines ways to implement border defence cooperation "on the basis of their respective laws and relevant bilateral agreements". This includes the exchange of information, joint smuggling efforts, assistance in locating trans-border movement, disease transmission or "any other way mutually agreed upon the two sides". The agreement goes on to elaborate on mechanisms for implementing this border defence cooperation including flag meeting, border personal meetings, hotlines and meetings between representatives at various fora. This agreement goes a step further by saying that cooperation can be enhanced through CBMs such as cultural exchanges, "non-contact" sports, military exercises, and "small scale tactical exercises along the line of actual control in the India-China border areas." Military clauses cover tailing patrols, seeking clarification in areas of differing perceptions of the Line of Actual Control and practice military restraint in all ways. The agreement clearly stated that the agreement would be honoured irrespective of the alignment of the LAC. The agreement concludes in an elastic nature, "It may be revised, amended or terminated with the consent of the two sides. Any revision or amendment, mutually agreed by the two sides, shall form an integral part of this Agreement'.

== Aftermath ==
The BDCA was met with skepticism from a number of Indian analysts. Monika Chansoria, head of the China-study program Centre for Land Warfare Studies, called the agreement as a Beijing "engineered" with no clear progress or differentiation from previous agreements, adding that the main issue of resolving the border dispute was not part of the BDCA. Jayadeva Ranade pointed out that there was no reference to status quo, ambiguity in the way certain arguments were framed including lines related to infrastructure development. However, D Suba Chandran, director at Institute of Peace and Conflict Studies, stated "even the worst critique would not find faults with it [the agreement]".

In a press conference on 24 October 2013, a day after BDCA was signed, Ministry of Foreign Affairs of the People's Republic of China spokesperson Hua Chunying stated that "Over the past decades, with the concerted efforts of the two countries, negotiations on the boundary question have sustained a sound momentum and the border areas are basically peaceful and tranquil."

During the 2020-21 China-India border skirmishes the BDCA and other border agreements failed in their purpose.

== See also ==
- Restraint (military)

== Bibliography ==
- Das, Rup Narayan (2013). "Resilient Sino-Indian Relationship: Assessing Prime Minister's 2013 Visit". Indian Foreign Affairs Journal. 8 (4): 387–399. ISSN 0973-3248. JSTOR 45341908.
