= Five Principles of Peaceful Coexistence =

Chinese international relations concept

The Five Principles of Peaceful Coexistence (Chinese: 和平共处五项原则; pinyin: Hépíng gòngchǔ wǔ xiàng yuánzé) are the official foreign relations principles of the People's Republic of China (PRC).

The principles were first mentioned in the 1954 Sino-Indian Agreement. Also known as Panchsheel (Hindi: पंचशील, lit. 'five principles'), these principles were subsequently adopted in a number of resolutions and statements, including in the preamble to the country's constitution in 1978.

== Principles ==
The Five Principles, as stated in the 1954 Sino-Indian Agreement, are:

1. mutual respect for each other's territorial integrity and sovereignty,
2. mutual non aggression,
3. mutual non-interference in each other's internal affairs,
4. equality and co-operation for mutual benefit, and
5. peaceful co-existence

These principles are a strict interpretation of the Westphalian norms of state sovereignty. Since its inclusion in the Five Principles, China has emphasized non-interventionism as major principle of its foreign policy.

== History ==
According to the Ministry of Foreign Affairs, CCP Chairman Mao Zedong first articulated the concept behind the Five Principles of Peaceful Coexistence at the proclamation of the People's Republic of China on 1 October 1949, where he said the new Chinese government would engage with anyone that agreed to "the principles of equality, mutual benefit, and mutual respect for territorial sovereignty".

According to V. V. Paranjpe, an Indian diplomat and expert on China, the principles of Panchsheel were first publicly formulated by Zhou Enlai — "While receiving the Indian delegation to the Tibetan trade talks on Dec. 31, 1953 [...] he enunciated them as "five principles governing China's relations with foreign countries." Then in a joint statement in Delhi on 18 June 1954, the principles were emphasized by the Prime Minister of India, Jawaharlal Nehru, and Premier Zhou Enlai in a broadcast speech made at the time of the Asian Prime Ministers Conference in Colombo, Sri Lanka just a few days after the signing of the Sino-Indian treaty in Beijing. Nehru went so far as to say: "If these principles were recognized in the mutual relations of all countries, then indeed there would hardly be any conflict and certainly no war." It has been suggested that the five principles had partly originated as the five principles of the Indonesian state. In June 1945 Sukarno, the Indonesian nationalist leader, had proclaimed five general principles, or pancasila, on which future institutions were to be founded. Indonesia became independent in 1949.

In 1954, after engaging in similar talks with the Burmese government, the three countries agreed to change the fourth point from "mutual gain" to "mutual benefit". The first point was changed from "mutual respect for territorial sovereignty" to "mutual respect for sovereignty and territorial integrity" in 1955. The five principles were incorporated in modified form in a statement of Ten Principles of Peaceful Coexistence (known as Dasasila Bandung) issued in April 1955 at the historic Asian-African Conference in Bandung, Indonesia, which did more than any other meeting to form the idea that post-colonial states had something special to offer the world. "A resolution on peaceful co-existence jointly presented by India, Yugoslavia and Sweden was unanimously adopted in 1957 by the United Nations General Assembly". The Five Principles as they had been adopted in Colombo and elsewhere formed the basis of the Non-Aligned Movement, established in Belgrade, Yugoslavia in 1961.

China has often emphasized its close association with the Five Principles. It had put them forward, as the Five Principles of Peaceful Coexistence, at the start of negotiations that took place in Delhi from December 1953 to April 1954 between the Delegation of the PRC Government and the Delegation of the Indian Government on the relations between the two countries with respect to the disputed territories of Aksai Chin and what China calls South Tibet and India Arunachal Pradesh. The 28 April 1954 agreement mentioned above was set to last for eight years. When it lapsed, relations were already souring, the provision for renewal of the agreement was not taken up, and the Sino-Indian War broke out between the two sides.

In 1979, when Atal Bihari Vajpayee, then India's Foreign Minister and future Prime Minister, went to China, the word Panchsheel, found its way into the conversation during talks with the Chinese. In 2004, on the 50th anniversary of the treaty, the Ministry of Foreign Affairs of the People's Republic of China, said that "a new international order on the basis of the Five Principles of Peaceful Coexistence" should be built. In the same year, Premier Wen Jiabao said,

It is on the basis of the Five Principles that China has established and developed diplomatic relations with 165 countries and carried out trade, economic, scientific, technological and cultural exchanges and cooperation with over 200 countries and regions. It is on the basis of the Five Principles that China has, through peace negotiations, resolved the boundary issues with most neighbors and maintained peace and stability in its surrounding areas. And it is on the basis of the Five Principles that China has provided economic and technical aid with no political strings attached [...]

Deng Xiaoping championed the Five Principles of Peaceful Coexistence stating that they should be used as the "guiding norms of international relations". He emphasized that China should follow the Five Principles of Peaceful Coexistence in managing its foreign relations with countries that were organized according to different political beliefs and social systems.

In June 2014, Vice President of India Hamid Ansari was welcomed by China into the Great Hall of the People in Beijing for the commemoration of the 60th anniversary of the signing Panchsheel Treaty. In 2017, CCP General Secretary Xi Jinping said that "China is ready to work with India to seek guidance from the five principles of Panchsheel".

=== Other contexts ===
The Five Principles of Peaceful Coexistence are Chinese political norms articulated in other contexts as well. In 1982, Hu Yaobang's report to the 12th National Congress of the Chinese Communist Party stated, "China adheres to an independent foreign policy and develops relationships with other countries under the guidance of the Five Principles of Peaceful Coexistence." According to the view stated by Hu in this report, "China will never be dependent on any big country or group of countries, nor will it yield to the pressure of any big country [...] The Five Principles of Peaceful Coexistence apply to our relations with all countries, including socialist countries."

These principles are also part of the discourse in China-Pakistan relations. In a speech to Pakistani parliament in 1999, Chairman of the Standing Committee of China's National People's Congress Li Peng stated, "China has all along pursued an independent foreign policy of peace and established and developed relations with other countries on the basis of the Five Principles of Peaceful Coexistence." The principles were codified in the April 2005 Treaty of Friendship, Cooperation, and Good Neighborly Relations signed during a visit by Chinese Premier Wen Jiabao to Pakistan.

The Five Principles of Peaceful Coexistence are the fundamental political norms underlying the China-Arab States Cooperation Forum (CACF) and the Forum on China-Africa Cooperation (FOCAC).

Since the 2011 NATO intervention in Libya, China has more strongly advocated for the Five Principles of Peaceful Coexistence.

China's United Nations Security Council voting behavior reflects its commitment to the Five Principles of Peaceful Coexistence. From 1991 to 2020, the vast majority of China's abstentions and all of its vetoes have occurred on issues that involve territorial integrity, primarily sanctions and the jurisdiction of the International Criminal Court. In her analysis of China's Security Council voting behavior, Professor Dawn C. Murphy concludes, "These votes directly correspond to China's promotion of the Five Principles, especially the principles of mutual respect for territory and sovereignty and mutual noninterference in the internal affairs of other states."

== Commentary and criticism ==
Bhimrao Ambedkar said of the treaty in the Rajya Sabha "I am indeed surprised that our Hon'ble Prime Minister is taking this Panchsheel seriously [...] you must be knowing that Panchsheel is one of the significant parts of the Buddha Dharma. If Shri Mao had even an iota of faith in Panchsheel, he would have treated the Buddhists in his country in a different manner." In 1958, Acharya Kriplani had said the Panchsheel was "born in sin" because it was set forth with the destruction of a nation; India had approved of ancient Tibet's destruction.

In 2014, Zhao Gancheng, a Chinese scholar said that on the surface Panchsheel seemed very superficial; but under the general secretaryship of Xi Jinping, it has become relevant again. In 2014, Ram Madhav wrote a piece in the Indian Express titled, "Moving beyond the Panchsheel deception" and said that if India and China decide to move on from the Panchsheel framework, it will benefit both countries.

== List of documents containing the five principles ==
=== China ===
- Preamble to the Constitution of China

=== China and Afghanistan ===
- Friendship and Mutual Non-Aggression Agreement, 1960
- Boundary Treaty, 1963

=== China and Burma ===
- Joint Statement, June 20, 1954
- Treaty of Friendship and Mutual Non-Aggression Agreement, 1960
- Agreement on the Question of Boundary, 1960
- Boundary Treaty, 1960

=== China and Cambodia ===
- Joint Statement, 1958
- Treaty of Friendship and Mutual Non-Aggression Agreement, 1960
- Joint Communique, 1960

=== China and India ===
- India China joint press communique, 23 December 1988
- Border Peace and Tranquility Agreement, 1993
- Agreement on Military Confidence Building Measures, 1996
- Declaration on Principles for Relations and Comprehensive Cooperation, 2003
- Protocol on Modalities for the Implementation of Military Confidence Building Measures along the Line of Actual Control, 2005
- Agreement on the Political Parameters and Guiding Principles for the Settlement of the India-China Boundary Question, 2005
- China-India Strategic and Cooperative Partnership for Peace and Prosperity, 2005
- MOU between the Ministry of Defence of India and the Ministry of National Defence of China for Exchanges and Cooperation in the field of Defence, 2006
- Joint Statement on Building a Closer Developmental Partnership, 2014

=== China and Nepal ===
- Agreement on the normalisation of diplomatic relations, 1955
- Treaty between the PRC and the Kingdom of Nepal, 1956
- Agreement on Economic Assistance to Nepal, 1956
- Agreement on the Question of Boundary, 1960
- Treaty of peace and friendship, 1960
- Boundary Treaty, 1961

=== China and Pakistan ===
- Boundary Agreement, 1963 (Ten principles)
- Treaty of Friendship, Cooperation, and Good Neighborly Relations, 2005

=== China and Russia ===
- The Declaration of the Russian Federation and the People's Republic of China on the Promotion of International Law, 25 June 2016

== See also ==
- History of Indian foreign relations
- Bandung Conference#Declaration or "Ten Principles of Peaceful Coexistence"
