= Restraint (military) =

Limitation of actions during participation of conflict

Restraint in the military or armed groups, during war or insurgency, refers to "behaviour that indicates deliberate actions to limit the use of violence" with the aim of upholding the modern and professional principles of war, humanitarian rights, and minimizing political and military repercussions.

== Background ==
In the 17th century Hugo Grotius attempted to frame laws to act as a restraint on violence during war. However rather than law, fear of retaliation or pragmatism have had more impact.

Throughout the Christian world I observed a lack of restraint in relation to war, such as even barbarous races should be ashamed of; I observed that men rush to arms for slight causes, or no cause at all, and that when arms have once been taken up there is no longer any respect for law, divine or human; it is as if, in accordance with a general decree, frenzy had openly been let loose for the committing of all crimes.

— Hugo Grotius, De jure belli ac pacis (The Law of War and Peace), trans. Francis Kelsey (Carnegie edition, 1925), Prol. sect. 28.

Modern codification of restraints with regard to weapons and actions during war at an international level includes the Hague Conventions of 1899 and 1907, the 1929 Geneva Convention for the Amelioration of the Condition of the Wounded and Sick in Armies in the Field and the Geneva Convention relative to the Protection of Civilian Persons in Time of War of 1950. In 1977 Howard S. Levie says that a problem with the area of combat restraints is that "The problem in this area, as in many other areas, is not lack of law, it is lack of compliance with the law." More recently, the United States Armed Forces Principles of Joint Operations lists 12 principles of which "restraint" is one. Restraint became a part of the principles for the US military as early as 1990 when it was added to the principles of military operations other than war.

Restraints on war arise from both political and military policies. Connections between both these forms of policies can help increase the overall restraint. This may refer to military-strategic restraint, say through disconnected military planning and inadequate political direction; restraint from killing a non-combatant even at the expenses of incurring greater military casualties; restraint from excessive or disproportionate violence, use of indiscriminate weaponry, sexual violence, destruction of health infrastructure; restraint during reprisals and retaliation. Socialization and indoctrination of this restraint may be through training, hierarchy, doctrine, rules of engagement, constitutional law and force. The Australian Army's Royal Military College in Duntroon tests ethical compliance under extreme fatigue and stress, which in turn helps inculcate restraint under duress in real world situations. Analysing patterns of violence and restraint help identify violence that is ordered as compared to excessive violence despite no orders for the same. It would also help to identity causes of escalation and de-escalation. Over time, the number of situations in which restraint is expected has increased. Analysing periods of restraint as compared to violence can help identify the motivations behind restraint and in turn guide policy to predicting and controlling the violence. Lack of restraint can cause a massacre, unrestrained war, unlimited war or total war.

== Related concepts ==
From February 2010, ISAF in Afghanistan followed a policy of 'courageous restraint' during Operation Enduring Freedom. The policy advocated nonlethal force against non-combatants even in the most difficult of situations.

Scholars and other commentators have labelled India's approach to retaliation, military strategy and other geo-political issues as 'strategic restraint'. However others argue against this label or signal a shift from it in recent years.

Scholar James Ron put forward the idea of 'savage restraint' following a study of the Israeli-Palestinian conflict.

During the Palestinian uprising, Israeli troops used substantial violence to suppress Palestinian resistance to military occupation. At the same time, however, soldiers sought to maintain an aura of legality, limiting much of their violence to non-lethal, police-like methods, distorted though they were. Political and military elites knew the mission was to suppress the rebellion as quickly as possible, while simultaneously limiting Palestinian fatalities. [...] prompted Israeli leaders and their troops to develop innovative methods of non-lethal punishment which promoted Palestinian suffering, while avoiding overly blatant violations of formal procedure. Israeli army regulations governing the use of force were, thus, both constraining and enabling, limiting the intensity of violence, while permitting non-lethal distortion and elaboration. I termed the resulting repertoire of violence "savage restraint".

== See also ==
- Indiscriminate attack
- Israeli bombing of the Gaza Strip
- Just war theory
- Proportionality (law)
- Restraint (book)
- War and genocide
