= Border Peace and Tranquility Agreement, 1993 =

Agreement between China and Indian regarding border management

Agreement on the Maintenance of Peace and Tranquility along the Line of Actual Control in the India–China Border Areas
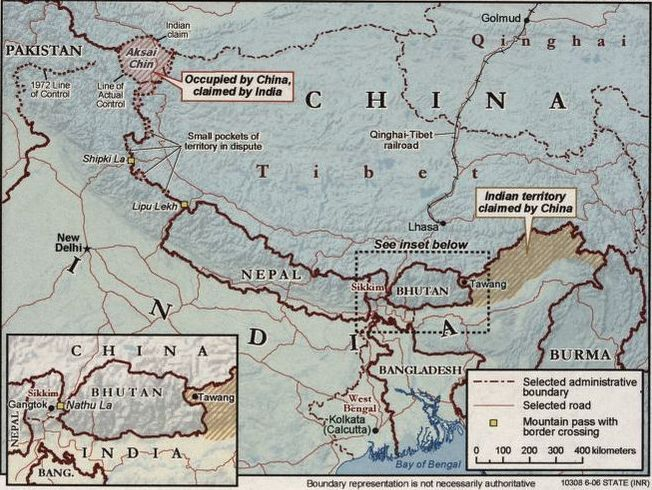
- China–India border, showing two large disputed areas in Aksai Chin and Arunachal Pradesh and several smaller disputes (map by CIA)
- Type: Standstill agreement Border management Confidence building measures
- Context: India China boundary question
- Signed: 7 September 1993
- Location: Great Hall of the People, Beijing, China
- Condition: Ratification by China and India
- Parties: China; India
- Languages: Chinese; English; Hindi

The Border Peace and Tranquility Agreement (BPTA or MPTA; formally the Agreement on the Maintenance of Peace and Tranquility along the Line of Actual Control in the India–China Border Areas) is an agreement signed by China and India in September 1993, agreeing to maintain the status quo on their mutual border pending an eventual boundary settlement. It was followed by the Agreement on Military Confidence Building Measures in 1996.

== Etymology ==
The final agreement was in three languages, English, Chinese and Hindi, and it was stated in the agreement that 'all three texts (have) equal validity'. The words "peace and tranquility" are used in the English version of the agreement. In the Hindi version the words शांति and अमन are used. In the Chinese version 和平 and 安宁 are used to explain peace and tranquility. Tranquility comes from French tranquilité and Latin tranquillitatem.

== 1993 agreement ==
=== Background ===
Political relations following the 1962 war only saw signs of improvement towards the later 1970s and 80s. Ties had remained strained until then also because of Chinese attraction to Pakistan during India Pakistan wars in 1965 and 1971. Restored ambassadorial relations in 1976, a visit by India's foreign minister to Peking in 1979 and a visit by the Chinese Foreign Minister to India in 1981, led to eight rounds of (border) talks between the two countries until 1988. Scholar Sumit Ganguly postulates that one of the reasons for India to initiate the restored ambassadorial relations in 1976 might have been the change in status of Sikkim and China's reaction to it. The other two reasons given by Ganguly are a change in leadership in China and Bangladesh.

The first round of border talks were in December 1981. Negligible progress was made in the first three rounds of talks. In the fourth round it was decided that other areas of relations should be normalized without linking them to the border issues. This caused tensions to decrease to a point where during the fifth round, the border issue was again confronted head on but no outcome was made for numerous reasons including domestic incidents such as the assassination of Indian Prime Minister. The seventh round in July 1986 was held in the background of the Sumdorong Chu standoff. The eight round ultimately led to a visit of the Indian Prime Minister to China in 1988, a visit of the Chinese Premier to India in 1992 and then a visit of Indian President to China in 1992. All this preceded and led to the 1993 agreement. The Joint Working Group (JWG) on the boundary question was set up in 1988 to recommend solutions to the border dispute. (Note: Joint groups were also formed in the sectors of economy and science.) Prior to the 1993 agreement, a trade agreement was signed in 1984, followed by a cultural cooperation agreement in 1988. Military dialogue was also initiated with respective visits of India's National Defence College and the PLA's National Defence University in 1990 and 1992. In July 1992 by India's Defence Minister visited China. There were also exchanges between various think tanks of both countries.

International events, significantly the breakup of the Soviet Union, and internal events such as the Tiananmen Square protests, affected policy in India and China. Further India's economic liberalisation in India required that India maintain a period of peace for it to recover from the economic collapse of 1990–91. India and China needed a basis for maintaining the peace. The LAC was the basis on which that peace would be legally founded. Further, the term "LAC" had been useful to China from the 1950s up until the 1980s as it provided a dynamic term for which to base their border aggression. However, by 1992 clarity emerged on both sides, with each side having moved forward as far as possible in most areas, militarily face to face, that it was common interest to find a solution.

=== Drafting and negotiations ===
India drafted the initial version of the agreement. It was suggested that the border could be called the line of peace or tranquility. But China put forward the phrase "Line of Active Control". It seemed to Shivshankar Menon, one of the negotiators and drafters, that the Chinese wanted that a phrase they suggest be used. This insistence was a larger part of their practice of ensuring psychological dominance. In the end, both sides agreed upon the term Line of Actual Control, the phrase that Zhou had used in 1959. Hence, the 1993 became the first bilateral agreement between China and India to contain the phrase Line of Actual Control.

The LAC at the time the agreement was signed was being referenced. A provision to sort out issues related to crisscrossing patrol routes in at least 13 locations was also inserted. Negotiating these points with the Chinese proved to the most contentious. The other points such as reducing force levels were passed without much issue. Negotiations and drafting started in July 1992. The draft agreed on by the negotiators of both sides was finalised by June 1993. The LAC agreement, along with agreements related to environment and broadcasting, were signed on September 7 in Beijing during the visit of Prime Minister P. V. Narasimha Rao.

=== Agreement ===
The agreement opened with the Five Principles of Peaceful Coexistence that had been agreed upon in the Sino–Indian Agreement of 1954. Each of the five points were mentioned. This was followed by the nine points of the agreement. It was agreed that the India-China boundary question would be resolved through peaceful means and that an "ultimate solution" to the boundary question existed. Force levels would be regulated and confidence building measures would be developed to maintain peace in areas along the LAC. Military exercises in these areas were also to regulated. Contingencies were to be dealt with peacefully. Air intrusions along LAC were to be minimised. It was also agreed that "the two sides agree that references to the line of actual control in this Agreement do not prejudice their respective positions on the boundary question". Consultations would be the basis of reducing force levels, maintaining peace and as a way forward. The agreement mentioned the "India-China Joint Working Group on the boundary question". The agreement created a group of diplomatic and military experts (later referred to as the "India-China Diplomatic and Military Expert Group") to assist the Joint Working Group in "resolution of differences between the two sides on the alignment of the line of actual control".

=== Aftermath ===
The Indian Prime Minister and Foreign Minister, in closed door meetings, had informed political leaders and members of the opposition before the agreement was signed. As a result of this domestic diplomacy the agreement was received smoothly in India. The first issue that had to be dealt by the two countries was the resolution of the Sumdorong Chu standoff. It would only be resolved in 1995. By 1994, China signed border agreements with at least 5 other countries.

The standard operating procedures and bilateral mechanisms that were put in place since the 1993 agreement helped make the India-China LAC relatively one of India's most peaceful borders for a number of years despite remaining undelineated or undemarcated. The focus of the agreement was on maintaining peace and tranquility, and not on resolving the border dispute. The border dispute would become a smaller part of the India-China relations as relations in other areas would significantly increase.

Two points in the 1993 agreement remained unfulfilled. That of mutual security and an agreement on minimal force levels. The aspect of military border infrastructure was not covered. The agreements applied to border management and not to tactical military situations. Both sides would go on to make serious violations of the agreement.

== Violation of agreements ==
Agreements signed between India and China between 1993 and 2013 are incrementally linked. According to sinologist B. R. Deepak, following the Galwan Valley clash, "all the agreements were now effectively left in tatters". Many of the articles in these agreements have had no effect on the on ground situation at the LAC.

In numerous border incidents the agreements have been adhered to, successfully maintaining peace, or in other words, successfully preventing conflict. The agreements are not solely responsible for this success. Political will and other interests in a peaceful border have also been responsible. On the other hand, the agreements have also been seriously and completely violated on numerous occasions, most recently during the 2020 China–India skirmishes.

== See also ==
- India China border agreements
  - 1988: India-China Joint Working Group on the boundary question
  - Confidence building measures
    - 1993: Border Peace and Tranquility Agreement
    - 1996: Agreement on Military Confidence Building Measures
    - 2005: Protocol for the Implementation of Military Confidence Building Measures
  - Political measures
    - 2003: Declaration on Principles for Relations and Comprehensive Cooperation
    - 2005: Agreement on the Political Parameters and Guiding Principles for the Settlement of the India-China Boundary Question
  - 2012: Agreement on the Establishment of a Working Mechanism for Consultation and Coordination on India-China Border Affairs
  - 2013: Border Defence Cooperation Agreement
  - 2020: 5-point statement
