= Report of the Officials on the Boundary Question =

Bilateral China–India commission

Report of the Officials of the Governments of India and the People's Republic of China on the Boundary Question refers to a report with two versions, one Indian and one Chinese, that record the proceedings of a series of meetings between Indian and Chinese officials in 1960. They were first published by the Indian Ministry of External Affairs in 1960–1961.

== Background ==
Following the incidents of 1959, the Prime Ministers of India and China met between 19 and 25 April 1960 in New Delhi for the purpose of discussing the boundary question. However the Prime Ministers were not able to resolve the differences that had developed. Accordingly, the Prime Ministers delegated the talks to officials from their respective countries. According to the joint communique on 25 April:

The two Prime Ministers, therefore, agreed that officials of the two Governments should meet and examine, check and study all historical documents, records, accounts, maps and other material relevant to the boundary question, which each side relied upon in support of its stand, and draw up a report for submission to the two Governments. This report would list the points on which there was agreement and the points on which there was disagreement or which should be examined more fully and clarified.

The research for the Indian side for the Officials talks were done under S Gopal, the Head of the Historical Division of the Ministry of External Affairs.

== Aftermath ==
The Report of the officials was placed before the Indian parliament in February 1961.

China accused India of "imperialism".

== Commentary ==
Olaf Caroe, in his review of the reports, found them to share "no common ground". Caroe gives scathing remarks for the Chinese approach; in contrast, he commended India's respect for logic and clarity of argumentation. In another review in 1961, G. F. Hudson writes that "this publication is indispensable for anyone taking a serious interest in the subject; its only defect is in the inadequacy of the maps provided, for a matter of controversy which is so essentially geographical cannot be properly understood without plentiful cartography."

In a 1961 commentary on the report, Subhash Chandra Sarker wrote "There was too much of mutual distrust between the two sides to enable them to come to any agreement...[...] By taking the initiative in bringing out the reports of the two teams of officials, the Government of India has at least demonstrated its confidence in the correctness of its own stand."

A Hsinhua commentary on the report published in April 1962 stated that "India’s assertion that the alignment it claims has treaty basis runs counter to facts... the alignment claimed by India is groundless... Indian maps are full of confusion and inconsistencies... The Indian side distorts the facts, creates side-issues and broadens the controversy... India adopts an attitude of imposing its will on others, thus making the Boundary Question more difficult and complicated".

Jagat Mehta would go on to say that the "credit for refining the punchline of (the) conclusion goes to Gopal" — "The facts therefore demand respect for this boundary, defined by nature, confirmed by history and sanctified by "the laws of nations"." Ambassador Eric Gonsalves has said that the reports were "more a legal justification of the existing border claims than an attempt to negotiate".
