= Special Representative mechanism on the India–China boundary question =

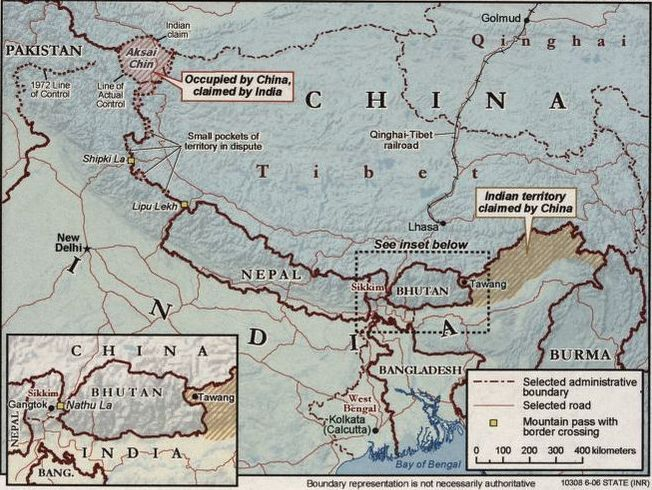
The China–India border, showing two large disputed areas in Aksai Chin and Arunachal Pradesh and several smaller disputes (a map by the CIA)

The Special Representative mechanism on the India–China boundary question (SR/SRM) was constituted in 2003 to "explore from the political perspective of the overall bilateral relationship the framework of a boundary settlement". Atal Bihari Vajpayee, in the capacity of Minister of External Affairs of India, had first suggested the SR mechanism during his visit to China in 1979. During another visit to China by Vajpayee, this time in the capacity of Prime Minister, in June 2003, the mechanism was mentioned in an agreement between the two countries. The latest mention of the SR mechanism was in a joint press statement between India and China on 10 September 2020.

During the 4th round of talks in 2004, Dai Bingguo suggested that the SR mechanism follow a 3 step formula for the settlement of the India–China boundary question:

1. Establish the political parameters and guiding principles
2. Establish the framework for a final package settlement
3. Delineate and demarcate the boundary

The first step was completed with the Agreement on the Political Parameters and Guiding Principles for the Settlement of the India–China Boundary Question being signed in 2005. The second phase of negotiations began with the sixth round of talks.

During the 15th round of the SR talks in 2012, the Working Mechanism for Consultation and Coordination was set up.

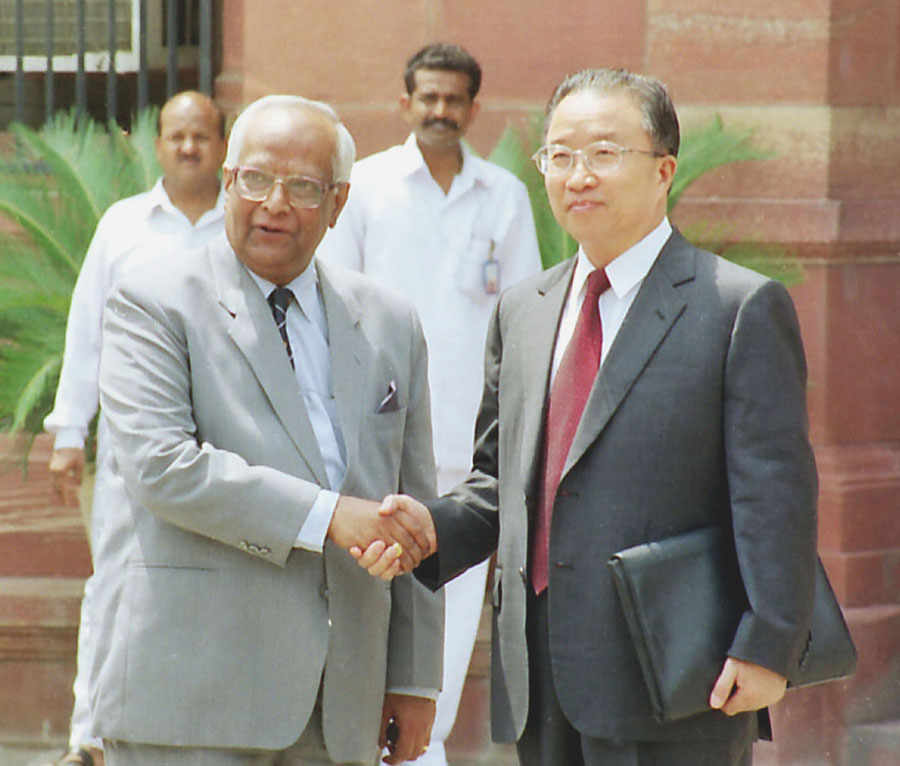
SRs Dai Bingguo and J. N. Dixit in 2004, 3rd round of talks

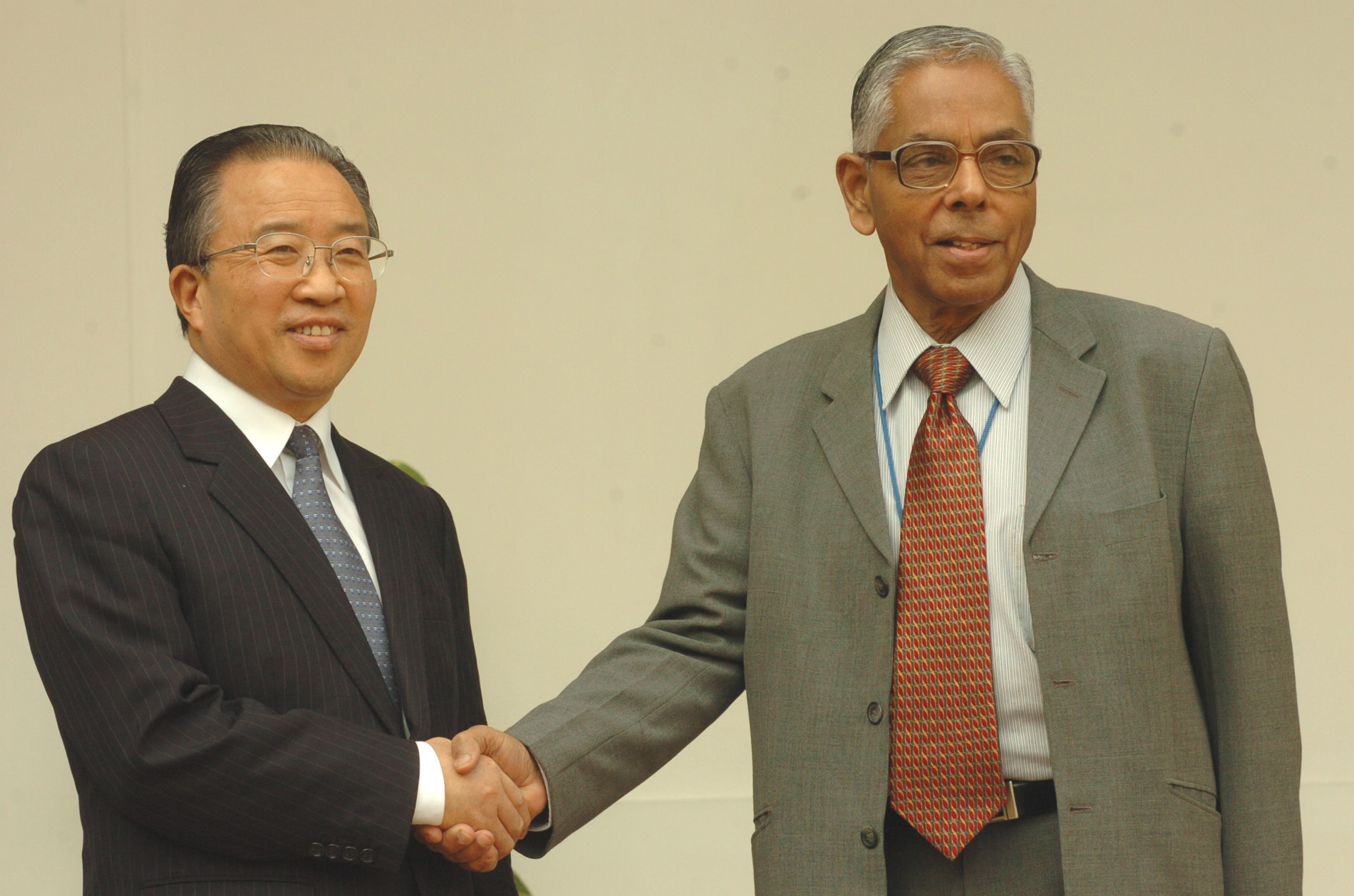
SRs Dai Bingguo and M. K. Narayanan in 2006, 7th round of talks

== Rounds of talks ==
1. 23–24 October 2003
2. 12–13 January 2004
3. 28 July 2004
4. 18–19 November 2004
5. 10–11 April 2005
6. 24–28 September 2005
7. 11–14 March 2006
8. 24–28 June 2006
9. 17–18 January 2007
10. 20–22 April 2007
11. September 2007
12. September 2008
13. 7–8 August 2009
14. 29–30 November 2010
15. 16–17 January 2012
16. 28–29 June 2013
17. 10–11 February 2014
18. 23 March 2015
19. 20–21 April 2016
20. 22 December 2017
21. 24 November 2018
22. 21 December 2019
23. 18 December 2024
24. 19 August 2025

== List of Special Representatives ==
=== China ===
No.	Image	Name	Period
1		Dai Bingguo	from 2003
2		Yang Jiechi	from 2013
3		Wang Yi	from April 2018

=== India ===
No.	Image	Name	Period
1		Brijesh Mishra	from June 2003
2		Jyotindra Nath Dixit	from June 2004
3		M. K. Narayanan	from January 2005
4		Shivshankar Menon	from January 2010
5		Ajit Doval	from May 2014

== Commentary ==
A former ambassador of India, Sourabh Kumar, questioned the three step approach, saying that it could be approached in a reverse manner.

Sinologist B. R. Deepak says that within three years, the SR mechanism, along with other CBMs, were redundant and consistently violated.
