= India–China Joint Working Group on the Boundary Question =

Bilateral administrative mechanism between India and China

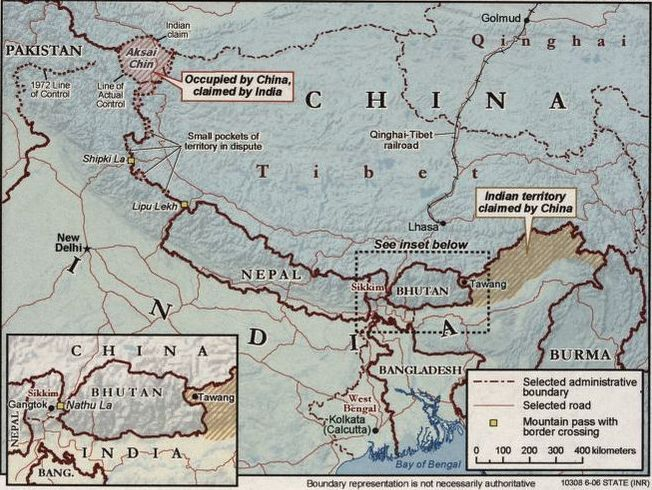
The China–India border, showing two large disputed areas in Aksai Chin and Arunachal Pradesh and several smaller disputes (a map by the CIA)

The Joint Working Group (JWG) was the first official bilateral administrative mechanism formed after the 1962 Sino-Indian War by India and China to discuss the boundary question with the aim of finding a solution. It was officially announced in a joint press communique in Beijing on 23 December 1988. A total of fifteen meetings of the JWG were held between 1989 and 2005. The last meeting was held on 30–31 March 2005.

While the JWG was not able to resolve the boundary question, it was an important bilateral mechanism through which India and China gradually resolved certain aspects of the border problem. A "hotline" was set up between military commanders, border posts were opened, mechanisms for conveying troop positions were just some of the incremental changes accomplished.

== Background ==
The relevant part of the joint press communique reads:

The leaders of the two countries held [...] discussions on the Sino-Indian boundary question [...] They also agreed to develop their relations actively in other fields and work hard to create a favourable climate and conditions for a fair and reasonable settlement of the boundary question while seeking a mutually acceptable solution to this question. In this context, concrete steps will be taken, such as establishing a joint working group on the boundary question and a joint group on economic relations and trade and science and technology.

The JWG would be led by the Indian foreign secretary and the Chinese deputy foreign minister. The JWG had a three-point mandate, summarised as, make recommendations and maintain border peace pending a final solution utilising the expertise of military experts, communications experts, legal experts etc.

== Rounds ==
1. 30 June – 4 July 1989
2. 30–31 August 1990
3. 12–14 May 1991
4. 20–21 February 1992
5. 27–29 October 1992
6. 24–27 June 1993
7. 6–7 July 1994
8. 18–20 August 1995
9. 16–18 October 1996
10. 4–5 August 1997
11. 26–27 April 1999
12. 28–29 April 2000
13. 31 July – 1 August 2001
14. 21–22 November 2002
15. 30–31 March 2005

== See also ==
- India–China border agreements
  - 1988: Joint press communique, 23 December
  - Confidence building measures
    - 1993: Border Peace and Tranquility Agreement
    - 1996: Agreement on Military Confidence Building Measures
    - 2005: Protocol for the Implementation of Military Confidence Building Measures
  - Political measures
    - 2003: Declaration on Principles for Relations and Comprehensive Cooperation
    - 2005: Agreement on the Political Parameters and Guiding Principles for the Settlement of the India–China Boundary Question
  - 2012: Agreement on the Establishment of a Working Mechanism for Consultation and Coordination on India–China Border Affairs
  - 2013: Border Defence Cooperation Agreement
  - 2020: 5 point statement
