= Working Mechanism for Consultation and Coordination on India–China Border Affairs =

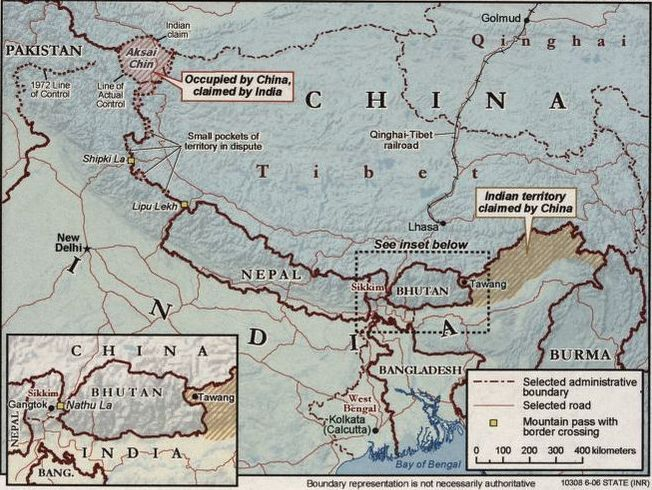
The China–India border, showing two large disputed areas in Aksai Chin and Arunachal Pradesh and several smaller disputes (a map by the CIA)

The Working Mechanism for Consultation and Coordination on India–China Border Affairs (WMCC) was set up through an India–China agreement in January 2012 for improved institutionalised information exchange on border related issues. The mechanism was first suggested by Wen Jiabao in 2010. It was finalised at the 15th round of Special Representative talks in January 2012.

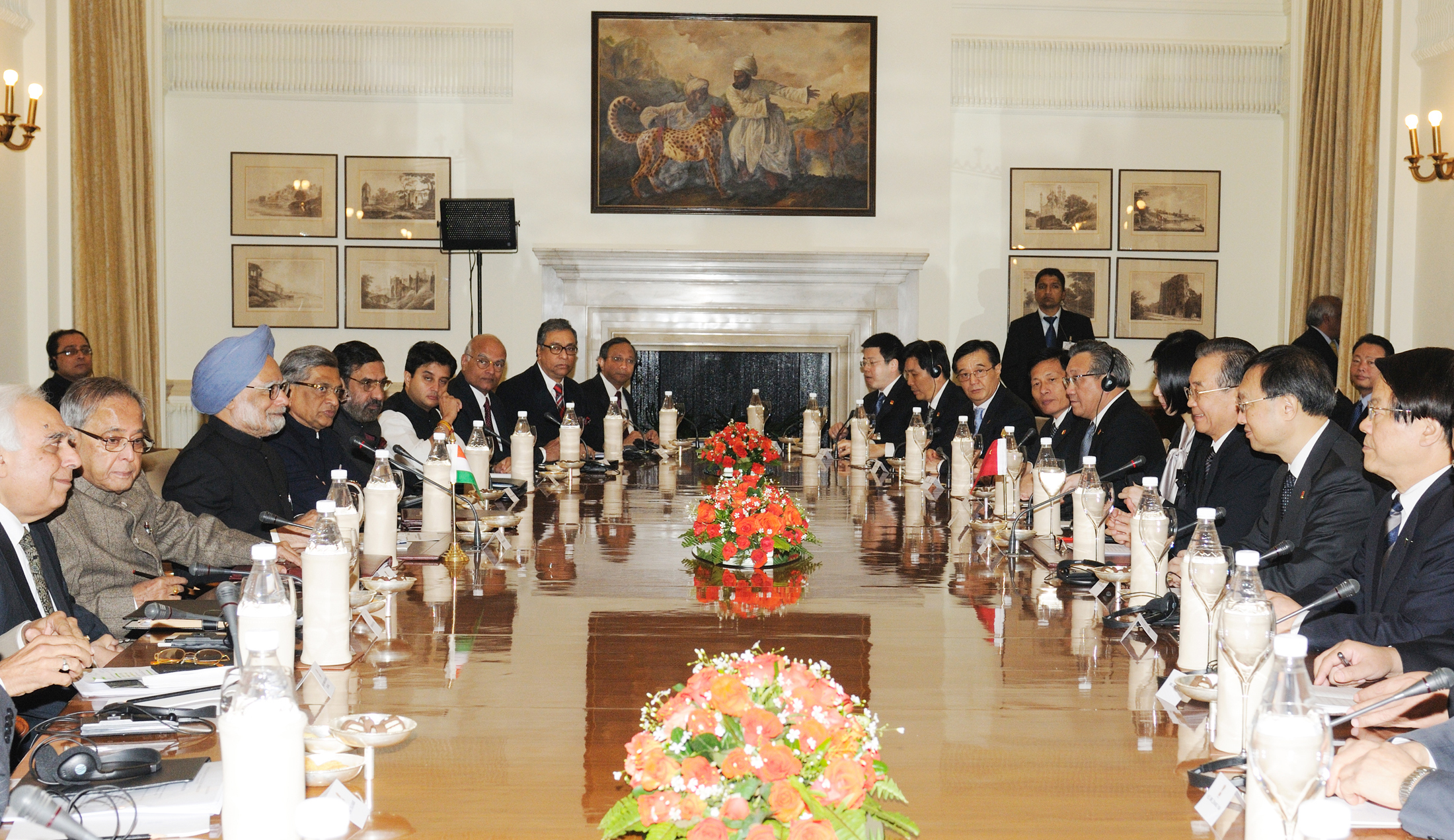
Chinese Premier Wen Jiabao and Indian PM Manmohan Singh at delegation level talks in New Delhi on 16 December 2010.

On 16 December 2010, Chinese Premier Wen Jiabao said at the Indian Council of World Affairs,

During my visit, the two sides have agreed to set up a working mechanism for consultation and coordination on border affairs [...] This (mechanism) will help enhance our mutual trust and maintain peace and tranquility in the border areas [...] It (boundary issue) requires patience and will take a fairly long period of time [...] the most important thing to do is to press ahead along the right track, narrow differences step by step, build consensus and increase confidence

According to the agreement, the mechanism is led by a "Joint Secretary level official from the Ministry of External Affairs of the Republic of India and a Director General level official from the Ministry of Foreign Affairs of the People's Republic of China and will be composed of diplomatic and military officials". The working mechanism will "not discuss resolution of the Boundary Question or affect the Special Representatives Mechanism".

== Rounds ==
1. 6 March 2012
2. 29–30 November 2012
3. 23–24 July 2013
4. 29–30 September 2013
5. 10 February 2014
6. 28–30 April 2014
7. 27 August 2014
8. 16–17 October 2014
9. —
10. 17 November 2017
11. 22 March 2018
12. 27 September 2018
13. 29 January 2019
14. 29 July 2019
15. 24 June 2020 (virtual)
16. 10 July 2020
17. 24 July 2020
18. 20 August 2020
19. 30 September 2020
20. 18 December 2020
21. —
22. 25 June 2021

== See also ==
- India–China border agreements
  - 1988: India–China Joint Working Group on the boundary question
  - Confidence building measures
    - 1993: Border Peace and Tranquility Agreement
    - 1996: Agreement on Military Confidence Building Measures
    - 2005: Protocol for the Implementation of Military Confidence Building Measures
  - Political measures
    - 2003: Declaration on Principles for Relations and Comprehensive Cooperation
    - 2005: Agreement on the Political Parameters and Guiding Principles for the Settlement of the India–China Boundary Question
  - 2012: Agreement on the Establishment of a Working Mechanism for Consultation and Coordination on India–China Border Affairs
  - 2013: Border Defence Cooperation Agreement
  - 2020: 5 point statement
