= China–India relations =

Bilateral relations

- China: India

Diplomatic mission
- Embassy of China, New Delhi: Embassy of India, Beijing

Envoy
- China Ambassador to India Xu Feihong: India Ambassador to China Vikram Doraiswami

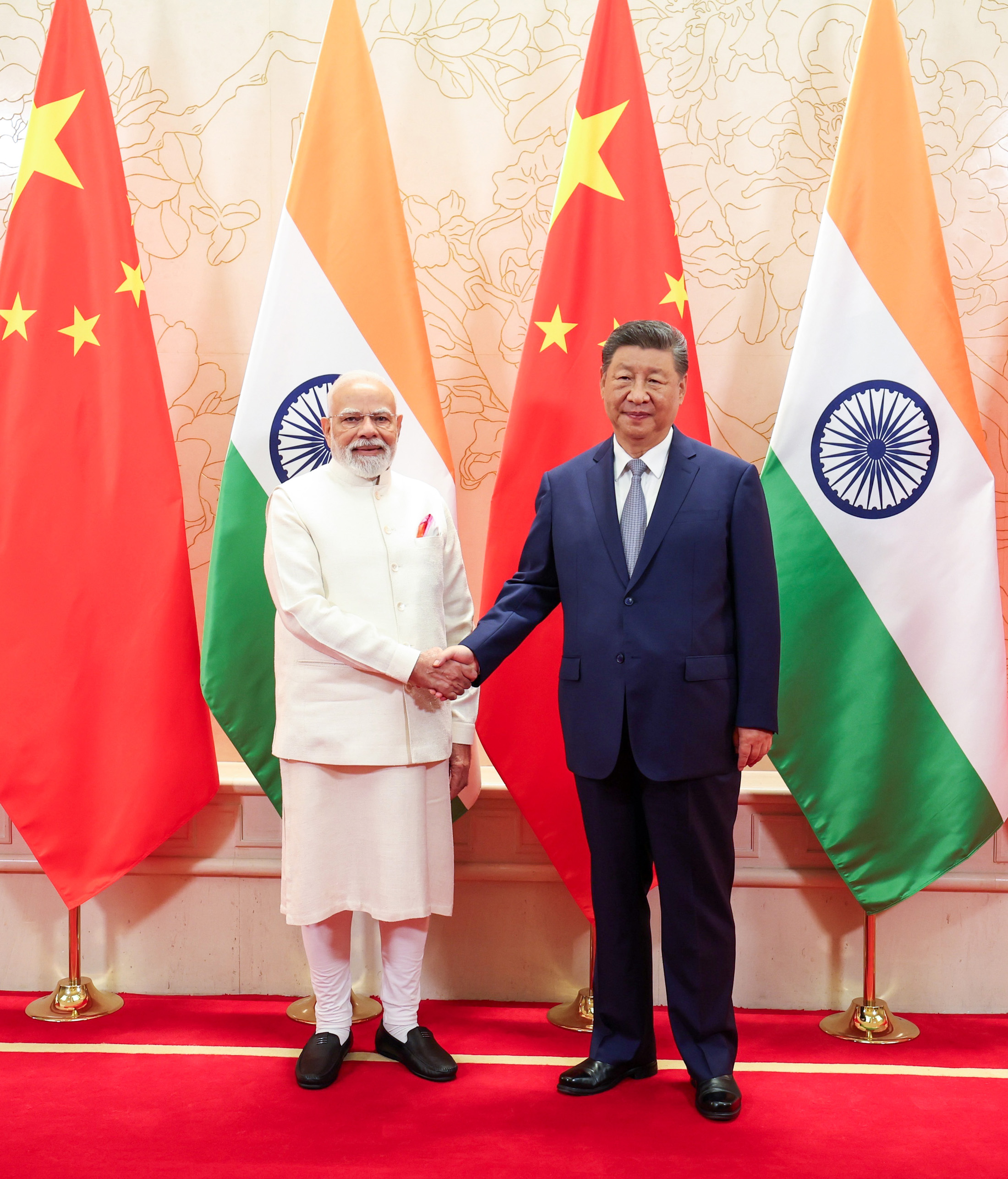
The Prime Minister of India, Narendra Modi meeting the Chinese leader, Xi Jinping, in Wuhan, China during a Shanghai Cooperation Organisation summit on 31 August 2025

China and India maintained peaceful relations for thousands of years, but their relationship has varied since the Chinese Communist Party (CCP)'s victory in the Chinese Civil War in 1949. The two nations have sought economic cooperation with each other, while frequent border disputes and economic nationalism in both countries are major points of contention.

Cultural and economic relations between China and India date back to ancient times. The Silk Road not only served as a major trade route between India and China, but is also credited for facilitating the spread of Buddhism from India to East Asia. During the 19th century, the British East India Company increasingly exported opium, grown in India, leading to the Opium Wars. During World War II, both British India and the Republic of China (ROC) played a crucial role in halting the progress of Imperial Japan. After India became independent in 1947, it established relations with the ROC. The modern Sino-Indian diplomatic relationship began in 1950, when India was among the first noncommunist countries to end formal relations with the Republic of China and recognise the PRC as the legitimate government of both Mainland China and Taiwan. China and India are two of the major regional powers in Asia, and are the two most populous countries and among the fastest growing major economies in the world.

Growth in diplomatic and economic influence has increased the significance of their bilateral relationship. Between 2008 and 2021, China was India's largest trading partner, and the two countries have extended their strategic and military relations. India has a large trade deficit that is favoured towards China. The Sino-Indian border dispute, manifested by the Line of Actual Control (LAC), remains a central issue, resulting in the 1962 Sino-Indian War, the clashes in 1967, and then a standoff in 1987. Since the late 1980s, both countries have rebuilt diplomatic and economic ties; a 1996 agreement forbids firearms and explosives near the LAC.

Border deconfliction mechanisms emerged, beginning with the 2003 Special Representatives. Renewed conflicts included standoffs in 2013, and in 2017; major skirmishes in 2020-2021 resulted in dozens of deaths on both sides; military infrastructure near the LAC continues to grow. India's concerns include China's close relations with Pakistan, and with separatist groups in Northeast India. China's concerns include Indian military and economic activities in the disputed South China Sea and hosting of Tibetan exiles. Today, South Asia is the primary site of great power competition between China and India.

== Geopolitical overview ==
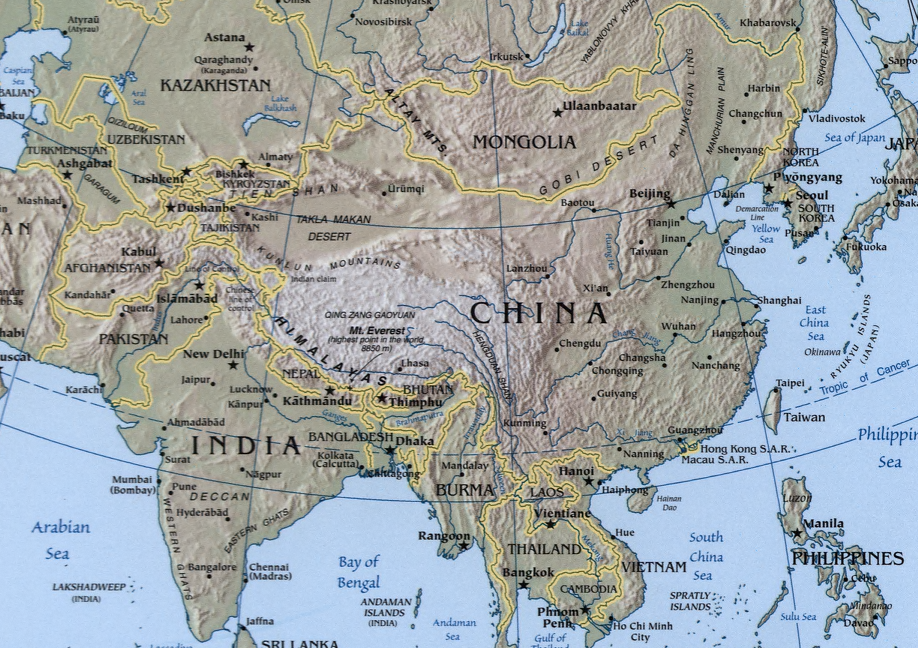
Eastern and Southern Asia. (The border between the People's Republic of China and India over Arunachal Pradesh/South Tibet reflects actual control, without a dotted line showing claims.)

The China–India border straddles the Himalayas, with Nepal and Bhutan acting as buffer states. Parts of the disputed Kashmir region claimed by India (J&K and Ladakh) are claimed and administered by either Pakistan (Azad Kashmir and Gilgit Baltistan) or by the PRC (Aksai Chin). The Government of Pakistan, on its maps, shows the Aksai Chin area as mostly within China and labels the boundary "Frontier Undefined", while India holds that Aksai Chin is illegally occupied by the PRC. China and India also dispute most of Arunachal Pradesh.

Not only is China's India policy shaped by greater competition with the United States, but there are also real structural issues in India-China relations that exacerbate discord. These stem largely from China's attempts to keep India at arm's length in the Indo-Pacific region. There are clear differences in the regional order in Asia that the two countries desire—India seeks a multipolar order, of which India is one of the main poles, while China seeks a single pole, of which India is not a pole at all.

As India strengthens its security ties with the United States and takes a leading role in organizing the Global South, tensions with China persist. China's engagement with India's neighbors and growing military cooperation with Pakistan further strain India's geopolitical landscape. In this volatile landscape, Sino-Indian relations seek a delicate balance between pragmatic economic interests and escalating geopolitical tensions.

== History ==
=== Antiquity ===
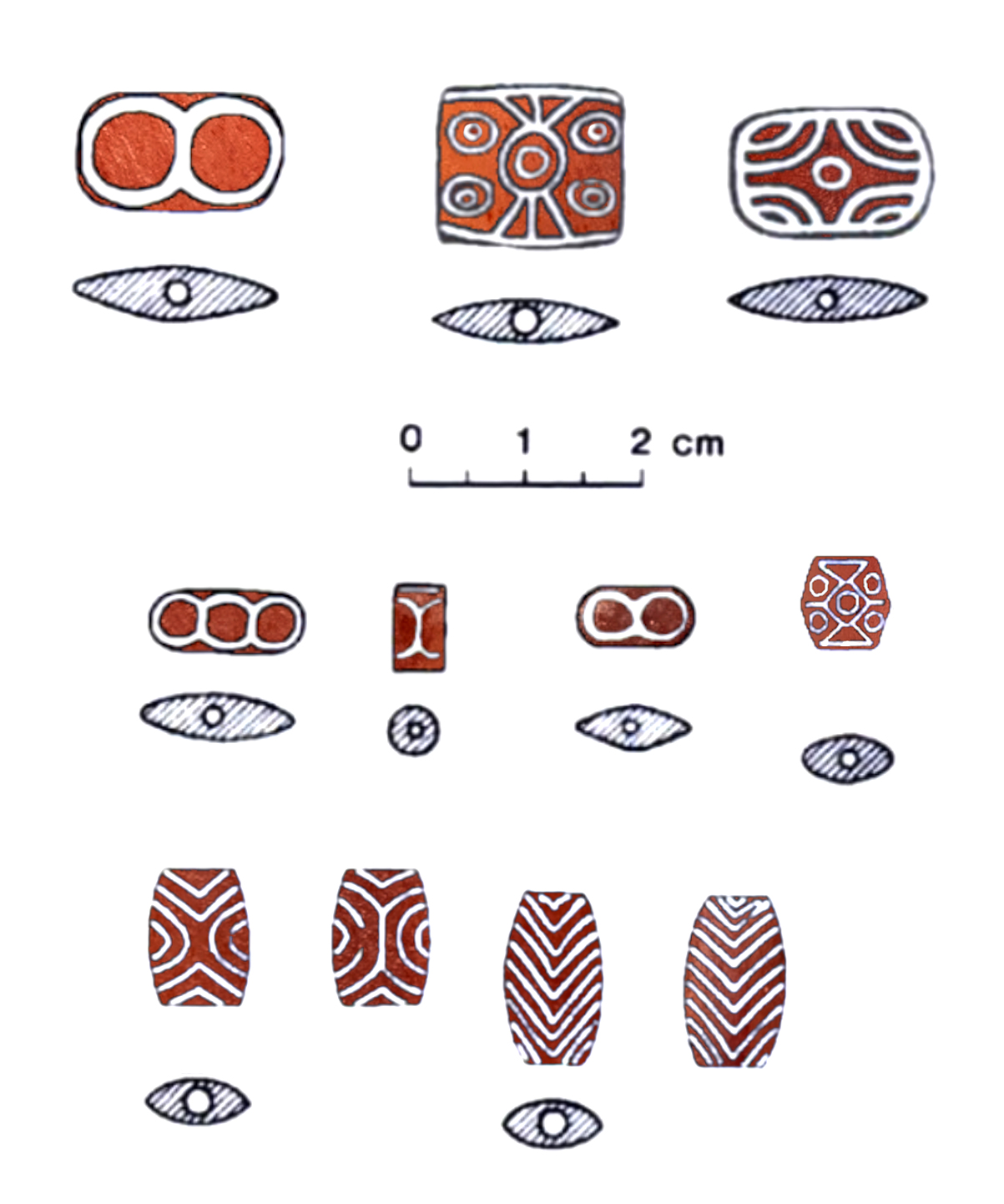
Etched carnelian beads, Harappa Culture. Such beads were imported from India to China in the early half of 1st millennium BCE.

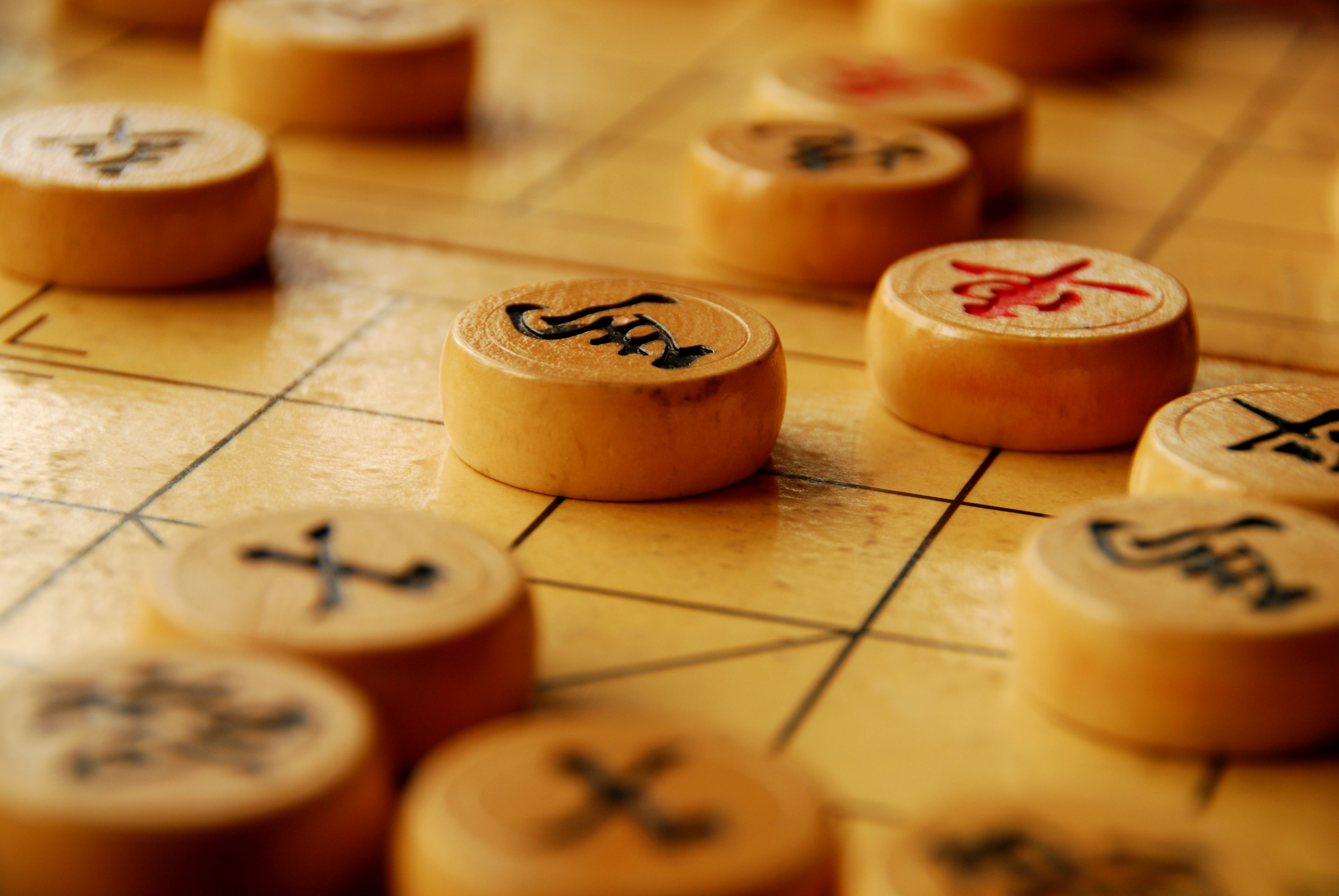
Xiangqi, or Chinese chess, which, like Western Chess is believed to be descended from the Indian chess game of chaturanga. The earliest indications reveal the game may have been played as early as the third century BCE.

China and India have also had some contact before the transmission of Buddhism. References to a people called the Chinas are found in ancient Indian literature. The Indian epic Mahabharata (c. 5th century BCE) contains references to "China", which may have been referring to the Qin state which later became the Qin dynasty. Chanakya (c. 350–283 BCE), the prime minister of the Maurya Empire, refers to Chinese silk as "cinamsuka" (Chinese silk dress) and "cinapatta" (Chinese silk bundle) in his Arthashastra.

Buddhism was transmitted from India to China in the 1st century CE. Trade relations via the Silk Road acted as economic contact between the two regions.

=== Middle Ages ===
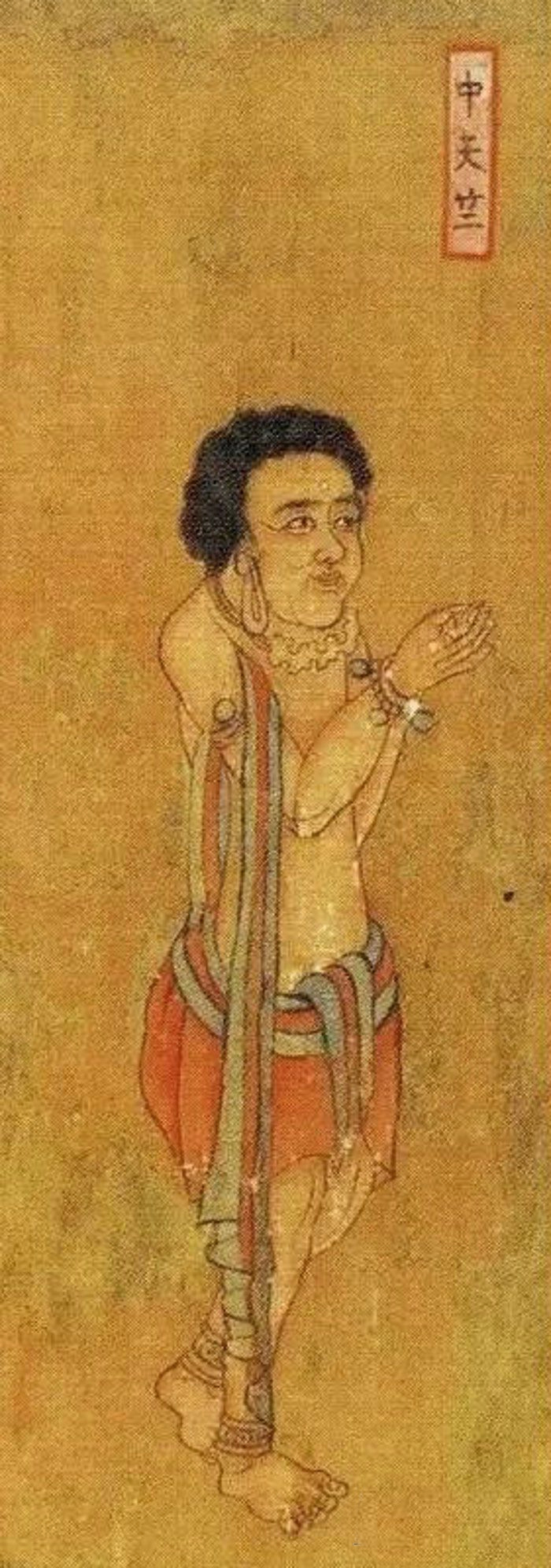
Ambassador from Central India (中天竺 Zhong Tianzhu) to the court of the Tang dynasty. Wanghuitu (王会图) circa 650 CE.

From the 1st century onwards, many Indian scholars and monks traveled to China, such as Batuo (fl. 464–495 CE)—first abbot of the Shaolin Monastery—and Bodhidharma—founder of Chan/Zen Buddhism—while many Chinese scholars and monks also traveled to India, such as Xuanzang (b. 604) and I Ching (635–713), both of whom were students at Nalanda University in Bihar.

==== Tang and Harsha dynasties ====
During the 7th century, Tang dynasty China gained control over large portions of the Silk Road and Central Asia. In 649, the Chinese general Wang Xuance, along with thousands of recruited Tibetan and Nepalese troops, briefly invaded North India and won the Battle of Chabuheluo.

During the 8th century, the astronomical table of sines by the Indian astronomer and mathematician, Aryabhatta (476–550), were translated into the Chinese astronomical and mathematical book of the Treatise on Astrology of the Kaiyuan Era (Kaiyuan Zhanjing), compiled in 718 CE during the Tang dynasty. The Kaiyuan Zhanjing was compiled by Gautama Siddha, an astronomer and astrologer born in Chang'an, and whose family was originally from India. He was also notable for his translation of the Navagraha calendar into Chinese.

==== Yuan dynasty ====
Tamil Hindu Indian merchants traded in Quanzhou during the Yuan dynasty. Hindu statues were found in Quanzhou dating to this period.

According to Badauni and Ferishta, the Delhi Sultanate under Muhammad bin Tughluq had ambitions to invade China. There existed a direct trade relationship between China and the Delhi Sultanate. Ibn Battuta mentions that the Yuan Emperor had sent an embassy to Muhammad to reconstruct a sacked temple at Sambhal.

=== Ming dynasty ===
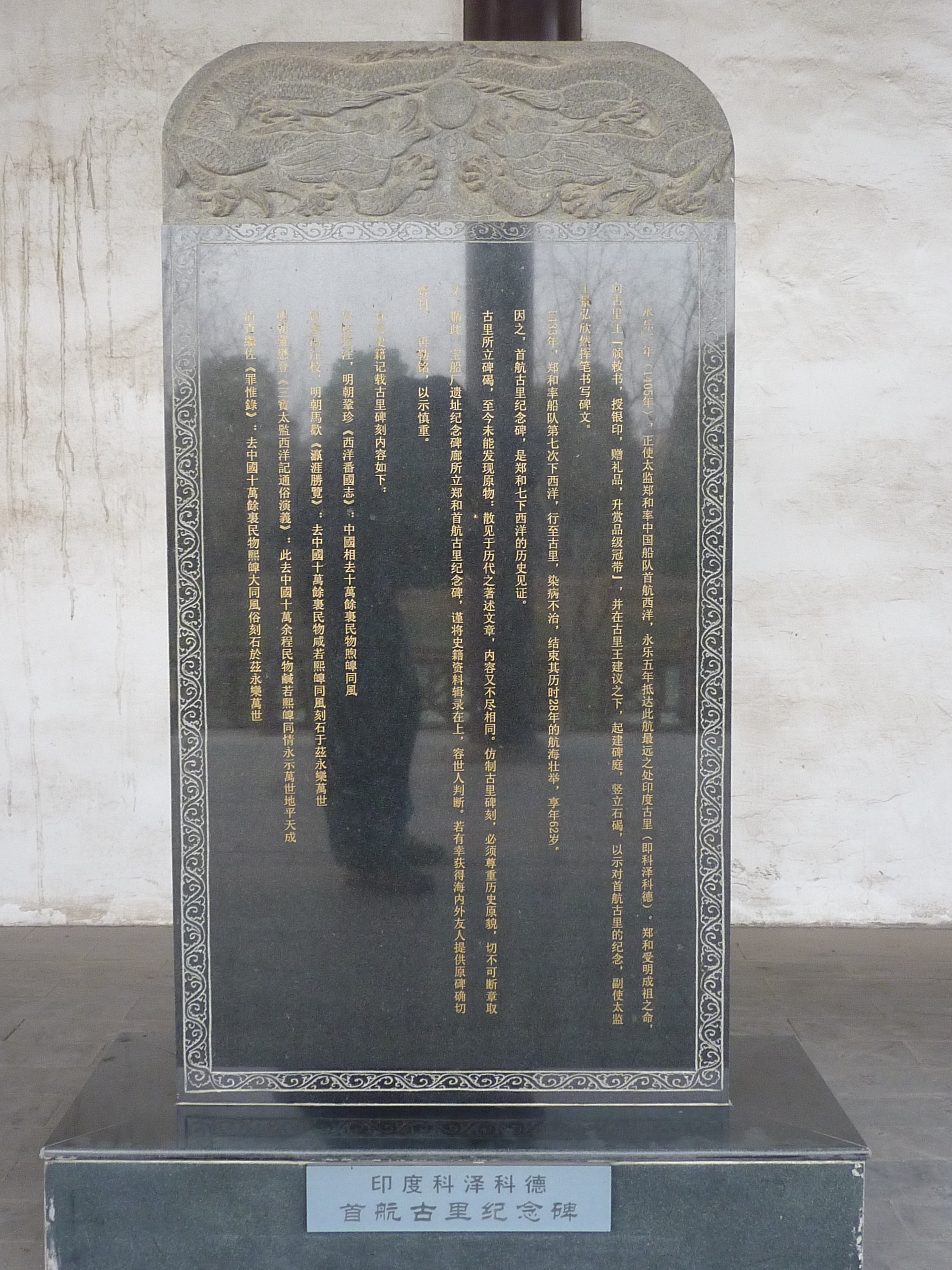
Stele installed in Calicut by Zheng He (modern replica)

Between 1405 and 1433, Ming dynasty China sponsored a series of seven naval expeditions led by Admiral Zheng He. Zheng He visited numerous Indian kingdoms and ports, including the Malabar coast, Bengal, and Ceylon, the Persian Gulf, Arabia, and later expeditions ventured down as far as Malindi in what is now Kenya. Throughout his travels, Zheng He liberally dispensed Chinese gifts of silk, porcelain, and other goods. In return, he received rich and unusual presents, including African zebras and giraffes. After the Ming treasure voyages, private Chinese traders continued operating in the eastern Indian Ocean. Chinese junks could frequently be seen in the ports of the Vijayanagara Empire, carrying silks and other products.

=== Qing dynasty ===
The Bhois of Orissa maintained minor maritime trade links with China. Many of the gosains entering Tibet from China passed through the territory of Birakisore Deva I of Khurda (1736–1793) who styled himself as Gajapati, the ruler of Utkala, when visiting the Jagannath temple at Puri.

The reign of Tipu Sultan in Mysore saw Chinese technology used for sugar production, and sandalwood was exported to China. Tipu's and Mysore's tryst with silk began in the early 1780s when he received a silk cloth from an ambassador from the Qing dynasty-ruled China at his court. Tipu was said to be enchanted by the item to such an extent that he resolved to introduce its production in his kingdom. He sent a return journey to China, which returned after twelve years.

After the Qing expansion into the Himalayas, there was increased contact with South Asia, which often manifested in the form of tributary relations. The Qing were obliged to defend their subservient state, Badakhshan, against the Afghans and Marathas, though no major clash with the Marathas ever took place. The Afghans gained the initiative and defeated the Marathas at Panipat in 1761. The battle's outcome was used by the Afghans to intimidate the Qing.

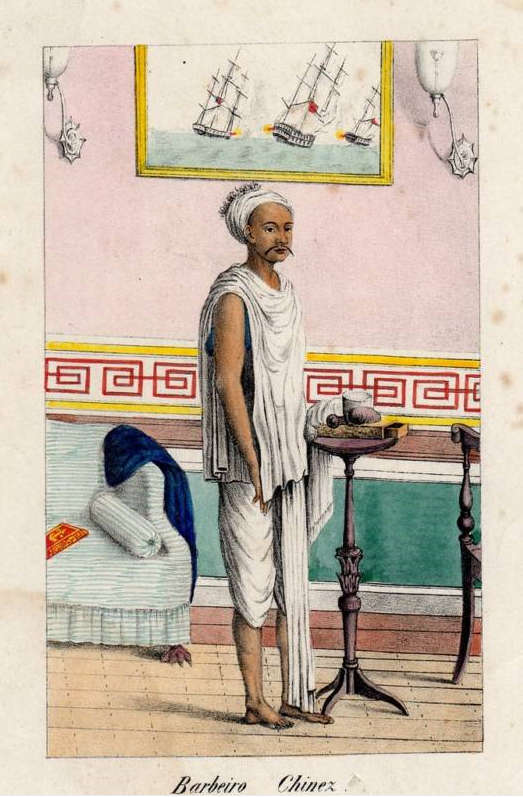
A Chinese barber in Goa, early 1800s

==== Sino-Sikh War ====
In the 18th to 19th centuries, the Sikh Empire expanded into neighbouring lands. It annexed Ladakh into the state of Jammu in 1834. In 1841, they had some conflicts with Chinese forces; neither side wished to continue the conflict, as the Sikhs were embroiled in tensions with the British that would lead up to the First Anglo-Sikh War, while the Chinese were in the midst of the First Opium War. The Sikhs claimed victory. The two parties signed a treaty in September 1842, which stipulated no transgressions or interference in the other country's frontiers.

==== British Raj ====
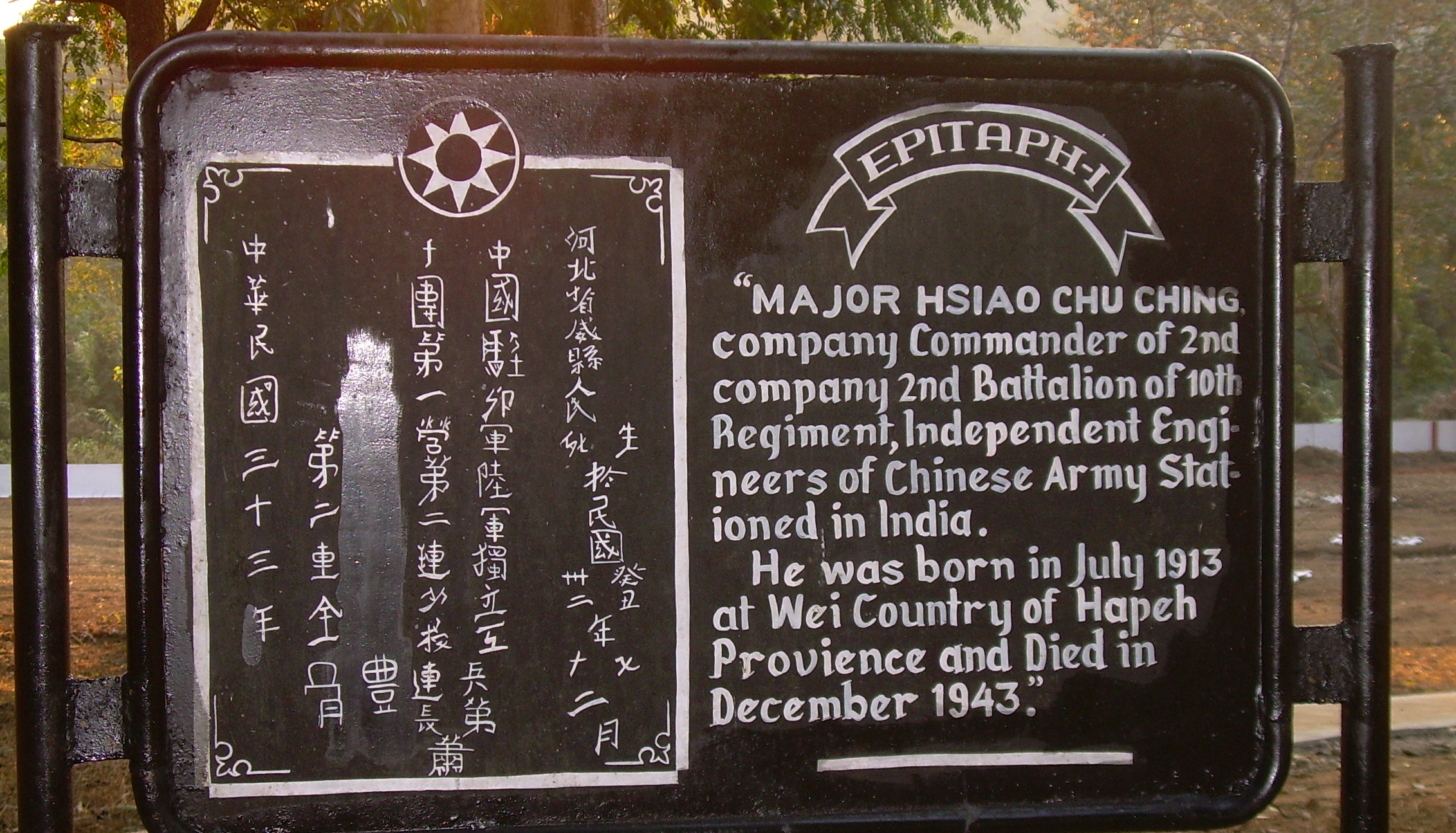
Epitaph of Major Hsiao Chu Ching at Jairampur cemetery

Indian soldiers, known as "sepoys", who were in British service participated in the First and Second Opium Wars against Qing China. Indian sepoys were also involved in the suppression of the Boxer Rebellion in 1900, in addition to serving as guards in the British colony of Hong Kong and foreign concessions such as the Shanghai International Settlement. The Chinese slur "Yindu A San " (印度阿三 - Indian number three) was used to describe Indian soldiers in British service, with some of the popular sentiment rejecting the possibility for Sino-Indian fraternity.

=== Republic of China ===
In 1924, on his major tour of several major Chinese cities, giving lectures about using their shared Asian values and traditional spirituality to help together promote world peace, Rabindranath Tagore was invited to Canton by Sun Yat-sen, an invitation which he declined. There was a considerably mixed reception to Tagore from the Chinese students and intellectuals.

China–India relations
- China: India

Hu Shih, the Chinese ambassador to the United States from 1938 to 1942, commented, albeit critically, on India's Buddhism almost completely subsuming Chinese society upon its introduction.

ASIA is one. The Himalayas divide, only to accentuate, two mighty civilizations, the Chinese with its communism of Confucius, and the Indian with its individualism of the Vedas. But not even the snowy barriers can interrupt for one moment that broad expanse of love for the Ultimate and Universal, which is the common thought-inheritance of every Asiatic race, enabling them to produce all the great religions of the world and distinguishing them from those maritime peoples of the Mediterranean and the Baltic, who love to dwell on the Particular, and to search out the means, not the end, of life.

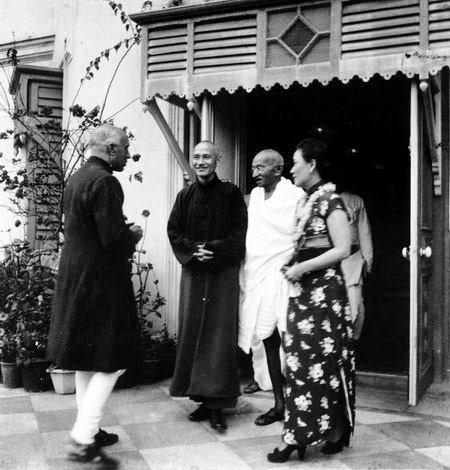
Chiang Kai-shek and his wife Song Meiling with Mahatma Gandhi and Jawaharlal Nehru

While never having actually visited India in his lifetime, Sun Yat-sen, founder of the Republic of China, occasionally spoke and wrote of India as a fellow Asian nation that was likewise subject to harsh Western exploitation, and frequently called for a Pan-Asian united front against all unjust imperialism. Similarly, believing that then-Republican China and British India were "sister nations from the dawn of history" who needed to transform their "ancient friendship into a new camaraderie of two freedom-loving nations", Jawaharlal Nehru visited China in 1939 as an honored guest of the government. Highly praising both Chiang Kai-shek and his wife Song Meiling, Nehru referred to Chiang as "not only a great Chinese, but a great Asiatic and world figure...one of the top most leaders of the world...a successful general and captain in war", and Song as "full of vitality and charm...a star hope for the Chinese people...a symbol of China's invincibility". Chiang recorded a favorable impression of Nehru in his diary, and the Chiangs also regularly wrote Nehru during his time in prison and even after their 1942 visit to India.

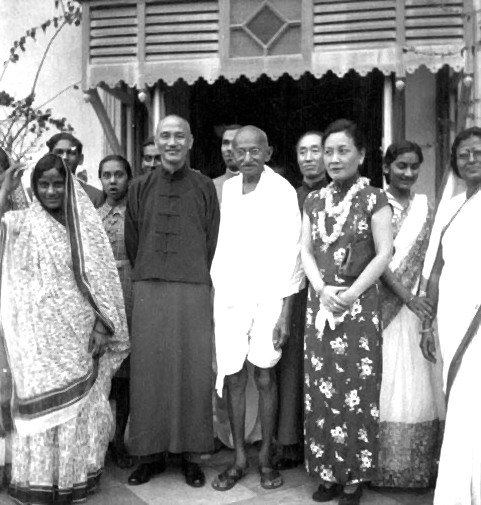
The Chiangs with Mahatma Gandhi in Calcutta in 1942

Partially to enlist India's aid against both Japanese and Western imperialism in exchange for China's support for Indian independence, the Chiangs visited British India in 1942 and met with Nehru, Mahatma Gandhi, and Muhammad Ali Jinnah. The Chiangs also sought to present their nation as a potential third option for the Indian people to ally themselves with, with public sympathies at the time sharply split between the British and the Japanese, who actively tried to sway India's population with pledges to liberate Asia if they would help their efforts against the British. While the public reception to the Chiangs was mostly positive, some reacted less favorably to the Chiangs' presence in India, with Jinnah believing that Chiang Kai-shek lacked proper understanding of Indian society and feeling he was biased in favor of Nehru and Gandhi while neglecting the demands of other religious communities. For his part, Chiang apparently believed none of the major Indian leaders could help his government meaningfully. Nevertheless, the Chiangs continued to commit themselves to supporting the Indian independence movement from afar, mostly via diplomacy, with Song Meiling writing to Nehru encouragingly: "We shall leave nothing undone in assisting you to gain freedom and independence."

In 1942, a division of the Kuomintang's armies entered India as the Chinese Army in India in their struggle against Japanese expansion in Southeast Asia.

== Post independence ==
On 15 August 1947, India gained independence from the United Kingdom. The newly independent India established diplomatic relations with the ROC. On 1 October 1949, the Chinese People's Liberation Army defeated the Kuomintang (the ROC's ruling Nationalist Party) and took over Mainland China, establishing the PRC. Soon afterwards, India became a federal, democratic republic after its constitution came into effect on 26 January 1950.

=== 1950s ===
Their last telegrame to us is an act of gross discourtesy [...] It looks as though it is not a friend speaking in that language but a potential enemy [...] for the first time, after centuries, India’s defence has to concentrate itself on two fronts simultaneously. [...] In our calculations we shall now have to reckon with communist China in the north and in the north-east, a communist China which has definite ambitions and aims and which does not, in any way, seem friendly disposed towards us.

— Excerpt from Home Minister Sardar Patel's letter to Prime Minister Jawaharlal Nehru, November 7, 1950

India established diplomatic relations with the PRC on 1 April 1950, the first non-communist/socialist nation in Asia to do so. Pakistan continued to recognize the ROC until 1951.

The relationship between India and a newly communist China started on an optimistic note. Jawaharlal Nehru, the first prime minister of India, and PRC premier Zhou Enlai articulated a vision of an internationalist foreign policy governed by the ethics of the Panchsheel (Five Principles of Peaceful Coexistence). However, there was notable skepticism on the Indian side from the very beginning about Chinese intentions. For example, Bhimrao Ambedkar was surprised that Nehru took Panchsheel seriously, while Acharya Kriplani said that Panchsheel was "born in sin". Nehru himself was disappointed when it became clear that the two countries had a conflict of interest in Tibet, which had traditionally served as a buffer zone. From the Chinese side, strategists were concerned about the possibility of India continuing to spread its dominance in Asia and the Indian Ocean in the manner of British India.

China viewed Tibet as a part of its territory. The preceding government of the Republic of China under Chiang Kai-shek also claimed Tibet as Chinese territory. However, he was unable to reassert control. Chairman of the Chinese Communist Party Mao Zedong saw Indian concern over Tibet as a manifestation of interference in the internal affairs of the PRC. The PRC reasserted control over Tibet and to end Tibetan Buddhism and feudalism, which it did by force of arms in 1950. To avoid antagonizing the PRC, Nehru informed Chinese leaders that India had no political ambitions or territorial ambitions and did not seek special privileges in Tibet, but that traditional trading rights must continue. With Indian support, Tibetan delegates signed an agreement in May 1951 recognizing PRC sovereignty but guaranteeing that the existing political and social system of Tibet would continue.

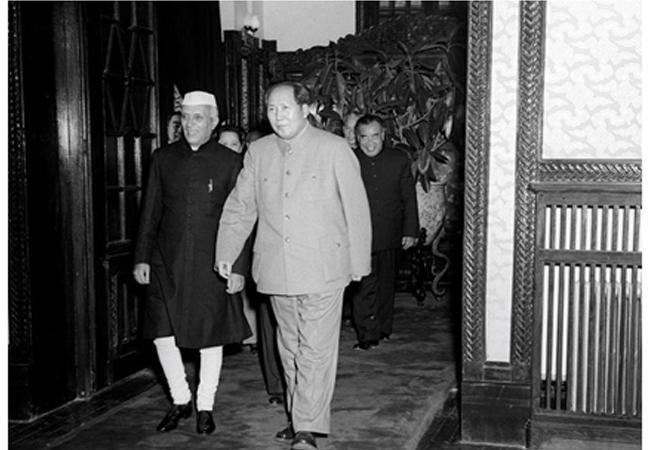
Chairman Mao Zedong of the Chinese Communist Party and Prime Minister Jawaharlal Nehru. In April 1954, India and the PRC signed an eight-year agreement on Tibet that became the Five Principles of Peaceful Coexistence (or Panchsheel). Jawaharlal Nehru of India, during the latter's state visit to China, October 1954.

In October 1954, China and India signed an agreement regarding Tibet, whereby India recognised Tibet as part of China, with China accepting the continuance of the previous trade arrangements. Observers noted the agreement heavily favored China.

It is the popular perception that the catchphrase of India's diplomacy with China in the 1950s was Hindi-Chini bhai-bhai, which means, in Hindi, "Indians and Chinese are brothers". Nehru sought to initiate a more direct dialogue between the peoples of China and India in culture and literature. Around then, the Indian artist (painter) Beohar Rammanohar Sinha, who had earlier decorated the pages of the original Constitution of India, was sent to China in 1957 on a Government of India fellowship to establish a direct cross-cultural and inter-civilization bridge. Noted Indian scholar Rahul Sankrityayan and diplomat Natwar Singh were also there, and Sarvapalli Radhakrishnan paid a visit to the PRC.

After signing the 1954 agreement, India published new maps showing defined borders, as it became apprehensive that China might make claims on Indian territory. Two major territorial disputes existed between China and India, which remained dormant until 1959. In the northeast, Indian territory included the Assam Himalayan region up to the McMahon Line, which China did not recognise as a legal boundary. In the western sector, Indian territory inherited from the British Raj included the Aksai Chin plateau, which Chinese maps started showing as Chinese territory in the 1940s, if not earlier. When India discovered that China built a road through the region, border clashes and Indian protests became more frequent. In January 1959, PRC premier Zhou Enlai wrote to Nehru, pointing out that no government in China had accepted as legal the McMahon Line, which the 1914 Simla Convention defined as the eastern section of the border between India and Tibet.

In March 1959, the Dalai Lama, spiritual and temporal head of the Tibet, sought sanctuary in Dharmsala, Himachal Pradesh, where he established the Tibetan government-in-exile. Thousands of Tibetan refugees settled in northwestern India. Relations between India and China deteriorated after India provided the Dalai Lama sanctuary.

=== 1960s ===
Disputed territories of India

Border disputes resulted in a short border war between the People's Republic of China and India on 20 October 1962. The border clash resulted in an overall defeat of India as the PRC pushed the Indian forces to within 48 km of the Assam plains in the northeast. It also occupied strategic points in the Aksai Chin and Demchok regions of Ladakh, before declaring a unilateral ceasefire on 21 November. It claimed that it withdrew to 20 km behind its contended line of control. India disagreed with the claim.

"I don't want to know what happened in the past. All I want to know is who are my commanders, where are the Chinese, how much ammunition have I got…"

— Field Marshal Sam Manekshaw recalling 1962 when he was appointed to take charge of NEFA following the resignation of Kaul and Menon in the aftermath of the China India war.

During the Sino-Indian border conflict, India's Communist Party was accused by the Indian government of being pro-PRC, and many of its political leaders were jailed. Subsequently, the Communist Party of India (CPI) split with the leftist section, forming the Communist Party of India (Marxist) in 1964.

Relations between the PRC and India deteriorated during the rest of the 1960s and the early 1970s, while China–Pakistan relations improved and Sino-Soviet relations worsened. The PRC backed Pakistan in its 1965 war with India, and issued "ultimatums" threatening military action at its own border. The threats only served to damage Pakistan's relations with the western powers. In late 1967, there were two more conflicts between Indian and Chinese forces at their contested border, in Sikkim, known as the Nathu La and Cho La clashes. Both sides suffered heavy casualties, but India came out in a better position than the PRC.

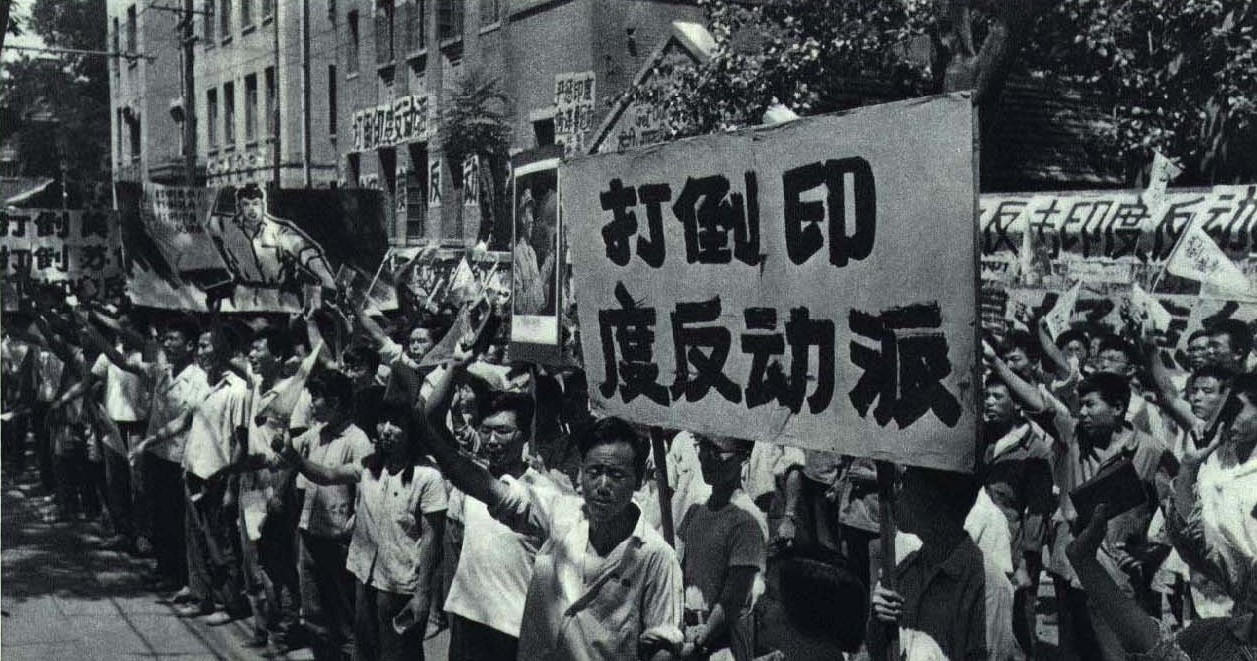
Chinese demonstrations against Indian "reactionary factions" in Beijing in 1967.

The PRC continued an active propaganda campaign against India and supplied ideological, financial, and other assistance to dissident groups, especially to tribes in northeastern India. The PRC accused India of assisting the Khampa rebels in Tibet. Sri Lanka played the role of chief negotiator for the withdrawal of Chinese troops from the Indian territory. Both countries agreed to Colombo's proposals.

=== 1970s ===
In August 1971, India signed a Treaty of Peace, Friendship, and Co-operation with the Soviet Union. The PRC sided with Pakistan in its December 1971 war with India. Although China strongly condemned India, it did not carry out its veiled threat to intervene on Pakistan's behalf. By this time, the PRC had replaced the Republic of China in the UN, where its representatives denounced India as being a "tool of Soviet expansionism."

India and the PRC renewed efforts to improve relations after Indian Prime Minister Indira Gandhi's Congress party lost the 1977 elections to Morarji Desai's Janata Party. In 1978, the Indian Minister of External Affairs Atal Bihari Vajpayee made a landmark visit to Beijing, an impetus to both countries to officially re-establish diplomatic relations in 1979. The PRC modified its pro-Pakistan stand on Kashmir and appeared willing to remain silent on India's absorption of Sikkim and its special advisory relationship with Bhutan. The PRC's leaders agreed to discuss the boundary issue, India's priority, as the first step to a broadening of relations. The two countries hosted each other's news agencies, and Mount Kailash and Mansarowar Lake in Tibet, the home of the Hindu pantheon, were opened to annual pilgrimages.

=== 1980s ===
In 1981, the Minister of Foreign Affairs of the People's Republic of China, Huang Hua, made a landmark visit to New Delhi. PRC Premier Zhao Ziyang concurrently toured Pakistan, Nepal, and Bangladesh.

In 1980, Indian Prime Minister Indira Gandhi approved a plan to upgrade the deployment of forces around the Line of Actual Control. India also undertook infrastructural development in disputed areas. In 1984, squads of Indian soldiers began actively patrolling the Sumdorong Chu Valley in Arunachal Pradesh. In the winter of 1986, the Chinese deployed their troops to the Sumdorong Chu before the Indian team could arrive and built a helipad at Wandung. Surprised by the Chinese occupation, India's then Chief of Army Staff, General K.Sundarji, airlifted a brigade to the region. Chinese troops could not move any further into the valley and were forced to move away from the valley. By 1987, Beijing's reaction was similar to that in 1962 and this prompted many Western diplomats to predict war. However, Indian foreign minister N.D. Tiwari and Prime Minister Rajiv Gandhi travelled to Beijing to negotiate a mutual de-escalation.

India and the PRC held eight rounds of border negotiations between December 1981 and November 1987. In 1985, the PRC insisted on mutual concessions without defining the exact terms of its "package proposal" or where the actual line of control lay. In 1986 and 1987, the negotiations achieved nothing, given the charges exchanged between the two countries of military encroachment in the Sumdorung Chu Valley. China's construction of a military post and helicopter pad in the area in 1986 and India's grant of statehood to Arunachal Pradesh (formerly the North-East Frontier Agency) in February 1987 caused both sides to deploy troops to the area. The PRC relayed warnings that it would "teach India a lesson" if it did not cease "nibbling" at Chinese territory. By the summer of 1987, however, both sides had backed away from conflict and denied that military clashes had taken place.

A warming trend in relations was facilitated by Rajiv Gandhi's visit to China in December 1988. The two sides issued a joint communiqué that stressed the need to restore friendly relations based on Panchsheel. India and the People's Republic of China agreed to achieve a "fair and reasonable settlement while seeking a mutually acceptable solution" to the border dispute. The communiqué also expressed China's concern about agitation by Tibetan separatists in India and reiterated that anti-China political activities by expatriate Tibetans would not be tolerated. Rajiv Gandhi signed bilateral agreements on science and technology co-operation, established direct air links, and on cultural exchanges. The two sides also agreed to hold annual diplomatic consultations between foreign ministers, set up a joint committee on economic and scientific co-operation, and a joint working group on the boundary issue. The latter group was to be led by the Indian foreign secretary and the Chinese vice minister of foreign affairs.

=== 1990s ===
Top-level dialogue continued with the December 1991 visit of PRC premier Li Peng to India and the May 1992 visit to China of Indian president R. Venkataraman. Six rounds of talks of the Indian-Chinese Joint Working Group on the Border Issue were held between December 1988 and June 1993. Progress was also made in reducing tensions on the border via mutual troop reductions, regular meetings of local military commanders, and advance notification about military exercises. In July 1992, Sharad Pawar visited Beijing, the first Indian Minister of Defence to do so. Consulates reopened in Bombay (Mumbai) and Shanghai in December 1992.

In 1993, the sixth round of the joint working group talks was held in New Delhi but resulted in only minor developments. Prime Minister Narasimha Rao and Premier Li Peng signed a border agreement dealing with cross-border trade, cooperation on environmental issues (e.g., pollution, animal extinction, global warming, etc.), and radio and television broadcasting. A senior-level Chinese military delegation made a goodwill visit to India in December 1993 aimed at "fostering confidence-building measures between the defence forces of the two countries." The visit, however, came at a time when China was providing greater military support to Burma. The presence of Chinese radar technicians in Burma's Coco Islands, which border India's Andaman and Nicobar Islands, caused concern in India.

In January 1994, Beijing announced that it not only favored a negotiated solution on Kashmir, but also opposed any form of independence for the region. Talks were held in New Delhi in February aimed at confirming established "confidence-building measures", discussing clarification of the "line of actual control", reduction of armed forces along the line, and prior information about forthcoming military exercises. China's hope for settlement of the boundary issue was reiterated.

In 1995, talks by the India-China Expert Group led to an agreement to set up two additional points of contact along the 4,000 km border to facilitate meetings between military personnel. The two sides were reportedly "seriously engaged" in defining the McMahon Line and the line of actual control vis-à-vis military exercises and prevention of air intrusion. Talks were held in Beijing in July and in New Delhi in August to improve border security, combat cross-border crimes, and on additional troop withdrawals from the border. These talks further reduced tensions.

There was little notice taken in Beijing of the April 1995 announcement of the opening of the Taipei Economic and Cultural Centre in New Delhi. The centre serves as the representative office of the Republic of China (Taiwan) and is the counterpart of the India-Taipei Association located in Taiwan. Both institutions share the goal of improving India-ROC relations, which have been strained since New Delhi's recognition of Beijing in 1950.

China-Indian relations hit a low point in 1998 following India's nuclear tests. Indian Defence Minister George Fernandes declared that "“in my perception of national security, China is enemy No 1....and any person who is concerned about India's security must agree with that fact", hinting that India developed nuclear weapons in defence against China's nuclear arsenal. During the 1999 Kargil War, China voiced support for Pakistan, but also counseled Pakistan to withdraw its forces.

=== 2000s ===
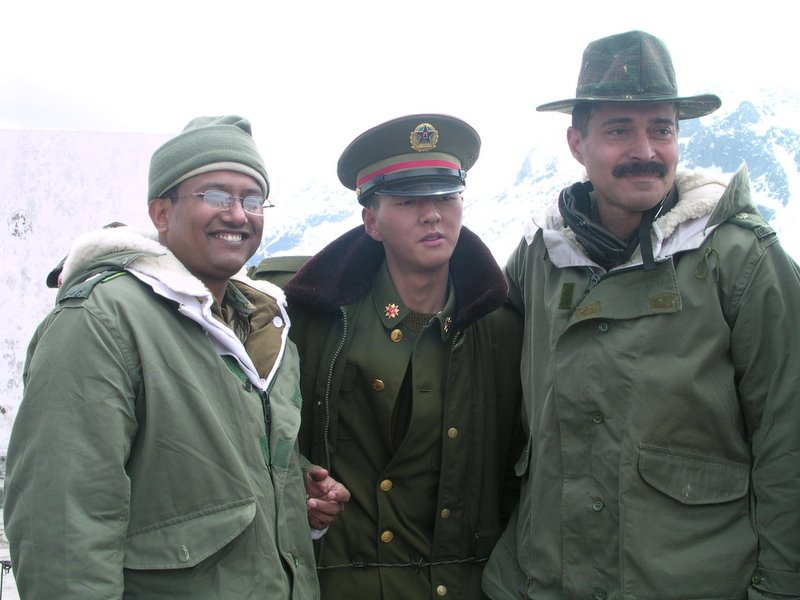
Indian and Chinese officers at Nathu La. Nathu La was reopened in 2006 following numerous bilateral trade agreements. The opening of the pass is expected to bolster the economy of the region and play a key role in the growing China-Indian trade.

In a major embarrassment for China, the 17th Karmapa, Urgyen Trinley Dorje, who was proclaimed by China, made a dramatic escape from Tibet to the Rumtek Monastery in Sikkim. Chinese officials were in a quandary on this issue, as any protest to India on the issue would mean an explicit endorsement of India's governance of Sikkim, which the Chinese still hadn't recognized.

The Chinese government eventually agreed to recognize Sikkim as an Indian state in 2003, in return for India declaring Tibet as a part of the territory of China; New Delhi had accepted Tibet as part of China in 1954. Still, China appears to have believed that the agreement had lapsed. The 2003 agreement led to a thaw in Sino-Indian relations as the two countries moved towards resolving their border disputes.

In 2004, the two countries proposed opening up the Nathula and Jelepla Passes in Sikkim. 2004 was a milestone in China-Indian bilateral trade, surpassing the US$10 billion mark for the first time. In April 2005, Chinese Premier Wen Jiabao visited Bangalore to push for increased China-Indian cooperation in high-tech industries. Wen stated that the 21st century will be "the Asian century of the IT industry." Regarding the issue of India gaining a permanent seat on the UN Security Council, Wen Jiabao initially seemed to support the idea, but had returned to a neutral position.

In the South Asian Association for Regional Cooperation (SAARC) Summit in 2005, China was granted observer status. While other countries in the region are ready to consider China for permanent membership in the SAARC, India seemed reluctant.

In 2005, China and India signed the 'Strategic and Cooperative Partnership for Peace and Prosperity'. However, there has been very little, if any, strategic convergence between the two countries.

Issues surrounding energy have risen in significance. Both countries have growing energy demand to support economic growth. Both countries signed an agreement in 2006 to envisage ONGC Videsh Ltd (OVL) and the China National Petroleum Corporation (CNPC) placing joint bids for promising projects.

In 2006, China and India re-opened the Nathula pass for trading; Nathula had been closed for 44 years before 2006. The re-opening of border trade helps to ease the economic isolation of the region. In November 2006, China and India had a verbal spat over the claim of the north-east Indian state of Arunachal Pradesh. India claimed that China was occupying 38,000 square kilometres of its territory in Kashmir, while China claimed the whole of Arunachal Pradesh as its own.

In 2007, China denied the application for a visa from an Indian Administrative Service officer in Arunachal Pradesh. According to China, since Arunachal Pradesh is a territory of China, he would not need a visa to visit his own country. Later in December 2007, China reversed its policy by granting a visa to Marpe Sora, an Arunachal-born professor in computer science. In January 2008, Prime Minister Manmohan Singh visited China to discuss trade, commerce, defence, military, and various other issues.

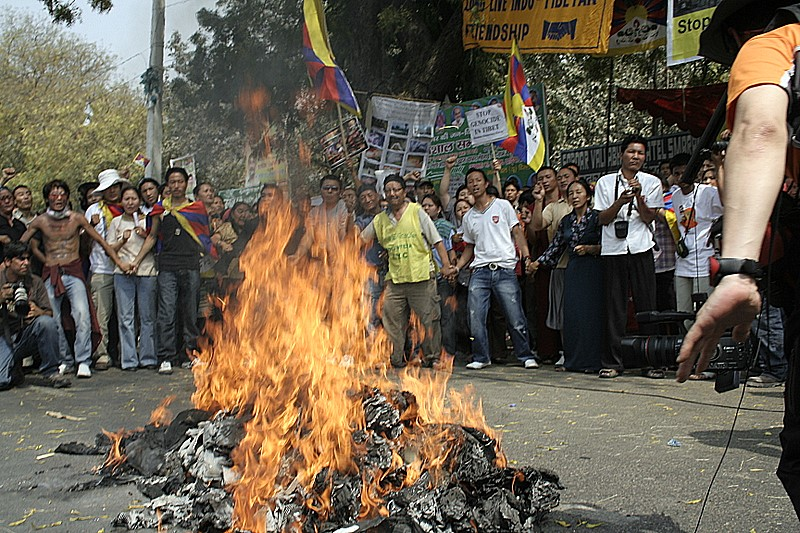
Hundreds of Tibetans protested against the Chinese government in New Delhi, 2008.

Until 2008, the British Government's position remained the same as it had been since the Simla Accord of 1913: that China held suzerainty over Tibet but not sovereignty. Britain revised this view on 29 October 2008, when it recognized Chinese sovereignty over Tibet through its website. The Economist stated that although the British Foreign Office's website does not use the word sovereignty, officials at the Foreign Office said "it means that, as far as Britain is concerned, 'Tibet is part of China. Full stop.'" This change in Britain's position affects India's claim to its North Eastern territories, which rely on the same Simla Accord that Britain's prior position on Tibet's sovereignty was based upon.

In October 2009, the Asian Development Bank formally acknowledged Arunachal Pradesh as part of India and approved a loan to India for a development project there. Earlier, China had exercised pressure on the bank to cease the loan. However, India succeeded in securing the loan with the help of the United States and Japan. China expressed displeasure at the ADB.

=== 2010s ===
Chinese Premier Wen Jiabao paid an official visit to India from 15 to 17 December 2010, at the invitation of Prime Minister Manmohan Singh. He was accompanied by 400 Chinese business leaders, who wished to sign business deals with Indian companies. During this visit, Premier Wen Jiabao said "India and China are two very populous countries with ancient civilisations, friendship between the two countries has a time-honoured history, which can be dated back 2,000 years".

In April 2011, during the BRICS summit in Sanya, Hainan, China, the two countries agreed to restore defence cooperation and China had hinted that it may reverse its policy of administering stapled visas to residents of Jammu and Kashmir. This practice was later stopped, and as a result, defence ties were resumed between the two countries and joint military drills were expected.

In the March 2012 BRICS summit in New Delhi, CCP General Secretary and Chinese leader Hu Jintao told Indian Prime Minister Manmohan Singh that "it is China's unswerving policy to develop China-Indian friendship, deepen strategic cooperation, and seek common development". Other topics were discussed, including border dispute problems and a unified BRICS central bank. In April 2012, in response to India's test of an Agni-V missile capable of carrying a nuclear warhead to Beijing, the PRC called for the two countries to "cherish the hard-earned momentum of co-operation".

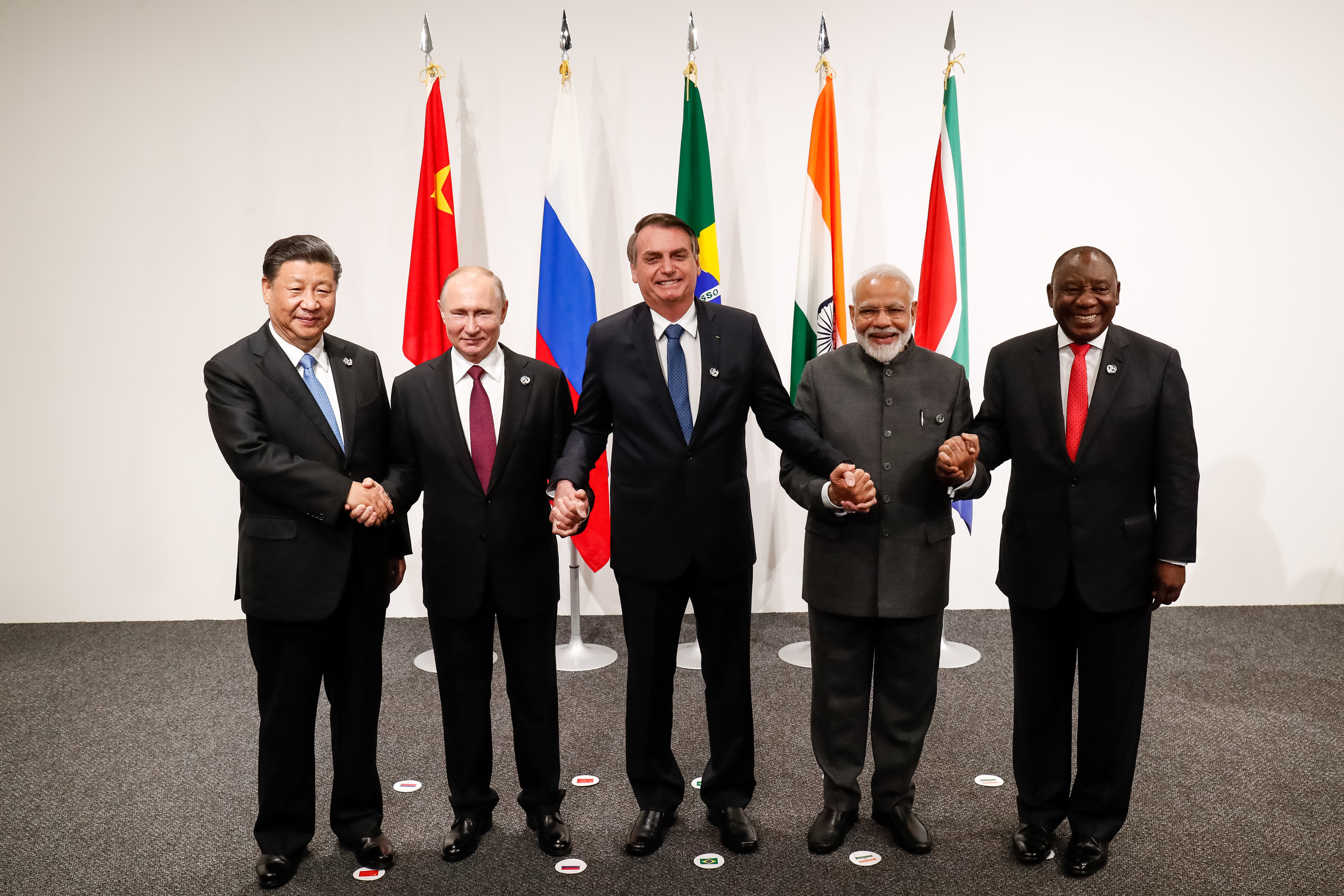
The BRICS leaders in the 2019 G20 Osaka summit.

The 2013 Depsang standoff lasted for three weeks, before being defused on 5 May 2013. Days before a trip by Indian Foreign Minister Salman Khurshid to China, Khurshid said that both countries had a shared interest in not having the border issue exacerbate or "destroy" long-term progress in relations. The Chinese agreed to withdraw their troops in exchange for an Indian agreement to demolish several "live-in bunkers" 250 km to the south, in the disputed Chumar sector. Chinese Premier Li Keqiang made his first foreign visit to India on 18 May 2013. Indian President Pranab Mukherjee's visit to Arunachal Pradesh in late November 2013 and mentioning in his speech that the area was an "integral and important part of India" angered Beijing, and retaliatory statements followed.

General Secretary of the Chinese Communist Party Xi Jinping was one of the top world leaders to visit New Delhi after Narendra Modi took over as Prime Minister of India in 2014. India's insistence to raise the South China Sea in various multilateral forums subsequently did not help that beginning once again, the relationship facing suspicion from Indian administration and media alike. In September 2014, the relationship took a sting as troops of the People's Liberation Army reportedly entered two kilometres inside the Line of Actual Control in the Chumar sector. The next month, V. K. Singh said that China and India had come to a "convergence of views" on the threat of terrorism emanating from Pakistan.

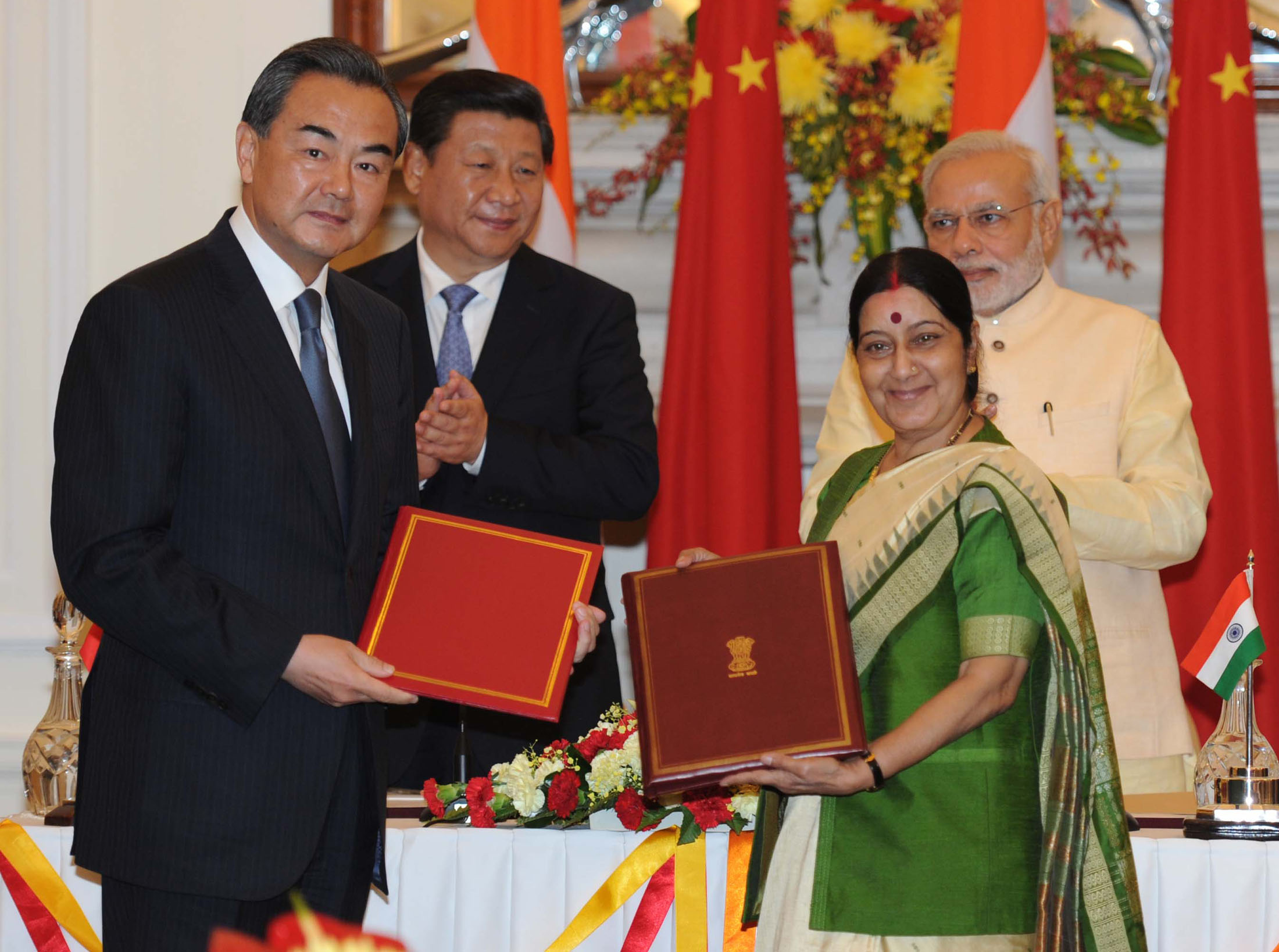
The Chinese leader and Indian Prime Minister witnessing the signing of a memorandum of understanding between the Chinese and Indian foreign affairs ministers on opening a new route for Indian pilgrimage (Kailash Mansarovar Yatra) to the Tibet Autonomous Region of the People's Republic of China, in New Delhi in 2014

China and India have been working together to produce films together, such as Kung Fu Yoga starring Jackie Chan. However, disruptions have risen again due to China building trade routes, the China–Pakistan Economic Corridor, with Pakistan on disputed Kashmir territory. On 16 June 2017, Chinese troops with construction vehicles and road-building equipment began extending an existing road southward in Doklam, a territory which is claimed by both China as well as India's ally Bhutan. On 18 June 2017, around 270 Indian troops, with weapons and two bulldozers, entered Doklam to stop the Chinese troops from constructing the road. Among other charges, China accused India of illegal intrusion into its territory—what it called the mutually agreed China-India boundary, and violation of its territorial sovereignty and UN Charter. India accused China of changing the status quo in violation of a 2012 understanding between the two governments regarding the tri-junction boundary points and causing "security concerns", which were widely understood as its concerns with the strategic Siliguri Corridor. India media reported that on 28 June, Bhutan issued a demarche, demanding that China cease road-building in Doklam and leave the area as is. The Minister of External Affairs of India at the time, Sushma Swaraj, asserted that if China unilaterally altered the status-quo of the tri-junction point between China-India and Bhutan, the nation would be posing a challenge to India's security. China repeatedly stated that India's withdrawal was a prerequisite for meaningful dialogue. On 21 July 2017, the Minister of External Affairs of India Sushma Swaraj said that for dialogue, both India and China must withdraw their troops. On 2 August 2017, the Ministry of Foreign Affairs of China published a document claiming that Indian border forces had illegally crossed the border between China and India and detailed China's position on the matter. The document said that China notified India regarding its plan to construct a road in advance, "in full reflection of China's goodwill". The Indian Foreign Ministry replied by referring towards their earlier press release on this matter, as opposed to a point-by-point rebuttal. On 28 August 2017, China and India reached a consensus to end the border stand-off.

In May 2018, the two countries agreed to coordinate their development programmes in Afghanistan in the areas of health, education, and food security.

In 2019, India reiterated that it would not join China's Belt and Road Initiative, stating that it cannot accept a project that ignores concerns about its territorial integrity. The BRI's China-Pakistan Economic Corridor goes through Pakistan-controlled Kashmir, and therefore India believes that being party to the arrangement would undermine its assertions of sovereignty in Kashmir. Another Indian perspective is that the BRI could increase China's influence in the Indian Ocean region and therefore decrease India's regional influence.

On 11 October 2019, Chinese leader Xi Jinping met with Indian Prime Minister Narendra Modi at Mahabalipuram, Tamil Nadu, India, for a second informal meeting between India and China. Modi and Xi Jinping met 18 times between 2014 and 2019.

China offered public health and economic assistance to India in response to the COVID-19 pandemic, although India refused per the United States' request.

=== 2020s ===
The disputed territory of Kashmir is administered by Pakistan (green and lime), India (blue and turquoise) and China (yellow).

On 10 May 2020, Chinese and Indian troops clashed in Nathu La, Sikkim, leaving 11 soldiers injured. Following the skirmishes in Sikkim, tensions between the two countries grew in Ladakh, with a buildup of troops at multiple locations. There were 20 Indian soldiers and an unknown number of PLA soldiers killed on the night of 15/16 June. China reinforced troops near the Indian border with Tibet, Chinese state media reported. Bilateral agreements between India and China prevent the use of guns along the line of actual control. However, these skirmishes saw the first shots, warning shots, being fired in decades.

Following the deaths, Prime Minister Modi addressed the nation about the incident, saying that "the sacrifice made by our soldiers will not go in vain", while the Indian foreign minister told the Chinese foreign minister that Chinese actions in Galwan were "pre-meditated". Following the Galwan Valley clash on 15 June 2020, there were renewed calls across India to boycott Chinese goods. However, numerous Indian government officials said that border tensions would have little impact on trade.

On 29 June 2020, the Indian government banned 59 widely used Chinese mobile phone and desktop applications in response to rising tensions and escalating diplomatic dispute between the two nations. On 19 August, The Times of India reported that the ministry of external affairs of India has been told that visas for Chinese businessmen, academics, industry experts, and advocacy groups will need prior security clearance, and the measures are similar to those that have long been employed with Pakistan. On 19 September, India police arrested a freelance journalist for passing sensitive information to Chinese intelligence.

On 27 October 2020, the United States and India signed the Basic Exchange and Cooperation Agreement, enabling greater information-sharing and further defense cooperation, to counter China's growing military power in the region.

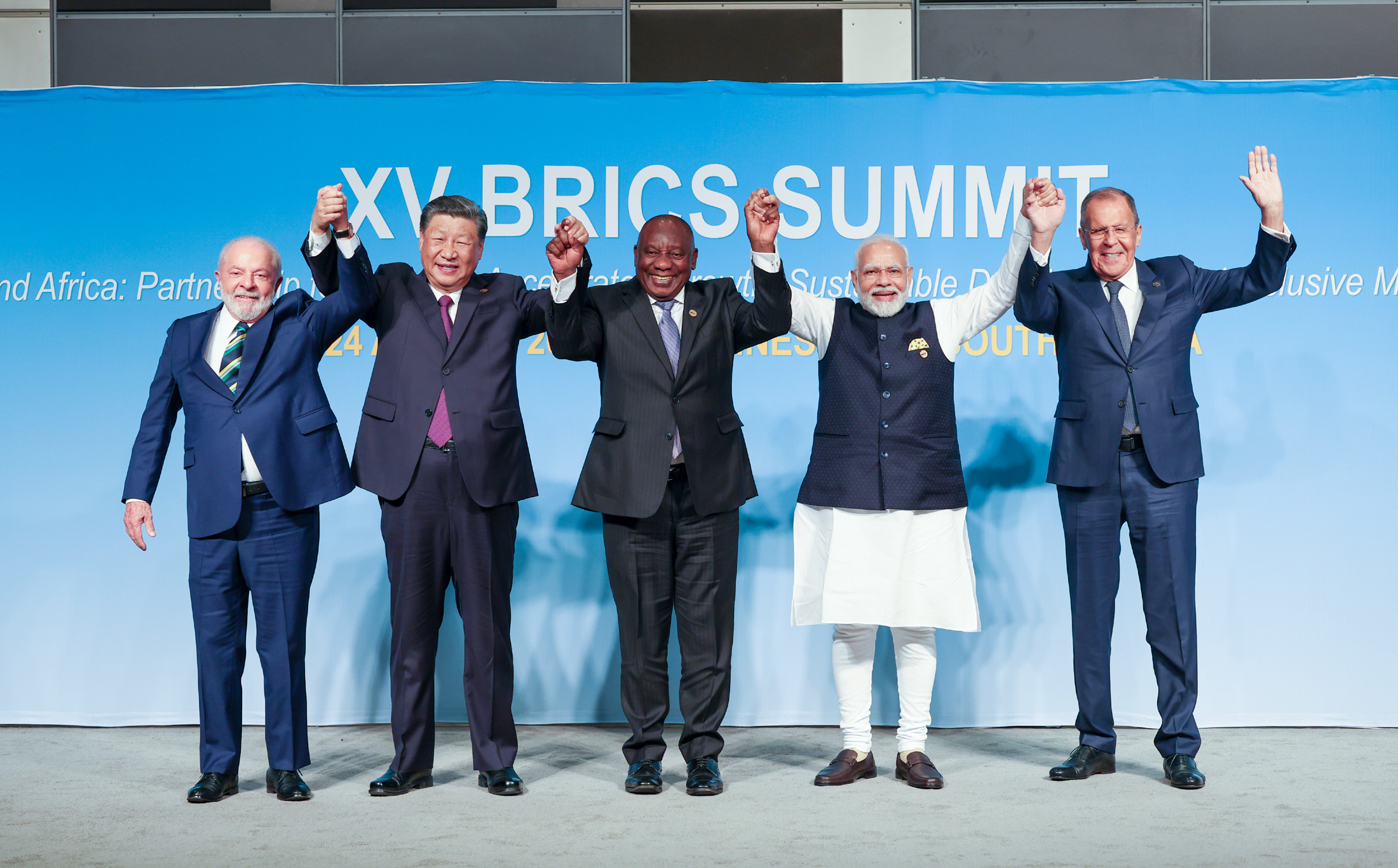
The BRICS leaders in 2023, including Xi Jinping and Narendra Modi

After the 2022 visit by Nancy Pelosi to Taiwan, the Ministry of Foreign Affairs of India responded, "Like many other countries, India, too, is concerned at recent developments. We urge the exercise of restraint, avoidance of unilateral actions to change the status quo, de-escalation of tensions, and efforts to maintain peace and stability in the region." India stopped reiterating the so-called "One China" policy as early as 2010.

In September 2022, India and China pulled back soldiers from a friction point along the line of actual control. However, according to India's Ministry for External Affairs, the situation on the Line of Actual Control is "still not normal". The Diplomat has reported that normalcy around the border between the countries seems unlikely and may not develop further.

On 6 October 2022, India abstained on a draft resolution in the UNHRC on "holding a debate on the situation of human rights in the Xinjiang Autonomous Region of China"

In June 2023, China placed a technical hold on a proposal moved by the U.S. and co-designated by India to sanction accused Pakistani terrorist Sajid Mir under the 12/67 Al Qaeda Sanctions Committee of the UN Security Council. Mir had previously orchestrated bombings in Mumbai, killing some 175 people. India heavily criticized the Chinese decision.

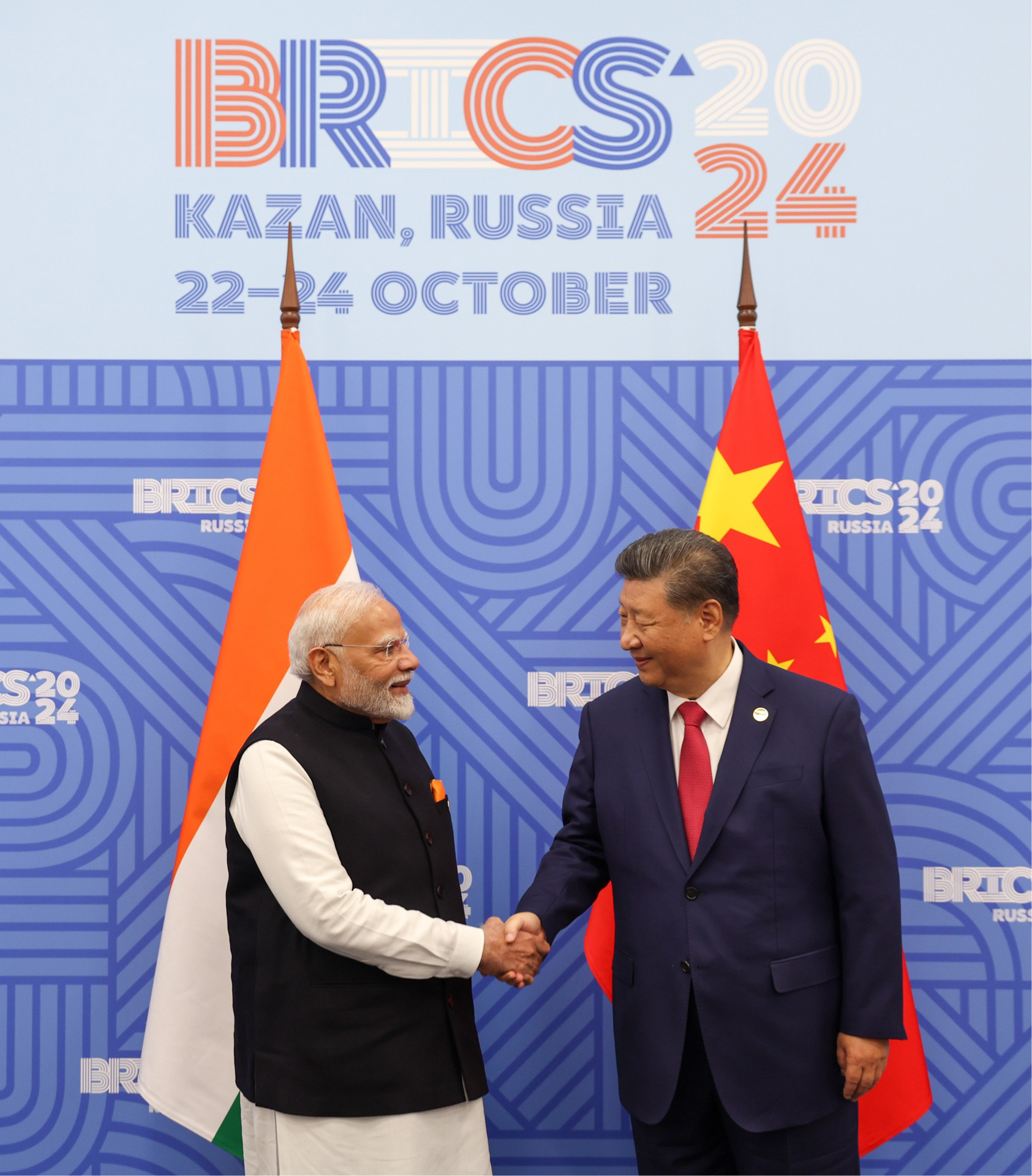
Narendra Modi meeting Xi Jinping at the 16th BRICS summit in Kazan, Russia, 23 October 2024

On 25 August 2023 during the 15th BRICS summit in Johannesburg, South Africa, Modi and Xi spoke on the summit's sidelines, where they agreed to de-escalate tensions at the border. The Ministry of Foreign Affairs of China said both leaders "had a candid and in-depth exchange of views on current China-India relations” and Xi stated that "improving China-India relations serves the common interests of the two countries and peoples”, while the Ministry of External Affairs of India stated that during the meeting Modi "underlined that the maintenance of peace and tranquility in the border areas, and observing and respecting the LAC are essential for the normalization of the India-China relationship." The meeting was seen as a step toward mending the bilateral relations between the two countries.

In October 2024, India announced that it had reached an agreement over patrolling arrangements along the Line of Actual Control (LAC) in the border area, which would lead to disengagement and resolution of the long-running conflict that began in 2020.

In January 2025, China and India agreed to resume direct flights between the two countries after nearly 5 years.

In April 2025, India launched its biggest-ever joint naval exercise with African nations as part of a push to boost its influence on the continent. The military exercises were perceived as a show of force to China, whose influence in Africa is significant. India also announced the resumption of the Kailash Mansarovar Yatra in April 2025, after a period of five years, in a bid to normalise relations between the two nations.

On 26 June 2025, Indian Defence Minister Rajnath Singh met his Chinese counterpart Dong Jun on the sidelines of the SCO defence ministers’ meeting in Qingdao, where he called for a permanent resolution to the border dispute through a “structured roadmap of permanent engagement and de-escalation.” Singh emphasised the need to “rejuvenate the established mechanism” for border demarcation and urged both sides to maintain “positive momentum” while avoiding new complications. He also stressed the importance of “bridging the trust deficit” created after the 2020 standoff by “taking action on ground.” Additionally, Singh briefed the Chinese side on the 22 April Pahalgam attack and India's Operation Sindoor, launched to dismantle cross-border terrorist networks. On 22 July 2025, India announced that it would resume issuing tourist visas for Chinese citizens, ending a five-year suspension imposed following the 2020 border skirmishes.

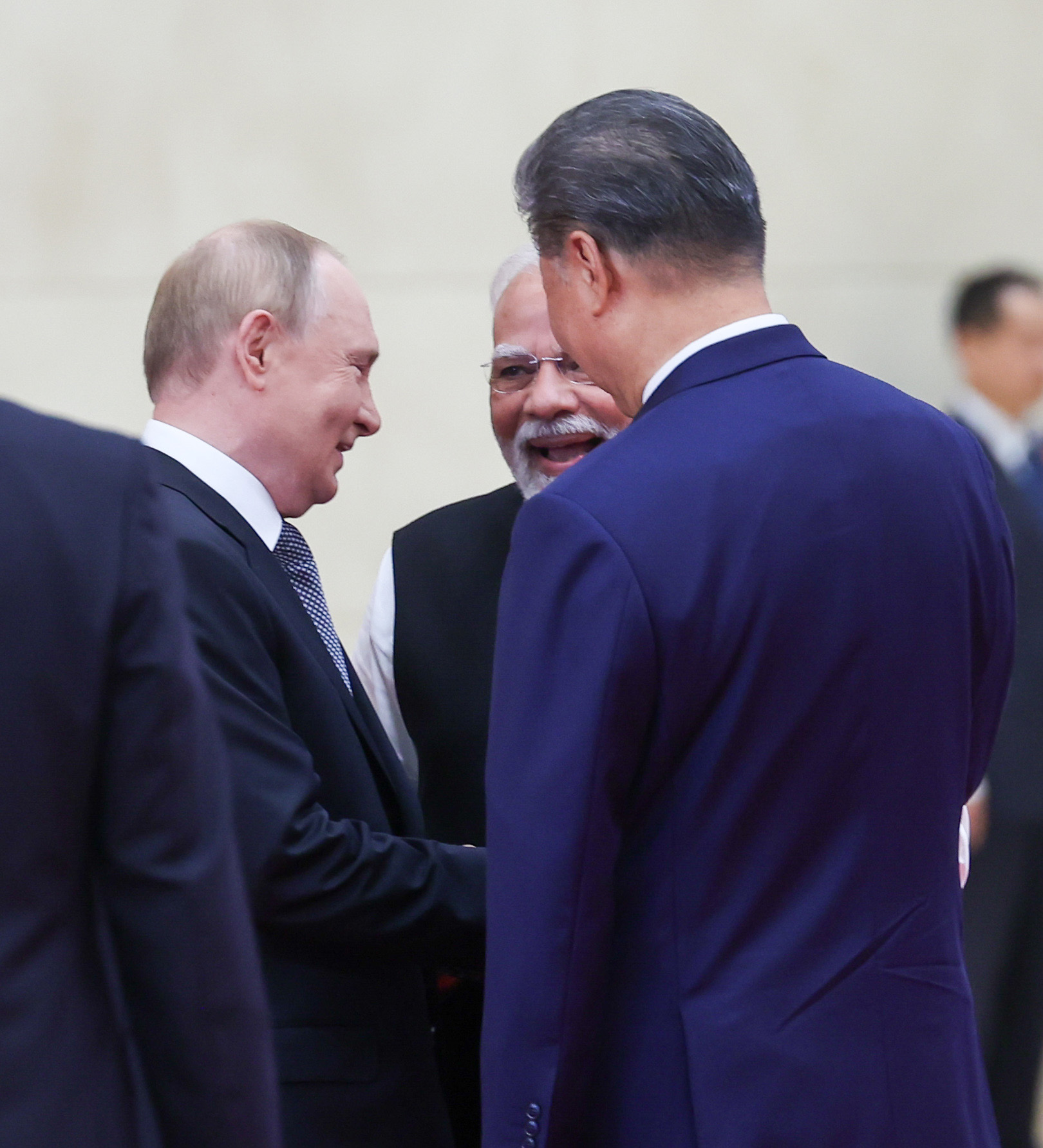
Modi with Xi Jinping and Vladimir Putin at the SCO summit in Tianjin, China, 1 September 2025

In a sign of growing diplomatic engagement and economic cooperation, China has reportedly agreed to address India's concerns over export curbs on key commodities such as fertilisers, rare earth magnets and minerals, and tunnel boring machines. The understanding followed high-level discussions between China's Director of the Office of the Central Foreign Affairs Commission Wang Yi and Indian External Affairs Minister S.Jaishankar during Wang's two-day visit to India in July 2025. According to Reports, Chinese authorities have begun responding to India's requests on these critical goods. The move is viewed as part of broader efforts to improve bilateral ties, reflecting the two nations’ long-shared history and mutual interest in regional stability.

In September 2025, Prime Minister of India Narendra Modi met General Secretary of the Chinese Communist Party Xi Jinping in Tianjin, calling for India and China to act as partners rather than rivals. They agreed to resume direct flights, tourist visas, and the Kailash Mansarovar Yatra, suspended during the COVID-19 pandemic, and emphasized strategic autonomy while expanding cooperation on regional and global issues.

On 12 September 2026, Indian PM Narendra Modi and Chinese leader Xi Jinping met on the 18th BRICS summit sidelines during Xi's first visit to India in seven years. The two leaders discussed border stability, trade imbalances, market access, transport links and broader economic ties, in what was widely interpreted as a cautious attempt to stabilise China–India relations.

== Triangular relations ==
The United States and Russia (previously the Soviet Union) have been a consistent part of developments in Chinese and Indian relations.

As a major power, Japan has also been part of China–India relations, with initiatives such as the Quadrilateral Security Dialogue. Pakistan and China share warm relations that drive Chinese infrastructure projects in the disputed territory of northern Kashmir. The Middle East, Latin America, and Africa are places where both India and China engage and compete. The Middle East is important to both countries in terms of their energy security. In Africa, China and India seem most engaged across a wide variety of issues, from development to peacekeeping. In South Asia and South-East Asia, a power balance struggle between China and India is seen in triangular relations.

=== Nepal ===
Nepal's geostrategic situation during periods of heightened tensions between China and India, such as during the 1962 war, resulted in varying shades of cautionary neutrality when making statements. Nepal's Permanent Representative stated, "we do not want to pass judgement on the merits of Sino-Indian border dispute. As a country friendly to both...". Tulsi Giri, then the Nepalese foreign minister, stated, "Nepal's relations with India will remain close [...] Yet, Nepal has a 600-mile boundary with China, China has now emerged as a great power. Friendly relations with our northern neighbour (China) should be the natural aim of the country's foreign policy." During the time Tibet was independent, Nepal played the role as an important buffer state and was central to influence between the regions.

The China-Nepal-India Economic Corridor (CNIEC) was proposed by China in April 2018. It is an extension of the agreed upon China-Nepal Trans-Himalayan Multi-dimensional Connectivity Network into India. While China and Nepal have shown favourable reactions towards CNIEC, India is "indifferent". This indifference is postulated to stem from CNIEC being a part of BRI, China's growing influence over Nepal, and an end to "India's monopoly over Nepal's transit points and Nepal's attempt to end its dependency on India".

=== United States ===
On 11 November 1950, Sri Aurobindo wrote in Mother India,

"The gesture that can save is to take a firm line with China, denounce openly her nefarious intentions, stand without reservations by the USA [...] Militarily, China is almost ten times as strong as we are, but India as the spearhead of an American defence of democracy can easily halt Mao’s mechanised millions."

On 28 March 1963, Sudhir Ghosh recorded the President of the United States John F Kennedy's reaction on reading Sri Aurobindo's words, "One great Indian, Nehru, showed you the path of non-alignment between China and America, and another great Indian Aurobindo, showed you another way of survival. The choice is up to the people of India." Earlier in the meeting, Ghosh recorded Kennedy's reaction to a letter from Nehru: "He indignantly said that only a few months earlier when Mr Nehru was overwhelmed by the power of Communist China, he made desperate appeal to him for air protection, and non-alignment or no non-alignment, the President had to respond. He added sarcastically that Mr Nehru's conversion lasted only a few days".

Unlike the left-wing diplomatic leanings of the Indian Congress Party, the BJP administration has strengthened its strategic partnership with the United States. China faces combined challenges to its influence with its neighbors, and because it sees a growing threat from India and the United States' cooperation, it has exaggerated the discord between the two countries to divide and conquer its rivals.

India participated in the restart of Quadrilateral Security Dialogue, and has strengthened the military, diplomatic, and economic cooperation with the United States, Japan, and Australia. More recently, after the deadly Chinese-initiated clash at Galwan Valley in June 2020, preceded by the 2017 Doklam standoff, the U.S.-based think tank, the Center for Foreign Relations, explained that there was a significant ramp-up in QUAD activity. The group cites how, since 2020, the group has looked beyond regional cooperation and have focused on checking Chinese regional behavior, with the four navies performing their first joint exercise in over a decade in November 2020. This was specifically initiated by India in response to the border skirmishes.

=== Africa ===
In July 2025, during an address to the Parliament of Ghana, Indian Prime Minister Narendra Modi made a tacit critique of China's lending practices in Africa, contrasting them with India's approach to development cooperation. Without directly naming China, Modi emphasized that India's partnerships in Africa are demand-driven, aimed at building local capacities and self-sustaining ecosystems, rather than creating debt burdens. He highlighted India's support for Africa's Agenda 2063 and underscored the importance of growing together as equals.

=== Indo-Pacific ===
Pakistan, and more importantly, Myanmar, other than India itself, are potential land routes into the Indian Ocean. Pan Qi, Vice Minister for Communications, wrote in 1985 that China would need to find an outlet for its landlocked provinces. At the time, he suggested routes to the Indian Ocean through Myanmar.

In the same vein of invigorating relationships with geopolitical allies, India has also strengthened their Look East Policy, transforming it into the Act East Policy under the Modi administration. The rebranded Act East Policy has an increased focus on infrastructure projects, such as the Agartala-Akhaura Rail Project and the Asian Trilateral Highway. Such geopolitical connectivity measures improved India's alliances with the Philippines, Malaysia, and Vietnam to check Chinese dominance. These soft power measures also enhance Indian border security.

=== Western Indian Ocean ===
The Western Indian Ocean has been characterised as an emerging "geopolitical theatre" marked by interstate conflict between India, China and the US. The regions holds key geostrategic importance to all three states. Roughly 40 percent of world trade passes through the region as ,well as two two-thirdsglobal oil and gas supplies. It is a main gateway for global energy supply and two of the world's most important maritime chokepoints, the Bab-el Mandeb and Hormuz strait, are both located in the Western Indian Ocean region. India and China are both dependent on access and free passage in the Western Indian Ocean as it is crucial to secure the increasing energy demand by the two growing economies/ The US is also dependent on the free passage of oil from the Middle East to the trans-Atlantic world through the region.

India and China are both motivated by defensive interests in securing their supplies of energy and trade in the region. Beyond this, both states are attempting to increase their relative power positions, economically as well as militarily and naval. This is commonly understood through the terms String of Pearls regarding China and India's Act East Policy. This could potentially align the two countries against the US, but this does not seem to be the case. India and China continue to strive for similar power positions, and power rivalry between the two states continues.

Beijing is refusing to see India as a regional power and from an Indian perspective the Indian Ocean is largely seen as “India’s Ocean”. Any Chinese encroachment on India's sphere of interest is seen as a potential threat. To counter increased Chinese naval and economic presence India has joined the Quad-alliance between the US, Japan and Australia and is carrying out naval missions with the US, China's core strategic rival. As such, Sino-Indian relations in the Western Indian Ocean can be understood in terms of a triangular relationship of continuous counterbalancing between the three states.

Both India and China have interests in containing the influence of the other, yet none of them has the capacity to fully do this. India's aspirations to become a great regional power are constrained for several reasons. New Delhi's focus has traditionally been directed towards the continent, and its naval development is lagging behind both China and the US. Scholars also point towards the lack of a coherent maritime strategy despite increased political attention to the issue, for example through its Act East policy. Political protectionist tendencies have allowed China to increase its relative economic influence, overtaking India's position as main trading partner in various countries in the region. In 2005, China surpassed India and became Bangladesh's main trading partner. Despite these constraints, China does not have the capacity to fully contain India. India continues to hold a special position in the region due to its dominating geographical position, history and, interstate relations. Furthermore, it is in US interests to counterbalance China's increased naval strength through cooperation with India.

As such, geopolitical rivalry and strategic counterbalancing remain unsettled in the Western Indian Ocean, and intensified rivalry between India and China seems to be the most likely trajectory some time to come. This has substantial security implications as the increased militarisation decreases trust between the states and thus complicates cooperation over persisting security problems such as piracy. A potential risk of militarisation at sea is that offence-defence tactics are often difficult to distinguish. Even if India and China followed solely defensive strategies, as it has been claimed, it might be perceived as offensive tactics within the maritime domain. Furthermore, both states are deploying military and naval means beyond what is commonly seen as necessary to defend global shipping routes. This includes nuclear-powered submarines sent by China to fight piracy in the region.

== Military relations ==
=== Border clashes ===
Since the 1950s, during the term of India's first prime minister Jawaharlal Nehru, India and China have repeatedly encountered border disputes at the Line of Actual Control, delineating the border between the two nations. The first Sino-India border war broke out in 1962 at the Aksai Chin region, escalating into a month-long military conflict. Initiating the conflict, China took advantage of global concern about the ongoing Cuban missile crisis to time their regional invasion in hopes of building a military road in India's Ladakh region.

During the Narendra Modi administration, bloody clashes erupted again on the Sino-Indian border. The strategic alliance between China and Pakistan, and the vigorous arming of the Pakistani forces, make India face the threat of a two-front war. Indian officials said the huge differences between the two sides on the border issue "eroded the entire basis" of their relationship.

=== Maritime concerns ===
According to Center for Strategic and International Studies (CSIS), since 2020, Chinese research vessels with dual-use capabilities have expanded operations in the Indian Ocean Region, raising concerns. While framed as scientific missions, these surveys—conducted by ships linked to state and military institutions—collect oceanographic data critical for submarine operations and undersea warfare. Vessels such as Xiang Yang Hong 06 and Shiyan 06 have mapped the seafloor, deployed sensors, and operated near Indian waters, sometimes while concealing their presence by disabling identification systems. Despite the evidence presented in a 2024 study conducted by the CSIS, Chinese state-media Global Times dismissed the concerns as a "China Threat Narrative".

Chinese vessels have operated near sensitive maritime zones and within the EEZs of regional countries, prompting India to increase naval surveillance and diplomatic engagement. In early 2024, Sri Lanka, imposed a temporary moratorium on Chinese research vessels docking at its ports, reflecting growing regional resistance to Beijing's opaque maritime activities.

In July 2025, a Chinese research vessel was caught operating covertly in the Bay of Bengal near Indian waters, according to a French maritime intelligence firm. The ship had switched off its Automatic Identification System (AIS) but was tracked via radio frequency signals. It was likely conducting strategic activities such as seafloor mapping, acoustic analysis, and identifying submarine transit routes—operations linked to surveillance and anti-submarine warfare.

=== Military exercises ===
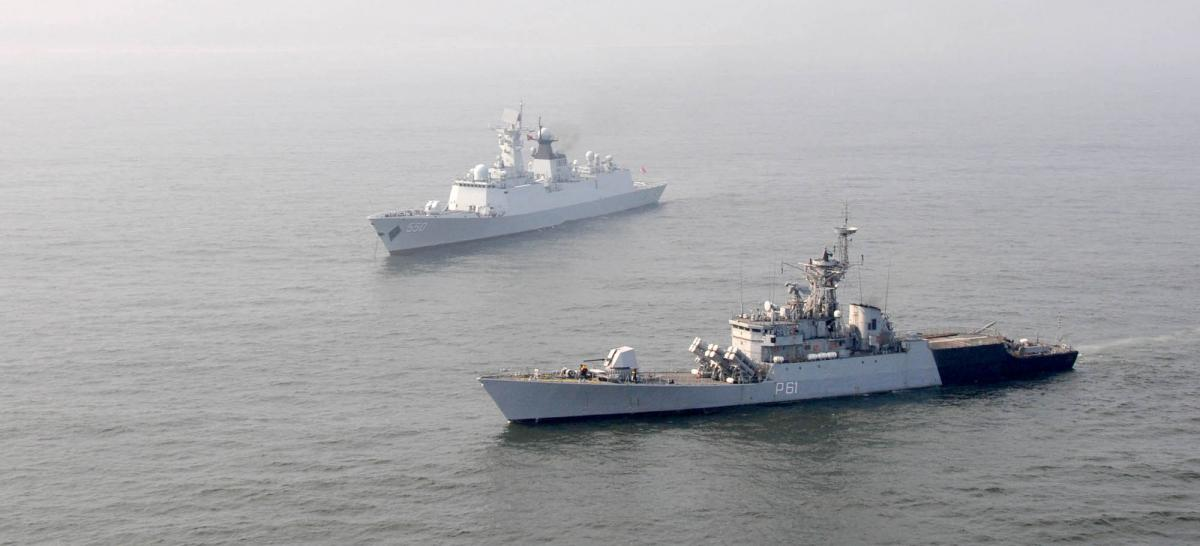
INS Kora (P61) escorting PLA Navy Ship Weifang off Visakhapatnam, India, in May 2014, during their visit to the Indian Navy's Eastern Naval Command.

China and India conduct a joint military exercise called 'Exercise Hand–in–Hand'. The exercise began in 2007, with the second edition taking place in 2008. The third, fifth, and seventh editions of Hand-in-Hand were conducted in China in 2013, 2015, and 2018, respectively, while the fourth edition and sixth editions were held in India in 2014 and 2016. The eighth edition was held in India in 2019. While bilateral military exercises between India and China have ceased over the past few years, India is still accepting invitations from Russia for multilateral armed forces exercises that also happen to host Chinese soldiers.

== Water sharing and hydro–politics ==
A total of seven rivers that start in Tibet flow through India — Indus, Satlej, Karnali (Ghaghara), Subansiri, Brahmaputra, and Lohit (and its tributary Dulai).

Brahma Chellaney has written that "India's formal recognition of Chinese sovereignty over Tibet constitutes the single biggest security blunder with lasting consequences for Indian territorial and river-water interests".

India has concerns with China's water diversion, dam–building, and inter–river plans. More so, in a conflict, India fears that China can use the rivers as leverage. China has already constructed ten dams on the Brahmaputra and its tributaries, such as the Zangmu Dam, and there has been talk of China building a mega–dam at the "great bend" called the Motuo Dam. India's concerns also stem from the fact that China does not cooperate with regard to timely sharing of information related to projects which would impact water sharing, nor does China allow Indian experts to visit dam sites. There are several memoranda of understanding on hydrological data sharing between the two countries with regard to the Brahmaputra, including emergency management.

An alternate view is also presented in relation to "misinformation spread by some (Indian) newspapers" and the waters of Brahmaputra — "80 percent of the waters of the Brahmaputra emanate from the north side of the Himalayas in China and that that country cannot be the sole arbiter of its international waters. This is not right. Eighty percent of the waters of the mighty Brahmaputra are picked up after it enters India" and that Chinese activities have helped India by reducing annual flood intensity in the north-east.

India formally “registered its concern with China” in December 2024 over construction of Medog Dam, also known as the Motuo Hydropower Station, the country's external affairs minister told lawmakers in March 2025, adding that the project figured prominently in talks between the nations in January 2025.

In 2025, while India expressed significant concerns over China's construction of the Motuo Hydropower Station on the Yarlung Tsangpo River in Tibet, citing potential threats to water security, environmental stability, and regional livelihoods, Indian officials and experts warned that the project could enable China to control or divert river flows into India, affecting the Siang and Brahmaputra rivers, which are vital for millions in the northeastern states. Arunachal Pradesh Chief Minister Pema Khandu described the dam as an "existential threat" to indigenous communities such as the Adi tribe, highlighting risks of water scarcity or catastrophic flooding due to sudden water releases. The Indian government formally urged China to ensure transparency, consult downstream countries, and safeguard the interests of riparian states, framing the issue as a matter of regional cooperation and stability. Some experts, observers, and individuals from the journalistic fraternity from India have also expressed concerns. Dr. Jogendranath Sharma, an eminent geologist and retired professor from Dibrugarh University, cautioned that China's proposed 60,000 MW Medog Hydropower Project, located in a seismically active and ecologically sensitive region, could trigger severe natural disasters in downstream Assam. He cited potential risks including erosion from “hungry water,” disruption of groundwater systems, altered monsoon patterns, and threats to biodiversity and livelihoods, and advocated for a joint Indo-China environmental impact assessment.

On 19 July 2025, the Yarlung Zangbo hydropower project of China officially commenced construction. India and Bangladesh have raised concerns about the impact in their countries when the dam becomes operational after 2030.

In August 2025, India reiterated its concerns over China's Medog Hydropower Station, citing risks to regional water security, ecology, and downstream livelihoods. The Ministry of External Affairs stated that the project was being closely monitored and that India had repeatedly urged Beijing to ensure transparency and consult downstream countries. External Affairs Minister S. Jaishankar raised the issue during his July 2025 visit to China for the Shanghai Cooperation Organisation Foreign Ministers’ Meeting, also calling for the resumption of suspended hydrological data sharing.

Indian observers have raised concerns about the legality of China's unilateral actions in asserting upstream control over transboundary rivers. Aravind Yelery, associate professor at Jawaharlal Nehru University, described China's approach as neglecting its responsibility to preserve river flows, suggesting it is driven by geopolitical ambitions and poses environmental and diplomatic risks. He noted similar patterns in China's management of the Mekong River, where multiple dams have been built without formal riparian agreements. Atul Kumar, a fellow at the Observer Research Foundation, highlighted that China has not entered into water-sharing treaties with its neighbors and often withholds hydrological data during periods of strained relations.

== Economic relations ==
India-China economic relations have been institutionalized through the Joint Economic Group and Business Council, as well as more focused efforts such as the "Agreement on the Avoidance of Double Taxation".

China and India have developed their own complementary skills following a period in which they had cut themselves off from each other. By 2007, while China excelled at cost-effective manufacturing, India was skilled in cost-effective designing and development. In 2007, Tarun Khanna wrote in Harvard Business Review that "The simplest, and most powerful, way of combining China and India is to focus on hardware in China and on software in India." In the 2009 book "Getting China and India Right", the authors suggest a China plus India strategy to strategically benefit from both India's and China's scale, complementary strengths, and reducing the risk of being unilaterally present.

There are cases when Indian companies have gone to China and done well, such as Mahindra and Mahindra, while Chinese companies such as Huawei have done well in India. Huawei set up its Indian unit in 1999 and by 2007, had 1500 engineers. Huawei's Bangalore unit, already one of Huawei's most important research and development centres, was Capability Maturity Model Level 5 certified in 2003.

In the oil sector, there is competition and engagement — China's Sinopec and China National Petroleum Corporation and India's Oil and Natural Gas Corporation fight over oil assets in some regions, while winning bids as joint ventures in others such as Syria, Colombia, Angola, and Venezuela.

Since the deterioration of relations between the two countries in the 2010s, India has banned a large number of Chinese technology companies and software, including Huawei, TikTok, WeChat, etc., from entering the Indian market. To reduce Western countries' previous dependence on Chinese products, India plays an integral role in boosting supply chain resilience through friendshoring.

On 18 January 2024, at the World Economic Forum 2024 in Davos, Switzerland, top Indian industrial policy bureaucrat Rajesh Kumar Singh told Reuters that due to easing of border tensions between India and China in 2023, India could reduce its heightened scrutiny of Chinese investments in India, although the timeframe for it was not given.

In July 2025, China reportedly recalled over 300 engineers from Foxconn's iPhone plant in India. India responded by partnering with Taiwan, the US, South Korea, and Japan to secure engineers and critical manufacturing equipment. In December 2025, India imposed anti-dumping duties on rolled Chinese steel.

China's growing economic and political ties with India are reshaping regional dynamics. India's trade with China has reached $155 billion, significantly surpassing trade between China and its other partners. As India's economy expands rapidly, stalled infrastructure projects and investment risks weaken the strategic alliance with China. This shift highlights a changing power balance and growing economic dependence.

=== Bilateral trade ===
China is India's second largest trading partner. In June 2012, China asserted that "Sino-Indian ties" could be the most "important bilateral partnership of the century", seemingly substantiated by current Prime Minister Narendra Modi's historic visit to China in May 2015. At that pivotal visit, Wen Jiabao, the Premier of China, and Manmohan Singh, the Prime Minister of India set a goal to increase Indo-Chinese bilateral trade to US$100 billion by 2015. At the India-China Business Forum in Shanghai, Modi claimed that China and India would pool together their manufacturing capabilities, citing initiative examples, such as building “50 million houses by 2022”, "develop[ing] smart cities and mega industrial corridors”, and refining FDI policy and modernizing railway systems together.

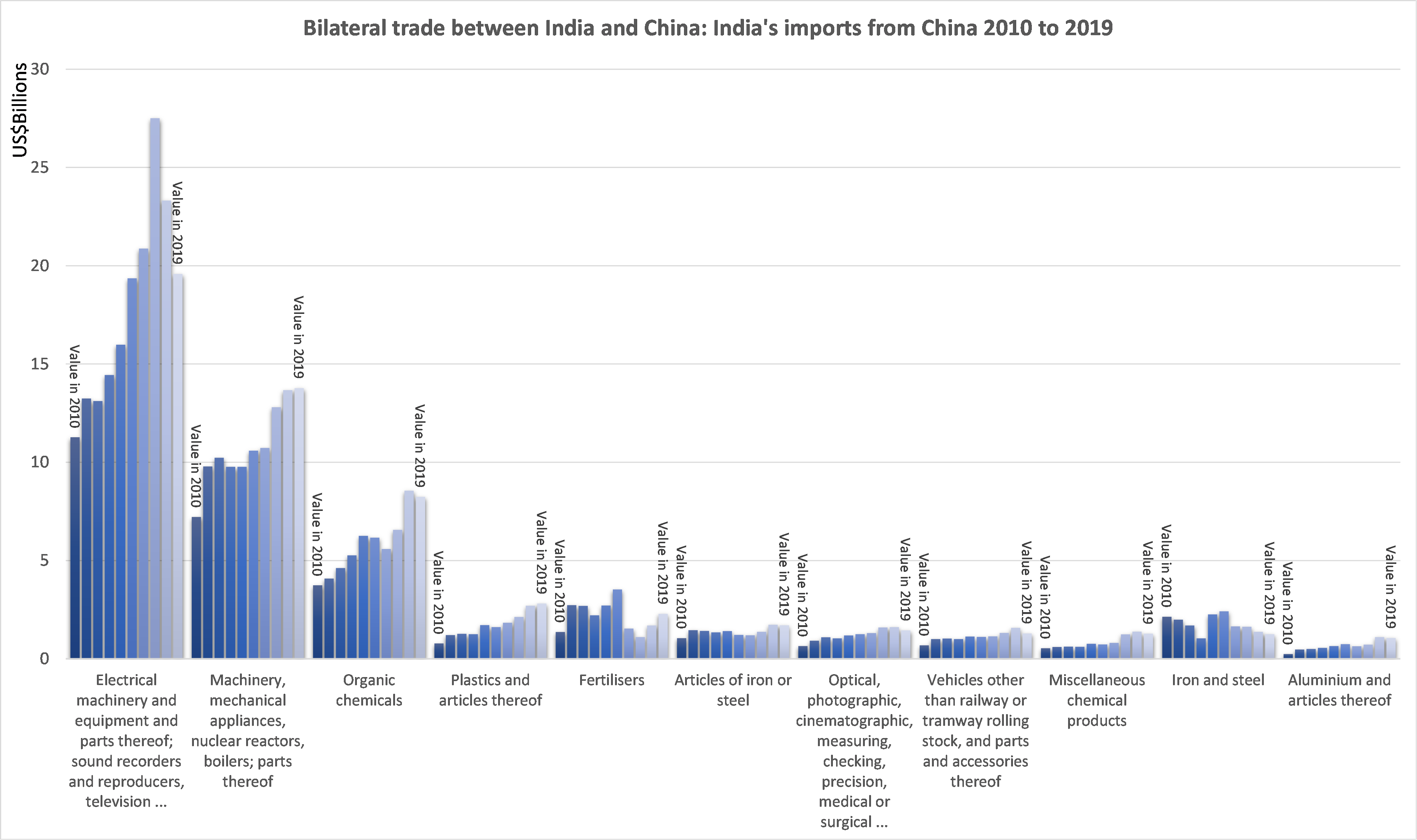
Bilateral trade between India and China. India's imports from China — 2010 to 2019.

Following that conference, bilateral trade between China and India touched US$89.6 billion in 2017–18, with the trade deficit widening to US$62.9 billion in China's favor. In 2017, the volume of bilateral trade between India & China stood at US$84.5 billion. This figure excludes bilateral trade between India and Hong Kong, which stands at another US$34 billion. Chinese imports from India amounted to $16.4 billion, or 0.8% of its overall imports, and 4.2% of India's overall exports in 2014. Major commodities exported from India to China were: cotton; gems, precious metals, coins; copper; ores, slag, ash; organic chemicals; salt, sulphur, stone, cement; machines, engines, and pumps. Chinese exports to India amounted to $58.4 billion, or 2.3% of its overall exports, which made up approximately 12.6% of India's overall imports in 2014. Major commodities exported from China to India were: electronic equipment; machines, engines, pumps; organic chemicals; fertilizers; iron and steel; plastics; iron or steel products; gems, precious metals, coins; ships, boats; medical and technical equipment.

In 2018, a Standing Committee on Commerce chaired by Naresh Gujral submitted a report on the 'Impact of Chinese Goods on Indian Industry.' The report pointed out insufficient implementation of existing anti-dumping laws, reliance on Chinese raw materials in sectors such as pharmaceuticals, reliance on Chinese imports in India's National Solar Mission, Goods and Services Tax on certain products resulting in increased imports from China, and Indian smart city administrations preferring Chinese bicycles over Indian ones. India imported $65.3 billion worth of goods from China in the fiscal year ended March 2020, and exported $16.6 billion, according to the commerce ministry.

In 2020, in a departure from the previous pledges of collaboration, Modi instituted bans on Chinese products, including both intangible apps (TikTok) and tangible goods (toys and furniture). Furthermore, the Modi administration created the Phased Manufacturing Program to encourage India-based cellphone assembly and manufacturing. Under guidance from this legislation and the accompanying task force to reduce import dependence, India raised import duties on electronic items produced in China, as well as a laundry list of ancillary goods.

According to a 2021 survey published in ThePrint, 43% of Indians did not buy ‘Made in China’ products since the Galwan clash the previous year. Modi also took notice of Swadeshi Jagran Manch's (SJM) campaigns, launching or reviving 220 out of 370 anti-dumping suits against Chinese items ranging from steels, pharmaceuticals, and chemicals.

Due to the international sanctions against Russia following the 2022 Russian invasion of Ukraine, Indian oil refiners started using Chinese yuan for payments of Russian oil imports as an alternative to the US dollar. The Indian government also does not welcome the use of yuan for payments by its companies. Indian automakers have faced shortages due to export restrictions of China's rare earth metals.

Due to rising trade tensions with the US such as the imposition of 50% tariffs over India's trade with Russia on the majority of Indian goods by President Donald Trump, which took effect in August 2025, India had a diplomatic shift strengthening its ties with China. By September 2025, visa issuances have resumed, and India had begun considering Chinese firms to hold 20% to 25% stakes in its manufacturing, renewable energy, and auto parts sectors. In December 2025, China filed a case against India with the World Trade Organization over tariffs.

The author argues that expectations of India emerging as a global power comparable to China have faded over the past decade. Despite early optimism after economic liberalisation, India did not industrialise or grow at a pace similar to China and remains relatively poor on a per-capita basis. As a result, India is no longer seen internationally as China's peer, and domestic political ambition has shifted toward regional rather than global competition. A second shift, the author says, is the erosion of India's democratic character. While elections remain largely competitive, civil liberties have declined, affecting free expression, religion, academia, civil society, and the rule of law. International assessments have downgraded India from a full democracy to a flawed or partly free system. The author concludes that both diminished economic ambition and democratic backsliding have become widely accepted realities in India.

India has eased restrictions on Chinese investments, aiming to attract foreign capital to support its economy, which is under pressure due to rising energy prices. The relaxation focuses on simplifying the approval process for investments, while maintaining safeguards for national security.

== Cultural relations ==
A famous quote from Hu Shih regarding ancient Sino-Indian ties, albeit in a critical context, was "India conquered and dominated China culturally for 20 centuries without ever having to send a single soldier across her border".

== Public opinion ==
According to a 2014 BBC World Service Poll, 23% of Indians viewed China positively, with 47% expressing a negative view, whereas 27% of Chinese people viewed India positively, with 35% expressing a negative view. A 2014 survey conducted by Pew Research Center had 39% of Indian respondents holding an unfavourable view of China compared to 31% holding a favourable view; 72% of the respondents were concerned that territorial disputes between China and neighbouring countries could lead to a military conflict. A survey published in 2026 by the Pew Research Center found that 23% of Indians had a favorable view of China, while 54% had an unfavorable view.

An Observer Research Foundation survey released in August 2021 of Indian youth found that 77% of respondents distrusted China, which was higher than any other country, including Pakistan. 86% also supported the government's decision to ban Chinese mobile apps. An August 2023 survey by Pew Research Center found that 67% of Indian respondents had an unfavorable view of China.

A 2008 poll from the Pew Research Center found that in China, views about India were mixed – 25% said India was a partner, while 24% said it was an enemy. In 2011, Vikas Bajaj of The New York Times found Chinese media rarely reported about India and general populace lacks awareness and expertise on Indian matters. A 2023 Tsinghua University survey found that 8% of Chinese respondents had a favorable view of India, 50.6% had an unfavorable view, and 41.5% had a neutral view.

== Resident diplomatic missions ==
of China in India

- New Delhi (Embassy)
- Kolkata (Consulate-General)
- Mumbai (Consulate-General)

of India in China

- Beijing (Embassy)
- Guangzhou (Consulate-General)
- Hong Kong (Consulate-General)
- Shanghai (Consulate-General)

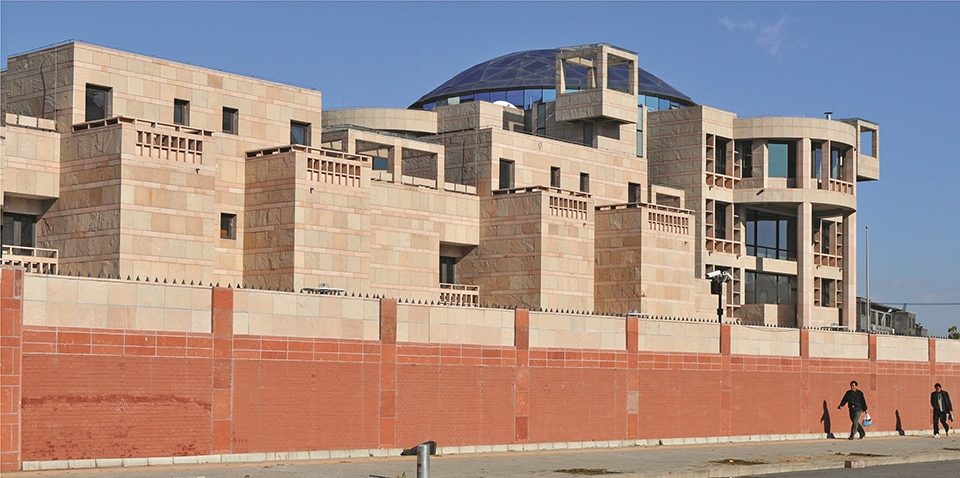
Embassy of India in Beijing

== See also ==
Bilateral and multilateral relations

- Chindian People of mixed Indian and Chinese ancestry
- BRICS – Brazil, Russia, India, China, and South Africa
- China in the Mahabharata
- Shanghai Co-operation Organisation (SCO)
- China's relations with Northeast India
- Bhutan–China relations
- Bhutan–India relations
- India–Hong Kong relations
- China Study Group
- India–Tibet relations
- Annexation of Tibet by the People's Republic of China
- Five Fingers of Tibet
- Act East policy (India)
- China-South Asia Expo

Border disputes

- Sino-Indian border dispute
- 2024 India-China Border Patrol Agreement
- Aksai Chin – controlled by China and claimed by India.
- Chinese salami slicing strategy
- Tawang District – controlled by India and claimed by China.
- Shaksgam Valley – controlled by China and claimed by India (Conferred to China in 1963 by Pakistan), Trans-Karakoram Tract.
- Bhutan–China border
