= Lekhan Thakkar =

Indian career civil servant and diplomat

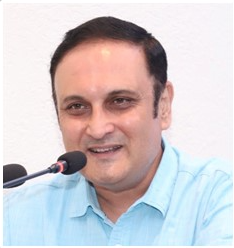

Personal details
- Born: 19 September 1970
- Spouse: Neeru Thakkar

Lekhan Thakkar is an Indian career civil servant and diplomat who currently serves as Joint Secretary to the Government of India in the National Security Council secretariat.

He previously served as Counsellor (Economic and Commerce) and is the Commercial Representative of India in Embassy of India at Beijing at People's Republic of China. He formerly served as Director to Government of India in Ministry of Finance and Executive Director for National Financial Reporting Authority.

He is a 1995 batch Central Secretariat Service officer.

== Early life and education ==
Thakkar was born to a Gujarati family. He earned a Bachelor of Commerce degree from South Gujarat University in 1991. He also is a qualified Chartered accountant by Institute of Chartered Accountants of India and also Institute of Cost Accountants of India.

He also earned Executive Masters in International Business from Indian Institute of Foreign Trade in 2003 and Master of Arts from Institute of Development Studies at University of Sussex in 2013.

== Career ==
Lekhan joined the Central Secretariat Service in 1995 after qualifying through the Civil Services Examination. He served as Under Secretary to Government of India in Ministry of Corporate Affairs. He recently served as Director to Government of India in the Department of Economic Affairs at Ministry of Finance. He also served as Director and later Vice President of Gujarat Urban Development Mission in Gandhinagar at Gujarat.

In 2020, Government of India led by Prime Minister Narendra Modi appointed Thakkar as Counsellor in Embassy of India at Beijing at People's Republic of China.

== Recognition ==
He is a non Indian Foreign Service officer to be appointed on a diplomatic rank to a diplomatic missions of India.

Order of precedence
Unknown	Order of Precedence of India as Joint Secretary to Government of India; 2023 to Current	Incumbent
