= Jairampur cemetery =

War cemetery in Arunachal Pradesh, India

Jairampur WW II Cemetery
- India
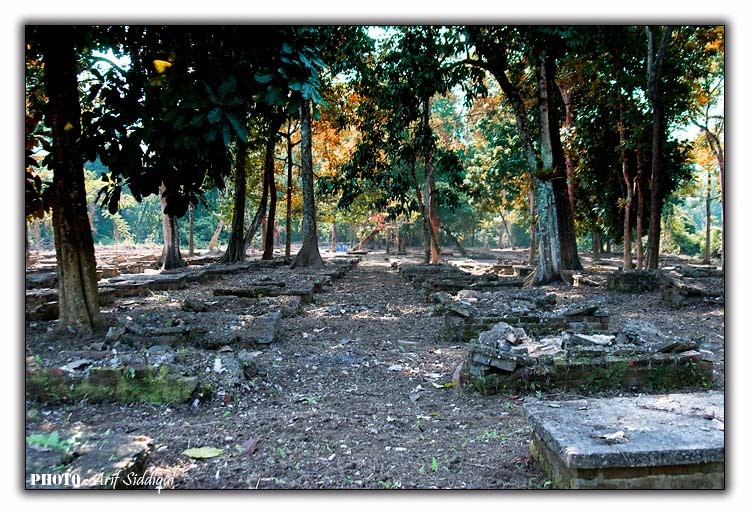
- Used for those deceased
- Location: 27.314722°N 96.0525°E near Jairampur, India

Burials by nation
- Chinese, Taiwanese, Indians, Kachins and British.

Burials by war
- World War II

Jairampur cemetery is a World War II cemetery in Arunachal Pradesh, India. It is located 7 km from Jairampur, Changlang district, and 25 km from Pangsau Pass, the Indo-Myanmar Border on the road to Ledo. It was discovered in 1997.

A signboard reads, "These graves bear silent testimony to those soldiers, unlisted workers and laborer's who ventured into virgin jungle amid blistering heat and laid down their lives in the line of duty during the second world war, whilst part of the All Forces against the Imperial Japanese Army."

The Department of Tourism, Government of Arunachal Pradesh is renovating the site.

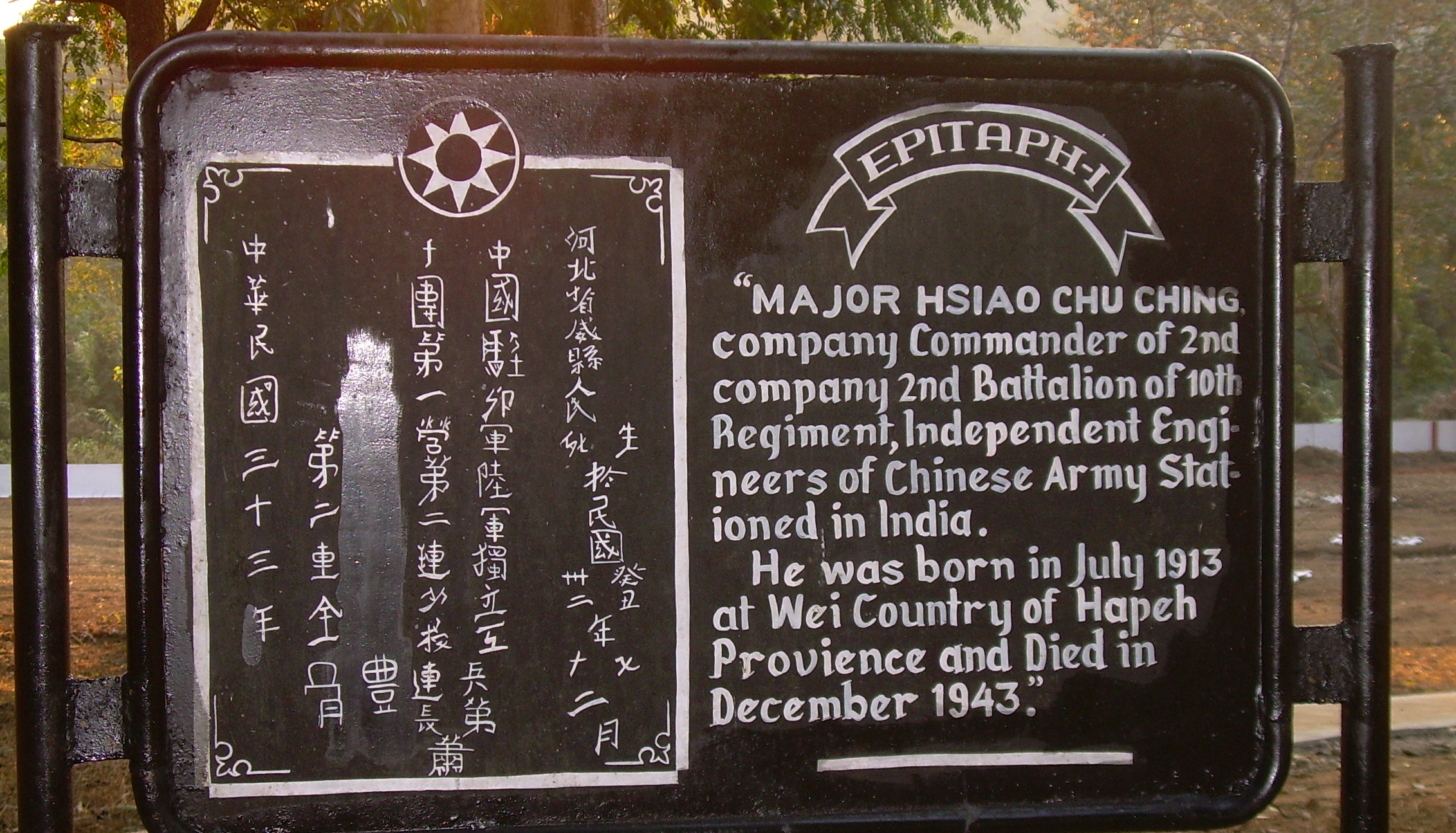
Epitaph of Major Hsiao Chu Ching
