= Kailash Mansarovar Yatra =

Tibetan pilgrimage site

Kailash Mansarovar Yatra कैलाश मानसरोवर यात्रा ཀཱའི་ལ་ཤ་མན་ས་རོ་ཝར་ཡ་ཏྲ།
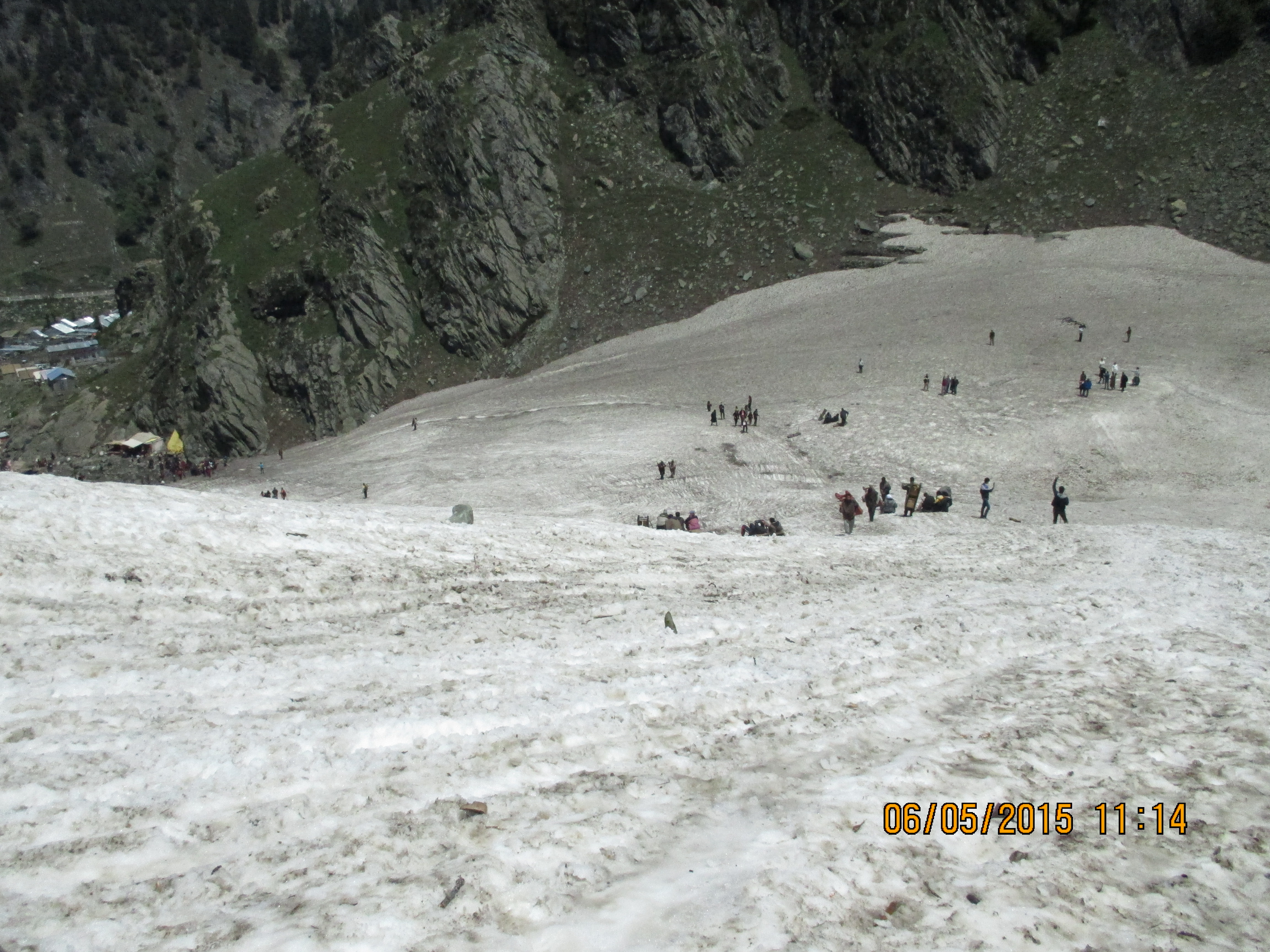
- Glacier at Chandanwadi, the first point to Kailash Mansarovar yatra
- Status: Active
- Genre: Religious pilgrimage
- Frequency: Annually
- Location: Tibet
- Country: China

Kailash Mansarovar Yatra (Hindi: Kailash Mansarovar Yatra, transl. Kailash-Mansarovar Pilgrimage) is a sacred pilgrimage to Mount Kailash and Lake Manasarovar, located in the Tibet Autonomous Region of China. Considered a spiritual journey of immense importance, it holds religious and spiritual significance for Hindus, Buddhists, Jains, and Bon followers. The pilgrimage involves traversing harsh terrains, high altitudes, and extreme weather, making it one of the most challenging pilgrimages in the world.

The yatra is organized annually by the Ministry of External Affairs of India in collaboration with the Government of China and attracts thousands of devotees despite the arduous journey. The pilgrimage is believed to cleanse one's soul of sins and offer liberation (moksha) to those who complete it.

== Geography ==
Mount Kailash is rising to an elevation of 6,638 m (21,778 ft) in the Himalayas. Its distinctive pyramid-shaped peak remains perpetually snow-clad, adding to its mystical allure. Lake Mansarovar located at 4,590 m (15,060 ft) is one of the highest freshwater lakes in the world and lies adjacent to the saline Lake Rakshastal.

== Religious significance ==
=== Hinduism ===
In Hinduism, Mount Kailash is revered as the abode of Shiva and Parvati. According to Hindu scriptures, it is believed that Shiva resides at the summit of Kailash in a state of perpetual meditation, making it the spiritual center of the universe. Lake Mansarovar is said to have been created by Brahma and is believed to purify the sins of those who bathe in its holy waters.

=== Buddhism ===
For Buddhists, Mount Kailash is known as Kang Rinpoche or "Precious Jewel of Snow." It is considered the dwelling place of Demchok (Chakrasamvara), a deity representing supreme bliss. Buddhists believe that circumambulating the mountain purifies negative karma and leads to enlightenment. Lake Manasarovar is associated with Anavatapta, a dragon lake mentioned in ancient Buddhist texts.

=== Bon religion ===
The indigenous Bon religion of Tibet considers Mount Kailash as the spiritual center where Tonpa Shenrab Miwoche descended from heaven. Bon followers circumambulate Mount Kailash counterclockwise, unlike followers of other religions.

== Pilgrimage Route and Circumambulation ==
=== Lipulekh Pass route ===
The Lipulekh Pass route begins at Dharchula in Pithoragarh district, Uttarakhand, and follows the Kali River gorge northeast through Tawaghat, Gala, and Budhi to Gunji (3,200 m (10,500 ft)), the last major settlement on the route. From Gunji, the route continues through Kalapani to Nabhidhang (4,266 m (13,996 ft)), the last camp on the Indian side before the pass. The Kumaon Mandal Vikas Nigam (KMVN) operates rest huts at camps along the route, including at Nabhidhang. Nabhidhang also serves as the principal viewpoint for Om Parvat, whose snow formation resembling the Om symbol is visible from the camp.

After an 8 km (5.0 mi) trek from Nabhidhang, pilgrims reach Lipulekh Pass (5,334 m (17,500 ft)) and enter Tibet. In 2020, the Border Roads Organisation (BRO) completed road connectivity from Dharchula to Lipulekh Pass. In 2023, BRO began construction of a 6.5 km (4.0 mi) road from the KMVN huts at Nabhidhang to Lipulekh Pass, along with a 'Kailash View Point' from which Mount Kailash would be visible from Indian territory.

The yatra through the Lipulekh route was suspended following the COVID-19 pandemic and had not resumed as of 2023.

=== Circumambulation (Kora/Parikrama) ===
Pilgrims cross the high-altitude Dolma La Pass (5,630 m / 18,471 ft), which is considered the toughest section of the route due to its steep ascent, thin air, and unpredictable weather.

- Dirapuk Monastery – The first stop after a 22-kilometer trek from Darchen.
- Dolma La Pass – The highest point of the trek, standing at 5,645 meters (18,520 feet).
- Zuthulphuk Monastery – The final leg of the circumambulation before returning to Darchen.

=== Lake Mansarovar Circumambulation ===
Devotees also perform a circumambulation of Lake Mansarovar, covering a distance of approximately 90 kilometers. Taking a holy dip in the lake and consuming its water is believed to absolve pilgrims of all sins.

== Diplomatic Sensitivities ==
The yatra has often been subject to diplomatic negotiations between India and China due to the sensitive border regions involved. Geopolitical tensions, such as the Doklam standoff in 2017, have led to temporary suspensions of the yatra, highlighting the delicate balance of international relations in the region. The yatra is set to resume in June 2025 after a gap of five years.

On 30 April 2026, the Ministry of External Affairs announced the resumption of the Kailash Mansarovar Yatra for 2026, to be conducted between June and August in coordination with China. The plan allowed 1,000 pilgrims, travelling in batches of 50, to use two routes: the Lipulekh Pass in Uttarakhand and Nathu La in Sikkim. The yatra had been suspended since 2020 due to the COVID-19 pandemic.

On 3 May 2026, Nepal's Ministry of Foreign Affairs formally objected to the use of the Lipulekh route, stating that Limpiyadhura, Lipulekh and Kalapani east of the Mahakali River are integral parts of Nepal under the Treaty of Sugauli, and that neither India nor China had consulted Kathmandu. India rejected the objection, with MEA spokesperson Randhir Jaiswal stating that the yatra had been conducted via Lipulekh since 1954 and that Nepal's claims were "neither justified nor based on historical facts and evidence". India described any unilateral enlargement of territorial claims as "untenable", while affirming openness to resolving outstanding boundary issues through dialogue.
