= Embassy of India, Beijing =

Diplomatic mission of India to China

Embassy of India, Beijing 印度驻华大使馆
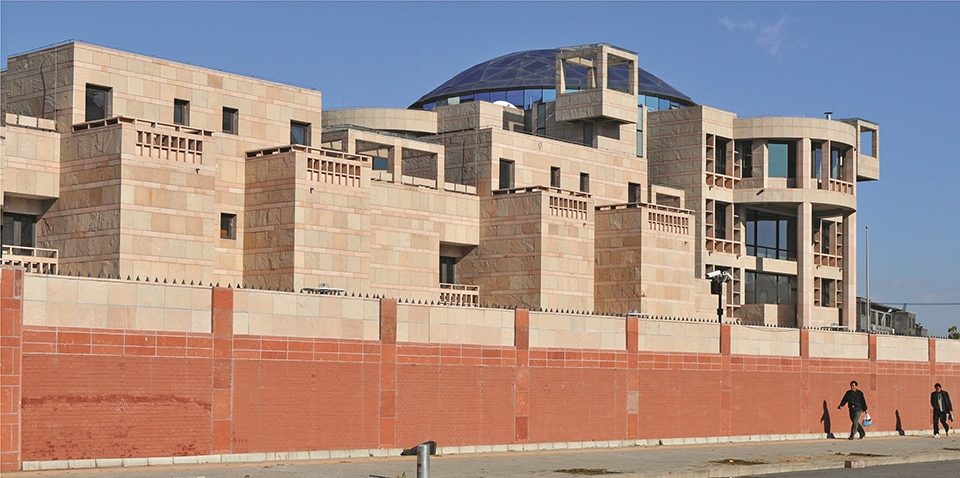
- Address: Liangmaqiao, Chaoyang District, Beijing, China
- Coordinates: 39°57′08″N 116°27′41″E
- Inaugurated: 8 February 2012
- Ambassador: Vikram Doraiswami
- Website: Official website

The Embassy of India (Hindi: भारतीय दूतावास, बीजिंग; simplified Chinese: 印度驻华大使馆; traditional Chinese: 印度駐華大使館; pinyin: Yìndù Zhùhuá Dàshǐguǎn) is located in the Liangmaqiao area of Chaoyang District, Beijing. The embassy is located within a US$10 million, 13,500-square-metre (145,000 sq ft) facility in proximity to various office buildings, the Embassy of the United States, and the Embassy of Israel. The embassy is commuted through Liangmaqiao subway station.

== History ==
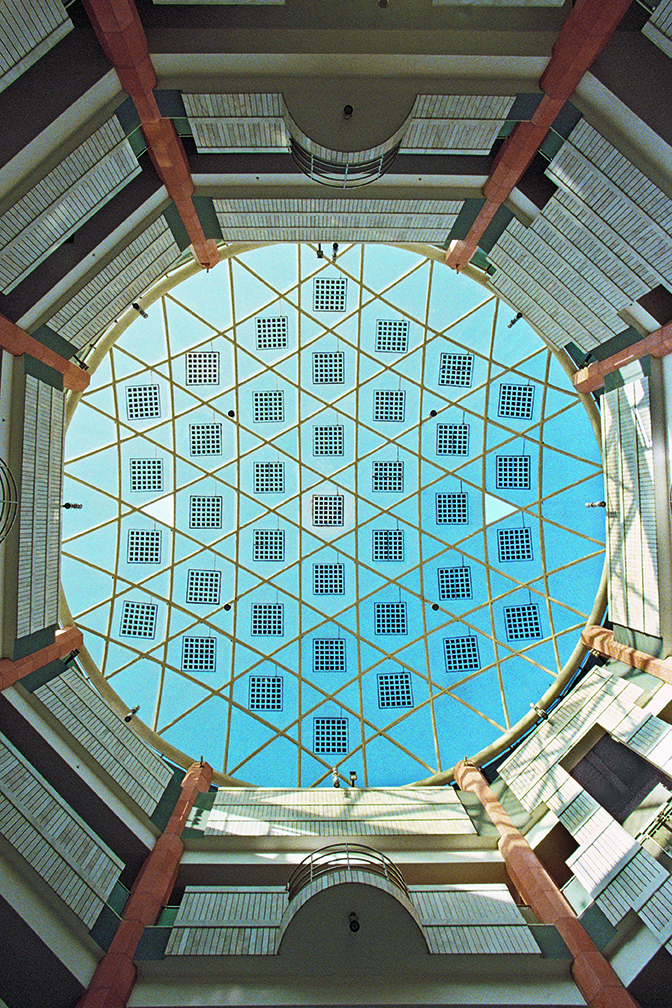
View of the atrium ceiling

The Indian mission originally occupied the Beijing Legation Quarter. The facility received damage during the Cultural Revolution. Around that period many diplomatic missions began moving to specified diplomatic enclaves. In 1969 the embassy moved to a location near Ritan Park in Chaoyang. The Ritan embassy, which the mission had moved into in 1969, was a wooden two-story structure. Ananth Krishnan of The Hindu said the old embassy was "old-fashioned and increasingly cramped". While the Ritan embassy operated, 29 diplomats, 28 Chinese employees, and 33 non-diplomat Indian employees worked in the embassy. The Indian government purchased a land site, which houses the current embassy, in 1989 for a 90-year lease for around US$1 million.

=== Current building ===
The current embassy opened in 2012. The inauguration ceremony occurred on Wednesday 8 February 2012. S.M. Krishna, the External Affairs Minister, attended the ceremony.

== See also ==
- China–India relations
- Foreign relations of China
- Foreign relations of India
- List of diplomatic missions of India
- List of diplomatic missions in China
