= 2024 India-China Border Patrol Agreement =

International agreement

2024 India-China Border Patrol Agreement was reached between India and China for easing the hostilities resulting from skirmishes between two countries in Galwan Valley. Both the countries suffered casualties of defence personnel during confrontation.

== Background ==
2024 India-China Border Patrol Agreement was an understanding reached between two countries to de-escalate tensions after the differences arose due to clash between two countries in Galwan Valley on 15 June 2020. The agreement is believed to ease the hostilities between the two countries.

The agreement has enabled both countries to take their patrolling as it was before year 2020.

== Buffer Zone ==
2024 India-China Border Patrol Agreement resulted in the creation of buffer zone between countries.

== Goals ==
The 2024 India-China Border Patrol Agreement was signed with the following objectives.

- Defusing four year differences over the border.
- Business interaction normalisation.
- Reducing confrontation at critical friction points.

== Patrolling restoration ==
2024 India-China Border Patrol Agreement restored the patrolling rights in Depsang Plains and Demchok region between mutual countries. The deal ensures each side is following the agreement for resuming the patrolling operations in the Ladakh region and underscores the respective territory claims of both countries.

== Challenges ==
2024 India-China Border Patrol Agreement faces challenges from both countries due to infrastructure and militarisation established by both countries.

== See also ==
- 2017 China–India border standoff
