= Hong Kong–India relations =

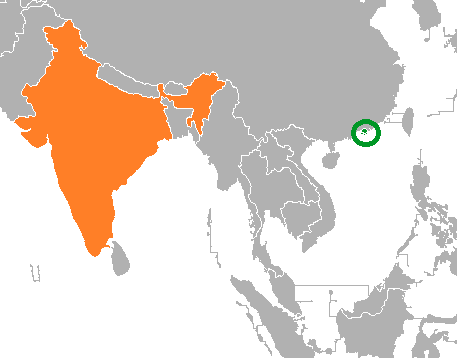
- Hong Kong: India

Hong Kong–India relations (Chinese: 印港關係) refers to the bilateral relations between India and Hong Kong. India has a consulate general in Hong Kong.

== History ==
Relations between Hong Kong and India date back to the 1840s when both were British colonies. Trade relations between Hong Kong and India were established shortly after the British gained control of Hong Kong in 1841. The Commission for India in Hong Kong was opened in 1951. The mission was renamed as the Consulate General of India on 15 October 1996, in preparation for the transfer of sovereignty over Hong Kong from the United Kingdom to China on 1 July 1997. Since 1999, the consulate is also concurrently accredited to Macau.

Hong Kong and India signed an agreement on reciprocal enforcement of judgements in 1968. The Indian Government re-notified the agreement in July 2012, to account for changes in the nomenclature of Hong Kong courts following the transfer of sovereignty. The two countries signed an Air Services Agreement in 1996, and an MoU on air services agreements in February 2012. Hong Kong and India signed a customs co-operation agreement and an agreement on surrender of fugitive Offenders in 1997, an agreement on Mutual Legal Assistance in Criminal Matters in September 2009, an agreement on transfer of sentenced persons on 20 January 2015.

There have been several high-level visits between the two. Chief Executive of Hong Kong Donald Tsang led a business delegation to India in October 2010. CY Leung was the first Chief Executive to make an official visit to India. At the invitation of Maharashtra Chief Minister Devendra Fadnavis, Leung led a 40 member business delegation to India on 2–5 February 2016. He held bilateral discussions with Prime Minister Narendra Modi, Finance Minister Arun Jaitley, and Foreign Minister Sushma Swaraj, and also addresses events organised by the Indian and Hong Kong chambers of commerce. Finance Minister Arun Jaitley, Gujarat Chief Minister Anandiben Patel and Telangana Chief Minister KCR Rao made visits to Hong Kong in 2016.

ICGS Sarang made a goodwill visit to Hong Kong in August 2015, and ICGS Samrat visited the country in October–November 2016. Indian Coast Guard officials held talks with officials from the Hong Kong Marine Police and Hong Kong Customs.

== Economic relations ==
The Hong Kong Monetary Authority (HKMA) and Reserve Bank of India (RBI) signed an MoU on Supervisory Cooperation and Exchange of Information on 17 July 2014. The Chairman of the India Trade Promotion Organisation (ITPO) visited Hong Kong on 4 October 2016. During the visit, an MoU to boost bilateral trade and commerce (particularly for small and medium enterprises) was signed between the ITPO and the Hong Kong Trade Development Council (HKTDC). Confederation of Indian Industry (CII) President Naushad Forbes led a CII delegation to Hong Kong in November 2016.

Several Hong Kong and Indian companies operate in each other's countries. Hong Kong firms such as China Light and Power (CLP), Li & Fung, Jardines, Shangri La, Kerry Logistics and Johnson Electric operate in India. As of December 2016, 11 public sector and 3 private sector Indian banks operate in Hong Kong. Air India maintains its regional office at Hong Kong.

Between April 2000 and September 2016, Hong Kong made a cumulative total foreign direct investment of $1.976 billion in India. Hong Kong was ranked as the 16th largest source of FDI inflows to India during that period.

=== Trade ===
Hong Kong is the fourth largest destination for India's exports, and is also a re-exporter of Indian goods to mainland China.

Bilateral trade totaled $26 billion in 2017, India exported $15 billion worth of goods to Hong Kong, and imported $11 billion. The main commodities exported by India to Hong Kong are pearls, precious and semi-precious stones, leather, electrical equipment, cotton, fish, crustaceans, machinery, apparel, organic chemicals, optical and medical instruments, and plastics. The major commodities imported by India from Hong Kong are pearls, precious and semi-precious stones, machinery, optical and medical instruments, clocks and watches, plastics, special woven fabrics, miscellaneous manufactured articles, organic chemicals and paper.

== Cultural relations ==
The Indian Council for Cultural Relations (ICCR) signed an MoU on "Establishment of the ICCR visiting professorship of Indian studies" with the Chinese University of Hong Kong on 4 September 2015.

== Migration ==
Indians began emigrating to Hong Kong in the mid-19th century. As of December 2016, around 45,000 Indians reside in Hong Kong about half of whom are Indian citizens. The community is primarily made up of Sindhis, Gujaratis and Punjabis. Indians have established some well-known institutions in Hong Kong such as the Hong Kong University, the Ruttonjee Hospital and the Star Ferry.

== Tourism ==
Hong Kong is a major destination for Indian tourists, with over 500,000 Indians visiting Hong Kong annually.

Cathay Pacific and Air India offers flights between Hong Kong, Delhi and Mumbai. Cathay Pacific also offers flights between Hong Kong and Chennai and Hyderabad and Bengaluru.
