= 2020–2021 China–India skirmishes =

Border conflict between China and India

- Part of the Sino-Indian border dispute
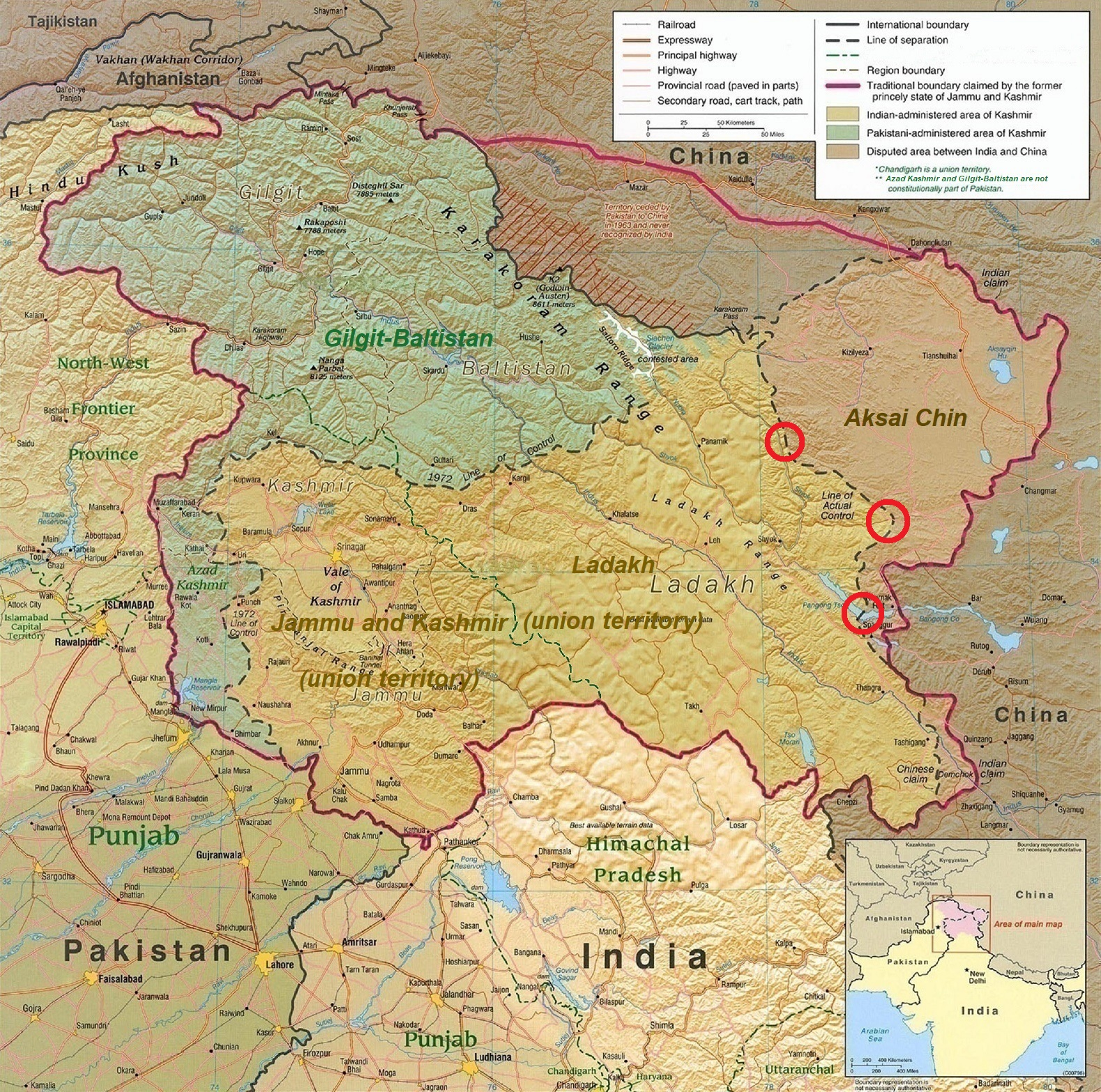
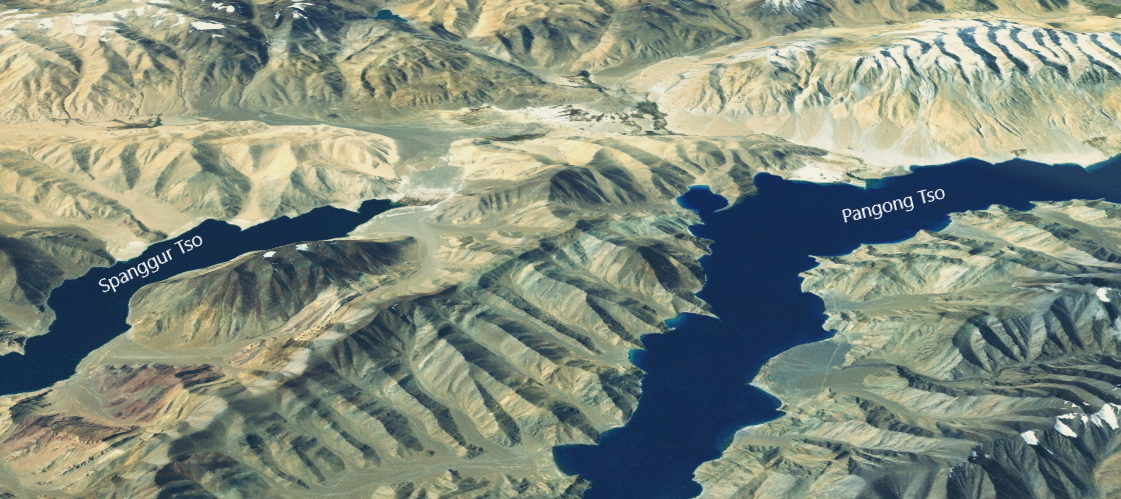
- A CIA map of Kashmir with red circles marking the rough locations of the conflicts near the Galwan Valley (top), Spanggur Tso and Pangong Tso (bottom). One section of the Pangong Tso-Chushul skirmish area along the LAC via NASA WorldWind.
Date	5 May 2020 – 20 January 2021 (8 months, 2 weeks and 1 day)
Location	Line of Actual Control (LAC), Sino-Indian border
Territorial changes	2,000 sq km of territory estimated to be lost by India.

Belligerents
India	China

Commanders and leaders
Narendra Modi; Rajnath Singh; Bipin Rawat; Manoj Mukund Naravane; Harinder Singh; P. G. K. Menon; Santosh Babu †	Xi Jinping; Li Keqiang; Wei Fenghe; Liu Lin; Chen Hongjun †

Units involved
Indian Armed Forces; Indian Army; Northern Command; Western Command; Central Command; Eastern Command; Indian Navy; Western Naval Command; Indian Air Force; Western Air Command; Indo-Tibetan Border Police; Special Frontier Force; Indian order of battle	People's Liberation Army; People's Liberation Army Ground Force; People's Liberation Army Air Force; Western Theater Command; People's Liberation Army Navy; Chinese order of battle

Strength
Line of Actual Control: 250,000 (29 June 2021)	Eastern Ladakh: 60,000 (3 January 2022)

Casualties and losses
Per India: 10 May 2020: 4 injured; 15 June 2020: 20 killed 76 injured (18 serious, 58 minor) 10 captured (released on 18 June); 20 January 2021: 4 injured	Per Independent sources: 15 June 2020: 35–45 killed; Per China: 15 June 2020: 4 killed, 1 injured; Per India: 10 May 2020: 7 injured; 15 June 2020: 25–40 killed, 60+ casualties Unconfirmed number captured (later released); 19 October 2020: 1 captured (later released); 9 January 2021: 1 captured (later released); 20 January 2021: 20 injured

Beginning on 5 May 2020, Chinese and Indian troops engaged in aggressive melee, face-offs, and skirmishes at locations along the Sino-Indian border, including near the disputed Pangong Lake in Ladakh and the Tibet Autonomous Region, and near the border between Sikkim and the Tibet Autonomous Region. Additional clashes also took place at locations in eastern Ladakh along the Line of Actual Control (LAC).

In late May, Chinese forces objected to Indian road construction in the Galwan river valley. According to Indian sources, melee fighting on 15–16 June 2020 resulted in the deaths of Chinese and Indian soldiers. Media reports stated that soldiers were taken captive on both sides and released in the coming few days while official sources on both sides went on to deny this. On 7 September, for the first time in 45 years, shots were fired along the LAC, with both sides blaming each other for the firing. Indian media also reported that Indian troops fired warning shots at the PLA on 30 August.

Partial disengagement from Galwan, Hot Springs, and Gogra occurred in June–July 2020 while complete disengagement from Pangong Lake north and south bank took place in February 2021. Following disengagement at Gogra in August 2021, Indian analysts pointed out that the LAC has shifted westwards at patrol point 17A (PP 17A).

Amid the standoff, India reinforced the region with approximately 12,000 additional workers, who would assist India's Border Roads Organisation in completing the development of Indian infrastructure along the Sino-Indian border. Experts have postulated that the standoffs are Chinese pre-emptive measures in responding to the Darbuk–Shyok–DBO Road infrastructure project in Ladakh. China has also extensively developed its infrastructure in these disputed border regions and is continuing to do so. The revocation of the special status of Jammu and Kashmir, in August 2019, by the Indian government has also troubled China. However, India and China have both maintained that there are enough bilateral mechanisms to resolve the situation. This includes multiple rounds of colonel, brigadier, and major general rank dialogue, special representatives' meetings, (Note: In 2003, during Prime Minister Vajpayee's visit to China, the Special Representatives mechanism for boundary dispute resolution was set up. Since then, the Special Representatives have had 22 rounds of talks till December 2019.) meetings of the 'Working Mechanism for Consultation and Coordination on China-India Border Affairs' (WMCC), (Note: According to ThePrint, "The WMCC is a joint secretary-level platform established in 2012 for border management between the countries and to share views on strengthening communication and cooperation, including between border security personnel.") and meetings and communication between their respective foreign and defense ministers. On 12 January 2022, the 14th corps-commander-level meeting at Chushul-Moldo Border Personnel Meeting (BPM) point took place. Following the Galwan Valley skirmish on 15 June, some Indian campaigns about boycotting Chinese products were started. Action on the economic front included cancellation and additional scrutiny of certain contracts with Chinese firms, and calls were also made to stop the entry of Chinese companies into strategic markets in India. By November 2020, the Indian government had banned over 200 Chinese apps, including apps owned by Alibaba, Tencent, Baidu, Sina, and Bytedance.

On 3 December 2024, Indian Union Minister of External Affairs S. Jaishankar announced in Lok Sabha that "disengagement has now been achieved in full in Eastern Ladakh".

== Background ==
The border between China and India is disputed at multiple locations. There is "no publicly available map depicting the Indian version of the LAC," and the Survey of India maps are the only evidence of the official border for India. The Chinese version of the LAC mostly consists of claims in the Ladakh region, but China also claims Arunachal Pradesh in northeast India.

China and India previously fought over the border in 1962 and 1967 with China gaining victory in the former and India gaining victory in the latter.

Since the 1980s, there have been over 50 rounds of talks between the two countries related to these border issues. Only 1 to 2 percent of border incidents between 2010 and 2014 had received any form of media coverage. In 2019, India reported over 660 LAC violations and 108 aerial violations by the People's Liberation Army which were significantly higher than the number of incidents in 2018. Despite the disputes, skirmishes, and standoffs, no incidence of gunshots being fired had been reported between the two countries along the border for over 50 years, due an agreement by both sides that guns were not to be used; however this changed on 7 September 2020, when warning shots were fired.

During Xi Jinping's visit to New Delhi in September 2014, Indian Prime Minister Narendra Modi discussed the boundary question and urged his counterpart for a solution. Since Modi became Prime Minister in 2014 until the 2020 standoff, Modi and Xi met 18 times, including those on the sidelines of summits and five visits to China. However, in 2017, China and India were involved in a major standoff in Doklam that lasted 73 days. On 3 January 2018, Xi Jinping, as Chairman of the Central Military Commission, issued the first Training Mobilisation Order. This was the first time that military training instructions had been given directly by the Chairman of the Central Military Commission. Following this, PLA forces have been mobilising training on the basis of the order.

A retired PLA major general explained that "China can't copy the US' measure to improve combat capability through actual combat overseas since our national defence policy is defensive rather than offensive. Therefore, military training becomes extremely important for China." China has since increased its military presence in the Tibetan Plateau.

== Causes ==
The disputed territory of the former princely state of Jammu and Kashmir is administered by Pakistan (green), India (blue) and China (yellow).

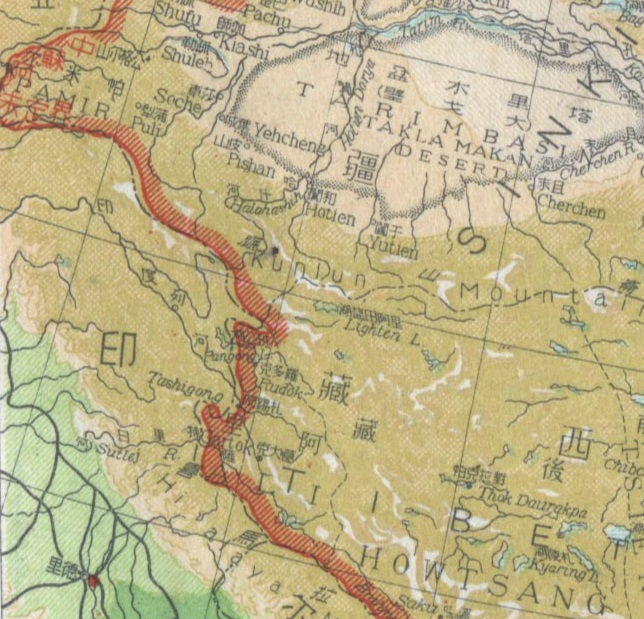
The Aksai Chin section of a 1947 map of Republic of China. All the clashes of the 2020–21 skirmishes have taken place outside these boundaries. (Note: Even though the map is of very low resolution, it is apparent that the Chip Chap River, a headwater of the Shyok River is shown entirely within Ladakh, as are the Depsang Bulge, Galwan Valley, Chang Chenmo Valley, the western half of the Pangong Lake and the Spanggur Lake. The Republic of China never claimed any of these territories. The present-day People's Republic of China expanded the territorial claims in 1960 and fought the 1962 war to enforce them.)

Multiple reasons have been cited as the trigger for these skirmishes. According to Mitch McConnell, US Senate Minority Leader, and Ashley Tellis, senior fellow at the Carnegie Endowment for International Peace, one reason is China's territory grabbing technique, also referred to as 'salami slicing', which involves encroaching upon small parts of enemy territory over a large period of time. In mid-June 2020, chairperson Urgain Chodon of Koyul–Demchok, stated that successive Indian governments (including the current Narendra Modi government) have neglected the border areas for decades and turned a "blind eye" to Chinese land grabbing in the region. According to her, India had failed in the protection of its borders, and even in 2020, all along the LAC, India had lost land. Other local Ladakhi leaders also acknowledged similar incursions by Chinese forces in the region. Also in mid-June 2020, BJP member of Parliament from Arunachal Pradesh Tapir Gao acknowledged the presence of regular Chinese patrols inside north-east India as well.

MIT professor, Taylor Fravel, said that the skirmishes were a response from China to the development of Indian infrastructure in Ladakh, particularly along the Darbuk–Shyok–DBO Road. He added that it was a show of strength for China amidst the COVID-19 pandemic, which had damaged the Chinese economy and its international reputation. According to Yun Sun, a China specialist at the Stimson Center, China perceived India's road-building as a threat to its "territorial integrity" which it will not sacrifice for the sake of good relations with India.

Lobsang Sangay, President of the Tibetan-government-in-exile, stated that China is raising border issues due to internal problems within China and the international pressure being exerted on China over COVID-19. Jayadeva Ranade, former National Security Advisory Board member, posited that China's current aggression in the region is to protect its assets and future plans in Ladakh and adjoining regions such as the China–Pakistan Economic Corridor.

Wang Shida of China Institutes of Contemporary International Relations linked the current border tensions to India's decision to abrogate Article 370 and change the status of Jammu and Kashmir in 2019. Although, Pravin Sawhney agreed with Wang, he postulated that a parliamentary speech by Amit Shah, the Minister of Home Affairs, also could have irked China. In the speech, Shah had declared that Aksai Chin, a disputed region administered by China, was part of the Indian-administered Ladakh Union Territory. Furthermore, the bifurcation of Jammu and Kashmir in 2019 prompted multiple senior Bharatiya Janata Party ministers, most recently in May 2020, to claim that all that now remained was for India to regain Gilgit-Baltistan. Indian diplomat Gautam Bambawale also agreed that New Delhi's moves related to Jammu and Kashmir irked Beijing.

Other analysts linked the skirmishes to India's growing alliance with the United States. Liu Zongyi, a South Asia specialist at the Shanghai Institute for International Studies told the Financial Times that "India has been active in many of US plans that target China". Tanvi Madan, author of Fateful Triangle (a book about the international relations between the US, India and China) stated that India thought that this was "signal from Beijing" to "limit" its relations with the US. Phunchok Stobdan, a former diplomat of India, stated that "smaller powers like India and Australia, who have aligned with the US, are witnessing a more aggressive China".

India's former ambassador to China, Ashok Kantha said that these skirmishes were part of a growing Chinese assertiveness in both the Indo-China border and the South China sea. Raja Mohan, Director of the Institute of South Asian Studies at the National University of Singapore, writes that the growing power imbalance between China and India is the main cause of the dispute, with everything else such as the location of the dispute or international ties of India, being mere detail. These skirmishes have also been linked by multiple people with the Chinese strategy of Five Fingers of Tibet. China has also been increasing its footprint with India's neighbours – Nepal, Sri Lanka and Pakistan; so from India having a monopoly in the region, China is now posing a direct challenge to New Delhi's influence in South Asia.

== Order of battle ==
April 2020 onwards divisions from the Western Theatre Command of PLA's Ground Force, the 4th (Highland) Motorised Infantry and 6th (Highland) Mechanised Infantry Divisions, moved units towards the LAC in eastern Ladakh reinforcing the existing deployment. The divisions stayed in eastern Ladakh from May 2020 to February 2021 following which they rotated with the 8th and the 11th Motorised Divisions. PLA Air Force and PLA Rocket Force deployed in support.

Post Galwan, there has been an overall increase in India's deployment against China in all three sectors— the northern, central and eastern sectors. Prior deployment by India directed towards China included 14 Corps based in Leh, 17 Corps and 33 Corps in Sikkim, and 3 Corps and 4 Corps in the eastern sector. Additions and changes have been made to this such as a proposed reorganising of the 14 Division, earmarked for fighting against Pakistan in the plains, into a mountain division for deployment in Himachal and Uttarakhand against China. India's paramilitary such as the Indo-Tibetan Border Police (ITBP) is deployed closer to the border at most locations, with the army holding line some kilometers behind them.

== Incidents ==
A June 2020 report from the Carnegie Endowment for International Peace said that there have been simultaneous efforts by China to occupy land at multiple locations along the Sino-Indian border. Standoffs, skirmishes and transgressions have taken place at Pangong Tso, Kugrang Valley (referred to as "Hot Springs" and "Gogra"), Galwan Valley, the Depsang Bulge area, Gurung Hill and Reqin La in Ladakh; and at one location in Sikkim. Amid de-escalatory talks in Ladakh, on 29 June 2020, China, opened a new front in the border dispute by claiming, for the first time, that Sakteng Wildlife Sanctuary is located in the disputed territory of Bhutan's Trashigang District. (Note: Sakteng does not have any contiguous border with China, and is only accessible through Bhutanese or Indian territory previously claimed by China.)

During late July and early August, reports emerged of PLA strengthening positions and accumulating troops at more locations other than Ladakh such as Uttarakhand's Lipulekh Pass, parts of north Sikkim, and Arunachal Pradesh. Following the Galwan valley clash, India deployed a warship to the South China Sea. The first border clash reported in 2021 was on 20 January, referred to as a minor border clash in Sikkim.

=== Pangong Tso ===
Northern shore of the Pangong Lake
with "fingers" – mountain spurs jutting into the lake (Note: The LAC displayed is that marked by the OpenStreetMap editors, said to reflect the Chinese maps.)

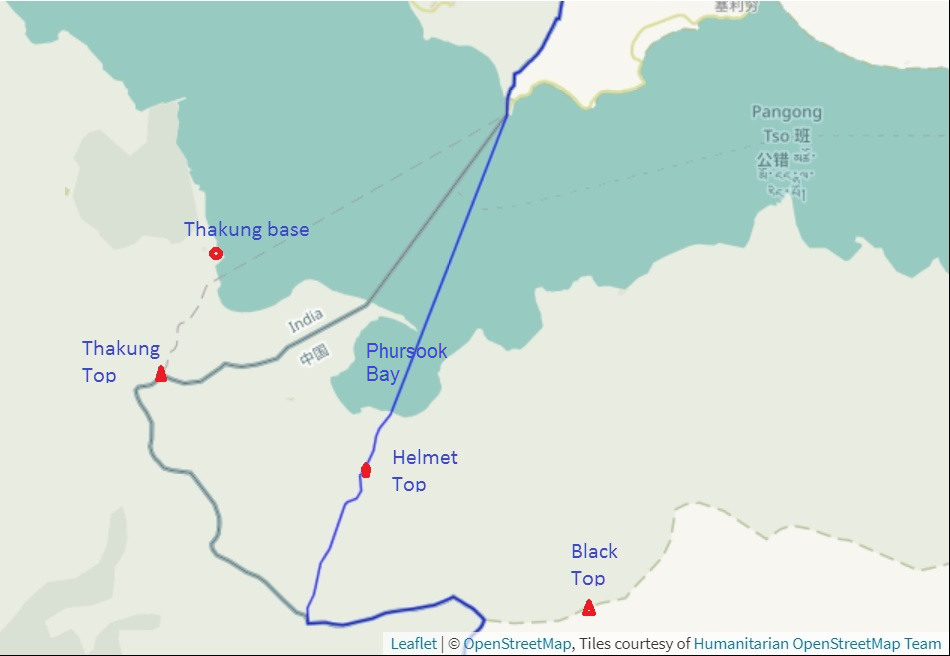
LAC on the southern shore of the Pangong Lake; the line marked by the US Office of Geographer in blue, the line marked by OpenStreetMap in green.

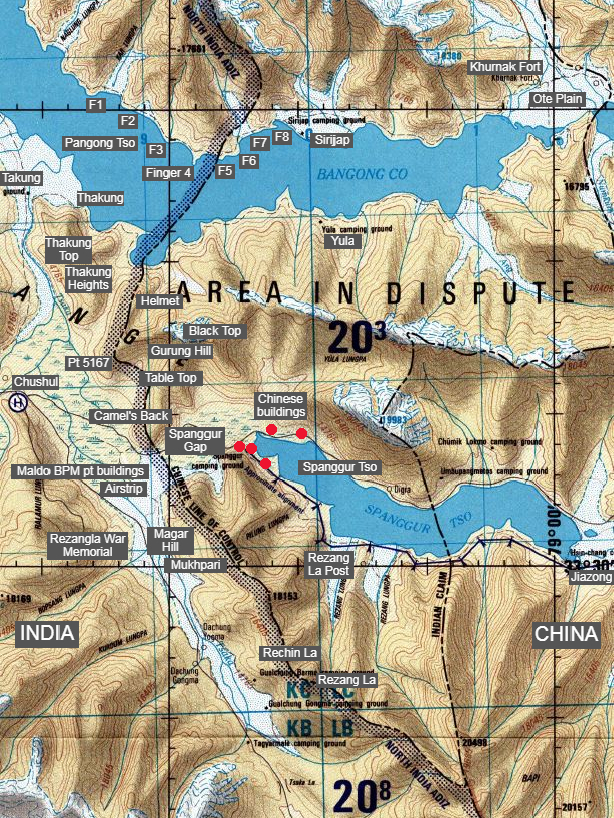
Fingers 1 to 8 visible on the north bank of Pangong Tso. On the south bank is Gurung Hill with features Helmet, Black Top, Table Top, Camel's Top. Chushul, Chushul/Maldo BPM point and airstrip, Magar Hill, Rechin La, Rezang La, Rezangla War Memorial, Spanggur Gap and Spanggur Tso, visible. Chinese and Indian claim lines (updated to 1992) marked. (Note: From map: "Boundary representation is not necessarily authoritative. Alignment of all boundaries is approximate.")

On 5 May, the first standoff began as a clash between Indian (Note: The Indian soldiers involved in the clash were from 17 Kumaon Regiment.) and Chinese soldiers at a beach of Pangong Tso, a lake shared between India and Tibet, China, with the Line of Actual Control (LAC) passing through it. A video showed soldiers from both nations engaging in fistfights and stone-pelting along the LAC. On 10/11 May, another clash took place. A number of soldiers on both sides had sustained injuries. Indian media reported that around 72 Indian soldiers were injured in the confrontation at Pangong Tso, and some had to be flown to hospitals in Leh, Chandi Mandir and Delhi. According to The Daily Telegraph and other sources, China captured 60 square kilometres (23 sq mi) of Indian-patrolled territory between May and June 2020. By the end of August it was reported that, according to the intelligence inputs given to the Indian Central Government, China has occupied 65 square kilometres (25 sq mi) in this area.

By 27 June, China was reported to have increased military presence on both the northern and southern banks of Pangong Tso, strengthened their positions near Finger 4 (contrary to what the status quo was in April), and had even started construction of a helipad, bunkers and pillboxes. Satellite imagery from between 12 and 26 June, by Planet Labs shows that the Chinese army increased infrastructure between Finger 4 and 5 on a massive scale, which includes tents, trenches, water tanks and stationed equipment and vehicles along with some camouflaged structures. The Planet Labs imagery also showed terrain inscribed with the Mandarin Chinese name of China, Zhongguo, along with the present-day map of China on the shore of the lake between Finger 4 and 5.

Both countries have multiple high powered boats for patrolling the Pangong Lake which is 13,900 feet above sea level. While the Indian Army already had multiple boat patrolling teams stationed, the Indian Navy, in July 2020, was called in to match the presence of the Chinese Type 928 B vessels at the lake. In the first week of September, according to Indian media reports citing a government official, "100 to 200 shots" were fired by both sides as "warning shots" on the north bank of Pangong Lake.

=== Chushul sector ===
On 29–30 August, the skirmishes expanded to the southern shore of Pangong Tso near the Ladakhi village of Chushul. An Indian Army spokesperson said that the PLA had made provocative military movements on the night of 29/30 August along the southern bank of Pangong Tso and that they were pre-empted by an Indian response which quickly moved to occupy higher terrain in a defensive move without any violence occurring. (Note: Reports suggest that India's Special Frontier Force were part of the events; the SFF consisted of Tibetan resistance fighters, and now Tibetans refugees and Gorkhas. The circumstances surrounding the death of the SFF Company leader Nyima Tenzin are unknown. Some reports suggest he was killed by a landmine with one other jawan also being injured.) The Indian Army repositioned its troops in the area as a precaution to prevent any future intrusion by the PLA. The Chinese Foreign Ministry spokesman Zhao Lijian denied any intrusion by PLA into Indian territory. Zhang Shuili, the Western Theater Command spokesman, accused Indian military of provocation and violating China's territorial sovereignty.

A brigade commander-level flag meeting was called to resolve issues. By 3 September 2020, Indian media reported that Indian troops had occupied many heights on the south bank of Pangong Tso. The heights mentioned include Rezang La, Reqin La, Black Top, Hanan, Helmet, Gurung Hill, Gorkha Hill and Magar Hill. Some of these heights are in the grey zone of the LAC and overlook Chinese camps.

On 4 September 2020, during the high-level meeting between China and India in Moscow, aggressive posturing was reported from Rechin La in the Chushul sector. PLA troops were also seen to be moving an anti-aircraft gun to Black Top. On 7 September 2020 at around 6:15 pm PLA troops tried approaching Indian positions at Mukhpari, as per Indian reports. Photos of PLA soldiers carrying spears, machete and rifles were released; this was the first publicly released photographic evidence of Chinese troops using such weapons. Indian soldiers who controlled the heights here used floodlights and megaphones to dissuade approaching PLA troops. Indian reports stated that it was then that PLA troops fired 10 – 15 rounds. However a spokesperson of the PLA claimed that Indian troops fired warning shots at the Chinese troops. The PLA Western Theatre Command spokesperson also claimed the Indian Army had crossed the LAC to enter the "Shenpao mountain region".

On 8 September both India and China blamed each other for firing warning shots. This is the first time in 45 years, since 1975 when Chinese opened fire on an Assam Rifles patrol in Tulung La in Arunachal Pradesh, that shots have been fired between India and China. Indian media also reported that Indian troops fired warning shots at the PLA on 30 August to prevent them from changing the status quo on the southern bank on Pangong Tso. Indian troops have put up barbed wire obstacles around positions.

Indian government sources denied occupying the features Helmet Top and Black Top. They stated that "any trajectory" was possible in going forward.

=== Sikkim ===
According to Indian media reports, on 10 May, there was a minor skirmish between Indian and Chinese troops in Muguthang, Naku La, Sikkim. The incident involved a brawl between scores of soldiers, with opposing sides also throwing stones at one another. A few soldiers from both sides were injured. (Note: Indian media, The Quint, reported that "one junior officer of Indian Army punched a Chinese PLA major and flattened him", according to "senior military officers in 33rd corps at Sikna covering Sikkim") A spokesperson from Indian Army's Eastern Command said that the matter had been "resolved after 'dialogue and interaction' at a local level" and that "temporary and short-duration face-offs between border guards do occur as boundaries are not resolved. Troops usually resolve such issues by using mutually established protocols". China did not share details about the incident, and the Chinese Ministry of Defense did not comment on the incident. However, the foreign ministry said that the "Chinese soldiers had always upheld peace and tranquility along the border".

=== Eastern Ladakh ===
Locations along the DS-DBO Road
(and the "traditional customary boundary" declared by China in 1960).

On 21 May, the Indian Express reported that Chinese troops had entered the Indian territory in the Galwan River valley and objected to the road construction by India within the (undisputed) Indian territory. The road under construction is a branch of the Darbuk–Shyok–DBO Road (DSDBO) which leads into the Galwan valley. (Note: The Darbuk–Shyok–DBO Road (DSDBO) is the first border road constructed by India in the Shyok River valley. Starting in 2000, it was completed recently in April 2019. China already has numerous roads crisscrossing Aksai Chin. In addition to the national highway G210, there is S519 that connects Kongka La to G210, S520 that connects Kongka La to Rutog via Pangong Tso, Tianwendian Highway that connects the Tianwendian post G210, a "Tiankong" Highway between Tianwendian and Kongka La, and a new Galwan Highway that connects Tiankong to the Galwan Valley right up to the Line of Actual Control.) The report also stated that "the Chinese pitched 70–80 tents in the area and then reinforced the area with troops, heavy vehicles, and monitoring equipment." On 24 May, another report said that the Chinese soldiers invaded India at three different places: Hot Springs, Patrol Point 14, and Patrol Point 15.

At each of these places, around 800–1,000 Chinese soldiers reportedly crossed the LAC and settled at a place about 2–3 km (1–2 mi) from the border, pitching tents and deploying heavy vehicles and monitoring equipment. The report added that India also deployed troops in the area and stationed them 300–500 metres (984–1,640 ft) from the Chinese troops. The EurAsian Times stated that the Chinese forces "have a huge build-up including military-style bunkers, new permanent structures, military trucks, and road-building equipment". On 30 May, Ajai Shukla reported that thousands of Chinese soldiers were "consolidating their positions," and that there were 18 guns at Pangong Tso and about 12 guns in the Galwan valley. Indian troops had taken up positions to block any further advance by the PLA towards the DSDBO Road.

On 27 May 2020, the Chinese Ambassador to India as well as a Chinese Foreign Ministry spokesman stated that the overall situation was stable. However, news reports continued stating that thousands of Chinese soldiers were moving into the disputed regions in Ladakh. This move prompted India to deploy more troops. Chinese infrastructure development was also reported in Gogra–Hot Springs. Tracks in satellite imagery suggest that PLA troops make forays into Indian territory here.

==== Galwan Valley clash ====
Galwan River at the Line of Actual Control

On 15 June, at patrolling point 14, Indian (Note: "The June 15 clash involved personnel from 16 Bihar, 3 Punjab, 3 Medium Regiment and 81 Field Regiment.") and Chinese troops clashed for six hours in a steep section of a mountainous region in the Galwan Valley. The immediate cause of the incident is unknown, with both sides releasing contradictory official statements in the aftermath. Beijing said that Indian troops had attacked Chinese troops first, while on 18 June The Hindu quoted a "senior government official" in the Ministry of External Affairs of India who said their troops were ambushed with dammed rivulets being released and boulders being thrown by Chinese troops. The statement said this happened while they were patrolling a disputed area where Colonel B. Santosh Babu had destroyed a Chinese tent two days earlier.

While soldiers carry firearms, due to decades of tradition designed to reduce the possibility of an escalation, agreements disallowed usage of firearms, but the Chinese side was reported to possess iron rods, clubs and batons wrapped in barbed wire and clubs embedded with nails. Hand-to-hand combat broke out, and the Indian soldiers called for reinforcements from a post about 3.2 kilometres (2 mi) away. Eventually, up to 600 men were engaged in combat using stones, batons, iron rods, and other makeshift weapons. The fighting, which took place in near-total darkness, lasted for up to six hours. The Defence Ministry of India said in its 2020 year end review that China used "unorthodox weapons".

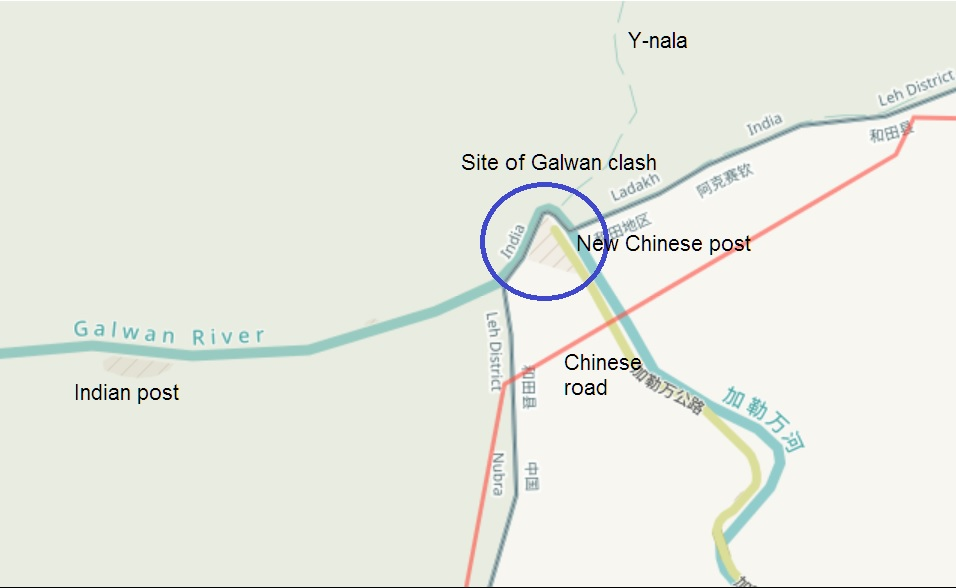
The site of Galwan clash at the river bend. Also seen are the LAC claimed by China June 2020 in green, and the prevailing LAC marked by the US Office of the Geographer in red

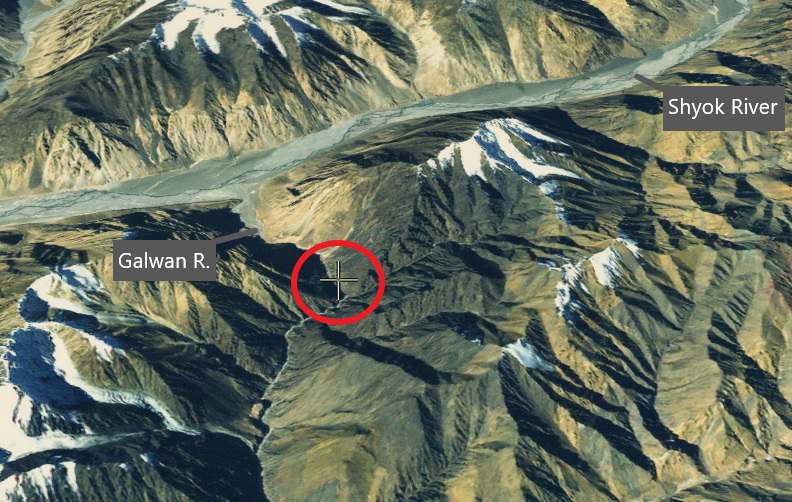
The site of the Galwan clash via NASA WorldWind

The fighting resulted in the deaths of 20 Indian soldiers, including 16th Bihar Regiment commanding officer Colonel Santosh Babu and Junior Commissioned Officer Nuduram Soren VrC (Note: Soren was posthumously awarded India's third highest war-time military decoration, Vir Chakra.) While three Indian soldiers died on the spot, others died later due to injuries and hypothermia. Most of the soldiers who were killed fell to their deaths after losing their footing or being pushed off a ridge. The clash took place near the fast-flowing Galwan River, and some soldiers from both sides fell into a rivulet and were killed or injured. Bodies were later recovered from the Shyok River. Several Indian news outlets stated that at least 10 Indian soldiers, including 4 officers, were taken captive and then released by the Chinese military on 18 June.

According to Gen V. K. Singh, an unconfirmed number of Chinese soldiers were also captured and later released by India. Some Indian soldiers had also been momentarily taken captive. According to Indian media sources, the mêlée resulted in 43 Chinese casualties. Per media reports based on sources, the Chinese side accepted a de-escalation meeting following the incident; a Chinese commanding officer was also killed in the mêlée. The Chinese defence ministry confirmed the existence of Chinese casualties but refused to share the number. Reports emerged on Chinese internet that five Chinese soldiers died on 16 June, but the report was subsequently censored by the Chinese government. On 22 June, when asked about an Indian minister's assertion about the number of Chinese casualties, China declined to comment.

Two days later on 24 June a Chinese spokesperson responded and called the remark from the Indian minister 'misinformation'. US intelligence reported that the PLA suffered 35 casualties. (Note: Sources disagree. Most sources list 35 casualties while one source claimed 35 death.) Indian media reported that 10 Indian soldiers were released from Chinese custody on 17 June, including four officers. Responding to the reports, the Indian Army and the Chinese Foreign Ministry have both denied that any Indian personnel was taken into custody. On 19 February 2021, the Central Military Commission of China stated that four of its soldiers were posthumously awarded for their actions during the June 2020 clash with India at Galwan.

On 16 June, Chinese Colonel Zhang Shuili, spokesperson for the PLA's Western Command, said that the Indian military violated bilateral consensus causing "fierce physical confrontations and casualties", and that "the sovereignty over the Galwan Valley area had always belonged to China". On 18 June, India's Minister of External Affairs made a statement saying that China had "unilaterally tried to change the status quo" and that the violence was "premeditated and planned". The same day, the United States Assistant Secretary of State for East Asian and Pacific Affairs said that the Chinese PLA had "invaded" the "contested area" between India and China.

On 19 June, however, Prime Minister Modi declared that "neither have [China] intruded into our border, nor has any post been taken over by them", contradicting multiple previous statements by the Indian government. Later the Prime Minister's Office clarified that the Indian Prime Minister wanted to indicate the bravery of 16 Bihar Regiment who had foiled the attempt of the Chinese side. On 22 June, U.S. News & World Report reported that US intelligence agencies have assessed that the chief of China's Western Theater Command, Gen. Zhao Zongqi, had sanctioned the skirmish. In the aftermath of the incident at Galwan, the Indian Army decided to equip soldiers along the border with lightweight riot gear as well as spiked clubs.

On 20 June, India removed restriction on usage of firearms for Indian soldiers along the LAC. Satellite images analysed by the Australian Strategic Policy Institute show that China increased construction in the Galwan valley since the 15 June skirmish. The Chinese post that was destroyed by Indian troops on 15 June was reconstructed by 22 June, with an expansion in size and with more military movement. Other new defensive positions by both Indian and Chinese forces have also been built in the valley.

==== Depsang area ====
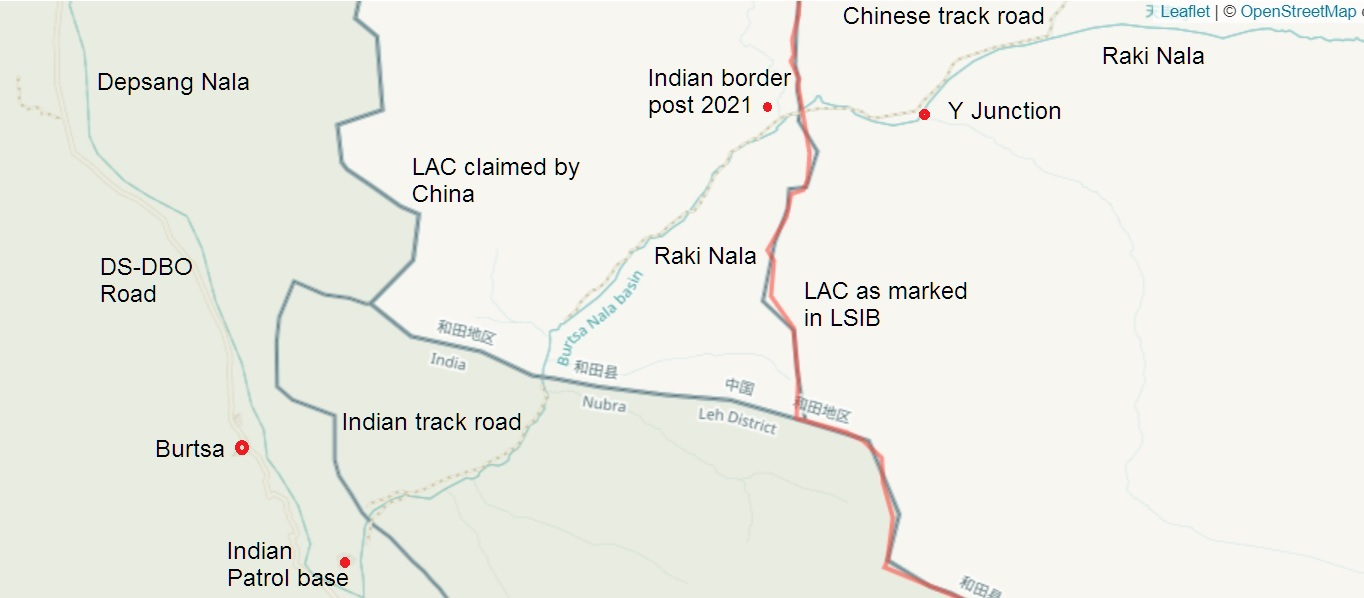
The LAC across the Depsang Bulge; the prevailing LAC in red and the Chinese claims in green

India–China tension in the Depsang area started months before the May 2020 standoff. Chinese presence, 18 km (11 mi) inside the Indian perception of the LAC, near the Y-junction or Bottleneck on Burtsa Nala valley, (Note: The Burtsa Nala originates in Aksai Chin plains and flows west into Ladakh, where it is joined by the Depasng Nala near Burtsa. Its valley was also the site of the 2013 Depsang standoff.) was reported by Indian media on 25 June 2020. The reports described movement of troops, heavy vehicles and military equipment. The Chinese claim lines are 5 km further west of bottleneck. Indian Patrol Points (PP) 10, 11, 11A, 12 have been blocked by PLA movement and construction at the Y-junction since March–April 2020. Intelligence inputs on 31 August 2020 put the Chinese control of territory within the India's perception of the LAC at about 900 square kilometres (350 sq mi).

=== Ongoing construction of infrastructure ===
China and India have both been constructing infrastructure along the borders aimed at augmenting strategic capabilities. This includes infrastructure in the Indo-Pacific region. Following Chinese announcements of more dam construction on the Brahmaputra River, India said that it would need to build a dam along the river to mitigate the negative effects of the Chinese dam construction. This construction has continued throughout 2020 and 2021.

India

Amid the standoff, India decided to move approximately 12,000 additional workers to border regions to help complete Indian road projects. Around 8,000 workers would help Border Roads Organisation's (BRO) infrastructure project, Project Vijayak, in Ladakh while some workers would also be allocated to other nearby border areas. The workers would reach Ladakh between 15 June and 5 July. The first train with over 1,600 workers left Jharkhand on 14 June 2020 for Udhampur, and from there the workers went on to assist BRO at the Sino-Indian border. Apart from completing the DS–DBO Road the workers would also be assisting the BRO in the construction of other border roads.

Starting from June, the government announced up to 170% increase in minimum wages for those working along the India–China border, with the highest increase in wages going to employees in Ladakh. Experts state that the development of Indian infrastructure along the border was one of the causes for the standoffs. LiveMint reports "that while such asset creation might be adding to India's strategic capital, it is not furthering its human capital the same way." India has also installed surveillance equipment along the LAC. In October 2021, environmental clearance was given for the construction of new border outposts, including at locations where tensions with China have increased. At the end of 2021, India inaugurated a number of border roads and bridges, including the Umling La section of the Chisumle–Demchok road.

China

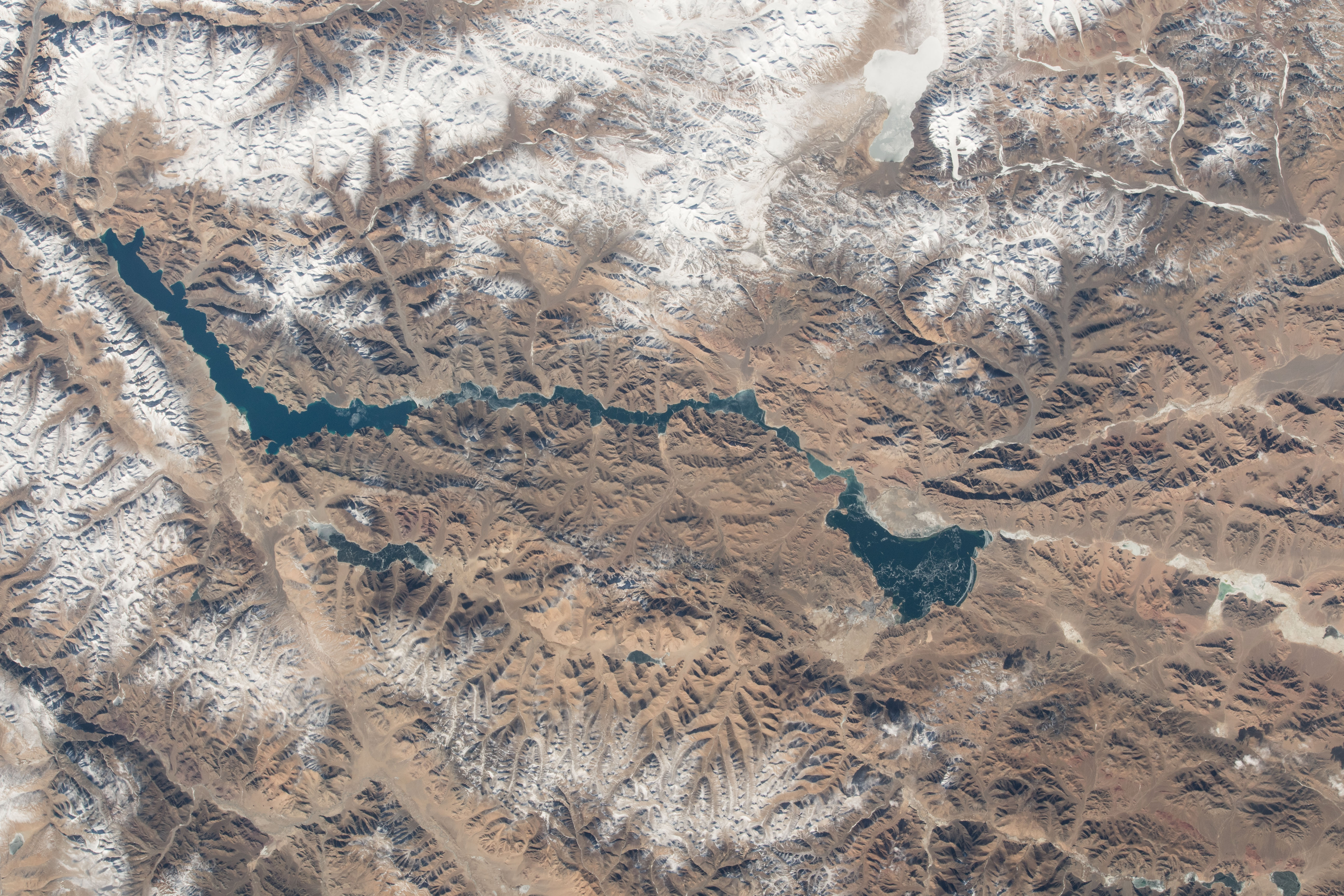

1 / New bridge

Throughout the standoff China continued to build infrastructure near the LAC. Infrastructure includes roads, bridges, helipads and other military infrastructure such as camps. Optical fibre cables are being laid for its frontline troops at the faceoff sites in Pangong Tso and Gogra-Hot Springs area. Two new marinas at Pangong Tso have also been built. China has installed cameras, motion sensors and other surveillance equipment along the LAC. Airbases in Xinjiang and Tibet are being further developed; this includes airbases at Hotan, Kashgar, Gargunsa, Lhasa-Gonggar and Shigatse.

At Kailash-Mansarovar, near the Lipulekh pass, China is building a surface-to-air missile site. China is also developing a 5G network for its troops along the LAC. Reports of China deploying satellite jammers along the border was also reported. In July, Stratfor reported that the Chinese military had built 26 new temporary barracks and 22 new bases along the Indian border; "a mix of permanent and semi-permanent positions". In September, Stratfor reported that since the beginning of the standoff, the construction of four new heliports has started. The report by Sim Tack notes that this buildup by China in the Himalayas is similar to Chinese strategy in the South China Sea, a strategy that considerably increases the cost for those trying to oppose China's claims.

In November, China reportedly constructed the village of Pangda 2 km within Bhutan's territory and 9 km from the 2017 Doklam standoff site, to which the Bhutanese ambassador to India responded with "there is no Chinese village inside Bhutan." New Chinese ammunition bunkers were also reported 7 km from the 2017 site. A few weeks later, reports emerged of China having constructed three villages near Bum La Pass. Lying within Chinese territory, the villages were reportedly being constructed while Chinese and Indian soldiers face off in eastern Ladakh. This was followed by reports in January 2021 of the construction of another village in disputed territory along the border in Upper Subansiri district. Another new Chinese enclave (supposedly) in Arunachal's Shi Yomi district was reported in November 2021. During the standoff, China started building a bridge across the Pangong lake.

The new village is located between Longju and Maja. (Note: The border is the Line of Actual Control between China and India as marked by the contributors to the OpenStreetMap.) Longju is in Indian territory according to Indian claims, occupied by the Chinese since 1959. (Borders present/missing as per OSM editors)

=== Logistics ===
Following unsuccessful diplomatic talks and stalled military disengagement and de-escalation process, China and India prepared themselves to maintain sustained deployment in Ladakh throughout the winter. (Note: "... since 1984 till late 2019, some 869 soldiers had died on the Siachen Glacier spread across 76 km at heights above 17,700 feet due to climatic conditions, analogous to portions of the LAC stretch ...") Temperatures in parts of Aksai Chin and Ladakh, a high altitude cold desert, drop as low as −40 °C. While some areas of the region see heavy snowfall, eastern Ladakh sees winds of up to 60 kmph. Shyok River in Pangong Tso freezes, as does water in pipes.

A large part of the logistical requirements on the Indian side is in the form of fuel, oil and lubricants (FOLs). Oil is used for firing bukharis and cooking food as well as melting snow for drinking water and for barracks with heating systems. Arctic tents and winter clothing have been stocked. Nutritional requirements are met through provisions including 22 types of rice, pulses and wheat, 65 necessary food items, perishables such as vegetables; and high-calorie foods for deployment of 18,000 feet (5,500 m) and above. A single soldier requires approximately 800 kg of provisions to last through winter. Arms and ammunition have been stockpiled.

Local resources in Ladakh are limited, so everything comes from the plains. Extra engineering forces have been tasked with providing additional barracks for the troops; by mid–November it was reported that the army has completed the construction of "habitat facilities" in Ladakh. According to former Army Deputy Chief of Staff, Lieutenant General J.P. Singh, winter deployment along the LAC will financially bleed India by forcing construction of new infrastructure, recurring expenses such as additional truck and aircraft movement, and purchase of off-the-shelf winter equipment; in turn affecting other expenses such as modernisation plans. (Note: An hour long flight to the LAC costs ₹24 lakh (equivalent to ₹31 lakh or US$33,000 in 2026) while 45 minutes of helicopter movement in the border areas costs around ₹4 lakh (equivalent to ₹5.1 lakh or US$5,500 in 2026). Major General A P Singh, former head of logistics of XIV Corps, says that for one year the minimum cost of maintaining one soldier along the LAC is ₹10 lakh (equivalent to ₹13 lakh or US$14,000 in 2026).)

Amidst the standoff, India completed military logistics sharing agreements with partners in the Quad—Japan, Australia and United States. DRDO has developed a number of products for troops in Ladakh such as a new buhkari called Him Tapaak. There has been considerable delays of several years in construction of border outposts for the ITBP.

The People's Daily reported that the PLA has been constructing new infrastructure for the winter, such as pre-fabricated shelters, and conducting drills using drones to deliver hot meals to frontline troops. China is also seeking to set up military logistics facilities in Pakistan, Sri Lanka and Myanmar.

=== War of attrition ===
Reports citing Indian army sources point to the daily attrition due to the heights and cold. This attrition is "within the expected ratio" (Note: Till the 2010s, the attrition rate was around 20%. In the 1962 war there were "nearly equal number of casualties suffered by the Indians were weather casualties".) and those who recover are redeployed. The Chinese side faces similar situations. Commentators are pointing out that this is becoming or has already become a war of attrition; this includes Yun Sun, a China specialist at the Stimson Center, and Srikanth Kondapalli, a professor of Chinese studies at JNU. Other border forces such as the Indo-Tibetan Border Police (ITBP) also face attrition related challenges.

=== Cyber attacks ===
Following escalation in 2020, reports of cyber attacks increased. The Maharashtra cyber department suspected that a severe blackout in Mumbai on 13 October 2020 was caused by a malware attack. A February 2021 study by cybersecurity firm Recorded Future found that Chinese malware flowed into Indian electricity supply control systems after the skirmishes in 2020, though it did not validate a link between the malware and Mumbai power outage. At least 12 government organisations, mainly power utilities, were reported to have been attacked.

== Casualties and losses ==
Casualties and losses (including captured)
Date	Indian casualties	Chinese casualties				
Date	Per India	Per China	Per India	Other sources		
Date	Per India	Per China	Per India	US	Russia	Australia
10 May 2020	4 injured		7 injured			
15 June 2020	20 killed (official statement); 76 injured (18 serious, 58 minor injuries); 10 captured (released on 18 June)	4 killed and 1 injured (official)	25–40 killed, 60+ casualties Unconfirmed captured (later released)	20–35 killed (per US Intelligence)	45 killed (per a TASS, Russian state news agency report on 10 February 2021) rejected by a Russian Ministry of Foreign Affairs official. On 18 February 2021 Russian diplomat Timur Chernyshov relayed via Twitter to former BBC journalist Aadil Brar that TASS's figure was not its own estimate but copied from an unverified Indian estimate and it had copied casualty figures repeatedly from Indian media such as Indian news agency ANI in 2020 including an instance on 17 June. TASS acknowledged copying a figure of 45 dead from claims made by Indian authorities and Indian military on 20 June 2020, 2 July 2020, 6 July 2020, 31 August 2020. TASS also acknowledged copying an unverified claim of 43 dead by Indian news agency ANI on 17 June 2020.	At least 41 fatalities (Note: 38 drowned, including Junior Sergeant Wang Zhuoran.; 3; PLA Battalion Commander Major Chen Hongjun, Private Chen Xiangrong and Junior Sergeant Xiao Siyuan; killed by Indian forces.; Unknown number of soldiers, claimed to be numerous, who were pushed or fell to their deaths over steep cliff edges.) (per The Klaxon, Australian investigative newspaper)
19 October 2020			1 captured (later released)			
9 January 2021			1 captured (later released)			
20 January 2021	4 injured		20 injured			

== Diplomatic response ==
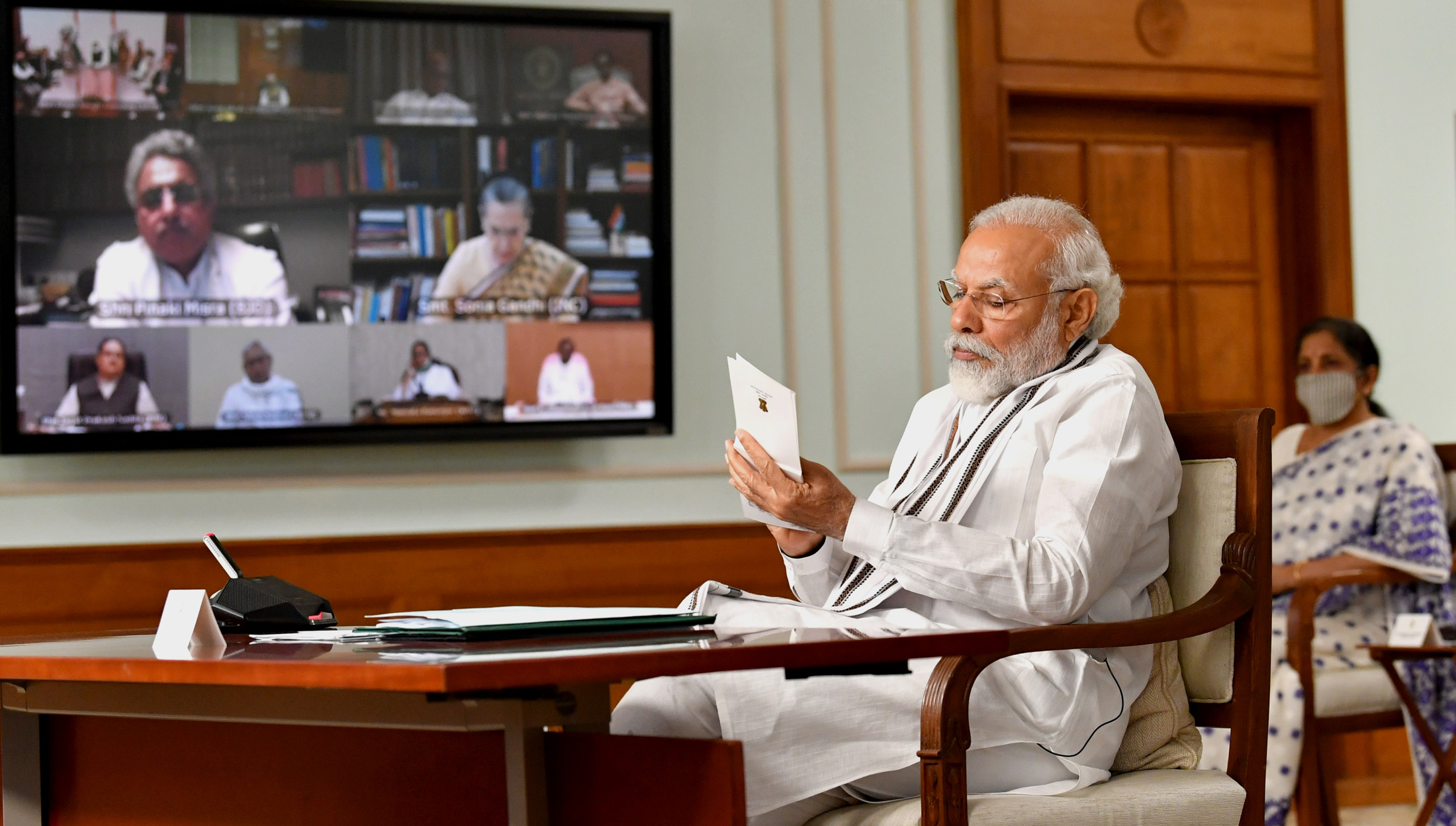
India's prime minister Narendra Modi holding a meeting with political parties via video conferencing to discuss the situation in Sino-Indian border areas on 19 June.

After the first melee took place, on 5–6 May 2020 at Pangong Tso, Foreign Secretary of India Harsh Vardhan Shringla called Sun Weidong, the Chinese ambassador to India. Then, Ajit Doval reportedly talked to a top Chinese diplomat Yang Jiechi. On 28 May, in a press conference, Indian spokesperson for the Ministry of External Affairs, Anurag Srivastava, maintained that there were enough bilateral mechanisms to solve border disputes diplomatically. (However, some critics say that these agreements are "deeply flawed".) The Border Personnel Meeting (BPM) points had rounds of military talks in May–June. First between colonels, then between brigadiers, and on 2 June, more than three rounds between major generals.

All these talks were unsuccessful. Some Indian military sources said that India was still unclear with China's demands. "When one wants to stall a process, one makes absurd demands ... they purposefully made some unreasonable demands", said the sources. On 6 June, commanders' talks took place at Chushul-Moldo BPM. The talks involved the Indian commander of Leh-headquartered XIV Corps, Lt Gen Harinder Singh, and the Chinese commander of the Tibet Military District (South Xinjiang Military Region) Maj Gen Liu Lin.

On 17 June 2020, Prime Minister Modi addressed the nation regarding the Galwan skirmish, giving a firm message directed at China over the deaths of Indian soldiers. The first communication since the start of the border dispute between the foreign ministers of China, Wang Yi and of India, S Jaishankar also happened after the Galwan skirmish. Jaishankar accused the Chinese actions in Galwan to be "pre-meditated and planned". On 20 June, Chinese social media platform WeChat removed the Indian Prime Minister's remarks on the Galwan skirmish, which was uploaded by the Indian Embassy in China. The official statements of the Ministry of External Affairs were also removed. WeChat said that it removed the speech and statements because they divulged in state secrets and endangered national security.

The MEA spokesperson's statement on the incident was also removed from Weibo. Upon seeing that the page said that the content had been deleted by the author, the Indian embassy in China issued a clarification that the post wasn't removed by them, and re-published a screenshot of the statement in Chinese. On 1 July, Prime Minister Modi quit the Chinese social media platform Weibo. On 3 July, during a surprise visit to military posts in Ladakh, Prime Minister Modi, said in a speech that the "age of expansionism" is over and history has revealed that "expansionist forces have either lost or were forced to turn back"; the media noted that this was in reference to Beijing.

Corps Commanders level talks Timeline
Year	Date	No.	BPM	Hrs	Summary
2020	6 June	1	M	—	Following India's request, de-escalation talks begin at BPM point, Moldo
2020	15–16 June	Galwan skirmish			
2020	22 June	2	M	11	Disengagement outline worked upon. Limited localised disengagement follows.
2020	30 June	3	C	12	No official comments. Limited localised disengagement continues.
2020	14 July	4	C	12	Disengagement reviewed, further disengagement discussed.
2020	2 August	5	M	10	Disengagement talks for Pangong Tso continue, India insists on a return to status quo.
2020	29/30 August	India takes control of multiple locations on Kailash Range			
2020	21 September	6	M	14	MoE representative, ITBP chief present. Post talk joint statement released.
2020	13 October	7	C	12	Post talk joint statement mentions "positive" and "constructive" talks.
2020	6 November	8	C	10	Chinese side put forward a proposal for de-escalation, disengagement and de-induction.
2021	24 January	9	M	11	Post talk joint statement mentions "positive, practical and constructive" talks.
2021	21/22 February	10	M	16	Pangong Tso frontline disengagement acknowledged. Disengagement process taken forward.
2021	9 April	11	C	11	Talks continue.
2021	31 July	12	M	9	Talks continue.
2021	10 October	13		9	Friction during talks. Independent statements.
2022	12 January	14	M	13	Joint statement issued. Agree on another talk.
2022	26 January	India China celebrate India's Republic Day at Chushul-Moldo and DBO-TWD.			
2022	11 March	15			
2022	17 July	16			
2022	Nov / Dec	17			(planned)
As of 4 February 2022. C = Chushul (Indian side); M = Moldo (Chinese side).

The second round of commanders' meeting was on 22 June. In an 11-hour meeting, the commanders worked out a disengagement outline. On 24 June, this disengagement was then diplomatically acknowledged by both sides during the virtual meeting of the WMCC. Chinese spokesperson, Zhao Lijian said that India "agreed to and withdrew its cross-border personnel in the Galwan Valley and dismantled the crossing facilities in accordance with China's request".

The third round of commanders' talks were held on 30 June; India reiterated its demand for the pullback of the Chinese troops from all key areas including Pangong Tso, Galwan Valley and the Depsang plains and the restoration of status quo ante in April whereas China emphasised that the military buildup in the region should be reduced. Following the talks, it was reported that Chinese vehicles were seen withdrawing from the Galwan clash point, as well as from Hot Springs and Gogra.

=== Disengagement and de-escalation efforts ===
After earlier unsuccessful attempts at complete disengagement, a discussion scheduled for 5 July, was held between special representatives National Security Advisor of India, Ajit Doval and Foreign Minister of China, Wang Yi, where it was decided that both Indian and Chinese troops would move back 1.8 km from the patrolling point PP 14, the 15 June clash site in the Galwan valley. It was reported that both the troops moved back around 1.5 to 2 km from the PP 14 to create a buffer zone, which would be off-limits for foot patrolling by them for the next 30 days. Chinese troop fully moved out of the clash site, along with thinning down of troops at Hot Springs and Gogra. The Chinese troops did not withdraw from the Pangong Tso, where they entered 8 km inside Indian patrolling territory.

On 25 July, Indian media reported a completion of disengagement at Galwan, Hot Springs and Gogra. On 30 July, shortly after the Chinese Defence Ministry claimed that gradual disengagement and de-escalation was taking place; India told China that the disengagement process is not as yet complete, with Indian Army sources saying that "there has been no positive movement on the ground for more than two weeks now" and that disengagement at Gogra and Pangong Tso was remaining.

On 30 July, the Chinese ambassador Sun Weidong claimed the process of clarifying the LAC could not continue because unilateral delimitations of the LAC cause more disputes. The fourth round of corps-commander talks took place on 14 July, while the fifth round of talks were on 2 August. On 24 July diplomatic talks were held between the two countries with regard to disengagement. Following the fifth round of talks, the China Study Group convened and found China's "mutual and equal" disengagement proposal at Pangong Tso unacceptable.

On day 100 of the border tensions The Week reported a statement from a defence official based in the Secretariat Building in New Delhi, "Indian military planners believe that things seem to be out of their control. Now, only a political intervention can resolve the issue. Military side has done enough with repeated marathon discussions." On 27 August, former Foreign Secretary of India, Shyam Saran said "India needs to be patient ... citing the example of Somdorong Chu in 1987 which took seven years to resolve".

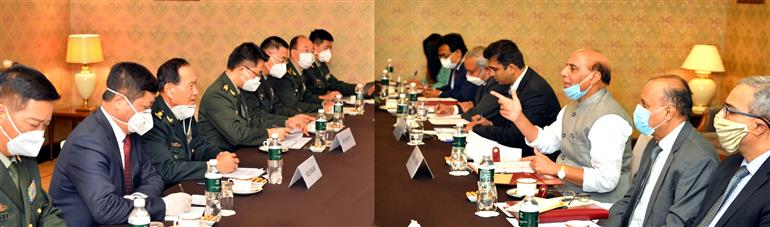
China and India hold talks on 4 September 2020. Visible are the Defence Ministers from both countries, Rajnath Singh and General Wei Fenghe.

Chinese General Wei Fenghe and his Indian counterpart Rajnath Singh held a talk, on 4 September in Moscow, on the sidelines of a Shanghai Cooperation Organisation (SCO) meeting. On 10 September, the foreign affairs ministers of China and India met in Moscow. Five points were agreed upon in a joint statement, including new CBMs between the two countries.

On 21 September, the sixth commander-level meeting took place at Chushul-Moldo BPM. The Indian delegation consisted of Lt Gen Harinder Singh, Lt Gen P G K Menon, two major generals, four brigadiers and other officers, the chief of the Indo-Tibetan Border Police and for the first time, a Ministry of External Affairs representative. Following the 14-hour talks, a joint statement was released, which included both sides having agreed to "stop sending more troops to the frontline". On 30 September, the fifth round of diplomatic talks took place; this was the 19th meeting of the WMCC.

On 13 October, the seventh round of military commanders talks in Chushul took place; while the talks were called positive, on ground issues and tensions remain. On 15 October, Jaishankar said that the talks between India and China to resolve the standoff are "confidential" and shouldn't be "prejudged". During the eighth round of corps-commander-level talks on 6 November the Chinese side put forward a proposal for de-escalation, disengagement and de-induction. The ninth round of talks were in January 2021, the tenth in February 2021, and the eleventh in April 2021. In February 2021, disengagement from Pangong Tso was reported. On 1 August 2021 a new military hotline was set up.

=== Linkage of border tension and bilateral relations ===
In an interview on 2 August 2020, the Indian External Affairs Minister said to the Times of India, "the state of the border and the future of our ties cannot be separated". On 4 August, the Chinese foreign ministry spokesperson said that the two countries should "make sure differences do not escalate into disputes" and that China hopes India will work with them in maintaining the "overall interests of bilateral relations." On 26 August, Chinese Ambassador Weidong said that China hoped India would not mix the functioning of Confucius Institutes with the border tensions—but a "brief moment" in history. However India maintained that the border tensions and normal relations between the two countries are linked. European Foundation for South Asian Studies (EFSAS) states that while China has tried to delink the border issue and other bilateral relations, "India has now been bitten enough times to realize the futility, even counter-productivity, of dealing with the border issue in isolation."

=== India's statements about transgressions, incursions, intrusions and infiltration ===
On 19 June 2020, during the all-party meet, Prime Minister Narendra Modi was translated as saying, "No one has entered Indian territory or captured any military post". In the Upper House of the Indian Parliament, on 16 September 2020, the Minister of State for Home Affairs, in response to a question from a BJP MP about infiltrations, said in a written reply that "since February there had been 47 cases of attempted infiltration along the India–Pakistan border" and "no infiltration has been reported along India–China border during the last six months." On 15 September 2020, in the Parliament of India, Defence Minister Rajnath Singh said "China made transgression attempts on Line of Actual Control (LAC) in the western sector. This includes the Kongka Pass, Gogra, and the north bank of Pangong Lake."

=== Official statements on territorial sovereignty ===
On 29 September 2020, a Chinese Foreign Ministry spokesperson said that China does not recognize the "illegal" Union Territory of Ladakh. In other diplomatic statements, on 8 September and then again on 13 October, China repeated that they have never recognized the Indian state of Arunachal Pradesh. China has routinely objected to Indian leaders visiting Arunachal Pradesh over the years. Before the national day of Taiwan on 10 October 2020, Chinese embassy in New Delhi issued guidelines for the Indian media over coverage of the national day.

On 15 October India told China not to comment on India's internal matters, referring to China's repeated insistence on commenting upon its infrastructure as being the cause for border tensions. At a political as well as an individual level, statements and actions related to the territorial sovereignty of Tibet, Gilgit, Baltistan, Aksai Chin and Shaksgam Valley have also been made. With regard to a new Chinese village near Longju in disputed territory Chinese foreign ministry spokesperson stated in January 2021 "... China's normal construction on its own territory is entirely a matter of sovereignty".

== Status of standoff and skirmishes ==
Status along the LAC in Western Ladakh
Location	De-escalation ladder			Delienation & Demarcation
Location	Disengagement	De-escalation	De-induction De-militarisation	Delienation & Demarcation
Ladakh	Underway	-	-	-
Pangong Tso	Frontline troops disengagement complete on 21 February 2021; Complete disengagement in March 2021	-	-	NA
Galwan	Limited localised disengagement in June–July 2020	-	-	NA
Hot Springs	Limited disengagement complete at some locations starting June–July 2020	-	-	NA
Gogra	Disengagement extends into August 2021	-	-	NA

=== Pangong Tso ===
Complete disengagement from Pangong Lake north and south bank took place in February 2021. Part of the disengagement deal at Pangong Lake was the withdrawal of Indian troops from positions they had taken control of 29 and 30 August in the Chushul sector and Kailash Range overlooking Chinese fixtures at Spanggur Gap and Spanggur Tso.

=== Gogra-Hot Springs ===
India reported a change in status quo in early May 2020. From May into early June, disengagement efforts at areas including Gogra and Hot Springs was underway. On 9 June 2020, PLA moved back 2 km at Hot Springs. However further de-escalation did not continue following skirmishes in other areas, including the 15/16 June skirmish which caused tensions. On 24 June 2020, disengagement in general was again agreed upon. Through early July 2020, disengagement was underway, and on 25 July 2020, India Today and ANI wrote of the completion of disengagement at locations in Hot Springs and Gogra. In February 2021, India Today, as per sources and officials, disengagement at other locations of Hot Springs and Gogra was yet to be discussed.

Following the twelfth military commanders talks, disengagement at Gogra post (PP 17A) took place on 4 and 5 August 2021. Indian analysts have postulated that the buffer zone created at PP 17A has resulted in the LAC shifting westwards. While the joint statement stated that "All temporary structures and other allied infrastructure created in the area by both sides have been dismantled and mutually verified", analysts pointed out that Chinese structures are still visible through satellite imagery.

== India's territorial loss ==
After the partial disengagement by both sides following the ministry-level discussion in July 2020, several Indian defence analysts pointed out the agreement is a failure of status quo ante bellum that existed until April 2020 and that return to status quo was unlikely. Furthermore, Indian sources have pointed out that the Chinese reluctance of disengagement from the bottleneck 'Y' junction in Depsang plains and finger 4 of Pangong Tso where Chinese forces further advanced inside of Indian claimed territory and constructed military establishments is an impediment to returning to the status quo ante.

As part of the disengagement process, buffer zones have largely been established inside Indian areas. In the buffer zone on the north bank of Pangong Tso, for instance, Indian troops can no longer patrol an around 10-km stretch from 'Finger-2' to 'Finger-8' now, though Indian maps show the Line of Actual Control at 'Finger-8'. A councilor of the LAHDC in Ladakh said that Indian territory has been turned into a "buffer zone" after Indian and Chinese troops completed disengagement from Gogra-Hot Springs in eastern Ladakh. He said "Our troops have gone back from not only PP-15 but also PP-16, which we had for the last 50 years or so. (...) Our grazing grounds have now become a buffer zone". He said that India's Kugrang Valley could become a disputed area. Former Rajya Sabha MP from the BJP, Subramaniam Swamy said in a tweet that India had withdrawn from its own territory. Indian military veterans said that the buffer zones represent a “new status quo” and that the creation of these zones amounted to “ceding further Indian territory” to the Chinese. Colonel Ajai Shukla said that in all the disengagements since April 2020 the buffer zones that have come into existence are entirely on territory both claimed and previously patrolled by India but now, as a result, India is denied the right to patrol up to where it previously could. On the other hand, China's buffer zones are not on territory claimed and previously patrolled by China and, therefore, China can continue to patrol up to the point where it previously did. He gave the example of Gogra, where the Chinese intruded 4 km into Indian territory and pulled back 2 km while the other 2 km have become a buffer zone. Therefore, this buffer zone is entirely on Indian claimed territory. Col. Shukla and other Indian veterans strongly criticised the Indian Prime Minister's statement of June 2020 when Narendra Modi said that there are no Chinese on Indian territory and never have been. This was an endorsement of the position of the Chinese government, and allowed Beijing to dismiss the allegations of border transgressions and claim ownership of all the positions it held. In 2020, India had rejected the proposal of equidistant disengagement as it would mean "loss of territory for its own side", but ended up agreeing to the same proposal in 2022. Experts had warned in advance that a 'mutual pullback agreement' would result in further loss of territory for India, a buffer zone entirely in Indian territory.

In 2022, Manoj Joshi estimated that about 2,000 sq km of land has been lost to India. This includes 900 sq km in the Depsang Bulge, a total of 100 sq km in Galwan Valley, the Hot Springs area, the north bank of Pangong Tso and the south bank near Chushul. Another 1,000 sq km were estimated to be lost in "the entire Kugrang Valley" and the Charding Nala area (near Demchok). Modi has been criticized for maintaining silence over the territorial loss. In January 2023, a paper presented to the Ministry of Home Affairs, with inputs from Ladakh Police, stated that India had lost access to 26 out of 65 Patrolling Points in eastern Ladakh since June 2020.

== Reactions ==
=== India ===
Following the Galwan clash, Chinese flags and effigies of paramount leader Xi Jinping were burned in various places across India and various groups registered their protests in different ways. On 3 October 2020, the Indian Army revealed a memorial to commemorate the Indian soldiers who died in Galwan on 15 June during Operation Snow Leopard. The inscription on the memorial reads:

On June 15, 2020 at Galwan Valley, Col B Santosh Babu Commanding Officer, 16 Bihar led the Quick Reaction Force of 16 Bihar and attached troops tasked to evict the PLA OP from Gen AY Nala and move further to Patrolling Point 14. The column successfully evicted the PLA OP from Y Nala and reached PP 14 where a fierce skirmish broke out between the IA and PLA troops. Col B Santosh Babu led from the front and his troops fought gallantly in hand-to-hand combat, causing heavy casualties to the PLA. In the ensuing fight twenty "Gallants of Galwan" achieved martyrdom.

The memorial has been built at KM-120 post on the Darbuk–Shyok–DBO Road. The names of those killed in the Galwan Valley clash have been inscribed on the National War Memorial in New Delhi. Special Frontier Force company leader Nyima Tenzin was given a public funeral with a 21-gun salute in Ladakh on 7 September 2020. Nyima Tenzin had died after stepping on a 1962 war mine. Tenzin's body was wrapped in both the Indian and Tibetan flags. In October 2021, 20 soldiers of the ITBP were awarded medals for gallantry along the LAC.

Amidst the standoff, during September and October, DRDO tested "10 missiles in 35 days", with Indian media reporting a total of at least 12 missiles or systems being fired. This included the Hypersonic Technology Demonstrator Vehicle and Rudram-1, an air-to-surface anti-radiation missile. The Indian media reported that the DRDO missile testing was considered significant by senior DRDO officials as it was undertaken against the backdrop of the standoff with China. However, it was also noted that COVID-19 had caused delays in previous tests, which were being conducted now. Amidst the standoff India decided to expand the scope for the teaching of Tibetology to its military officers.

==== Reactionary military procurement ====
The skirmishes and standoff has caused reactionary purchases by India. This includes the Indian Air Force starting the process for emergency procurement of 12 Sukhoi-30 MKI and 21 Mikoyan MiG-29 from Russia. In July, ThePrint reported that post Galwan, the Indian Armed Forces were working on over 100 emergency procurement contracts. In July it was reported that India was looking for lightweight tanks that could be used in Ladakh. While lightweights tanks for Ladakh has been noted since 2009, the 2020 China tensions created a sense of urgency. Despite Russia's offer for its Sprut light tank, India blacklisted the import of light tanks and started working on an indigenous tank (code name "Zorawar"), which is being designed in collaboration with DRDO and Larsen & Toubro. The tank is expected to be in production by 2023. On 28 September 2020, the Defence Acquisition Council, Ministry of Defence, under fast-tracked procurement, ordered an additional 72,400 SIG 716 for troops in Ladakh; the first batch of SIGs had been ordered in 2019 and have already been delivered to the army. Emergency purchases also included DRDO Smart Anti Airfield Weapons under the Indigenously Designed Developed and Manufactured (IDDM) category.

==== Economic sanctions ====
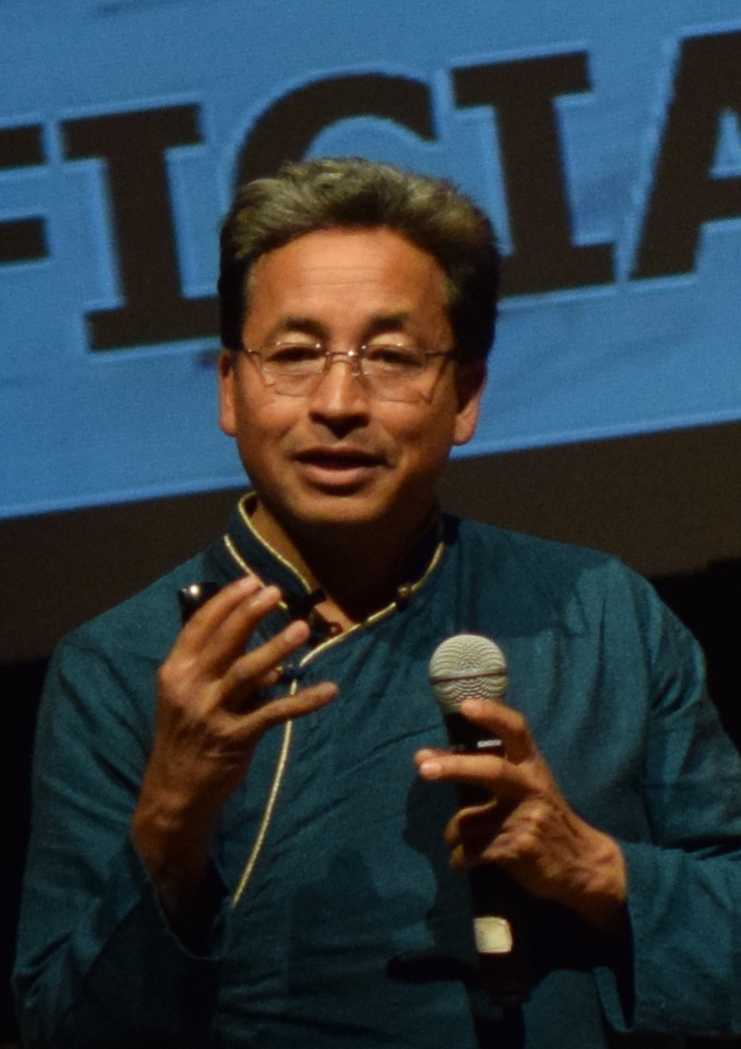
Sonam Wangchuk appealed to boycott Chinese products.

Initially, India's economic response to China was mainly restricted to patriotic programs on news channels and social media publicity appeals, with very little actual impact on businesses and sales. In May, in response to the border skirmishes, Sonam Wangchuk appealed to Indians to use "wallet power" and boycott Chinese products. This appeal was covered by major media houses and supported by various celebrities.

Following the Galwan Valley clash on 15 June 2020, there were calls across India to boycott Chinese goods. The Indian Railways cancelled a contract with a Chinese firm, while the Department of Telecommunication notified BSNL not to use any Chinese made product in upgradations. Mumbai cancelled a monorail contract where the only bidders were Chinese companies; and alternatively said it would focus on finding an Indian technological partner instead. Numerous Chinese contractors and firms were under enhanced scrutiny following the 2020 border friction. Chinese imports began undergoing thorough additional checks at Indian customs. In retaliation, customs in China and Hong Kong held up Indian exports. There were also calls for making sure Chinese companies do not have access to strategic markets in India. Swadeshi Jagaran Manch said that if the government was serious about making India self-reliant, Chinese companies should not be given projects such as the Delhi-Meerut RRTS. (However, in the first week of 2021, reports emerged that a Chinese firm had been awarded a contract for construction of 5.6 km of the Delhi-Meerut RRTS.) Days later, the Transport Minister Nitin Gadkari announced that Chinese firms would be banned from road projects in India. The Haryana government cancelled a tender related to a power project in which Chinese firms had put in bid. The Uttar Pradesh government Special Task Force personnel were given orders to delete 52 apps including TikTok and WeChat for security reasons while officials in Madhya Pradesh Police were given an advisory for the same.

Numerous Indian government officials said that border tensions would have no impact on trade between the two countries. Amid the increased visibility of calls for boycotting Chinese goods in the aftermath of the Galwan incidents, numerous industry analysts warned that a boycott would be counter-productive for India, would send out the wrong message to trade partners, and would have very limited impact on China, since both bilaterally as well as globally India is comparatively a much smaller trade power. Experts also stated that while the boycott campaign was a good initiative, replacement products should be available in the immediate future too. An example taken was the pharmaceutical industry in India which meets 70% of its active pharmaceutical ingredient requirements from China. Dumping in this sector is being scrutinized. By the end of June, some analysts agreed that the border tensions between India and China would give the Make in India campaign a boost and increase the pace of achieving self-reliance in some sectors.

The issue of Chinese materials in Indian Army bulletproof vests was again raised in June after the Galwan incidents. V. K. Saraswat, a NITI Aayog member and former DRDO chief, said that it was due to the quality and the pricing that Chinese material was being used instead of Indian products. Bullet-proof vests ordered by the government in 2019 had up to 40% Chinese material. On 20 June, it was reported that development of an Indian bulletproof vest, the "Sarvatra Kavach", that is 100% made in India, is near completion. The Maharashtra government put ₹5,000 crore (equivalent to ₹64 billion or US$690 million in 2026) worth of Chinese projects on hold. The Department for Promotion of Industry and Internal Trade brought out a list of over 1000 Made in China goods on which the Government of India has sought comments for imposing import restrictions. Previously, the Department had asked private companies to submit a list of Chinese imports. Incidents in Ladakh are also being taken as additional reasons to keep India away from the Regional Comprehensive Economic Partnership in which China has a big role.

Sales of Chinese smartphones in India were not affected in the immediate aftermath of the skirmishes, despite calls for a boycott. The latest model of Chinese smartphone company OnePlus sold out within minutes in India on 18 June, two days after the Galwan clash. Xiaomi India's managing director said that the social media backlash would not affect sales, adding that Xiaomi handsets are "more Indian than Indian handset companies" and that even many non-Chinese phones, people including American handsets, are made in and imported from China. Following this, the Confederation of All India Traders (CAIT), a Rashtriya Swayamsevak Sangh associated traders' organisation, made a statement claiming that Xiaomi's managing director was "trying to please his Chinese masters by downplaying the mood of the nation". TTK Prestige, India's largest kitchen appliances maker, said it would stop all imports from China from 30 September onwards. On 23 June, the government had ordered all e-commerce companies to show the 'country of origin' for products. In July, Hero Cycles cancelled ₹900 crore (equivalent to ₹12 billion or US$120 million in 2026) worth of projects with China as part of their "commitment to boycott Chinese products". Amidst the border situation in early August, the premier cricket league in India, Indian Premier League (IPL), decided to retain Chinese sponsors including the title sponsor VIVO. After facing a lot of criticism for this on various fronts, VIVO pulled out itself, supposedly also due to finance issues as well as the border tensions. The sponsorship deal was worth $293 million. By 15 October, the Indian government had put restrictions on more imports from China including television sets, tyres and air conditioners.

On 29 June, the Indian government banned 59 Chinese mobile applications including TikTok, WeChat, UC Browser, SHAREit and Baidu Maps. PRC responded with blocking Indian newspapers and websites in mainland China. Following the initial ban, in September, the Government of India further banned 118 more Chinese apps including popular gaming app, PUBG Mobile, citing the sovereignty and integrity of the country. In November, the fourth ban list was released, listing 43 more apps including Alibaba Group's AliExpress, Alipay Cashier and Alibaba Workbench. Following the fourth ban list, 200 plus Chinese apps had been banned by the Indian government, including apps owned by Alibaba, Tencent, Baidu, Sina and Bytedance. Various initiatives were taken across the country to stop the sale of Chinese goods during the festive season, and in turn replace it with Indian products.

===== Return of Chinese companies =====
By March 2021, Huawei was back into the Indian market with another deal worth ₹300 crore (equivalent to ₹385 crore or US$41 million in 2026) from Bharti Airtel. Supposedly Bharti Airtel decided to go ahead since Huawei was already looking after Airtel's long-distance networks. By August 2021, Chinese apps, including those from companies that had been banned, were back in the Indian cyberspace.

===== China India trade =====
India – China Trade at a Glance (USD billion)
India imports from China India exports to China
Sources:Trademap, ET

On 8 August, the Business Today reported that mainland China's exports to India since January 2020, amidst the boycott calls, had fallen 24.7 per cent year-on-year according to the Government of India's customs data. It was also reported that the share of Chinese smartphones companies in the Indian market fell to 72 per cent during the June quarter 2020 from 81 per cent in the March quarter 2020."

However, an article in The Hindu attributed the decline largely to the COVID-19 pandemic lockdown in India, with imports from China rising back to nearly pre-lockdown levels in July. On 9 September, the Financial Express reported that the "Border clash fails to dampen India-China trade" and that there was a "surge in exports" from India to China. Total trade between the countries in 2021 crossed US$125 billion.

In February 2022, India banned 54 more Chinese apps over the border clashes.

In 2022, India's imports from China reached record high, while trade deficit increased over $100 billion.

==== Kashmir, Ladakh and Arunachal Pradesh ====
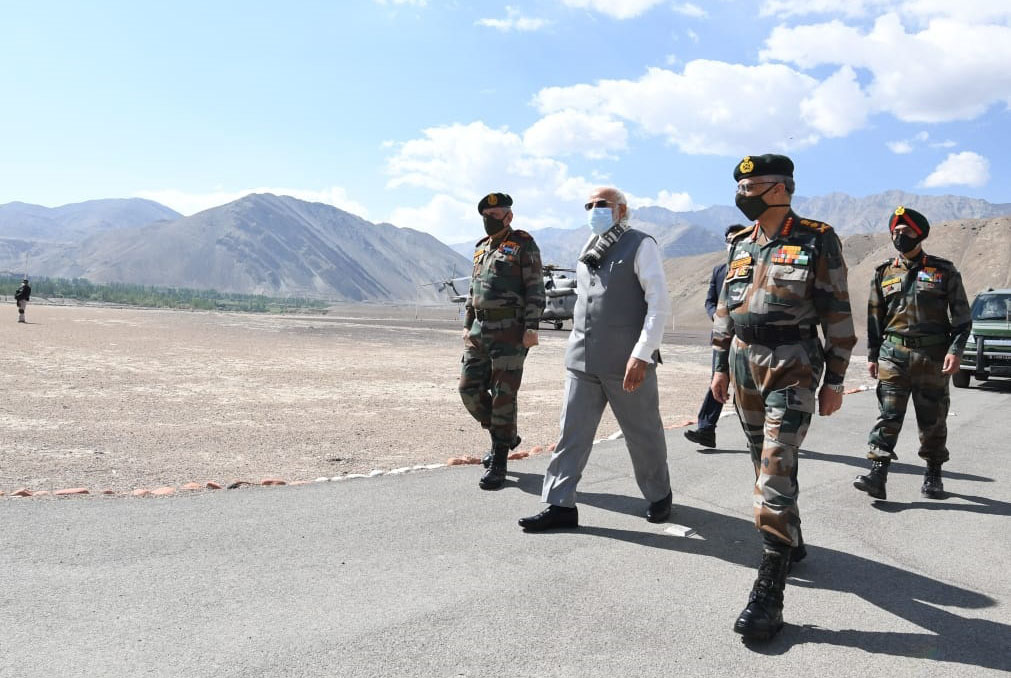
India's prime minister visits Ladakh on 3 July 2020 where he interacted with Indian military personnel deployed at forward positions.

On 6 September, the Hindustan Times reported that social media posts were being shared of how locals from Chushul and Merak villages are helping to supply water and other essential to the Indian Army, including front-line areas such as Black Top.

On 17 June, following the Galwan clash, former chief minister of Jammu and Kashmir, Omar Abdullah tweeted, "Those Kashmiris tempted to look towards China as some sort of saviour need only google the plight of Uighur Muslims. Be careful what you wish for ...". He deactivated his Twitter account following the tweet. Khalid Shah, an Associate fellow at ORF, writes that at large the Kashmiri population has "left no stone unturned to mock the government of Prime Minister Narendra Modi for the Chinese belligerence."

Stone pelters in Srinagar used slogans such as "cheen aya, cheen aya" (transl. China has arrived, China has arrived) to make fun of the Indian security forces while a joke going around is "cheen kot woat?" (transl. where has China reached?). Memes show Xi Jinping dressed in Kashmiri attire with others showing him cooking wazwan. Khalid writes that while China has become a part of many conversations, online and offline, India should be worried that "Chinese bullying is compared to the actions of the Government of India". Following the tensions with China, communication lines were cut in Ladakh in places along the border causing a communication blackout, resulting in local councillors requesting the government for the lines to be restored.

Following the Galwan clash former Arunachal Pradesh chief minister Nabam Tuki told The Economic Times that "After the ugly face-off in Ladakh on Monday night, it is only natural that the residents of the border villages of Arunachal Pradesh will have some worries". Prem Das Rai, a former member of Parliament, says that it is but natural that those along the borders will be concerned.

==== Wartime gallantry awards to members of Indian military ====
In January 2021, the Indian government decorated six Indian Army personnel for bravery during the Galwan clash ("Operation Snow Leopard"). One posthumous Maha Vir Chakra, the second-highest wartime gallantry decoration, and five Vir Chakras (four posthumous decorations) were awarded.

Key
†	Indicates posthumous honour

Award	Rank	Name	Unit	References
Maha Vir Chakra	Colonel	B. Santosh Babu^{†}	16 Bihar	
Vir Chakra	Naib Subedar	Nuduram Soren^{†}	16 Bihar	
Vir Chakra	Havildar	Kadukkaloor Palani^{†}	81 Field Regiment	
Vir Chakra	Havildar	Tejinder Singh	3 Medium Regiment	
Vir Chakra	Naik (Nursing Assistant)	Deepak Singh^{†}	Indian Army Medical Corps	
Vir Chakra	Sepoy	Gurtej Singh^{†}	3 Punjab	

==== Diplomatic boycott of the 2022 Beijing Winter Olympics ====
After it was revealed that People's Liberation Army regimental commander Qi Fabao was chosen as a torchbearer for the 2022 Winter Olympics, the Indian Ministry of External Affairs spokesperson Arindam Bagchi stated in a media briefing that "It is indeed regrettable that the Chinese side has chosen to politicise an event like the Olympics". Bagchi also stated that the chargé d'affaires of the Embassy of India in Beijing will not attend the opening or closing ceremony of the Winter Olympics, thus resulting in India effectively announcing a diplomatic boycott of the Olympics. The CEO of Prasar Bharati, India's public broadcaster, announced that they will not air the 2022 Winter Olympics opening and closing ceremony.

=== China ===
==== June 2020 to 2021 ====
Chinese Communist Party (CCP) general secretary Xi Jinping was reported to be under no public pressure to respond to the border tensions with India, even after the Galwan incident. Reuters reported that "Beijing's response also points to its interest in de-escalating a crisis over a stretch of border that is less politically important than other territorial priorities, such as claims to Taiwan and the South China Sea". Long Xingchun, a senior research fellow at the Beijing Foreign Studies University, wrote on 25 May that "unlike previous standoffs, the latest border friction was not caused by accident, but was a planned move of New Delhi. India has been clearly and definitely aware that the Galwan Valley region is Chinese territory."

On 26 May, Xi Jinping, during an annual meeting of PLA representatives urged the military "to prepare for the worst-case scenarios" and "to scale up battle preparedness." He had mentioned "battle preparedness" during his meeting with the PLA in 2019 as well. He said that the COVID-19 pandemic had brought a profound change on the global landscape about China's security and development.

Following the Galwan clash, on 20 June, the Chinese Embassy in New Delhi posted a written diplomatic protest "demanding India to carry out a thorough investigation into the incident ... [and] strictly discipline Indian front-line troops ..." On 25 June 2020, in an interview to the Press Trust of India, Ambassador Sun Weidong said that "the incident was completely instigated by the Indian side and the responsibility does not lie with the Chinese side." Concerning the number of Chinese casualties in the Galwan clash, Hu Xijin, the editor of the CCP-owned daily tabloid Global Times, tweeted "Based on what I know, Chinese side also suffered casualties in the Galwan Valley physical clash" but attached no numbers with it.

In August, China arrested a netizen for spreading "rumours" related to the Galwan clash and PLA deaths. He was arrested for writing that poor quality military vehicles manufactured by Dongfeng Off-road Company resulted in the deaths of the PLA soldiers. His arrest was noted in Chinamil.com, a Chinese Ministry of Defence website. A News18 report said that a number of voices, a growing "murmur", from the Chinese diaspora, showing dissent online has grown. The article mentions Deng Yuwen, Hu Ping and Wang Qianqian's comments about the border dispute, the strength of China's alliance with Russia, and infighting. In an interview to The Guardian, Cai Xia, expelled from the CCP on 17 August 2020, said that the recent India-China border clash and "provoking conflict" elsewhere was part of Xi's way to "divert the attention of the Chinese public" from "domestic economic and social tensions" as well as "to consolidate his own position and authority". On completion of 100 days of the tensions Ambassador Sun Weidong said that the "onus [is] 'not on China' to resolve [the] border standoff".

Liu Zongyi, the secretary-general of the Research Centre for China-South Asia Cooperation at Shanghai Institute of International Studies, in an interview on 21 September 2020, said that the Indian Army is nibbling away at Chinese land. He gave the example of Hot Springs near Dêmqog as being Chinese territory and said that it was under Indian control as China did not respond fast enough to "India's nibbling". (Note: Hot Springs is on the Indian side of the Charding Nullah, the Line of Actual Control between Ladakh and Tibet in this region.) Zongyi also accused India of having "secretly built roads during the night and at times [developing] roads at a speed of one to two kilometres per day." Zongyi called it an implementation of a "forward policy" or "offensive-defensive" policy. He linked the border tension to Hindu nationalism and added that India was becoming a "leading anti-China force", even more than the United States. Chinese foreign ministry spokesperson Wang Wenbin, on 29 September, once again said that China does not recognise India's union territory of Ladakh, objects to Indian infrastructure construction and that reports of new military bases being built by China were false and motivated.

Following the first ban on Chinese apps, Chinese Foreign Ministry spokesperson Zhao Lijian as well as the spokesperson of the Chinese Embassy in New Delhi, Ji Rong, made statements raising concern over the ban. Further, China warned India on 31 July 2020 that a "forced decoupling" of the economies of both countries will only result in both economies getting hurt, a lose—lose situation. Following the Indian governments fourth ban list in November, the Chinese Embassy in India stated, "... These moves in glaring violation of market principles and WTO rules severely harm the legitimate rights and interests of Chinese companies," while Zhao Lijian said that "the Indian government has the responsibility to ... protect the lawful rights and interests of international investors including Chinese companies."

On 19 February 2021 and onwards Chinese state media portrayed the deaths of four soldiers. On 31 May 2021, a Chinese blogger Qiu Ziming, was sentenced to eight months imprisonment for questioning PLA losses in Galwan. The portrayal of the four deaths as well as appearances on state-media by the regimental commander Qi Fabiao continued to the first anniversary of the event. On 3 August 2021, China released two short videos on the social media in relation to clashes in 2020.

In an end-year speech, Wang Yi, State Councilor and Minister of Foreign Affairs, took reference to India once, "China and India have maintained dialogue through diplomatic and military channels, and effectively managed and controlled frictions in certain border areas, under a shared commitment to improving and developing the bilateral relations".

==== Wartime gallantry awards to Chinese soldiers ====
On 19 February 2021, Chinese revealed that 4 PLA soldiers who had been killed in the Galwan clash as well as the regimental commander were honoured.

Awards/Citations/Titles conferred	Posthumous	Name	References
Guardian of the Frontier Hero, Order of July the First	Yes	Chen Hongjun	
Hero of Defending China's Border Forces, First-class merit citation	Yes	Chen Xiangrong	
Hero of Defending China's Border Forces, First-class merit citation	Yes	Xiao Siyuan	
Hero of Defending China's Border Forces, First-class merit citation	Yes	Wang Zhuoran	
Heroic Regimental Commander in Border Defense	No	Qi Fabao	

== International ==
=== Protests ===
Small-scale protests against China's actions along the Indo-China border were held in Canada, the United States and Japan. Tibetan-American, Taiwanese-American, and Indian-American held a rally at Times Square in New York raising placards with slogans such as 'Boycott China', 'Tibet stands with India' and 'Stop Chinese Aggression'. On 10 August 2020, a small scale protest against Chinese aggression was held by Indian-Americans at National Mall facing the United States Capitol in Washington. The protesters also praised India's move to ban Chinese apps and highlighted the plight of the Uyghurs.

==== Governments ====
- Australia: On 1 June, Australia's High Commissioner to India, Barry O'Farrell said that the border issue should be solved bilaterally. He also expressed concern about Chinese presence in the South China Sea.
- France: In the aftermath of the Galwan skirmish, the French ambassador tweeted condolences and concern for the Indian lives lost at Galwan valley. On 29 June, Defence Minister Florence Parly wrote to the Indian Defence Minister, extending condolences for the deaths of 20 soldiers, and also extended support over the LAC tensions, "I wish to express my steadfast and friendly support, along with that of the French Armed Forces". Parley also reiterated France's "deep unity" with India. With this France became the first country to extend the support of its military to India.
- Germany: Following the Galwan clash, the German ambassdor to India Walter J. Lindner tweeted, "Our heartfelt condolences to the families and loved ones of the soldiers who lost their lives in Galwan". Furthermore, foreign minister Heiko Maas urged China and India to de-escalate tensions to avoid a major conflict. On 4 September, Lindner said that the situation was "highly dangerous" for everyone and that both the "elephant" and "dragon" should ease tensions. He added that Germany was feeling the "repercussions" of the tensions in the indo-pacific region.
- Indonesia: The Ministry of Foreign Affairs called for India and China to both reduce tensions in the aftermath of Galwan.
- Italy: The Ambassador of Italy to India, Vincenzo de Luca expressed deepest sympathies following Galwan, adding "India and China are both very important partners not only for Italy, but also for the European Union as a whole." Both countries are crucial actors for regional and global stability".
- Japan: In response to the Galwan skirmish, Japanese envoy to India Satoshi Suzuki tweeted condolences for the Indian lives lost following Galwan. On 18 June the Ministry of Foreign Affairs called for a peaceful resolution to the situation. Suzuki, after a meeting with the Indian Foreign Secretary on 3 July, said that "Japan opposes any 'unilateral attempt to change status quo' on LAC."
- Maldives: In response to the Galwan clash, foreign minister Abdulla Shahid tweeted, "Maldives extends deepest condolences to the people of India for the lives lost in recent clashes on the border. Our thoughts and prayers are with the families, loved ones, and communities of the soldiers."
- Pakistan: Following the Galwan clash, foreign minister Shah Mahmood Qureshi said that Pakistan was closely watching the situation and "held India responsible for the conflict." Pakistan officially backed China's position in Ladakh. Amid the India-China standoff, in early July, Indian media reported that Pakistan had moved 20,000 troops to the LoC in Gilgit-Baltistan.
- Russia: Roman Babushkin, the Russian Deputy Chief of Mission in Delhi, stated on 1 June that Russia maintains that the issue should be solved bilaterally between India and China. On 2 June, the Foreign Secretary of India updated and discussed the situation with the Russian Ambassador, Nikolay R. Kudashev. Following Galwan, on 17 June, the Ambassador of India in Russia spoke to the Deputy Foreign Minister Igor Morgulov about the situation. Dmitry Peskov, Press Secretary for the Russian President, said that the situation was being closely watched.

Russia initiated virtual talks with India and China on 22 June. Russia had scheduled the RIC trilateral for March but delayed it due to the COVID-19 pandemic. About the border situation between India and China, Russian Foreign Minister Sergey Lavrov said that the topics for the meeting were already agreed upon and "the RIC agenda does not involve discussing issues that are related to bilateral relations of a country with another member." During the trilateral meeting India reminded Russia and China of India's selfless involvement in the Russian and Chinese interests during the World War II, where India helped both the countries by keeping supply lines opened in the Persian Corridor and over the Himalayan Hump.

Russia argued that a Sino-Indian confrontation would be a "bad idea" for both the countries, for the Eurasian region and the international system. Russia said such a confrontation will damage the Chinese legitimacy in the international system and will reduce the existing limited Chinese soft power. It had advised both the countries that it would be a winnable situation for both the countries with no confrontation while giving the example of zero confrontation of the Soviet Union and the US during the Cold War. Russia also proposed to hold the first meeting of the defence chiefs of the three countries which China and India also agreed during the meeting. However, Russia reiterated that China and India can sort out their differences through bilateral means without the involvement of a third party including Russia.

- United Kingdom: The British High Commissioner to India expressed concern over the Galwan skirmish and said India and China must resolve this through dialogue. Prime Minister Boris Johnson also expressed concerns and the UK was closely monitoring the situation in the valley.
- United States: President Donald Trump, on 27 May 2020, offered to mediate between China and India. This offer was rejected by both countries. Secretary of State Mike Pompeo also raised the issue in a podcast, and referring to China said that these were the kind of actions that authoritarian regimes took and that they can have a real impact. Eliot Engel, chief of the US House Foreign Affairs Committee, also expressed concern with the situation. He said that "China was demonstrating once again that it was willing to bully its neighbors". On 2 June, Prime Minister Narendra Modi and President Donald Trump discussed the Sino-Indian border situation. In the aftermath of Galwan, the US Secretary of State tweeted condolences to the people of India for the lives lost; while the US Department of State said that the situation was being closely watched. On 18 June Mitch McConnell stated that "for the sake of grabbing territory, the PLA appears to have instigated the most violent clash between China and India since those nations went to war in 1962".

On 20 June, Trump said that the US is in touch with both China and India to assist them in resolving the tensions. On 25 June, Mike Pompeo stated that American troops were being moved out of Germany and are being redeployed in India and other American allied South East Asian countries because of the recent actions by the Chinese Communist Party and to be appropriately positioned to act as a counter to the PLA.

On 1 July, following India's ban on 59 Chinese mobile apps, Mike Pompeo welcomed the decision and said that the move would boost India's 'sovereignty, integrity and national security'. On 24 September 2020, US President Donald Trump once again offered to mediate between China and India.

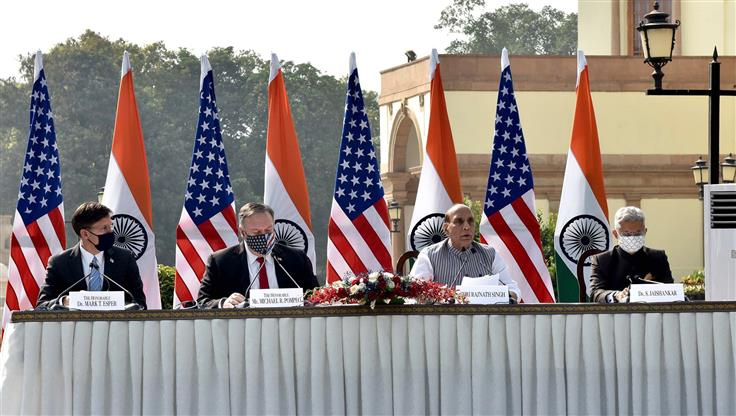
During the 2+2 Dialogue in late October both India and United States made references to the border tensions with China.

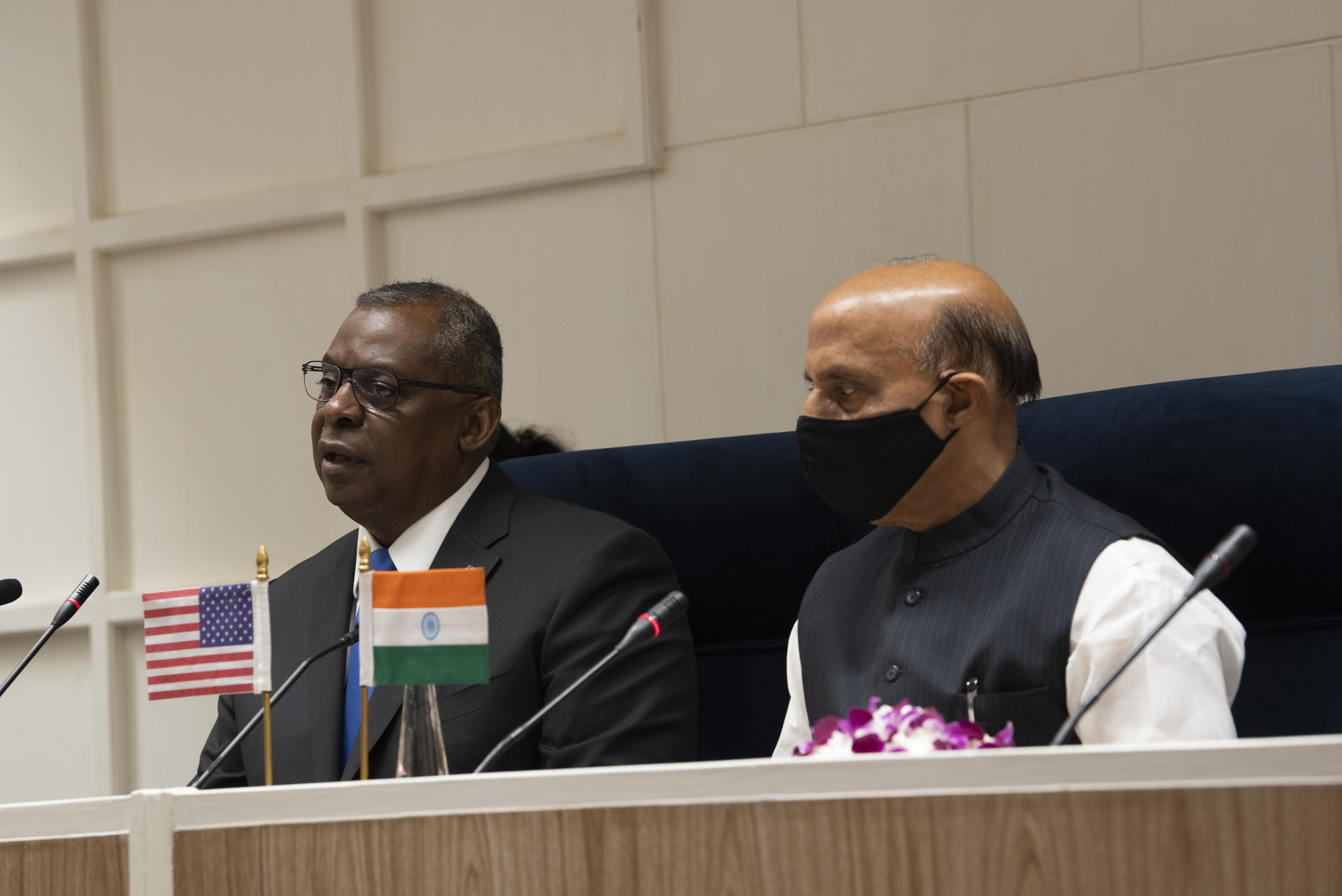
The US Secretary of Defense and Indian Minister of Defense in New Delhi, March 2021. US Secretary of Defense stated "... we had never considered that India and China were on the threshold of war ...".

In December, the annual report of the US-China Economic and Security Review Commission pointed to China having planned the Galwan incident, "Some evidence suggested the Chinese government had planned the incident, potentially including the possibility for fatalities." On 23 March 2021, Admiral John C. Aquilino told the Senate Armed Services Committee that India–China trust was at an all-time low.

Government-in-exile

- Tibet: President Lobsang Sangay made statements related to the border clashes, saying that "what happened to Tibet could happen to India" and that "the Indian government should make Tibet one of the key issues in its policies on China".

==== Organisations ====
- European Union: Following the Galwan skirmish on 15 June, the spokesperson for the European Union, Virginie Battu-Henriksson, called for de-escalation and a peaceful resolution.
- United Nations: Following the Galwan skirmish, the United Nations called for de-escalation and a peaceful resolution.

==== Commentary ====
An editorial was published in the Taipei Times titled, "Taiwan must stand with India" on 19 June 2020. The article analysed the India China border clashes; and ended by saying "Taiwan should deepen ties with India, in particular economic, military and intelligence ties, to contain Chinese expansionism and put Xi back into his box."

The European Foundation for South Asian Studies (EFSAS) wrote on 7 August 2020 that India's reaction to Chinese aggression has "surprised China". In a previous commentary in early July, EFSAS stated that China should realise that if it forces India into a corner, India will join "the ever-growing comity of nations that seek to compel China to adhere to the norms of the international order and abide by the rule of law", irrespective of India wanting or not wanting to walk down that path. In early September, EFSAS stated that India's tactical responses in Ladakh left "China stuck in quicksand of its own making."

On 19 September 2020, an article in the Nikkei Asian Review and the Hindustan Times noted that in 2020 while the world was busy watching the US and China conduct military exercises in the South China Sea from July through September, a distraction, "Beijing was engaged in a real-life standoff with India in the Himalayas".

A survey of over 1,000 Americans (reported on 1 September 2020) found that "over 63 per cent of Americans support neither China nor India if they were to engage in a military conflict. In the case of an economic conflict, 60.6 per cent of respondents supported no interference."

==== Quadrilateral Security Dialogue ====
On 9 September 2020, Japan and India signed the Acquisition and Cross-Servicing Agreement. Australia and India signed a similar Mutual Logistics Support Agreement (MLSA) on 4 June 2020. With this, India has military logistics sharing pacts with all partners of the Quadrilateral Security Dialogue (Quad).

== In media ==
=== Information war ===
In June, media reports started emerging of India losing the information and perception war to China. China's information warfare focused on trying to portray India as the aggressor and at the same time used the state media to repeatedly emphasize China's economic and military power. An article in the New Indian Express on 17 July 2020 stated that Indian soldiers felt that "India, with its muted approach, allowed China to dominate the narrative." Pakistan has helped China in the information war against India.

Tara Kartha, a former director in the National Security Council Secretariat of India, in August 2020, wrote on China's psy ops and propaganda during the skirmishes. She noted China's use of "strong media messaging" such as videos of "the swift mobilization of troops by air and train from Hubei province to the Indian borders". She points out that the troops were from the Wuhan area (a sub-provincial city of Hubei), the original epicentre of the coronavirus and that the "swift mobilization" would also mean the troops weren't acclimatized for the high altitude battleground of eastern Ladakh. Another video was of the deployment of Z-10 attack helicopters. Kartha notes that the original Z-10 has "underpowered engines (which make) it unsuitable for high altitudes" and that even Pakistan preferred American and Turkish aircraft rather than the Chinese variants.

Kartha mentions other attempts of propaganda by China, including reports of deploying karate fighters, capabilities of is naval prowess, 'power messaging' by Xi such as his directive to PLA to get ready for war, the usage of "wolf warriors" such as Hou Yanqi, the Chinese Ambassador to Nepal; while statements directed at keeping friendly relations, especially with the business community of the world are made by other senior officials such as China's Foreign Minister. The Hindustan Times noted that most of the psy ops tactics utilised by the PLA during the Doklam stand-off are being seen here again. India Today noted that the PLA have also conducted firing drills at locations from where the Indian troops can hear the sounds.

=== News media ===
Chinese state media have given little to no attention to the dispute and have downplayed the clashes. In the first month of the standoff, there was only a single editorial piece in the China Daily and the People's Daily. The People's Daily and the PLA Daily did not cover the Galwan clash while the CCP-owned tabloid Global Times (Chinese) carried it on page 16. The state broadcaster China Central Television (CCTV) carried the official military statement on social media with no further coverage. The Global Times ran a number of opinion pieces and one editorial which questioned why China did not disclose its death toll publicly.

China analyst Yun Sun explained that while there may be very little information in the English media of China about the border dispute, there is much more analysis in the Chinese language media. Chinese state media however welcomed Prime Minister Modi's 19 June statement. The Global Times quoted Lin Minwang, a professor at Fudan University's Center for South Asian Studies in Shanghai, as saying that "Modi's remarks will be very helpful to ease the tensions because as the Prime Minister of India, he has removed the moral basis for hardliners to further accuse China". In late June China blocked access to all Indian media and newspaper websites.

In India, before the 15 June clash, some Indian media persons and defence analysts downplayed the extent of the Chinese incursions. However following the 15 June clash at Galwan nearly all mainstream newspapers carried front-page stories as well as multi-page stories of the Galwan incident. Following the clash, Times Now published a list that it said contained the names of the Chinese soldiers who were killed in the clash but cautioned that the information "could be a fake forward"; multiple sources subsequently said that it was fake news. Another list reported by Indian media that was said to also show Chinese soldiers who were killed in action was described by Chinese spokesperson Zhao Lijian as fake news.

Ahead of the commanders' meeting on 6 June, disinformation campaigns were reportedly run by Chinese state-controlled media as well as corporations. The Chinese broadcasters showed military manoeuvres along the border, reportedly designed to frighten India. Following the Galwan clash, international coverage in The New York Times and The Guardian commented on the "nationalistic" character of the leaders of both countries and the "dangers posed by expansionist nationalism". BBC News described the situation in Galwan as "an extraordinary escalation with rocks and clubs".

=== Social media ===
There was a large extent of fake news in relation to border events from both Indian and Chinese handles. In the social media space, Chinese users used Pakistani memes against India. It was reported that Indian users had difficulty in understanding Chinese language memes meant to attack India. A Taiwanese image of Rama slaying a dragon was viral in the Indian social media sphere. TikTok was reported to have given "shadow bans" to videos related to the border tension. Statements from India were removed from Chinese social media companies such as Weibo and WeChat.

On 1 January 2022, the occasion of New Year, some Chinese media handles on Twitter and Weibo posted a video claiming that PRC's national flag was hoisted over the Galwan Valley. However, the satellite images and Indian army sources later confirmed that the flag hoisting happened in a demilitarized zone in a territory under Chinese control. Later, users pointed out that popular actors Wu Jung of The Battle of Lake Changjin fame and his wife Xie Nan were featured in the shoot. Some Weibo users also claimed that actors, directors, and junior PLA officers went to the location of shoot on 24 December 2021.

There were other instances of misinformation. In 2020, a Twitter account operated by a Fudan University alumna, had shared a video claiming that ten Indian soldiers were receiving hyperbaric oxygen treatment after the clashes and that the PLA had suffered no casualties. Subsequent fact-checks found that the footage was actually from a 2017 CGTN report showing an oxygen chamber used by the Tibetan Armed Police. An account falsely presented footage of US military Apache helicopters in Arizona as Chinese helicopters patrolling Pangong Tso and another account misleadingly claimed that China had "occupied" Pangong Tso by sharing satellite imagery of an Indo-Tibetan Border Police camp instead.

== See also ==
- 1962 Sino-Indian War
- 1967 Nathu La and Cho La clashes
- 1987 Sino-Indian skirmish
- 2017 China–India border standoff
- Chinese salami slicing strategy
- Doklam
- Timeline of 2020 China–India border standoff
