= 2020–2021 China–India skirmishes order of battle: India =

Indian order of battle during the 2020–2021 China–India skirmishes:

== Political leadership ==
Position	Name of officeholder
President of India (Commander-in-Chief)	Ram Nath Kovind
Prime Minister of India	Narendra Modi
Defence Minister	Rajnath Singh
Home Minister	Amit Shah

== Indian Armed Forces ==
Chief of Defence Staff (CDS):

=== Indian Army ===
Chief of the Army Staff (COAS): Gen. Manoj Mukund Naravane

Northern Command (Lt-Gen. Yogesh Kumar Joshi, GOC-in-C)

- XIV Corps (Fire and Fury Corps) (Lt-Gen. Harinder Singh to 13 October 2020; Lt-Gen. P.G.K. Menon from 13 October 2020, GOC)
  - 3rd Infantry (Trishul) Division (Maj-Gen. Abhijit Bapat, GOC)
    - 81 Infantry Brigade
      - 1 Bihar Regiment
      - 16 Bihar Regiment (Col. B. Santosh Babu)
    - 114 Infantry Brigade (Patrolling Point 15)
    - 70 Infantry Brigade (Eastern Ladakh)
- Elements of I Corps (Strike Corps) transferred from South-Western Command

Individual soldiers and larger elements of the following regiments under Northern Command stationed in Ladakh in 2020–2021 (mentioned for service during Operation Snow Leopard):

- 81 Field Artillery
- 16 Punjab Regiment
- 29 Punjab Regiment
- 14 Maratha Light Infantry
- 3 Grenadiers
- 6 Grenadiers
- 17 Kumaon Regiment
- 1/1 Gorkha Rifles (The Malaun Regiment)
- 3/1 Gorkha Rifles (The Malaun Regiment)
- 4 Gorkha Rifles
- 2 Dogra Regiment
- 16 Bihar Regiment
- 4 Mahar Regiment
- 13Mahar Regiment
- 4 Parachute Regiment
- 9 Parachute Regiment
- 2 Ladakh Scouts
- 4 Ladakh Scouts
- 18 Guards Regiment
- 11 Engineer Regiment
- 3 Infantry Division Signals Regiment

Western Command (Lt-Gen. Ravendra Pal Singh, GOC-in-C)

- 9 Corps (reserve brigades deployed) (Lt-Gen. Upendra Dwivedi to 26 March 2021; Lt-Gen. P.N. Ananthanarayanan from March 2021, GOC)

Eastern Command (Lt-Gen. Anil Chauhan to 31 May 2021; Lt-Gen. Manoj Pande from 1 June 2021)

- IV Corps (training brigades deployed) (Lt-Gen. Shantanu Dayal to 26 January 2021; Lt-Gen. Ravin Khosla from January 2021, GOC)
- XXXIII Corps (training brigades deployed) (Lt-Gen. Nav Kumar Khanduri to 13 September 2020; Lt-Gen. A.K. Singh from 14 September 2020, GOC)

=== Indian Navy ===
Chief of the Naval Staff (CNS): Adm. Karambir Singh

Western Naval Command (VAdm. Ajit Kumar P to 28 February 2021, FOC-in-C)

- Flag Officer Naval Aviation (FONA) & Flag Officer Goa Naval Area (FOGNA): RAdm. Philipose George Pynumootil

=== Indian Air Force ===
Chief of the Air Staff (CAS): ACM R. K. S. Bhadauria to 30 September 2021; ACM Vivek Ram Chaudhari from 30 September 2021

Western Air Command (AM Balakrishnan Suresh to 31 July 2020; AM Vivek Ram Chaudhari to 30 June 2021; AM Balabhadra Radha Krishna from 1 July 2021; AM Amit Dev from 1 October 2021

- AOC Jammu & Kashmir (AVM P. M. Sinha)
  - AOC Leh (ACmde Subroto Kundu)

== Indo-Tibetan Border Police ==
DG Surjeet Singh Deswal

North-West Frontier HQ (IG Deepam Seth)

- Leh Sector (DIG)
  - Leh (SSP Sargun Shukla)
