= Chen Hongjun =

Chinese battalion commander (1987–2020)

Major Chen Hongjun
- Native name: 陈红军
- Born: 20 March 1987; Longnan, Gansu, China
- Died: 16 June 2020 (aged 33) Line of Actual Control, Galwan River, Aksai Chin
- Buried: Lanzhou Martyrs Cemetery
- Allegiance: People's Republic of China
- Branch: People's Liberation Army Ground Force
- Service years: 2009–2020
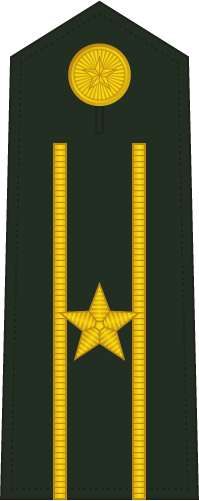
- Rank: Major
- Conflicts: 2020–2021 China–India skirmishes †
- Awards: July 1 Medal (posthumous) Medal of Devotion for National Defense

Major Chen Hongjun (Chinese: 陈红军; 20 March 1987 – 16 June 2020) was a battalion commander in the People's Liberation Army. He was killed during the 2020–2021 China–India skirmishes and was posthumously decorated with the July 1 Medal for his efforts during the skirmish.

== Life ==
Chen Hongjun was born into a farming family in Zhangjia Village, Liangdang County, Longnan. Along with his studies he helped his family, looking after the cattle and making bamboo baskets. He attended the local school in Liangdang County after which he was admitted to Northwest Normal University in 2005, and graduated in psychology in 2009. Although he had passed exams for the police, he decided to join the army.

== Aftermath ==
Chen died when he was 33, leaving behind his pregnant wife, Xiao Jianwen. The retired military affairs departments of Shaanxi and Gansu provinces provided medical support to Xiao. As she had a degree in music, she was given a teaching job in the Xi'an Conservatory of Music. Chen's son was born on 25 October 2020, and officials in China then worked on settling both mother and son in Xi'an.

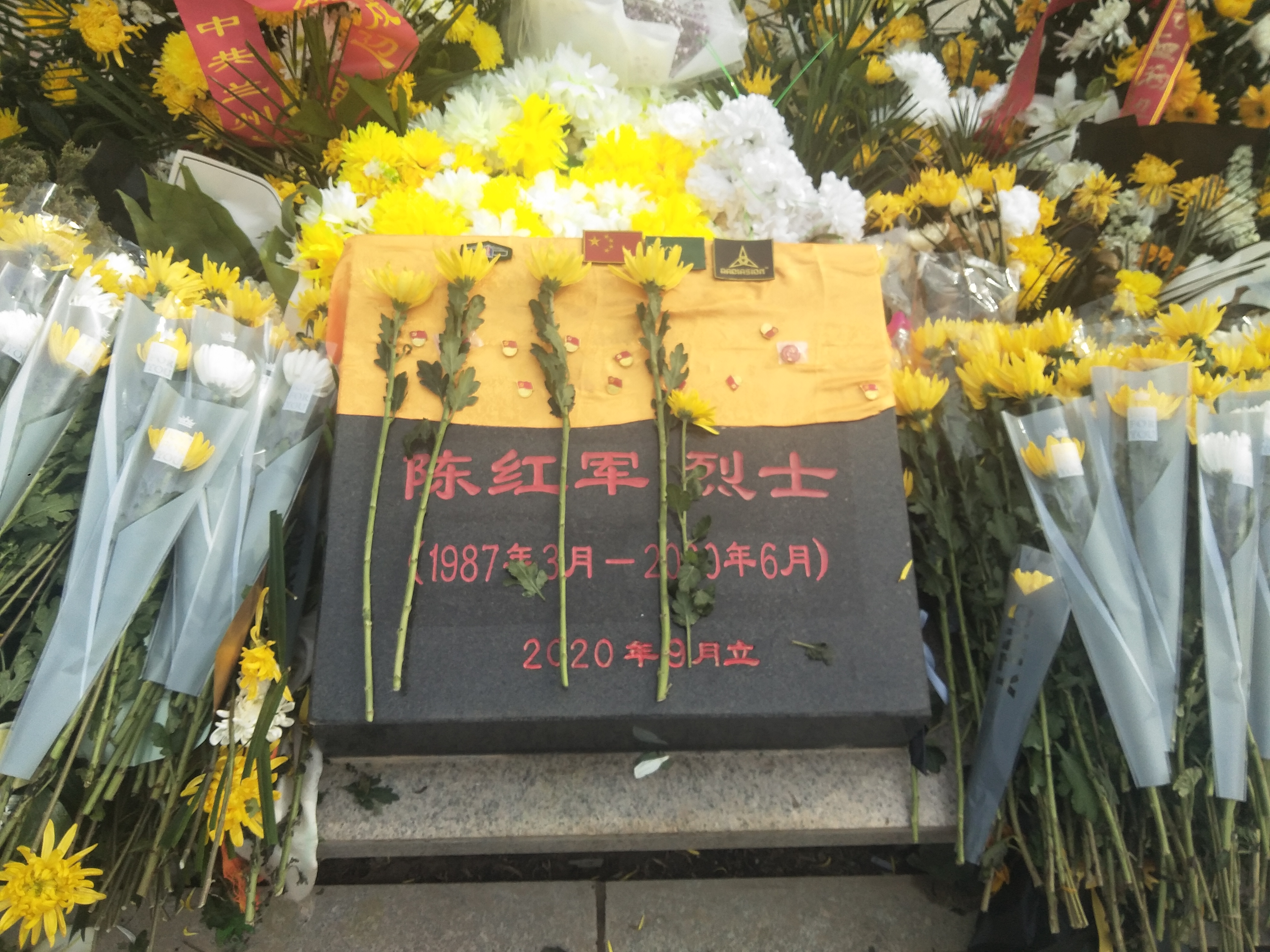
The tombstone of Chen Hongjun
