= Type 928 assault boat =

The Type 928 assault boat is a class of fast Chinese assault boats.

== History ==
In response to the Chinese deployment of the Type 0928D on Pangong Tso the Indian Navy upgraded the caliber of assault boat they were using on Pangong Tso.

== Variants ==
=== Type 928B ===
Basic model, deployed to Pangong Tso before C and D. It is ice resistant.

=== Type 928C ===
The Type 0928C is a patrol boat rather than an assault boat. It is built by Changzhou FRP Shipyard Co Ltd. in Changzhou, Jiangsu, China.

==== Specifications ====
- Length: 13.20m
- Beam: 3.24m
- Draft 1.30m
- Speed: 33.3kn
- PAX: 23
- Navigation area: Inland River Class A
- Propulsion: 2 x 440hp
- Armament: 1 x crew-served machine gun

=== Type 928 YC ===
Export model of the Type 928C, six delivered to Bolivia in 2019.

=== Type 928D ===
The Type 0928D is a modern assault boat generally modeled on the Swedish CB90-class fast assault craft. The Type 0928D is also built by Changzhou FRP Shipyard Co.

==== Specifications ====
- Length: 13.00m
- Beam: 3.8m
- Draft 1.80m
- Speed: 38.9kn
- PAX: 11
- Navigation area: Inland River Class A
- Propulsion: 3 x 295hp
- Armament: 1 x remote weapon station with 12.7mm machine gun and 2 x pedestals for crew-served machine guns

== Operators ==
- Bolivia - Six Type 0928YC in service
- China Type 098C is in service with PLAGF.

== See also ==
- Mark V Special Operations Craft
- Multipurpose Assault Craft
- Jehu-class landing craft
- Centaur-class fast assault craft
