= Cai Xia =

Chinese political scholar (born 1952)

- 蔡霞
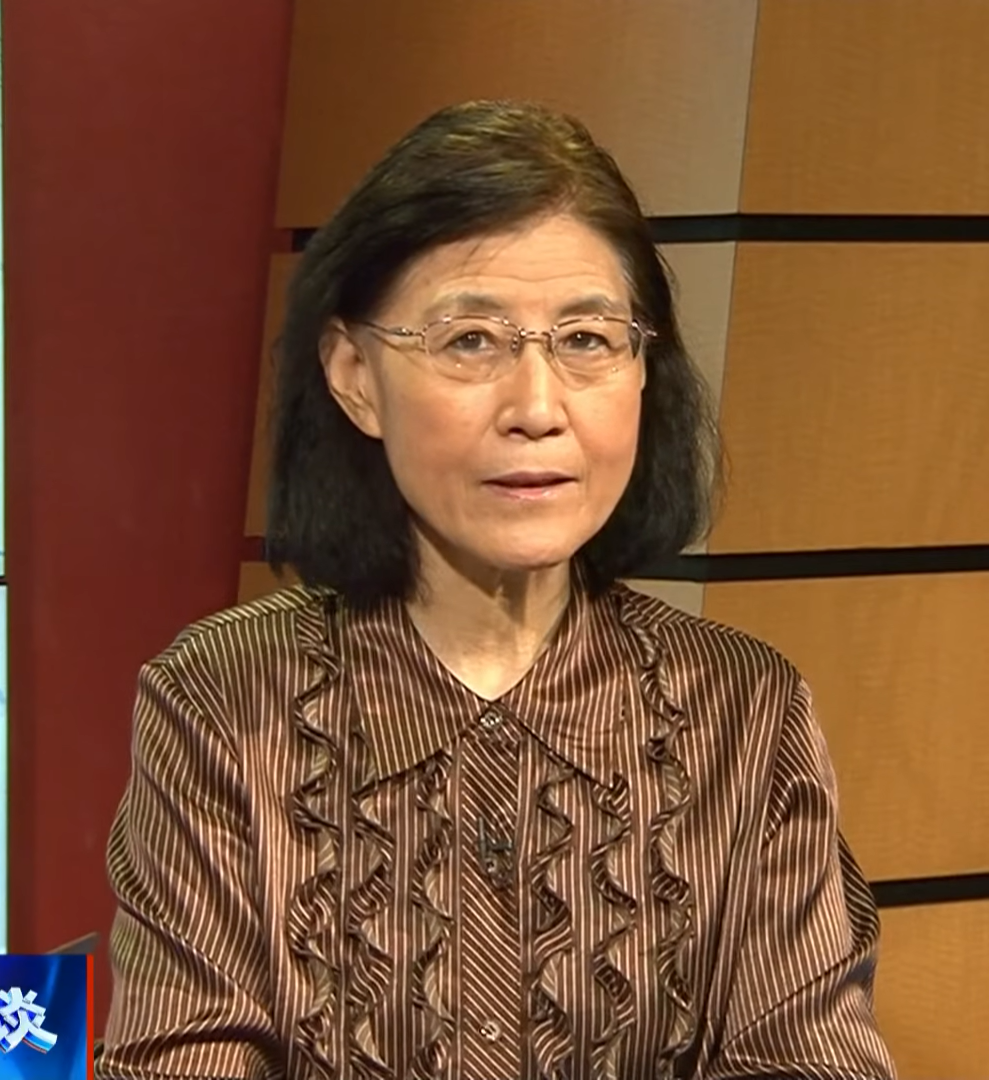
- Born: October 1952 (age 73); Changzhou, Jiangsu
- Education: Central Party School
- Occupations: Political Theorist, Academic
- Organization: Central Party School
- Known for: Criticism of General Secretary Xi Jinping, Political Activism, Dissent
- Political party: Chinese Communist Party (Expelled)

Cai Xia (Chinese: 蔡霞; pinyin: Cài Xiá, born October 1952) is a Chinese dissident and scholar of political theory. She has taught high-ranking members and officials of the Chinese Communist Party (CCP), including leading provincial and municipal administrators and cabinet-level ministers, and is a retired professor of the CCP Central Party School. She is an advocate for political liberalisation in China and has been critical of CCP General Secretary Xi Jinping. She was expelled from the CCP in August 2020 for criticising the CCP under Xi's rule. Since 2019, she has resided in the United States in exile.

== Career ==
Cai Xia was born in October 1952 in Changzhou, Jiangsu province and was raised in a family with close ties to the military, in which she served from 1969 to 1978 before joining the CCP in 1982. She was once a Red Guard during the Cultural Revolution. In 1980, Cai Xia became vice president of the factory's labor union and director of the family planning office. In 1984 she participated in a two-year program in Marxist theory and CCP history at the Suzhou Municipal Party School. Eventually she turned to work in academia, earning a LL.D. at the Central Party School in 1998. Specializing in the fields of party ideology and party building of the party state (with "party" referring to the CCP), she published over 60 scholarly papers between 1989 and 2020. As of 2012, she was a professor at the Party-Building Center of the Central Party School, retiring the same year after 15 years of service.

According to an August 2020 article in The Guardian, Cai began doubting the party orthodoxy in the early 2000s, when she assisted then-CCP general secretary Jiang Zemin with the drafting of his Three Represents theory. By that time she was frequently present in Chinese news media, advocating for liberal views including the opening of the CCP to more businesspeople and professionals. Her faith in the Communist Party was shaken considerably after a trip to Spain where she studied the Spanish transition to democracy and comparing it to China, noting that Mao and Franco had died at similar times yet Franco's successors had quickly and successfully transitioned to a stable democracy while Mao's successors had created a muddled hybrid economy and completely ignored political reform.

For some years she continued to believe in the ability of the CCP to solve its problems through reform, but her hopes gradually evaporated after Xi Jinping came to power in 2012 and implemented measures that Cai saw as going in the wrong direction. In 2013, she wrote an essay defending Charles Xue (Xue Manzi) after Xue was arrested on charges of soliciting a prostitute and forced to make televised confessions. In the piece, which widely circulated on the microblogging site Weibo, Cai opined that the offence was a private matter of no consequence to the public, and called for a discussion of the protection of individual rights. In 2016, she wrote an article in defence of Ren Zhiqiang, who was put on probation after the latter's heavy criticism of the statements by CCP leader Xi Jinping about the role of Chinese media. These and other essays were later removed by internet censors. In an August 2020 interview, after her move to the United States, Cai said that the incident that had erased all her remaining faith in the party was the Chinese authorities' handling of the death of environmentalist Lei Yang in police custody. In an essay dated 25 July 2020, published by Radio Free Asia, she denounced the treatment of Xu Zhangrun, who had been detained earlier that month, as "openly intimidating all in the Chinese scholarly community".

== Expulsion from the CCP ==
On 17 August 2020, Cai's membership in the CCP was rescinded and her retirement benefits were stripped. This was presumed to be in relation to a leaked audio recording in which she denounced CCP general secretary Xi Jinping as a "mafia boss" who ought to be replaced slamming the CCP as a "political zombie". Cai, who was residing in the United States at the time of the expulsion, told The New York Times that she had contemplated resigning from the CCP since much earlier, and welcomed no longer being a party member, saying that it had allowed her to regain freedom.

[T]he engagement policy that had been so painstakingly maintained for a long time was just wishful thinking of the two political parties and the government of the United States. The CCP has merely been using the engagement policy for its own needs. The CCP just used and took advantage of the goodwill and benign intentions of the Americans. The reason why the engagement policy ended sadly is due to the fundamental misjudgment by the United States about the nature of the Chinese Communist Party and regime, which in turn has made the US a victim of its own policy. The consequences of misjudging the nature of the CCP regime can be described in a Chinese idiom: “leaving a carbuncle unchecked will lead to endless troubles.” [养痈贻患]

— Cai Xia, 2021

== Views ==
On 23 August 2020, in an interview with CNN, Cai Xia expressed support for the U.S. government's ban on Huawei and proposed that the U.S. government impose sanctions on CCP officials, while also asking the international community to prevent the CCP from infiltrating international organizations.

Cai Xia has urged the U.S. to abandon its "naive" hopes of engagement with Beijing, while also warning that China's leadership is more fragile than it has appeared. In June 2021, the Hoover Institution published a long paper by Cai where she expounded on those views. Hoover senior fellow Larry Diamond commented that Cai's paper was "of great historical and policy significance", adding, "For the first time, we have an important figure from within the Chinese Communist Party system courageously confirming what many US scholars of China have recently been arguing: CCP leaders have never viewed cooperative engagement with the US as anything more than a temporary tactic to enable them to accumulate the strength to pursue regional and global dominance."

In December 2021, in an article published in The Economist, Cai said, "The one-party dictatorship is a major obstacle for China. It may even trigger unforeseen social or political disasters. Only by ending this totalitarian system of governance and moving towards a constitutional democracy will the country be on course for good and durable economic and social development."

In September 2022, in an article published in Foreign Affairs, Cai said, "Outsiders may find it helpful to think of the CCP as more of a mafia organization than a political party."

== See also ==
- Ren Zhiqiang
- Xu Zhangrun
