= B. Santosh Babu =

Indian Army officer (1983–2020)

Colonel B. Santosh Babu MVC
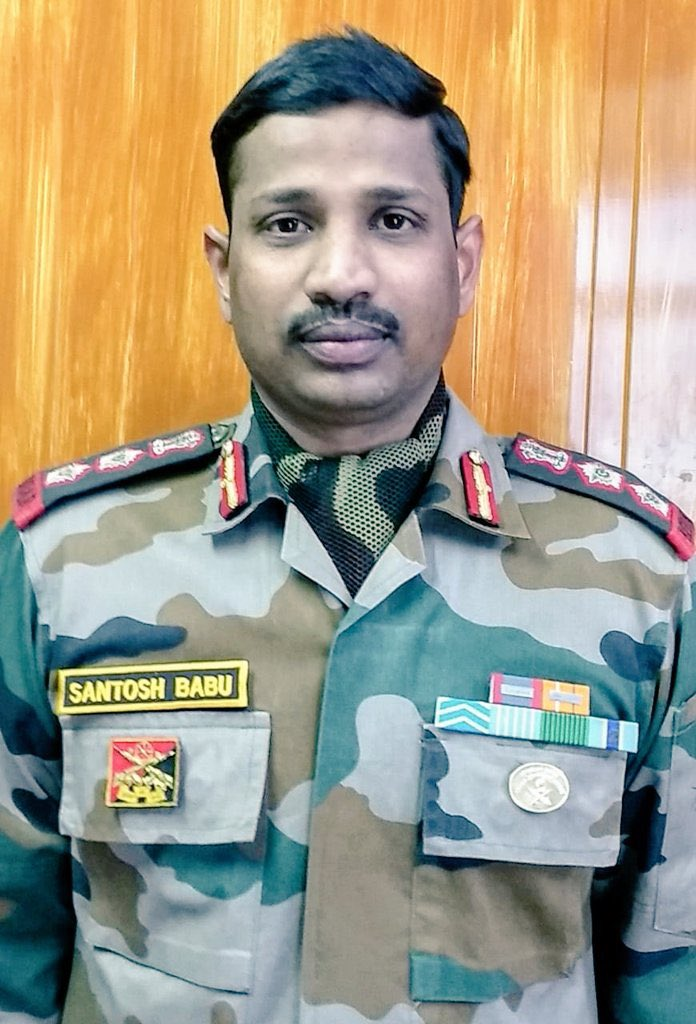
- Born: 13 February 1983; Suryapet, Andhra Pradesh (now in Telangana), India
- Died: 15 June 2020 (aged 37); Line of Actual Control, Galwan River, Aksai Chin
- Military career
- Allegiance: India
- Branch: Indian Army
- Service years: 2004-2020
- Rank: Colonel
- Service number: IC-64405M
- Unit: 16 Bihar Regiment
- Conflicts: Kivu conflict 2020 China–India skirmishes †
- Awards: Maha Vir Chakra (posthumous)

Colonel Bikkumalla Santosh Babu MVC (Telugu: బిక్కుమల్ల సంతోష్ బాబు; 13 February 1983 – 15 June 2020) was an Indian Army officer and the commanding officer of 16 Bihar Regiment. He was killed in action (KIA) during the 2020 China–India skirmishes, the first Indian Armed Forces commissioned officer since 1967 and among the first Indian soldiers to have been KIA against the Chinese People's Liberation Army (PLA) since 1975. (Note: Prior to Babu's death, the last time a commissioned officer of the Indian Armed Forces had been killed in action against the PLA had been during the 1967 Nathu La and Cho La clashes. In October 1975, a patrol of the Assam Rifles (a paramilitary force under the Home Ministry) comprising an NCO and four other soldiers was ambushed by Chinese troops, resulting in four deaths.) He was posthumously decorated with India's second-highest wartime gallantry award, the Maha Vir Chakra.

== Early and personal life ==
A native of Suryapet in Telangana in India, Babu was the only son of Bikkumalla Upender, a retired manager with the State Bank of India, and his wife Manjula. From 1988 to 1993, during his class I to class V years, he studied in Sri Saraswathi Shishumandir School at Luxettipet in Mancherial district. He was described by his schoolmates and teachers as a brilliant student. After primary school, Santosh was accepted to Sainik School in Korukonda, Vizianagaram district, where he completed his schooling.

In 2009, Babu married Santoshi. The couple had a daughter Abhigna (aged nine at her father's death) and a son Anirudh (aged four). His family resided in Delhi. Santoshi was appointed as a Deputy Collector in the revenue department of the Telangana government following her husband's death, following which she would undergo the required training.

== Army career ==
On 27 November 2000, Babu joined the 105 course of the National Defence Academy and subsequently went to the Indian Military Academy in 2004. During his time at the NDA, he belonged to the "November" squadron. He was commissioned as a lieutenant in 16 Bihar on 10 December 2004, one of 105 successful cadets. After passing out, he was posted to Jammu and Kashmir state.

Babu was promoted to captain on 10 December 2006, followed by promotion to major on 10 December 2010. He attended the Defence Services Staff College at Wellington. During his service, he was attached to the Rashtriya Rifles in Jammu and Kashmir, and also served with the UN peacekeeping force in the Democratic Republic of the Congo (DRC) during the ongoing Kivu conflict. Colleagues who served with him described him as "empathetic, yet bold." During a major joint operation conducted by DRC and South African forces against Nduma Defense of Congo (NDC) rebels, Babu and his unit were caught in cross-fire, yet his actions aided in preventing the rebels from inflicting casualties on the joint force. During his posting in the Congo, Babu was described as kind and generous towards local residents, assisting them with medical and other needs.

Babu was promoted lieutenant-colonel on 10 December 2017. After serving as a divisional officer and Instructor Class "B" at the NDA, he was appointed a GSO I at the HQ of 35 Infantry Brigade. He received another posting to Jammu and Kashmir in 2019, and assumed command of 16 Bihar on 2 December 2019. He was promoted full colonel in February 2020.

== Death ==
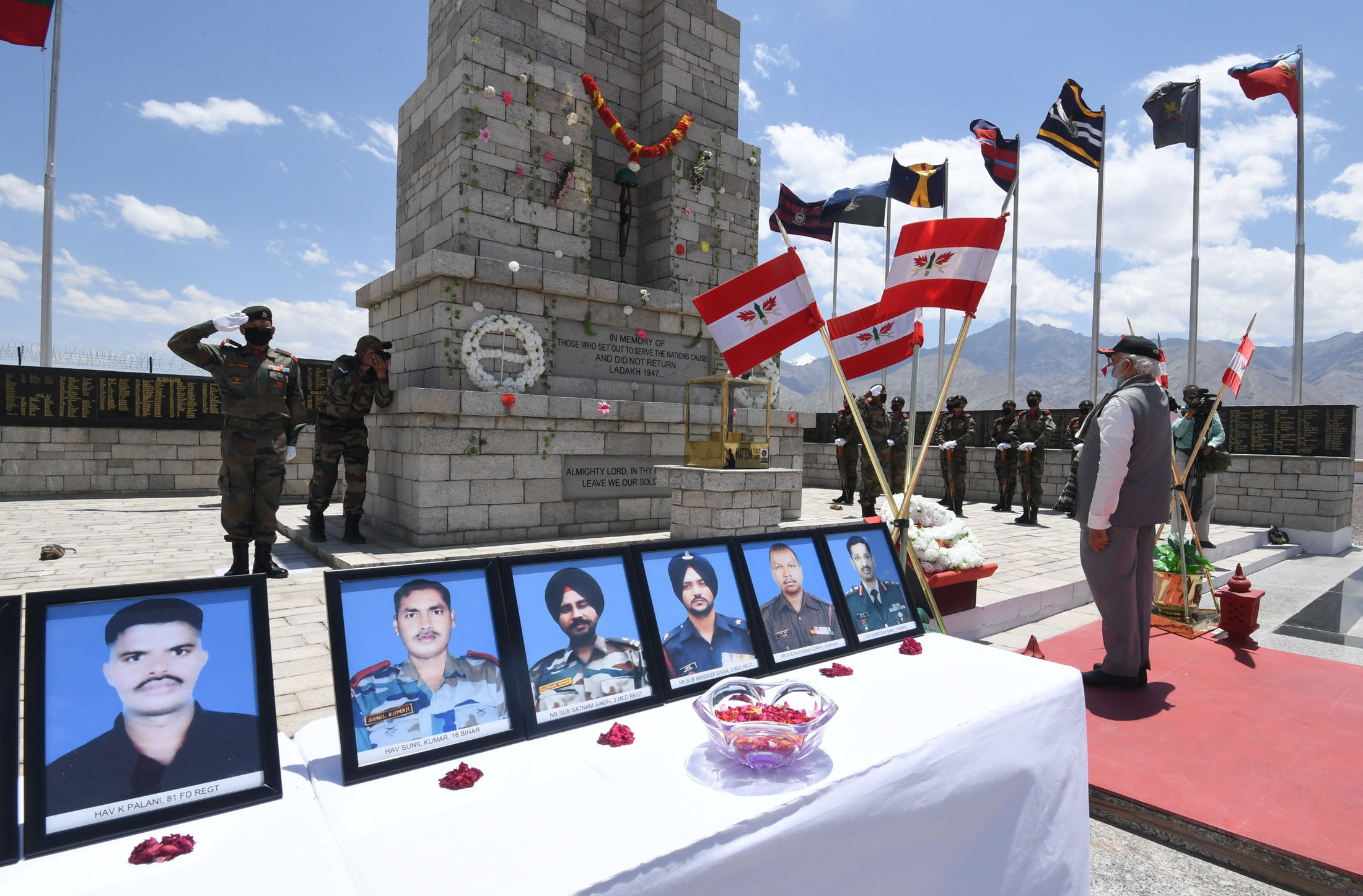
PM Modi paying tribute to fallen soldiers in Ladakh. B. Santosh Babu can be seen in the photograph closest to Prime Minister Narendra Modi

Following high-level talks during the 2020 skirmishes with the PLA in eastern Ladakh, 16 Bihar monitored the Chinese forces in the Galwan Valley to ensure their disengagement. According to Indian sources, on 14 June, a group of PLA troops erected tents and an observation post on the LAC in contravention of an agreement made on 6 June and India's perception of the Line of Actual control. Babu led a delegation and made an attempt to communicate, which soon resulted in a fistfight with both sides sustaining injuries. Reinforcements were sent for, more melee continued resulting in more injuries on both sides. The Indian military said that in response, the soldiers of 16 Bihar 'reportedly' killed 40 to 45 soldiers of PLA in hand-to-hand combat and inflicted heavy casualties upon them. The PLA admitted the death of at least four of its soldiers.

Babu's body was flown by military aircraft to the military airport at Hakimpet in Telangana on 17 June. From there, his remains were driven to his family's farm at Kesaram village in Suryapet. His body was cremated with full military honours on 18 June, with his father lighting the funeral pyre. Despite the ongoing COVID-19 epidemic, his funeral was attended by thousands of mourners from the area, with police on hand to ensure distancing and hygiene were maintained.

Following Babu's death, Telangana Chief Minister K. Chandrashekar Rao announced the state government would award his family an ex gratia payment of ₹5 crore (US$519,213), along with a residential plot and a Group-I government job for his wife Santoshi. The chief minister also announced the state would award ₹10 lakh (US$10,384) each to the families of the 19 other soldiers who had been killed. CM Chandrasekhar Rao visited Santosh Babu's home at Suryapet June 22 to give the strength and to assure the support of Telangana Government.

In the 2021 Republic Day honours list, Babu was posthumously decorated with the Maha Vir Chakra (MVC), the second-highest Indian wartime gallantry decoration. His widow and mother received the decoration on his behalf at an investiture ceremony on 23 November. Babu's full citation reads as follows:

IC-64405M COLONEL BIKKUMALLA SANTOSH BABU

16TH BATTALION THE BIHAR REGIMENT

(POSTHUMOUS)

Colonel Bikkumalla Santosh Babu, Commanding Officer 16 BIHAR deployed in Galwan Valley (Eastern Ladakh) during Operation SNOW LEOPARD, was tasked to establish an Observation Post in [the] face of the enemy. Organising and briefing his troops about the situation with a sound plan, he successfully executed the task. While holding the position, his column faced stiff resistance from the adversary who attacked using lethal and sharp weapons along with heavy stone pelting from adjoining heights. Undaunted by the violent and aggressive action by the overwhelming strength of [the] enemy soldiers, the officer in [the] true spirit of service before self continued to resist the enemy’s attempt to push back Indian troops.

Despite being grievously injured, Colonel Bikkumalla Santosh Babu led from the front with absolute command and control despite hostile conditions to deter the vicious enemy attack on his position. In the skirmish that broke out and ensuing hand-to-hand combat with [the] enemy soldiers, he valiantly resisted the enemy attack till his last breath, inspiring and motivating his troops to hold [their] ground. Colonel Bikkumalla Santosh Babu displayed exemplary leadership and astute professionalism. He showed conspicuous bravery in the face of [the] enemy and made [the] supreme sacrifice for the nation.

== Decorations ==

Maha Vir Chakra (posthumous)	Special Service Medal		Sainya Seva Medal (clasp for Jammu and Kashmir)
High Altitude Service Medal	Videsh Seva Medal	9 Years Long Service Medal	UN Mission in Congo Medal
