= Nie zhai =

Nie zhai may refer to:

- Educated Youth (novel), a 1991 Chinese novel by Ye Xin
- Sinful Debt, a 1995 Chinese TV series based on Ye's novel
  - Sinful Debt 2, a 2010 television sequel
