= Breaking with Old Ideas =

1975 film

- Traditional Chinese: 決裂
- Simplified Chinese: 决裂
- Hanyu Pinyin: Juéliè
- Directed by: Li Wenhua
- Written by: Chunchao; Zhou Jie
- Starring: Guo Zhenqing; Wang Suya
- Cinematography: Zheng Yuyuan; Luo De'an
- Music by: Lü Yuan; Tang He
- Production company: Beijing Film Studio
- Release date: January 1, 1976
- Running time: 127 minutes
- Country: China
- Language: Mandarin

Breaking with Old Ideas (also known as The Breakup) is a 1975 Chinese propaganda film directed by Li Wenhua. The film is one of the few that were produced during the Cultural Revolution. As a result of the political upheaval taking place, Breaking with Old Ideas's plot was heavily regulated under highly codified guidelines on story and characterization so that it would have a mass character, as opposed to an individual focused character, namely proletarian politics as opposed to bourgeois politics. The film draws inspiration from issues with schooling in China at the time, such as that there was too much study, and too little social practice.

Breaking with Old Ideas was one of the first films that was removed from public viewing after the Gang of Four was overthrown and the educational revolution campaign was ended.

== Plot ==
In 1958, the Chinese Communist Party sends Long Guozheng (Guo Zhenqing), a graduate of the Counter-Japanese Military and Political University, to head the newly established Jiangxi Communist Labour University (today's Jiangxi Agricultural University). The school's more capitalist elements, such as aiming for high bourgeois academic standards, and refusal to admit poorly-educated (according to bourgeois standards) peasants clash with Long's more communistic approach. He advocates only admitting students from the working class, and begins innovative changes—to the dismay of many other staff—such as putting more emphasis on hard labor than classroom learning, switching courses to accommodate experiential learning, removing impractical sections from the curriculum, holding lessons in the field, and excusing students who miss exams to work for the commune. Later, a student, Li Jinfeng (Wang Suya), whom Long considers an exemplary follower of the "educational revolution", faces expulsion and is put on trial. The masses come out in support of her and denounce those taking the capitalist line on education. Those in power taking the capitalist line decide to shut down the college as a result. In the end, the college is saved by the will of the peasants and a pronouncement from Mao Zedong himself.

== Cast ==
- Guo Zhenqing as Long Guozheng
- Wang Suya as Li Jinfeng
- Wen Xiying as Deputy Secretary Tang
- Xu Zhan as Xu Niuzai
- Zhang Zheng as Old Representative
- Li Shijiang as Jiang Danian
- Hou Guanqun as Yu Gang
- Xiang Hong as Cao Xiaomei
- Wu Jing as Xiao Ping

== Release ==
Breaking with Old Ideas was released on New Year's Day in 1976. Commentary articles at the time believed that the film joined the great debate on the educational revolution at the right time, "powerfully refuted the strange ideas in the education sector, fought back against the rightist trend of reversing the verdict of the proletarian Cultural Revolution, and played an inspiring and combative role." After the Smashing of the Gang of Four, Li Wenhua was censored and criticized mainly because he made another film, Counterattack, and Breaking with Old Ideas was not classified as a conspiracy film. In 1979, the People's Daily published an article criticizing the film, "What kind of film is The Breakup?"

=== Later evaluation ===
Li Wenhua, Guo Zhenqing, and Ge Cunzhuang later expressed limited affirmation of the film. Pan Tianqiang, a professor at the School of Literature of Renmin University of China, held a negative attitude towards the film, believing that it completely distorted the Communist Party's model of "adapting to local conditions and running schools at different levels."
