= Lesheng =

Lesheng may refer to the following:

- Lesheng Township (乐胜乡), a township in Da'an, Jilin, China
- Yu Lesheng, a character in the Chinese television series Sinful Debt
- Losheng Sanatorium, a sanatoriumfor lepers in Xinzhuang District, New Taipei, Taiwan
- Ding Mocun (1901 – 1947), also known as Ding Lesheng (丁勒生; pinyin: Dīng Lèshēng), a politician in the early Republic of China
- Huilong metro station, secondary station name Losheng, a station in the Taipei MRT
