= Li Dazhao =

Chinese intellectual and revolutionary (1889–1927)

- 李大釗
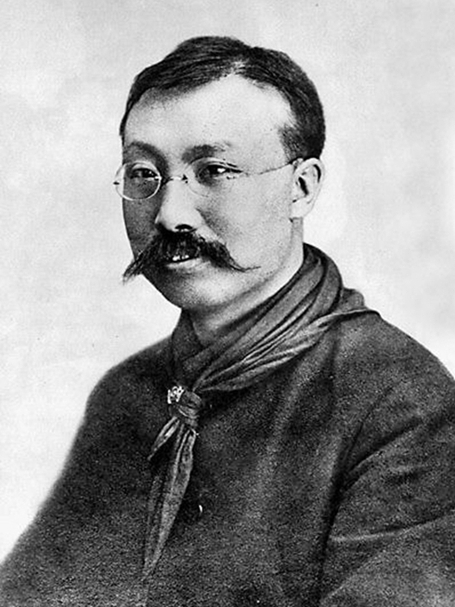
- Li c. 1920

Personal details
- Born: 29 October 1889 Laoting, Zhili, Qing China
- Died: 28 April 1927 (aged 37) Peking, Republic of China
- Cause of death: Execution by hanging
- Party: Socialist Party of China (1912–1913); Chinese Communist Party (1921–1927); Nationalist Party of China (1922–1927)
- Education: Waseda University; Beiyang College of Law and Politics

Chinese name
- Traditional Chinese: 李大釗
- Simplified Chinese: 李大钊
Transcriptions
Standard Mandarin
- Hanyu Pinyin: Lǐ Dàzhāo
- Bopomofo: ㄌㄧˇ ㄉㄚˋ ㄓㄠ
- Wade–Giles: Li^{3} Ta^{4}-Chao^{1}
- Tongyong Pinyin: Lǐ Dà-jhao
- IPA: [lì tâ.ʈʂáʊ]

Courtesy name
- Chinese: 壽昌 守常
Transcriptions
Standard Mandarin
- Hanyu Pinyin: Shòuchāng
- Bopomofo: ㄕㄡˋ ㄔㄤ
- Wade–Giles: Shou^{4}-ch'ang^{1}
- Tongyong Pinyin: Shòu-chang
- IPA: [ʂôʊ.ʈʂʰáŋ]

Li Dazhao (simplified Chinese: 李大钊; traditional Chinese: 李大釗; pinyin: Lǐ Dàzhāo; Wade–Giles: Li Ta-chao; 29 October 1889 – 28 April 1927) was a Chinese intellectual, revolutionary, and political activist who co-founded the Chinese Communist Party (CCP) with Chen Duxiu in 1921. He was one of the first Chinese intellectuals to publicly support Bolshevism and the October Revolution, and his writings and mentorship inspired a generation of young radicals, including Mao Zedong.

Born to a peasant family in Hebei province, Li was educated in modern schools in China and later at Waseda University in Japan. He rose to prominence during the New Culture Movement as the chief librarian and a professor of history at Peking University. In this role, he influenced many student activists and transformed his office into a hub for Marxist discussion. After the May Fourth Movement of 1919, he helped organize some of China's first communist study groups.

Li adapted Marxism to the Chinese context, emphasizing the revolutionary potential of the peasantry and developing a voluntaristic interpretation that stressed the role of conscious political action over strict economic determinism. He theorized that China, as a nation oppressed by imperialism, constituted a "proletarian nation" capable of bypassing a full capitalist stage of development. An ardent nationalist, Li was a key architect of the First United Front between the CCP and Sun Yat-sen's Kuomintang (KMT), arguing that a cross-class national revolution was necessary to defeat imperialism and warlordism.

As the political situation in northern China deteriorated, Li's focus shifted decisively to armed peasant revolt. After the Manchurian warlord Zhang Zuolin seized Beijing, Li took refuge in the Soviet embassy. In a raid on the embassy in April 1927, he was captured by Zhang's forces and executed by hanging. He is honored in CCP historiography as one of the party's founders and a principal revolutionary martyr.

== Early life and education ==
Li Dazhao was born on 29 October 1889, in Daheituo Village, Laoting County, Hebei province. His family were peasants who had accumulated enough capital through trade to become small village landlords. Li was orphaned at a young age; his father died before he was born, and his mother died when he was just over a year old. He was raised by his great-uncle, Li Ruzhen, whom he called grandfather, who ensured he received a traditional education in the Confucian classics. In 1899, in accordance with his grandfather's wish to secure a caretaker for him, the ten-year-old Li was married to the seventeen-year-old Zhao Renlan (Chinese: 赵纫兰), to whom he remained devoted for the rest of his life.

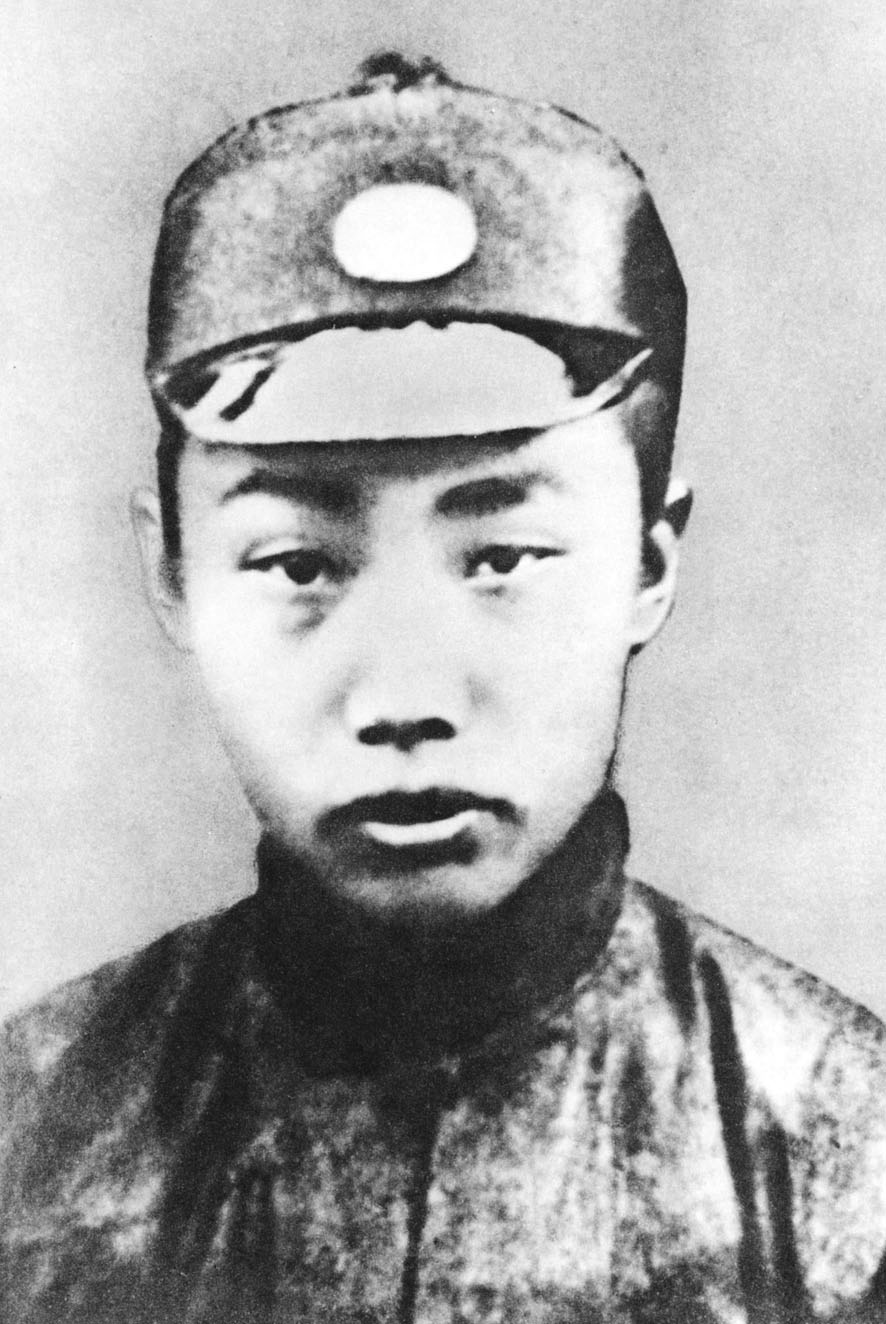
Li at age sixteen, 1905

In 1905, Li passed the county-level examination and enrolled in a modern middle school in Yongpingfu. That same year, the Qing dynasty abolished the traditional imperial examination system, closing the centuries-old path for scholars to enter the state bureaucracy. For Li's generation, a Western-style education became the preferred alternative to a classical one. After graduating in 1907, he enrolled at the Peiyang College of Law and Political Science in Tianjin. He studied there for six years, majoring in political economy and developing a strong desire for a life of public service and political action.

During his time in Tianjin, Li was inspired by the Xinhai Revolution of 1911 but quickly grew disillusioned with the political chaos of the new Republic under Yuan Shikai. He became a student leader in a local movement petitioning for constitutional reform in 1910 and joined the Chinese Socialist Party in 1912. His early political thought was an uncertain mixture of Western liberal constitutional theory and traditional Confucian moral precepts, marked by a populist belief in "the people" as a unified entity whose natural freedom was threatened by the state. Deeply frustrated by the corruption of the new republic, in the summer of 1913 he briefly considered retreating into a Buddhist monastic sect.

== Study in Japan and early nationalism ==
With financial assistance from the constitutionalist politician Tang Hualong, Li left for Tokyo in September 1913 to study political economy at Waseda University. In Japan, he participated in student political groups opposed to Yuan Shikai's increasingly dictatorial regime in China and was impressed by Christian teachings espousing living a virtuous life; he was not religious but later sang Christian hymns with his family. A combination elements from Christianity and traditional Chinese culture influenced Li's adoption of communism.

Li's nationalist sentiments intensified dramatically in 1915, when Japan presented its imperialistic Twenty-One Demands to the Chinese government. He became a leader among Chinese students in Japan protesting the demands, authoring a long manifesto, "A Letter of Admonition to the Elders of the Nation," that was sent to the government in Beijing. In these essays, Li's nationalism took on a chauvinistic tone, exalting China's traditional superiority while attributing its modern plight to foreign influence. This antiforeign sentiment was coupled with a sense of national shame, as Li argued that the Chinese themselves were responsible for their nation's weakness.

Chen Duxiu

During his time in Japan, Li was exposed to a wide range of Western philosophies. The thought of Henri Bergson and Ralph Waldo Emerson had a profound impact on his intellectual development. In a 1915 exchange with Chen Duxiu, Li criticized what he saw as Chen's pessimism and argued, based on Bergson's concept of free will, that individuals with conscious purpose could actively shape reality. Influenced by Emerson's optimistic transcendentalism, Li developed this activist philosophy into a metaphysical worldview in his 1916 essay "Spring" (Chinese: 青春). He presented a dialectical view of history in which the decay and death of the old inevitably contained the seeds of rebirth. He argued that China, though ancient and seemingly moribund, was on the verge of a national regeneration, a rebirth into a "young China" that would emerge from the "corpse" of its old civilization. This rebirth, he insisted, depended on the conscious actions of China's youth in the present.

Armed with this philosophy, Li became impatient with his exile and eager to return to the political struggles in China. In April 1916, as Yuan Shikai's regime began to collapse, he returned to China. He was formally expelled from Waseda University for his long absence, having become deeply involved in the anti-Yuan movement.

== Return to China and the New Culture Movement ==
Upon his return to China in 1916, Li briefly plunged into parliamentary politics in Beijing as an associate of Tang Hualong and the Progressive Party (Chinese: 进步党). He quickly became disillusioned with the opportunism of the politicians, who sought alliances with the dominant Peiyang warlords. He broke with the Progressive Party in October 1916, convinced that constitutional government was unworkable in the warlord era. By late 1917, he had concluded that China's political crisis could not be solved without a revolution.

Frustrated with politics, Li was drawn to the circle of "nonpolitical" intellectuals around Chen Duxiu and the journal New Youth (Chinese: 新青年), the leading organ of the New Culture Movement. In January 1918, Li formally joined the New Youth editorial board. The following month, at the invitation of Cai Yuanpei, the reformist chancellor of Peking University, Li was appointed chief librarian of the university, where Chen Duxiu was serving as dean of letters. In his capacity as librarian and later as a professor of history and economics, Li exerted a significant influence on student radicals. His reforms professionalized the library, making it a center for disseminating new ideas. His young library assistant during the winter of 1918–1919 was Mao Zedong, whom Li introduced to Marxist thought.

=== Other views and analysis ===
Li followed Japanese post-World War I discourse about the idea of pan-Asianism. In Li's view, Japanese pan-Asianism amounted to an Asian Monroe Doctrine based on Japanese imperialism and aggression. Li advocated for a pan-Asianism based on national self-determination and opposition to Japanese aggression.

== Conversion to Marxism ==
=== Influence of the Russian Revolution ===
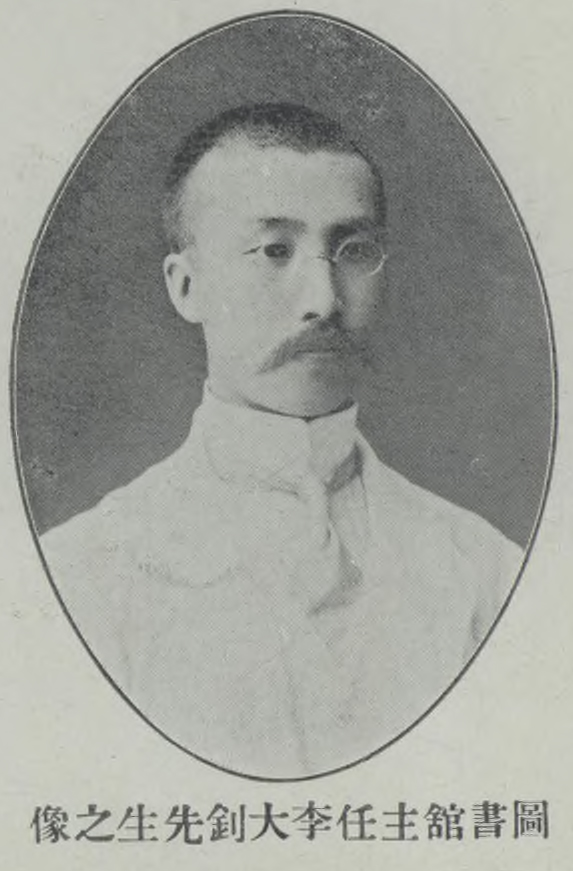
Li in 1917

Li Dazhao was the first major Chinese intellectual to declare his support for the October Revolution in Russia. While other New Culture intellectuals, such as Chen Duxiu, welcomed the democratic February Revolution as a victory for the Allied cause in World War I, Li was skeptical of Western democracy and had little sympathy for the Allies. He saw the events in Russia as a harbinger of a new wave of global revolution. In an article in July 1918, he hailed the October Revolution as a fundamental break with the past, representing a new spirit of "humanism" and internationalism that surpassed the narrow patriotism of the French Revolution.

Li's interpretation was infused with his pre-Marxist philosophy of rebirth. He argued that Russia's economic backwardness was a positive advantage, providing it with "surplus energy" for radical transformation, whereas the advanced Western nations were in a state of decay. This view, which bore similarities to Leon Trotsky's theory of permanent revolution, confirmed Li's own belief that China, being even more backward, was poised for a similar revolutionary leap. In his highly influential article "The Victory of Bolshevism" (November 1918), he proclaimed that the Russian Revolution marked the beginning of a worldwide class war and an irresistible tide of global transformation. He declared that the age of capitalism and imperialism was coming to an end, and that "every place in the world will see the victorious flag of Bolshevism and hear the triumphal song of Bolshevism." Li's response to the revolution was deeply emotional and chiliastic; he saw it as the realization of the millennium in the present, an elemental force that was transforming the entire world order. Li believed that by being geographically and culturally situated at the intersection of Europe and Asia, Russia was the only country capable of "the creation of a new civilization ... that simultaneously retains the special features of Eastern and Western civilizations, and the talents of European and Asian peoples."

=== Populist ideas and "Youth and the Villages" ===
Following his enthusiastic embrace of Bolshevism, Li began to earnestly study Marxism. In late 1918, he organized the first Marxist study group at Peking University, which met secretly in his library office, soon known as the "Red Chamber". As his messianic hopes for imminent world revolution were tempered by the political realities in Europe and China, Li began to search for concrete ways to end the social isolation of the Chinese intelligentsia. His solution was a turn to the peasantry, inspired by the example of the 19th-century Russian Populist (narodnik) movement.

In a series of articles published in February 1919 under the title "Youth and the Villages", Li issued a populist call for China's young intellectuals to go to the countryside to liberate the peasantry. He argued that "China is a rural nation and most of the laboring class is made up of peasants. If they are not liberated, then our whole nation will not be liberated." The urban intellectuals, he declared, had a duty to go to the villages, "unite with the laboring classes," and awaken the peasants from their political stupor. This would not only save the nation but also rescue the intellectuals themselves from the corrupting life of the cities, which he described as "the life of the devil". This populist strain, with its faith in the spontaneous revolutionary energy of the peasants and its anti-urban bias, represented a significant innovation in modern Chinese revolutionary strategy and deeply influenced Li's interpretation of Marxism.

== Co-founder of the Chinese Communist Party ==
=== May Fourth Movement ===
On 1 May 1919, three days before the outbreak of the May Fourth Movement, New Youth published a special issue on Marxism edited by Li. His lengthy article, "My Marxist Views", was the most systematic and serious treatment of Marxism yet published in Chinese. In it, Li presented the basic tenets of orthodox Marxist theory but also expressed his own voluntaristic inclinations. He was drawn to the theory of class struggle, which emphasized conscious political action, but expressed reservations about the economic determinism of the materialist conception of history, arguing that ethical and spiritual factors must accompany material transformation.

The May Fourth protests, which erupted in Beijing in response to the decision at the Paris Peace Conference to cede German concessions in Shandong to Japan, electrified Chinese intellectuals. Li, who had long been suspicious of the Western powers, saw the decision as a confirmation of their imperialistic nature. He became an influential leader of the student movement, and his library office served as a planning center for student activists. According to some accounts, he personally joined the student demonstration on 4 May. The movement unleashed a wave of revolutionary nationalism, political activism, and a search for "total solutions" that made socialist doctrines increasingly popular. The crisis pushed many New Culture intellectuals, including Li's colleague Chen Duxiu, to abandon their "nonpolitical" stance.

=== "Problems and Isms" debate ===
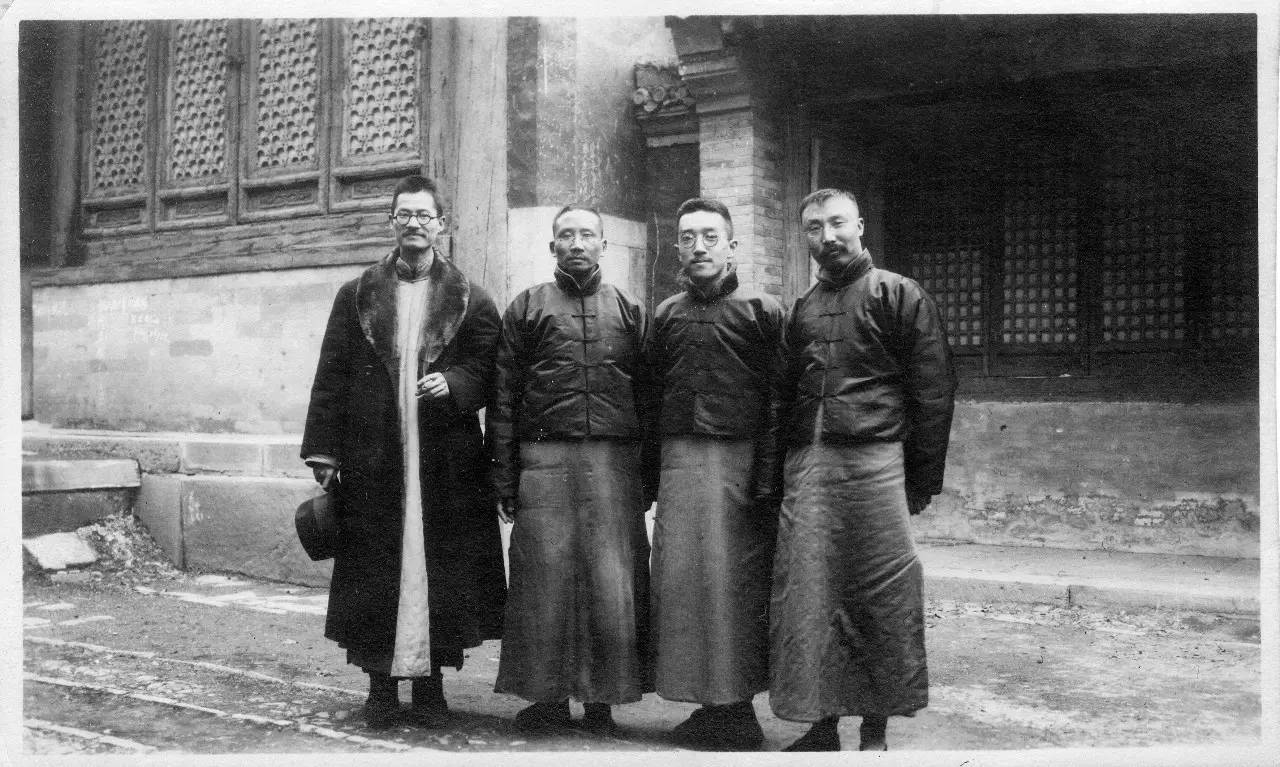
Jiang Menglin, Cai Yuanpei, Hu Shih, and Li in 1920

In the summer of 1919, the liberal intellectual Hu Shih sparked the "Problems and Isms" debate by urging intellectuals to "More study of problems, less talk of isms." Arguing against the growing popularity of doctrines like Marxism, Hu contended that intellectuals should focus on solving individual, practical social problems through gradual, evolutionary reform. Li Dazhao countered that problems could not be solved without a "fundamental solution" to the political structure as a whole. "Isms", he argued, were necessary to provide a "common direction" for a mass movement to achieve this fundamental transformation. The debate was not merely a philosophical one but reflected the split between proponents of evolutionary social reform and those, like Li, who believed in political revolution. In the aftermath of the debate, Li's reservations about Marxist determinism were submerged by his commitment to a revolutionary program of political action.

=== Early organizational activities ===
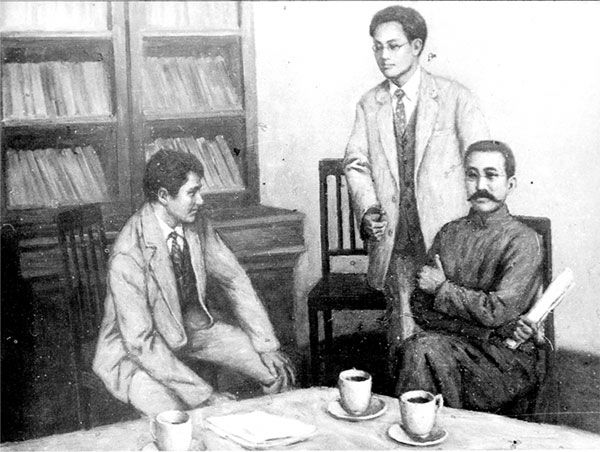
Depiction of Li (right) meeting with Comintern agent Grigori Voitinsky, 1920

The political ferment of the May Fourth era created fertile ground for the organization of communist groups. In early 1920, the Comintern agent Grigori Voitinsky arrived in Beijing and met with Li Dazhao. Li introduced Voitinsky to Chen Duxiu, who established a communist group in Shanghai in May 1920. Li founded a parallel group in Beijing in September or October 1920. This arrangement established the informal leadership structure known as "Ch'en in the South, Li in the North" (Chinese: 南陈北李). These small groups, composed mainly of Li's and Chen's student followers, were the direct precursors of the Chinese Communist Party. In 1921, they turned their group into the Chinese Communist Party. At the 1st National Congress of the Chinese Communist Party in Shanghai in July 1921, Li was unable to attend but was represented by his student Zhang Guotao.

== United Front with the Kuomintang ==
In 1922, the Comintern formally instructed the fledgling CCP to form a united front with Sun Yat-sen's Kuomintang (KMT). The policy was based on the premise that the Chinese Revolution was in its "bourgeois-democratic" phase and required a cross-class alliance against imperialism. Most CCP leaders, including Chen Duxiu, initially opposed the policy. Li Dazhao, however, was a principal and ardent advocate of the alliance. His nationalist-populist worldview made him predisposed to a broad national united front, and in the autumn of 1922, he became the first CCP member to join the KMT as an individual.

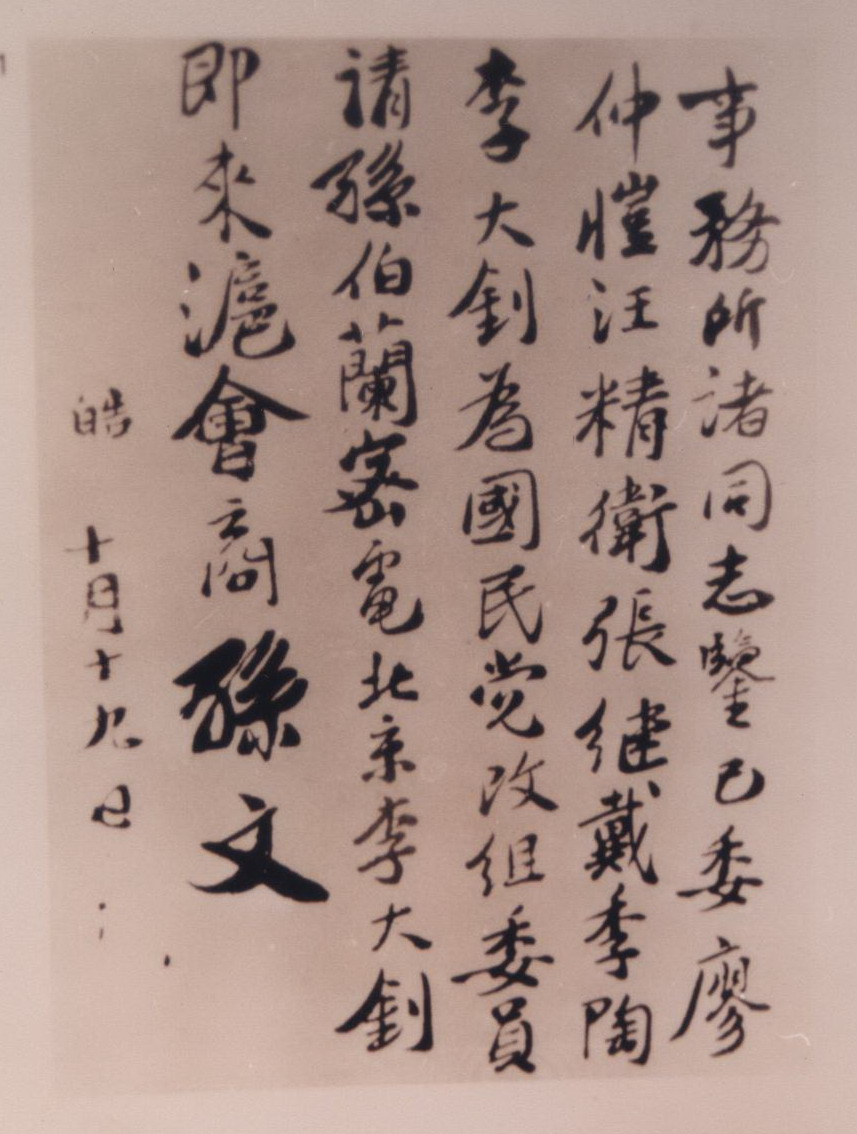
Letter from Sun Yat-sen to Li inviting him to discuss the reorganization of the KMT, 1923

Li played a central role in formalizing the alliance. After meeting with the Comintern agent Maring and Li in Shanghai in August 1922, Sun Yat-sen agreed to allow CCP members to join the KMT. At the KMT's First National Congress in January 1924, Li reassured skeptical KMT members that the Communists were joining to support the "national revolution," not to subvert the KMT. He was elected by Sun Yat-sen to the congress presidium and to the KMT's Central Executive Committee.

Li's interpretation of the alliance differed significantly from that of both the Comintern and Chen Duxiu. While Chen accepted the "bourgeois-democratic" framework and viewed the alliance as a temporary, tactical necessity before an inevitable proletarian revolution, Li saw the national revolution as a permanent, continuous process in which all Chinese people (the "proletarian nation") were centrally involved. He believed it was part of an ongoing world revolution that would merge seamlessly with the global socialist transformation. His voluntaristic and nationalistic views on the revolution led him to stray far from both Leninist orthodoxy and the more deterministic views of his CCP colleagues.

== Later thought and peasant revolution ==
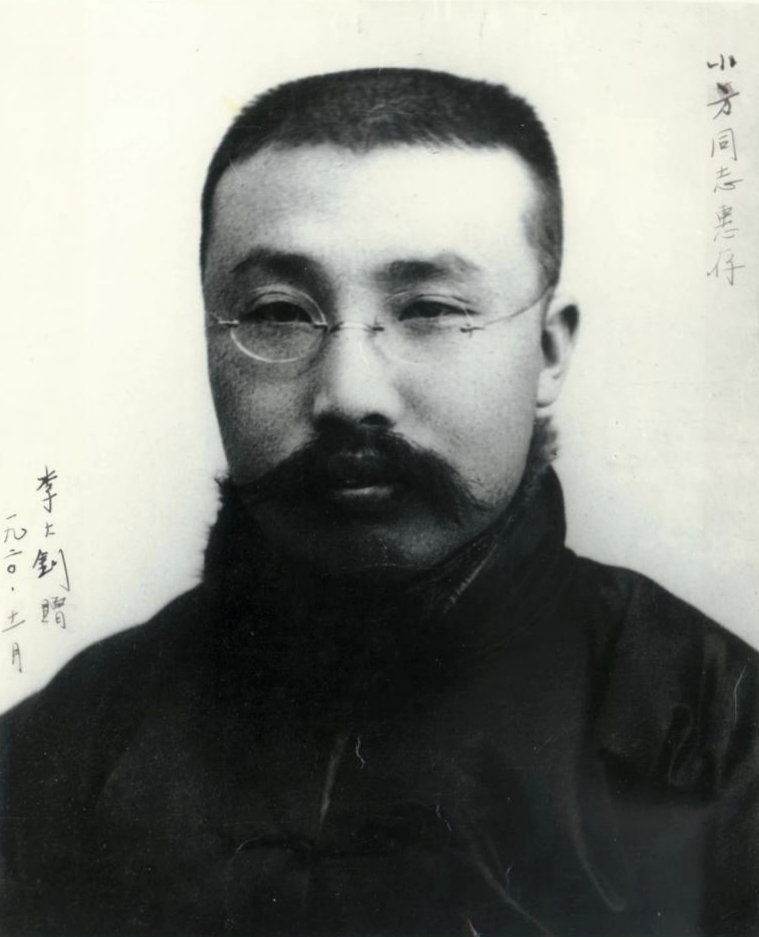
Li in the 1920s

Li's faith in the revolutionary potential of the urban proletariat was never strong. After the brutal suppression of the Beijing–Hankou Railway strike in the February Seventh Incident of 1923, which destroyed the CCP's labor base in northern China, his attention shifted decisively to the peasantry. By the end of 1925, the united front in the north had effectively collapsed due to the dominance of the KMT's right-wing "Western Hills" faction. Confronted with the failure of both the labor movement and the alliance, Li returned to the populist ideas of his 1919 writings.

In his 1926 article on the Red Spear Societies, traditional peasant secret societies that were then leading revolts in northern China, Li embraced armed peasant revolt as the main engine of the Chinese revolution. He argued that the peasantry, by virtue of its spontaneous military organization and class consciousness, was capable of defeating the warlords and imperialists without direction from the cities. He saw the Red Spears as the potential nuclei of a new form of political power and called on young revolutionaries to go to the villages, join these movements, and lead them "out of this vile pit onto the road of brightness." His vision of a revolution based in the countryside and centered on the spontaneous power of the peasantry was a radical departure from both Comintern policy and the views of his fellow CCP leaders, and it prefigured the revolutionary strategy later developed by Mao Zedong.

== Arrest and execution ==
The political situation in Beijing deteriorated throughout 1925 and 1926. After the March 18 Massacre in 1926, in which government troops fired on protestors, a warrant was issued for Li's arrest. He took refuge in the Soviet embassy, where he continued to direct the CCP's clandestine activities in northern China.

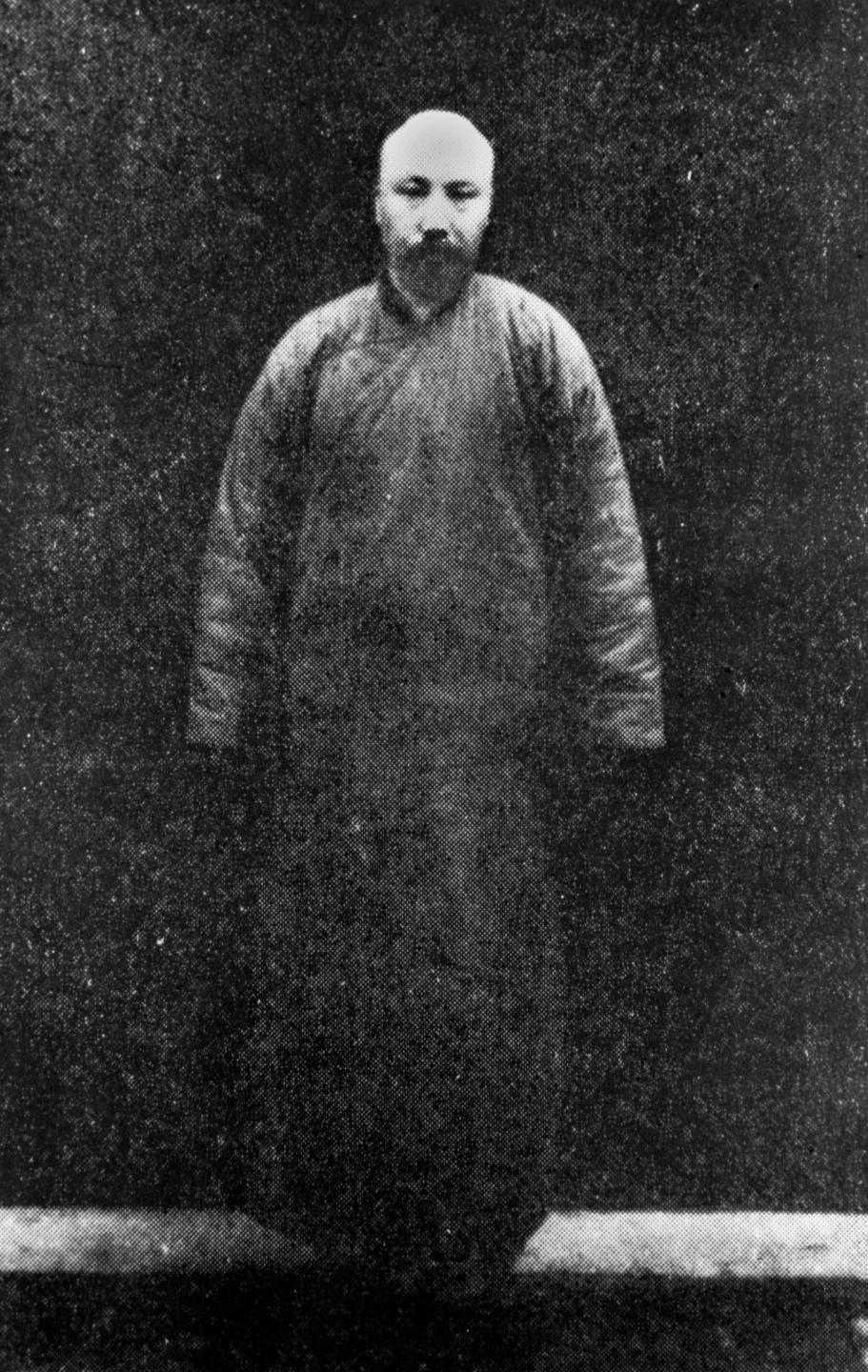
Li shortly before his execution

On 6 April 1927, the Manchurian warlord Zhang Zuolin, who controlled Beijing, ordered a raid on the Soviet embassy with the tacit approval of the foreign diplomatic corps. Li Dazhao, his wife, his daughters, and about sixty other communists and left-wing KMT members were arrested. After a brief trial by a military court, Li and nineteen others were executed by strangulation on 28 April. His execution occurred just weeks after the Shanghai massacre, which marked the violent end of the First United Front and the near-destruction of the CCP.

== Legacy ==
Li Dazhao is honored by the CCP as a heroic revolutionary martyr and the "true founder" of the party. While Chen Duxiu was condemned as a "right-wing opportunist" and a renegade, Li has been consistently glorified in party historiography. His voluntaristic and nationalistic interpretation of Marxism, his populist faith in the revolutionary energy of the Chinese people, and his pioneering focus on the peasantry as the main force of the revolution all became hallmarks of the ideology of Mao Zedong.

Li's intellectual influence on his young library assistant, Mao Zedong, was profound. Li not only introduced Mao to Marxism but also communicated his own chiliastic faith in the October Revolution and his heretical populist ideas. His 1919 call for intellectuals to go to the countryside is seen as having started Mao "on the road to that rediscovery" of the peasantry. Mao's early writings from 1919 faithfully echoed Li's nationalist, populist, and Bolshevik ideas. In their later development of Marxist theory, both Li and Mao prioritized conscious human will over deterministic laws, saw China's backwardness as an advantage for revolution, and blended revolutionary voluntarism with a powerful messianic nationalism that saw China as destined to play a special role in world revolution. Mao himself acknowledged Li's influence, remarking in 1949: "it was in Beijing that I met a great man whose name was Comrade Li Dazhao. Only with his help did I become a communist. He is truly my teacher." In July 2021, Li's grandson, Li Hongta, was awarded the July 1 Medal, the CCP's highest honor, for carrying on the family's "revolutionary tradition".
