= Fu Yiwei =

Chinese actress

- 傅艺伟
- Born: Fu Yiwei (傅意伟); May 26, 1964 (age 60); Harbin, Heilongjiang, China
- Occupation: Actress
- Years active: 1978 - present
- Agent: Minglu Cultural Media Company
- Notable work: The Investiture of the Gods; The Magic Blade
- Spouse(s): Yang Xiaodan (1986 - ?); Gao Du (1990 - 2000)
- Children: Son: Gao Yanan

Chinese name
- Traditional Chinese: 傅藝偉
- Simplified Chinese: 傅艺伟
Transcriptions
Standard Mandarin
- Hanyu Pinyin: Fù Yìwěi

Fu Yiwei
- Traditional Chinese: 傅意偉
- Simplified Chinese: 傅意伟
Transcriptions
Standard Mandarin
- Hanyu Pinyin: Fù Yìwěi

Fu Yiwei (Chinese: 傅艺伟; born 26 May 1964) is a Chinese actress.

Fu is noted for her roles as Daji in the television series The Investiture of the Gods.

Fu has won the Best Actress at the 1st China Film Association, 1986 Xiaobaihua Award for Best Actress and Huading Award for Best Supporting Actress, she received Most Popular Actress Award nomination at the 19th Shanghai Television Festival.

== Life ==
Fu was born Fu Yiwei (傅意伟) in Harbin, Heilongjiang on May 26, 1964.

== Personal life ==
Fu was twice married. Originally wed to Yang Xiaodan (杨晓丹), an actor in Changchun Film Group Corporation.

After a turbulent divorce, she remarried in 1990, her second husband, Gao Du (高度), is a teacher in Beijing Dance Academy, their son, Gao Yanan (高亚男), was born in 1994 and they divorced in 2000.

On March 2, 2016, Beijing police reported Fu was arrested for allegedly sheltering drug users.

== Filmography ==
=== Film ===
Year	Title	Chinese title	Role	Notes
1978	She is from Mist	她从雾中来	Xiao Man	
1983	What a Wonderfull Night	夜色多美好	Hu Ping	
1983	Red Candle with Tears	流泪的红蜡烛	Qiu Ju	
1984	Magical Land	神奇的土地	Shanshan	
1985	Case of Meishan Mountain=	梅山奇案	Chen Lihua	
1985	The Last Empress	末代皇后	Tan Yuling	
1985	Our Demobed Soldier	咱们的退伍兵	Ren Shuixian	
1986	Virgin	贞女	Qing Yu	
1986	Overspeed	超速	Feng Yinan	
1986	Waltz for Women Soldiers	女兵圆舞曲	Pan Fanfan	
1988	Dream in Red Mansions	红楼梦	Xue Baochai	
1989	Kawashima Yoshiko	风流女谍	Yoshiko Kawashima	
1989	Golden Fingernails	金色的指甲	Cao Mei	
1990	The Mysterious Death	死亡内幕	Xiao Jing	
1990	Game Fowl	斗鸡	Sun Chunxi	
1991		周末恋爱角	Wu Xiaolan	
1991	Inside an Old Grave	古墓荒斋	Lian Suo	
1992		爷儿俩开歌厅	Lin Xiaoyi	
1997	Wait Till You Come Back	等你回来	Su Fen	
2003	38°	38度	Businesswoman	
2008		同心	Widow Bai	
2010	Super Player	大玩家	Sister Duan	
2010	Adventure of The King	龙凤店	Empress	
2010		十里红妆	Concubine	
2011	Aeolian Bells	风铃	Xu Jing	
2011		小鬼智多星	Teacher Xue	
2013	The Rooftop	天台爱情	Xin Ai	
2013	White Fox	白狐	Xiaocui's mother	

=== Television ===
Year	Title	Chinese title	Role	Notes
1986	Nurhachi	努尔哈赤	Lady Abahai	
1990	The Investiture of the Gods	封神榜	Daji	
1990	The Ploughman	庄稼汉	Xue Mei	
1991		仙侣传奇	Lotus fairy	
1991	Wu Sangui and Chen Yuanyuan	吴三桂与陈圆圆	Chen Yuanyuan	
1993	Liu Bang	汉王刘邦	Consort Yu/Concubine Qi	
1993		洋行里的中国小姐		
1994	Li Shimin	唐太宗李世民	Yang Ji'er	
1994	Wang Baochuan	王宝钏	Wang Baochuan	
1995		孽海情缘	Guo Xiunu	
1995		律师的使命	Yu Liting	
1995	Hu Xueyan	胡雪岩	Meng Jin	
1995		昨夜长风	Sai Mingjun	
1996	Shen Wansan	江南巨富沈万三		
1997	The Mother-in-law, Daughter-in-law and Sister-in-law	婆婆媳妇小姑	Yu Xiaojiao	
1997		东方风云	Gong Ruyan	
1998		火蝴蝶	Wen Xiuying	
1998	The Story of Macao	澳门的故事	Xu Luwa	
1998	People of Yellow River	黄河人	Hongliu	
1999	My Husband	小丈夫	Li Huimei	
1999	Metropolis Emotion	都市情感	Lan Yueying	
2000		红粉家事	Lingling	
2000	Pretty Twins	绝色双娇	Empress Dowager Zhang	
2000		Kang Xiaoyu		
2001		情义英雄武二郎	Pan Jinlian	
2001		宰相小甘罗	Zi Xi	
2001		刘秀救母	Wan'er	
2001	Beijing Holiday	北京假日	Liang Xiaobing	
2001	You are in my life	一路上有你	Yi Fei	
2001		英雄离去的岁月		
2002	Pretty Twins 2	绝色双娇2	Empress Dowager Zhang	
2002	Eight Immortals	笑八仙之素女故事	Xi Wangmu	
2002		天上掉下个林妹妹	Sheng Naiping	
2002	Celebrating Mother's Birthday	新五女拜寿	Liang Nuanxue	
2003	The Story of Three Loves	啼笑因缘	Mrs. Tao	
2003		大马帮	Mrs. Dong	
2003	Ming Dynasty	大明王朝惊变录	Lan Xin	
2004	Love At Aegean Sea	情定爱琴海	Zhou Meiling	
2004	Not in the Scene of the Crime	不在犯罪现场	Xu Yingjuan	
2004		巡城御史鬼难缠	Miss Ba	
2005	March	烟花三月	Xin Yao	
2006	Concubines of the Qing Emperor	大清后宫之还君明珠	Concubine	
2006	Beautiful Dreamer	美丽追梦人	Li Lu	
2007		紧急链接	Xiang Bing	
2007	Justice Bao	新包青天之打龙袍	Concubine Liu	
2008	Dad	爸爸不容易	guest	
2008		拯救之非常地带	Zhao Huimin	
2008	The Doctrine of Women	妇道2	Ye Jiajia	
2009	The Most Familiar Stranger	最熟悉的陌生人	Editor Chang	
2009		有泪悄悄流	Han Siyang	
2009	Qimei	七妹	Xiu Ying	
2009	Chinese Family	中国式亲情	Hu Caiju	
2010	Don't lie to me	别对我说谎	He Xiurong	
2010	The Legend of Chinese zodiac	十二生肖传奇	Xi Wangmu	
2010	Love Song of Xikou	西口情歌	Mother Pu	
2011		给水团	He Caicai	
2011	The Legend of Chu Liuxiang	楚留香新传	Hua Jin'gong	
2011	Invincible Knights Errant	七侠五义人间道	Empress Dowager Liu	
2011		香山奇缘	Empress Miaozhuang	
2012	The Magic Blade	天涯明月刀	Nangong Xie	
2012	My Sun	我的太阳		
2012		大侦破	Wan Meiqi	
2012	Female Interpol: Li Chunchun	女刑警李春春	Du Xueqin	
2012	Destiny by Love	非缘勿扰	Lu Xinlan	
2013		红酒俏佳人	Mother Shen	
2013	Moment in Peking	新京华烟云	Aunt Du	
2014	Wine Beauty	红酒俏佳人	Mother Shen	
2014	The Virtuous Queen of Han	卫子夫	Wei Ao	
2014		婆媳的战国时代	Liu Shanshan	
2015	Singles Villa	只因单身在一起	Zhou Meiren	
2015	Love Yunge from the Desert	大汉情缘之云中歌	Mother Meng	
2016	Legend of Du Xinwu	杜心五传奇	Mother Du	
TBA	My Wife's Sisters and I	我和我的小姨子们		

== Awards ==
Year	Work	Award	Result	Notes
1981		1st China Film Association - Best Actress	Won	
1986		Xiaobaihua Award for Best Actress	Won	
2012	The Magic Blade	Huading Award for Best Supporting Actress	Won	
2013		19th Shanghai Television Festival - Most Popular Actress	Nominated	
