= Women Speak =

1988 literary article by Xiang Ya

- Traditional Chinese: 女十人談
- Simplified Chinese: 女十人谈
- Literal meaning: Ten women speak
Transcriptions
Standard Mandarin
- Hanyu Pinyin: Nǚ Shí Rén Tán

Women Speak is a 1988 Chinese article written by Beijing-based Xiang Ya (向娅) about sexual revolution in the country as it "opened up". The piece includes supposedly "tape-recorded" interviews of 10 anonymous urban women in their 30s and 40s, who discussed their highly private love/sex lives and thoughts. It was translated to English by Diana B. Kingsbury in her 1994 translated anthology I Wish I Were a Wolf.

Women Speak was adapted into a 1989 film Golden Fingernails directed by Bao Zhifang.

== Author ==
Zhao Shaoling (赵绍玲), who used the pen name Xiang Ya, was born in 1951 in Lingshou County, Hebei. In 1969, as part of the Down to the Countryside Movement she was "sent-down" to Inner Mongolia where she worked for 3 years in a rural army unit. In 1974, she was transferred to an electrical equipment plant in Beijing, after which she found employment with the National Library of China. She attended night school and graduated with a degree in Chinese literature in 1985. She published her first article in 1984.

== The interviews ==
Each interview reads like a long monologue, with the interviewer barely present. No names are mentioned. Like the author, all interviewees in the 30s were "sent-down" to work in the countryside during the Cultural Revolution.

- Woman A ("Her husband had a lover, but it worked out in the end"), a 36-year-old physician who graduated from medical school in 1983 along with her husband, with whom she has a loving relationship and great sex life. When she discovered her husband's affair 8 years into the marriage, she was not hurt, instead she felt calm and confident. She gently talked to him, said she understood and asked for only honesty. Her magnanimity greatly relieved him, who gratefully returned her trust. She also talked to and comforted his lover. Three years later, the younger woman married well, and she is very happy for both marriages.
- Woman B ("Her husband's rising fame fed her fear"), a 35-year-old factory worker from a peasant background. Before their marriage, she persistently and unabashedly courted his love. The years right after the wedding were blissful, but recently she has become paranoid about his possible infidelity. Afraid of the attention he gets, she doesn't want him to write or dress up. She stalks him, opens his mail, confronts women around him, and visits his boss, but still feels anxious. He no longer has sex with her, but she'd rather have that than discover his affair. She has access to poison and is ready to kill him if he cheats.
- Woman C ("She said, 'We are two independent planets, both free to come and go'"), a 39-year-old company assistant manager. Her first marriage fell apart quickly. Her husband cheated on her, so she did the same to him. Two years later, she fell in love with someone and filed for divorce. Her husband refused. Crying and begging, he even surprised her and her lover at night, but she protected her lover from his beating. On the wedding of her second marriage, she pronounced that if one "wants a divorce, the other must not refuse". She believes this made her new hubby value their relationship. They are very happy.
- Woman D ("Conventional love for her is not enough"), a 46-year-old department vice-director in a publishing house. She has no problems with her husband—except for sex. As he isn't able to satisfy her, she starts a clandestine affair with a married man who is good in bed. She also has no desire to divorce her husband, a point she made very clear to her lover. Actually, she believes the affair helps her marriage, as she can now vent her sexual frustration periodically without getting angry at her husband. She also believes adulterous sex more exciting and satisfying, another reason she's maintaining the status quo.
- Woman E ("She fell in love with a married man"), a 38-year-old middle-school teacher. Her sex life during marriage was terrible, but she took a long time to leave him. After the divorce, she fell in love with a man already separated from his wife for 3 years. Still, she was called a homewrecker and received a disciplinary warning from her job. Without a marriage license, they are also turned away by most hotels. But she believes she did nothing wrong and continues to love him. When he was falsely diagnosed with cancer, she stayed in the hospital with him for 21 days. Eventually, people around her became more understanding.
- Woman F ("A woman set on conquering men"), a 34-year-old charity organizer. Extremely ugly, she was abused by her parents and brother growing up. She craves for love, but no man paid her attention. Finally, she swore vengeance. In 1981, she began the first non-governmental charity organization, and quickly achieved fame and success. During a TV interview, she was overcome with emotions and fainted. She began to have handsome suitors, but her "desire for revenge subsumed any sexual feeling". She repeated rejected two charming men. Now she has a stable, plain-looking male partner, but doesn't want to marry.
- Woman G ("Love and sex are two different things"), a 38-year-old actress-turned-film director. Because she lost her virginity before marriage, her ex-husband treated her poorly, often beating her up during sex. Initially submissive, she became more confident and developed feminist ideas after working as an actress. After the divorce, her career took off, and she started dating again with the intention of remarrying, but only met frivolous men. Disgusted, she has decided that she will never remarry, but she will not give up sex. She despises men, but still leads an active sex life without any commitment.
- Woman H ("Without love, she had to turn him down"), a 43-year-old teacher who lost her husband in a terrible accident 5 years ago. Though she has missed him, she is ready to remarry. Two years ago, a good male friend made advances towards her in his apartment, but she rejected him. Although he was still married, he had been separated for years from his wife, who had gone abroad. So they were both independent, sexually experienced and very lonely, but it still didn't "feel right", as if something was missing. She has come to realize how important love is to her, and she "can't have sex without love".
- Woman I ("She wants a child but doesn't want to get married"), a 34-year-old lower-level cadre in an office. She is not interested in men and has no desire to marry, but wants to have a child. The family planning official finds her unbelievable, but she cites the marriage law as granting equal civil rights for children out of wedlock. She is also frustrated that the government has not allocated a large apartment for her, only because she is single. "Why not judge us based on what we've done for society rather than on our marital status?... Why can't I be accorded my proper rights?" She asks angrily.
- Woman J ("A woman preoccupied with proving her virginity"), a 37-year-old company section chief. During middle school, she accidentally broke her hymen riding a bike. At age 17, she was "sent-down" to rural Shaanxi, where she witnessed the tradition of new brides holding high blood-stained cloth the morning after their weddings to prove that they had been virgins. Since then, she has been terrified she won't bleed if she has sex, and this anxiety effectively keeps her a virgin. Gradually all men lose interest in her, and she has stubbornly vowed to remain a virgin for the rest of her life, having learned to masturbate.

== Reception ==
Li Xiaojiang wrote that Women Speak "did not incite a whirlwind when it appeared in 1988 because, for most intellectual and career women, a base of social equality and group consciousness had already been laid".

== Adaptation ==
In Golden Fingernails, the experiences of four of these women (A, C, E, and F) are interwoven into one story.
