= Jennifer Cody Epstein =

American writer

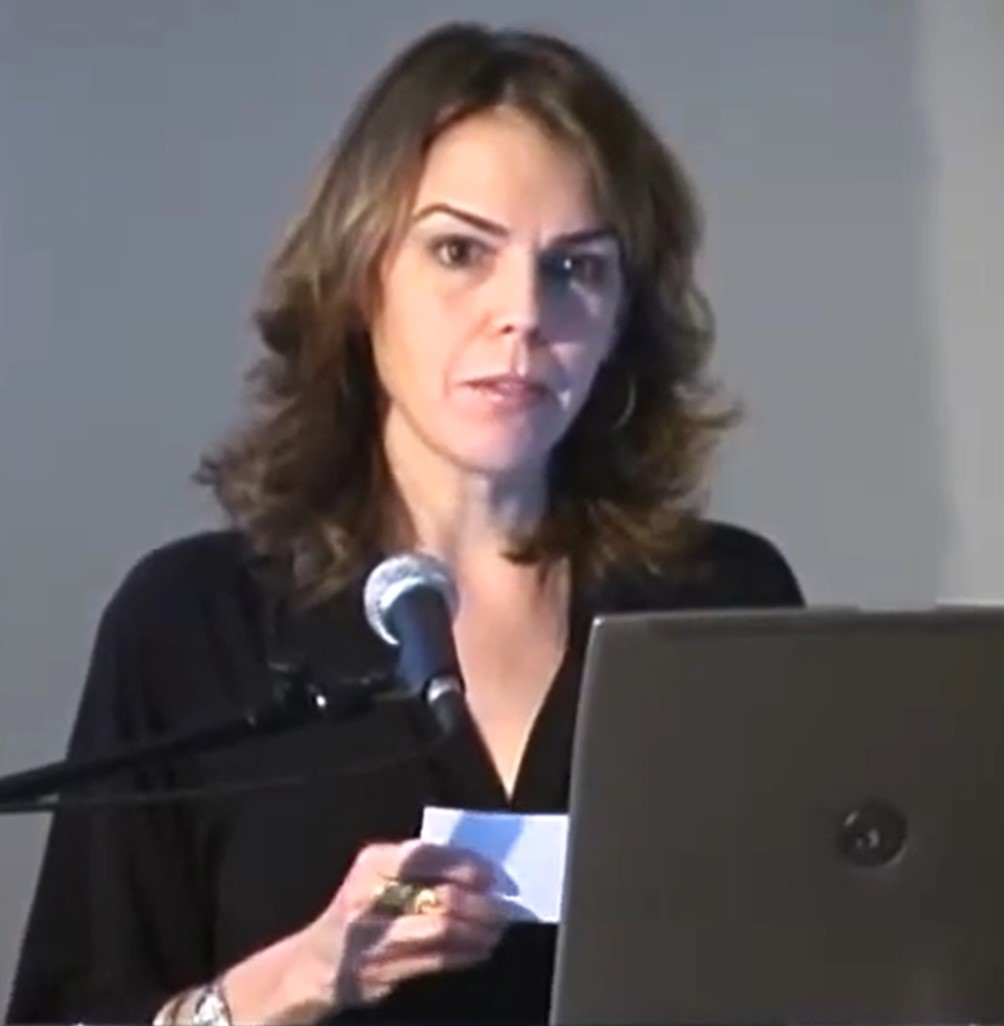
Epstein speaks at the Elizabeth A. Sackler Center for Feminist Art in 2011

Jennifer Cody Epstein is an American author.

== Life ==
Epstein resides in New York City. She has a Master of Fine Arts degree in Fiction from Columbia University, a Masters in International Relations from Johns Hopkins and a bachelor's degree in Asian Studies and English from Amherst College.

She has written for Lit Hub, McSweeney's, Bookriot, The Wall Street Journal, The Asian Wall Street Journal, The Nation (Thailand), Self, and Mademoiselle magazines. Epstein has also worked in Tokyo and Kyoto in Japan, where she's lived for over five years as a student, teacher, and journalist, as well as in Hong Kong and Bangkok. She was a finalist for the 2024 Edgar Award for Best Novel, was long listed for the 2020 Simpson/Joyce carol Oates Literary Prize, and was awarded the 2014 Asia Pacific American Librarians Association Honor Award for fiction. She currently teaches at Stony Brook University, where she directs the MFA Program in Creative Writing. She has also taught at Columbia University in the United States, and internationally at Doshisha University in Kyoto, Japan.

Epstein’s debut novel, The Painter from Shanghai, is the fictionalized biography of Pan Yuliang who lived from 1895 to 1977. Pan was a female Chinese painter who was influential in bringing Western painting styles to China. It took Epstein ten years to complete the novel, which, she noted, “is not a factual account of Pan Yuliang’s life, [it is] a re-imagining.” Epstein did much research, helping her to accurately portray the characters and the period. The novel was an international bestseller, published in 14 countries.

Her second novel, The Gods of Heavenly Punishment, is a fictional work exploring America's 1945 firebombing of Tokyo from both Japanese and American perspectives, but especially from that of young Yoshi Kobayashi. In the book, Yoshi has to struggle with the destruction of her city, life, love and secrets. This novel was a work of fiction that allowed Epstein to return to her fascination with Japan, where she had been first an exchange student, then a journalist.

Her third novel, Wunderland, was inspired by actual events. It is set in Nazi Germany, postwar Germany and 1980's New York City, told through the lens of two close childhood friends torn apart by World War II. It was roughly inspired by Melita Maschmann's 1963 memoir "Account Rendered," in which Maschmann details her girlhood infatuation with National Socialism, and her devastating betrayal of a close friend who was Jewish.

Epstein's fourth novel, The Madwomen of Paris, is set in the Salpêtrière asylum during a hysteria "epidemic" at the end of the 19th Century. Praised as "beautifully crafted" and "a haunting narrative that showcases Epstein at her best" by Publishers Weekly, and "a fascinating look back at a condition with modern-day resonance" by Science Magazine, the book explores the treatment and public presentation of Salpêtrière hysterics, as well as the hypnosis and research performed upon them by the pioneering neurologist Jean-Martin Charcot and the medical luminaries—including Sigmund Freud, Josef Babinski and Georges Gilles de la Tourette—who studied under him. It was a finalist for the Edgar Award for Best Novel in 2024.
