= Wu Jing (actress) =

Chinese actress (born 1949)

- Born: 1 July 1949 (age 76); Jiangsu, Republic of China
- Education: Nanyang Model High School
- Occupation: actress
- Years active: 1975–present
- Spouse: Zhang Yuan
- Parent(s): Wu Fuhai (father); Pan Wenzheng (mother)

Chinese name
- Traditional Chinese: 吳竞
- Simplified Chinese: 吴竞
Transcriptions
Standard Mandarin
- Hanyu Pinyin: Wú Jìng

Wu Jing (born 1 July 1949) is a Chinese actress. She starred in many films in the 1980s and 1990s. She is also known for her roles in many popular TV series, like Sinful Debt (1995) and The Story of a Noble Family (2003).

== Biography ==
Both of Wu Jing's parents Wu Fuhai (吴福海) and Pan Wenzheng (潘文铮) were in the People's Liberation Army when she was born near the end of the Chinese Civil War. Wu Jing grew up in Shanghai, and after graduating from Nanyang Model High School in the Cultural Revolution, was "sent-down" to work in Yuyao and later Dafeng County. Despite passing all qualification tests Wu was repeatedly denied entry to art troupes only because her parents were labeled "Capitalist roaders" during the time. It wasn't until 1975 that she landed a supporting role in the propaganda film Breaking with Old Ideas. She became an affiliated actress with the Shanghai Film Studio only in 1984.

In May 2013, Wu Jing was voted one of the 9 vice-chairpeople of the Shanghai Film Association.

== Personal life ==
Wu Jing and her husband Zhang Yuan (张元) appeared in many films together, such as Clown's Adventure (1990).

== Filmography ==
=== Films ===
Year	English title	Original title	Role	Notes
1975	Breaking with Old Ideas	决裂	Xiao Ping	
1980	Foggy City	霧都茫茫	Zhu Yuwan; Zhu Yuwen	
1980	An American Pilot	一个美国飞行员	Chen Yingdi	
1981	Hope Over the Ocean	海望	Lin Qi	
1982	Devotion to the Sky	魂系蓝天	Tao Tao	
1983	A Wife's Letter	妻子的信	Du Li	
1983	Strange Encounters	漂泊奇遇		
1984	The Wooden Shed	木屋		
1984	Lost Song	失去的歌声	Qiu Ping	
1985	Apartment	公寓	Wang Wei	
1985	Sunrise	日出		
1986	The Man Who Stopped the Hearse	拦灵车的人	Mei Yuying	
1987	Anonymous Phone Calls	匿名电话	Rugui	
1987	Let the Smile Come Back	回来吧！微笑	Chen Huan	
1987	War Sends the Women Away	战争让女人走开	Liao Yonghui	
1988	The Third Man in Her Life	第三个男人	Li Jia	
1988	Between Life and Death	生死之间	Yindi	
1989	Porn Freak	夜幕下的黄色幽灵	Zhao Yuanchun	
1989	Golden Fingernails	金色的指甲	Ye Xin	
1990	Absurdities in a City	江城奇事	Yang Jie	
1990	Clown's Adventure	小丑历险记	Ye Lu	
1991	Midnight Horror	夜半惊魂	Shu Qianyun	
1991	Rippling Love	情海浪花	Wanlin	
1992	Caiyue and Her Lover	彩月和她的情人	Caiyue	
1993	Romance in Metropolitan Shanghai	都市情话	Zhao Peihong	
1994	Xian Xinghai	冼星海	Huang Suying	
1996	Emergency	紧急救助	Lin Hui	
1998	The Soul of the Sea	海之魂	Ge Lan	
1998	The Third Connection	第三条线	Yu Jia	TV film
2000	Sunshine Days	家在树德坊	Zhuo Liying	
2000	The First Intimate Contact	第一次的親密接觸		
2001	Fidelity	兄弟		
2005	Everlasting Regret	长恨歌	Wang Qiyao's mother	
2012	All for Love	三个未婚妈妈		
2015	Yun Shubi	云曙碧	Yun Shubi	

=== Drama series ===
Year	English title	Original title	Role	Notes
1988	The Legendary Madame	传奇夫人	Huang Yijiao	
1992	The Little House and the Big World	小屋子与大世界	Jiang Sitao	
1993	Before and After Divorce	离婚前后	Han Yueguang	
1994	Love in Pearl River	情满珠江		
1995	Sinful Debt	孽债	Yang Shaoquan	
1995	Butterfly Orchid	蝴蝶蘭	Fang Dan	
1995	Shanghai Story	上海故事	You Baojue	
1996	Rose Rain	蔷薇雨	Xu Ermei	
1996	Sisters from the Same Hometown	同乡姐妹	Liu Ximei	
1996	Love, Sword, Mountain, River	情劍山河	Zhou Zong's wife	
1996	The Breakthrough	大轉折	Soong Mei-ling	
1997	Dream Angel	夢幻天使	Bai He	
1997	Relentless Years	岁月无情	Hongfei	
1997	You're Happy, So I'm Happy	你快乐所以我快乐		
1997	Land and People of the Orient	东方热土东方人	Gu Ruowen	
1997	Happenings in the Qin Family	秦家风波	Zhou Ying	
1998	The Kingdom and the Beauty	江山美人	Empress Dowager Zhang	
1998	Sequel to the Water Margin	水滸後傳	Ximen Jinge's mother	
1998	General Zhang Xueliang	張學良將軍	Soong Mei-ling	
1999	Wuya's Legend	烏丫傳說	Yin Xueyan	
2000	The Romance of Western Chamber	西廂傳奇		
2001	Romance in the Rain	情深深雨濛濛	He Shuheng's mother	
2001	Hidden Crime	潜罪	An Suxian	
2001	Mother-in-law and Daughter-in-law War	婆媳过招	Fang Yazhu	
2001	Love Over a Millenium	情越千年		
2001	Magpies Flying Southeast	喜鹊东南飞	Zhao Jie	
2002	The Tragic Red and Black	悲情红与黑		
2002	The Curtain Rises and Falls	幕起幕落		
2002	Before and After Marriage	婚前婚后		
2003	The Story of a Noble Family	金粉世家	Jin Quan's wife	
2003	The Hometown of Golden Apples	这里盛产金苹果	Sheng Hongpei	
2003	Affair of Half a Lifetime	半生緣		
2003	My Family Tree	亲情树		
2003	Painting Soul	畫魂		
2003	Divine Vessel	神舟	Fang Mingxia	
2004	By Chance	偶然		
2004	The Execution of Chen Shimei	新鍘美案	Empress Dowager Liu	
2004	The Big Dye-House	大染坊	Lu Jiaju's mother	
2004	The Return to Shanghai Bund	重返上海灘	Yao Lichun	
2004	Beachhead in Shanghai	抢滩大上海	Zhen Yini	
2005	Golden Age	金色年華		
2005	Ruan Lingyu	阮玲玉	Zhang Damin's mother	
2005	Threshold of Spring	早春二月		
2005	The Golden Cangue	金鎖記		
2006	Colourful Years	炫年华	Xin Zhi's mother	
2006	General Shi Lang	施琅大將軍	Queen Dong	
2006	Primacy Tea House	第一茶莊	Wang Qingshun	
2007	War and Dust	戎馬煙塵		
2007	Rich Man Poor Love	钻石王老五的艰难爱情	Ye Hailin	
2008	Golden Dusk	金色黄昏	Gao Yunxiang	
2008	A Poem for the Oak	相思树	Shang Jie's mother	
2008	The Fortune of a Beauty	红颜的岁月	Zhang Jiajun's mother	
2008	Blood War	风雨雕花楼		
2009	Parted Lives Never Parted Love	天涯咫尺	Lin Huiru	
2009	A Husband and Wife	夫妻一场	Zhang Wanhua	
2009	Behind the Kindness	善良背后	Fang Huimin	
2009	Going South	南下		
2010	Happy Mother-in-Law, Pretty Daughter-in-Law	歡喜婆婆俏媳婦	Consort Dowager Xun	
2010	Sinful Debt 2	孽债2	Yang Shaoquan	sequel to the 1995 series
2010	The Legend of Crazy Monk	活佛濟公	Dong Zhongqing's mother	
2011	Murong Lian	紅塵麗影		
2011	Born Ready	天生我才		
2012	My Ten-Year War with Mother-in-Law	我和丈母娘的十年战争	Huo Da's mother	
2012	Angel Heart	心术	Huo Simiao's mother	
2012	Arrows on the Bowstring	箭在弦上	Xu Yihang's mother	
2013	When Innocence Meets Reality	天真遇到现实	Yang Tianzhen's mother	
2014	Rose in the Wind	婦道	Zhou Yongjia's mother	
2015	Dragon Dad	爸爸是条龙		
2015	Extremely Urgent	迫在眉睫	He Taiyan's wife	
2016	The Love of Happiness	因为爱情有幸福	Grandma Zhang	
TBA	Infinite Love for Chinese Parents	親親中國爹娘		

== Awards and nominations ==
Year	#	Award	Category	Work	Result
2001	21st	Golden Rooster Awards	Best Actress	Sunshine Days	Nominated
