= The Investiture of the Gods (1990 TV series) =

- Also known as: The First Myth
- Chinese: 封神榜
- Hanyu Pinyin: Fēngshén Bǎng
- Genre: Epic fantasy, Chinese mythology, Gods and demons fiction
- Based on: Fengshen Yanyi
- Written by: Bing Tian, Gu Hanchang, Ouyang Yuping, Yu Youchen
- Directed by: Guo Xinling
- Starring: Lan Tianye; Da Qi; Fu Yiwei; Lei Changxi
- Opening theme: Mao Amin The legend of God (《神的传说》)
- Ending theme: Alan Tam The Myth of Ancient (《千古神话》)
- Country of origin: China
- Original language: Mandarin
- No. of episodes: 36

Production
- Cinematography: Wang Shenghua, Dai Wenhua, Xie Hailiang, Zhang Jiayu

The Investiture of the Gods (Chinese: 封神榜) is a 1990 Chinese shenmo television series written by Bing Tian, Gu Hanchang, Ouyang Yuping and Yu Youchen. The television series are based on the classical 16th-century novel Fengshen Yanyi (also known as Investiture of the Gods or Creation of the Gods) written by Xu Zhonglin and Lu Xixing.

== Cast ==
- Da Qi as King Zhou of Shang
- Lan Tianye as Jiang Ziya
- Fu Yiwei as Daji
- Lei Changxi as Shen Gongbao
- Zhang Xiaolin as King Wu of Zhou
- Wei Qiming as King Wen of Zhou
- Tong Chun Chung as Bo Yikao
- Xu Ya as Queen Shang
- He Wei as Nezha
- Li Jianhua as Erlang Shen
- Ji Zhenhua as Bigan
- Qiao Qi as Shang Rong
- Shi Zhengquan as Wen Zhong
- Zhang Fei as Jizi
- Rebecca Chan as Nüwa
- Li Weizeng as Weizi
- Lu Ling as Queen Jiang
- Sun Jihong as Pipa Jing
- Xia Shasha as Hu Ximei
- Yao Peihua as Concubine Yang
- Zhou Xianli as Concubine Huang
- Zhou Guosheng as Yin Jiao
- Fu Chong as Yin Hong
- Duan Shiping as Dou Fengzhen
- Deng Liguo as Zhang Guifang
- Zhang Yingxiang as Jiang Huanchu
- Ding Qi as Jiang Wenhuan
- Shen Guangwei as Chong Houhu
- Yao Mingde as Chong Heihu
- Li Xinlong as E Chongyu
- Wang Zhengwei as Huang Feihu
- Xu Yong as Huang Tianhua
- Liu Anji as Li Jing
- Yu Huadong as Tu Xingsun
- Jin Ming as Deng Chanyu
- Yao Mingrong as Deng Jiugong
- Li Changnian as Su Hu
- Wang Jinxiang as Zhang Kui
- Cai Jinping as Gao Lanying
- Wei Min as Chao Tian
- Tan Jiabin as Chao Lei
- Yu Jian'guo as Huang Ming
- Chen Yingming as Huang Gun
- Guo Hai as Huang Tianxiang
- Zhu Weizhong as Leizhenzi
- Wang Haidi as Jinzha
- Zhou Ming as Muzha
- Wu Huibiao as Wu Ji
- Li Xinlong as San Yisheng
- Wang Ruoli as Tai Si
- Liu Changwei as Ji Xian
- Weng Guojun as Ji Sui
- Yuan Zhiyuan as Old Man of the South Pole
- Fang Yang as Yuding Zhenren
- Zhang Hongxin as Taiyi Zhenren
- Sun Jixiang as Daode Zhenjun
- Deng Liguo as Guangchengzi
- Yang Zhaoshu as Juliusun
- Chun Guang as Wenshu Guangfa Tianzun
- Lu Ye as Yunzhongzi
- Gu Yan as Huoling Shengwu
- Huang Weiliang as Zhao Gongming
- Qu Ailing as Yunxiao
- Xu Jinli as Bixiao
- Sun Li as Qiongxiao
- Qin Zhen as Duobao Daoren
- Yu Minzhen as Ma Zhaodi (Jiang Ziya's wife)
