= Pan Yuliang =

Chinese female painter

- 潘玉良
- Born: Chen Xiuqing; 14 June 1895; Yangzhou, Jiangsu, Qing Empire
- Died: 22 July 1977 (aged 82); Paris, France
- Resting place: Montparnasse Cemetery
- Other names: Zhang Yuliang; Pan-Zhang Yuliang
- Education: Shanghai Fine Arts School; Institut franco-chinois de Lyon; École nationale supérieure des beaux-arts de Lyon; Beaux-Arts de Paris; Accademia di Belle Arti di Roma
- Occupations: Painter; sculptor; educator
- Spouse: Pan Zanhua (m. 1913; died 1959)
- Awards: Female Nude receives the Roman International Art Exhibition’s Gold Prize; Paris Gold Prize; L'art Libre Confédération Française. Salon International Prize; Gold Medal, French Cultural Education Prize; Arts-Sciences-Lettres Prize

Chinese name
- Traditional Chinese: 潘玉良
Transcriptions
- Website: www.panyulin.org

Pan Yuliang (Chinese: 潘玉良; 14 June 1895 – 22 July 1977), born Chen Xiuqing, was a Chinese painter, sculptor and educator, known for being the first woman in China to paint in the Western style. She studied in Shanghai, Lyon, Paris and Rome, and taught at the École des Beaux Arts. She is one of the earliest Chinese women to receive formal instruction in Oil Painting and Life Drawing. After that, she developed a distinctive hybrid style, which made the combination between European modernist techniques and Chinese traditional pictorial sensibilities. Recent scholarship recognized Pan as one of the most important modern Chinese woman artists, who discussed the East and West culture tensions, and the gender expectations during that time.

In 1985, much of her work was transported to China, and collected by the National Art Museum in Beijing and the Anhui Museum in Hefei. Despite being remembered for introducing Western paintings to China, she also provided a new lens to how women were seen through her paintings, not just as objects but as subjects. In her works, she extensively used the female nude, which is unusual and controversial. Later, scholarship interpreted this as the way Pan asserted women's agency and subjectivity in a male-led art world. She won several awards for her work and exhibited internationally in Europe, the United States, and Japan. Significant paintings, sculptures, and prints by her are still conserved in France in the collection of the Cernuschi museum. Her life as an artist has been portrayed in novels, films, and operas in China and the United States. Her art evolved within the flux of conflicting dichotomies of East and West, tradition and modernity, male chauvinism and emerging feminism. Pan is also remembered as an artist who engaged with labels, such as "contemporary/modern," "Chinese," and "woman" artist, while also questioning them.

== Life ==
=== Early life ===
She was born Chen Xiuqing on 14 June 1895 in Yangzhou. Her father died when she was one and her mother died when she was eight, Chen was adopted by her maternal uncle and renamed Zhang Yuliang (Chinese: 張玉良). Her uncle, who was a gambling addict and to clear his debt, later sold her to a brothel in Wuhu when she was around 13 years old. She ran away, and during this time she attempted suicide multiple times, tried to disfigure her face, and was beaten on multiple occasions, before finally becoming a singing girl.

In 1913 Pan was 18 years old when her freedom was bought by Pan Zanhua (Chinese: 潘赞化; 1885–1959), a customs official and member of the Tongmenghui. They had a simple and quiet marriage as witnessed by Chinese thinker Chen Duxiu. Pan became either Zanhua's second wife or his concubine and later adopted his family name of "Pan". (Note: A legal document outlining her will to family members was signed "Pan-Zhang Yuliang" (Chinese: 潘張玉良). Pan-Zhang Yuliang is the name that she acknowledged and preferred.)

According to recent scholarship, Pan's early background as a courtesan profoundly influenced her later perceptions and contributed to social prejudice against her, particularly as an artist in China during that time. However, the other scholarship and public make a different view of her early life, which is the foundational narrative that frames her art. Her life contributes a “phoenix-like” mythos, which rises in adversity.

=== Education ===
Pan moved to Shanghai with her husband In 1916, where she learnt to read and write. In 1920, Pan passed the exams to enter the Shanghai Art School, where she studied painting with Wang Jiyuan. Within the Shanghai Art School, Pan struggled to fit in with her peers. Due to her "lowly" background, she was often ostracized and did not fit into the model of the "modern Shanghai lady" — a young woman whose arts education added to their femininity and beauty. Pan was frequently described by her peers as "warm-hearted and forthright", albeit "blunt" at times. Pan Yuliang was one of the first women to graduate from the Shanghai Art School.

Pan studied at the Shanghai Art School, where she was placed among the earliest cohort of Chinese women. This experience led Pan to receive formal training in Western painting and drawing. This experience can be viewed as a development that reflects new opportunities for women in early twentieth-century China.

After graduation, she went to Lyon and Paris for further study, sponsored by her husband Pan Zanhua. She attended the Sino-French Institute of Lyon and Ecole National des Beaux Arts in Lyon, before finishing her studies at the Ecole National Supérieure des Beaux Arts de Paris. In 1925, she won the prestigious Rome Scholarship to study at the Accademia di Belle Arti in Rome in Italy. In Rome, she studied under Umberto Coromaldi.

Pan's experience in France and Italy exposed her to contemporary Modern European movements and the academic practice of live models. These experiences deeply shaped Pan's work in the female nude. After Pan's studies in Europe and Pan's return to China, Pan became a pioneer who worked on synthesizing Chinese and Western artistic traditions.

=== Career and later life ===
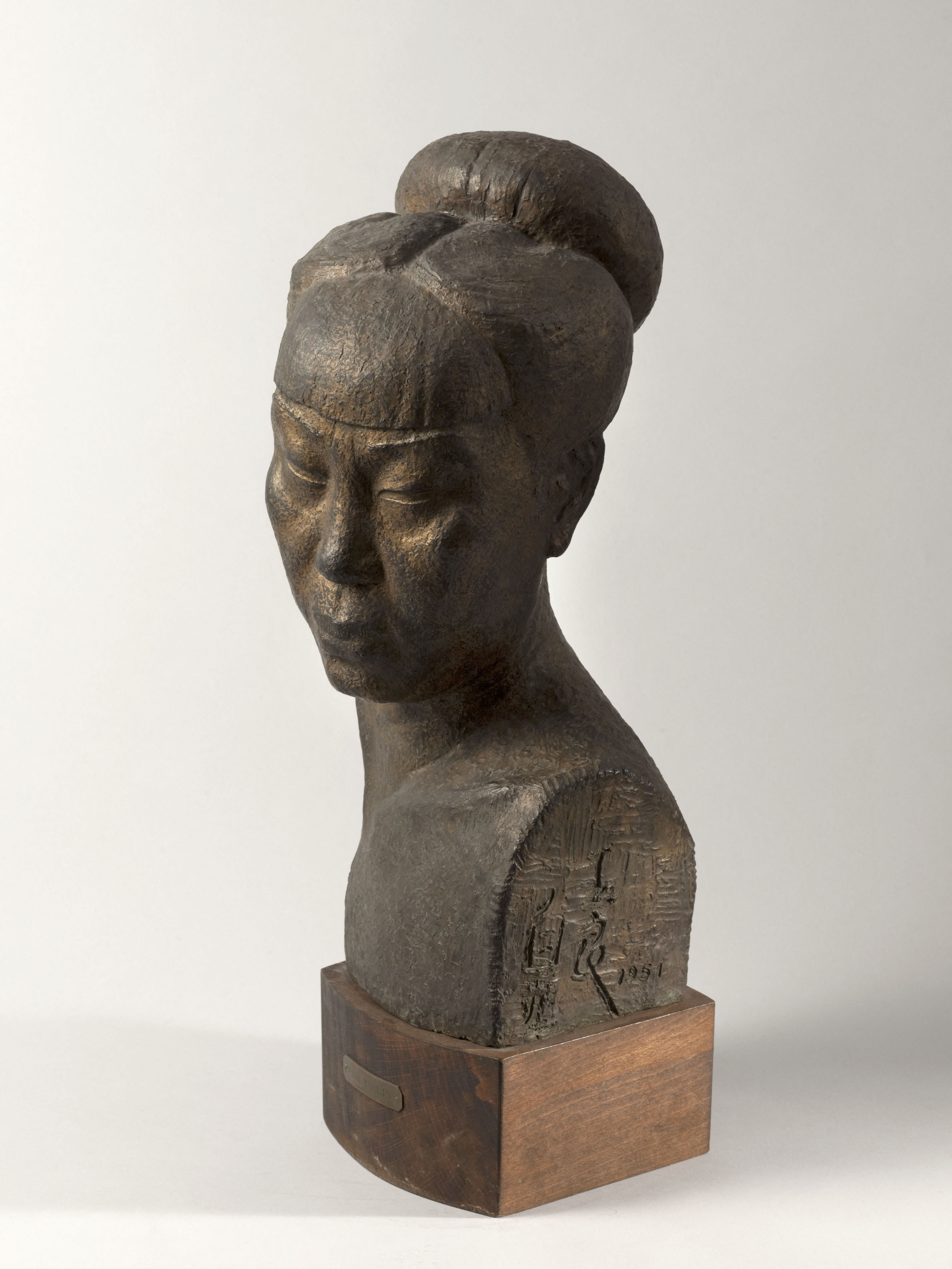
Self-portrait. Bronze, 1951. Musée Cernuschi

In 1926, Pan Yuliang won the Gold Prize for her works at the Roman International Art Exhibition. In 1929, she was invited by Liu Haisu to teach at the Shanghai Art School, leading to her return to China. She was honored as the first Chinese female artist to paint in the Western style, and received five solo exhibitions in China from 1929 to 1936. She was also invited to be an art professor of the National Central University in Nanjing. Pan Yuliang's work was harshly criticized by government officials and conservative critics - largely due to her depictions of female nudes. Many Scholars pointed out that people living in Republican China had broader anxieties about women entering public artistic spaces. Especially challenging the social moral norms through the nude.

Despite the controversy, Pan gained favor in the art world of the Republic of China (1912 – 49), alongside fellow female painter Guan Zilan, for their embodiment of modernity. In China, women artists were generally constricted to depictions of nature and, occasionally, portraiture, but nudes were considered improper. Despite this, Pan continued to depict female nudes, often using herself as a model. In Pan's art, Pan often used her own body to paint and conceive. This behavior may be understood as a strategy of self-fashioning. This is the start of a movement: the female agency has been shown in a male-led visual culture.

Apart from her nude works, Pan was known for seamlessly incorporating Chinese ink painting techniques into Western styles, and drew praise for the ability of her ink paintings to subtly undermine the authority of the European art traditions.The combination of Western oil and Chinese compositional sensibilities by Pan formed a hybrid visual language central, which shows in Pan's artistic identity.

In 1937, Pan left Shanghai for France and settled in Paris. She joined the faculty of the École des Beaux Arts, and was elected as chairman of the Chinese Art Association. Her works were exhibited internationally, especially in the United Kingdom, United States, Germany, Japan, Italy, Switzerland, Belgium, and Greece. It was following her move to France that her work drew widespread acclaim, though she kept her Chinese nationality despite living in France for almost fifty years. Despite the recognition, Pan experienced poverty and difficulty selling her art. She refused to be bound by contractual obligations with art dealers in Europe. Pan's behavior, refusing to be bound, reveals that she desires to maintain artistic autonomy. She did not want the financial issue to affect her art. Pan's choice led to her being marginalized in the French Art Market.

Towards the end of her life, Pan became marginalized from both the Chinese and French art communities; in China, her contributions to Chinese modern art were overlooked due to her long absence from the country, while in Paris, she was categorized as a Chinese and foreign painter, thus excluding her from mainstream art appreciation.In the late years in Paris, solitude pervades all of life. However, the solitude also continued her commitment to painting, which reflects a modern woman finding identity in exile.

In 1960 she received news that her husband had died after a long illness, she broke down and became seriously ill. Pan died in 1977 and was buried in the Montparnasse Cemetery of Paris. In 1985, many of her works were returned to China and are now held by the National Art Museum of China in Beijing and the Anhui Provincial Museum in Hefei.

== Artistic style and themes ==
Pan's art is characterized by a hybrid visual language, which combines Western academic training and traditional Chinese pictorial. Pan's exposure to traditional European art, especially her academia in Lyon, Paris, and Rome, increased her ability in oil painting, anatomical accuracy, and the academic nude. The Chinese ink painting affects her emphasis on line, contour, and brushwork. This blending of Pan's art has been considered "a dialogue between traditions". Her unique art language emphasized how Pan crossed cultural boundaries through European academia and traditional Chinese linearity. This unique hybrid visual language may be considered a transcultural negotiation. Pan built a bridge between two different art systems instead of only accepting one art system.

The main theme, shown in Pan's art, is the representation of the modern female self. Pan constructed the modern female through pose, costume, and compositional framing. Pan expresses autonomy, dignity, and psychological presence by often using her own body as a model. Especially her self-portraits. Pan mainly focused on designing the foreground clothing, gesture, and expression in her self-portraits to explore identity and self-fashioning in her life in Republican China and Europe. Other scholars viewed Pan's self-portraits as a "borderless identity", which reflects that she does not fully belong to either Chinese or French artists. This transformation enabled her to develop distinct art languages and produce a greater body of work. According to art historian Sandy Ng, Pan Yuliang signed her paintings simply as “Yuliang,” omitting her adopted surname, “Pan.” Ng also notes that Pan frequently elongated the final stroke of the Chinese character liang in her signatures.

The female nude painting is one of the most significant aspects of Pan's oeuvre and has also attracted extensive scholarly attention. "Maternal ambivalence" has been a recurring theme in her significant art, which explores the emotional and psychological relationships among mothers, children, and female figures. Her art also refuses to describe sentimental motherhood, but rather draws Pan's psychological images, which reflect her personal experiences and the shifting gender norms in Republican China.

In the nude drawing, Pan's approach is different from that of the male artists. People may see vitality, corporeality, and women's self-possession in Pan's work. People never view these points before in male artists' work, which is common eroticizing tendencies. Women are always confident and have agency, and they are brave to face the viewer. Pan draws the positive beauty instead of passive beauty, which is the hallmark of her feminist visual language.

The art painting techniques, which combine Western and traditional Chinese elements, are a defining feature of her art style. This style not only exists beyond fixed categories but also reinforces her position as a transcultural modernist.

In her analysis of Pan Yuliang's Nude in Red Qipao (1955), art historian Sandy Ng examines the relationship between clothing, bodily freedom, and changing representations of modern Chinese women. The painting depicts a partially undressed woman wearing a red qipao, looking downward while holding her raised leg. Ng interprets the contrast between the woman's composed expression and her exposed body in relation to contemporary expectations of femininity and respectability. Ng also discusses Reclining Nude Woman (1959), emphasizing Pan's treatment of the figure's physical presence and the challenges of depicting female nudity within conservative social conventions.

== Legacy and honors ==
- 1926, her works won the Gold Prize at the Roman International Art Exhibition.
- 1959, she won the Paris Gold Prize and the Belgium Silver Prize.

The Anhui Museum holds a collection of Pan Yuliang's works of art, including 4000 pieces, 3892 sketches, 393 ink paintings, 361 oil paintings, 13 block prints, 6 engravings, and 4 sculptures. Only ten of her oil paintings are on the market, leading to high valuations. Since 2000, the record price for this artist at auction was $4,451,802 USD for Nude by Window, sold at Poly Auction Hong Kong Limited in 2014.

== In popular culture ==
In 1989, an eight-part television series was broadcast based on Pan's life.

Her life story was also re-enacted in the 2004 TVB drama Painting Soul where her role was played by Michelle Reis. The Huangmei opera The Female Painter from the Brothel (風塵女畫家), starring Ma Lan, is also based on her life.

Her story is loosely told in the novel Hua Hun (A Soul Haunted by Painting) (1984) by Shih Nan. Later, It was adapted as a Chinese film directed by Huang Shuqin, A Soul Haunted by Painting which was released in 1994, starring the actress Gong Li as the artist.

Jennifer Cody Epstein's internationally bestselling novel The Painter from Shanghai (2008) is also based on Pan Yuliang's life, and has been translated into sixteen languages. Epstein, who worked as a journalist in Hong Kong and China, spent ten years writing and researching the book.

Marie Laure de Shazer, who specialized in Chinese language, also wrote a book about Pan Yuliang, Pan Yu Liang, La Manet de Shanghai, based on her life in China and France.
