= Educated Youth (novel) =

Book by Ye Xin

- cover of the English translation published by Giramondo Publishing
- Author: Ye Xin
- Original title: '孽债'
- Translator: Jing Han (2016)
- Language: Chinese
- Set in: 1990s Shanghai & Xishuangbanna Dai Autonomous Prefecture
- Published: 1991
- Publication place: China

Educated Youth
- Traditional Chinese: 孽債
- Simplified Chinese: 孽债
- Literal meaning: Sinful Debt
Transcriptions
Standard Mandarin
- Hanyu Pinyin: Nièzhài
Wu
- Romanization: Nyih Tsa

Educated Youth is a 1991 Chinese novel by Ye Xin. It was translated to English by Jing Han in 2016.

Ye also wrote the teleplay of a highly successful TV adaptation Sinful Debt (1995), which shattered ratings record in Shanghai.

== Translations ==
- English: Educated Youth. Translated by Jing Han. Giramondo Publishing. 2016.
- Vietnamese: Nghiệp chướng. Translated by Trịnh Trung Hiẻ̂u. Thé̂ Giới. 1997.

In 1998, Ian Chapman also translated an excerpt (Chapter 2, Part 4) to English on the magazine Renditions, under the title The Wages of Sin.

== Historical background and Ye Xin's novel ==
It was utterly ridiculous for us to think of settling there permanently. It was a lie.

— Ye Xin, in a 1988 interview with Laifong Leung, translated by Leung

Ye Xin was just one of tens of millions of Chinese urban teens "sent down" to the countryside in the 1960s and 1970s as part of the Down to the Countryside Movement. Although many set out the journey with revolutionary fervor, their naive idealism were crushed by realities of the hardscrabble rural lives too different from what they were used to. With no prospect of a better future in sight, many of these urban youths got married, had children and settled down in villages. Everything changed in 1976 with the death of Mao Zedong and the arrest of the Gang of Four. Soon after, these rusticated "youths" (now in their 30s) were allowed to return to cities, to reunite with their parents and try to be something other than peasants—only if they were single. In many cases, those that were married had to divorce their spouses and abandon their children for a chance to return to their native cities.

Sinful Debt was first serialized between 1991 and 1992 in the literary magazine Fiction World (小说界). It was first published in book form in 1992 by Jiangsu Literature and Art Publishing House (江苏文艺出版社). After the broadcast of the TV series, the novel was reprinted several times in 1995 and broke several book sales record.

The novel is based on true stories of abandoned children going to cities searching for their birth parents, and Ye Xin created believable situations that most highlighted the melodrama and tragedy associated with such reunions. The narrative not only contrasted the 2 generations, but also illustrated the differences between Shanghai and Xishuangbanna Dai Autonomous Prefecture — one densely populated, industrialized coastal metropolis, and one heavily forested rural town on the border with Myanmar, settled mostly by non-Chinese people. As Michael Berry pointed out, the tragedy "represents not only the delayed consequences of the past but also a repetition of the past". Just like their parents more than 20 years ago, the teens began the long journey with optimistic yearnings, only to "discover heartbreak, disillusionment, and tragedy".

== Adaptation ==
- Sinful Debt (1995), directed by Huang Shuqin
