= Golden Fingernails =

1989 film

- Chinese: 金色的指甲
- Hanyu Pinyin: Jīnsè de Zhǐjiā
- Directed by: Bao Zhifang
- Written by: Zhang Chongguang; Lan Zhiguang
- Based on: Women Speak by Xiang Ya
- Produced by: Shen Rumei
- Starring: Fu Yiwei; Wang Hui; Zhang Min; Guo Yuan; Wu Jing
- Cinematography: Shan Lianguo
- Edited by: Ge Haidi
- Music by: Liu Yanxi
- Production company: Shanghai Film Studio
- Release date: 1989
- Running time: 102 minutes
- Country: China
- Language: Mandarin

Golden Fingernails is a 1989 Chinese drama film directed by Bao Zhifang, loosely based on 4 of the 10 interviews in Xiang Ya's 1988 work Women Speak.

The film focuses on the romantic relationships of 4 fashionable urban women in the same office, 3 of whom are involved in an extramarital relationship.

== Plot ==
Cao Mei (Fu Yiwei) is single, but is in a relationship with her coworker Zhu Datong (He Zhengjun), who is married with a young son. She hopes Zhu can divorce his wife Liu Xin (Wu Jing) but Zhu is hesitant. One day, Liu discovers Zhu's affair, but instead of throwing a fit she calmly assures Zhu that she understands, forgives and still loves him. Intending to have a final showdown with Liu, Cao arrives at Zhu's house but is also shocked by Liu's magnanimity. She leaves Zhu for good and eventually gets together with coworker Liu Da (Zhang Kang'er), who has been courting her all along.

Shen Xiuwen (Zhang Min) is a divorced woman who lives with her mother and young daughter. She is in love with an older married man Qiu Zeyun (Mi Zeng). Qiu's estranged and confrontational wife Xiang Jiying (Ruan Lili) arrives at the office and makes a scene, but Shen is adamant she will not leave Qiu because she knows Qiu loves her and not Xiang. Qiu is hospitalized with a stomach tumor, and Shen attends to him faithfully while Xiang grants him the divorce. Eventually Qiu's tumor is found to be benign, and Shen is ecstatic that she is able to start a new family with Qiu.

Yu Xiaoyun (Guo Yuan) is a woman suffering from self-esteem issues because she is ugly. She believes men are too shallow and thus will not love her. She tries to start a "body-advertisement" company in the city, but getting sponsorship and funds involves talking to different CEOs—all men—which disgusts her. Not surprisingly, she fails to recruit any sponsor. Meanwhile, Su Yafen (Wang Hui) is devastated when she discovers her husband Peng Quanhong (Jiang Cheng) is cheating on her. Yu helps Su regain her spirit and asks Su to talk to the CEOs for her. Su, who is prettier, gets a number of deals done which further depresses Yu. Su also begins a relationship with a CEO Tian Sang (Yang Hongwu) and no longer cares about Peng's affair. She eventually marries Tian, presumably after divorcing Peng.

In front of a TV camera, Yu confesses that the reason she wants to start a company is to draw attention to herself because no man wants her. Subsequently, two men make advances towards her, but she rejects them. She finally gets together with an umbrella repairer she meets on the street, who does not speak a word in the film.

== Cast and characters ==
Actor	Character	Archetype in Women Speak
Wu Jing	Ye Xin	Woman A
He Zhengjun	Zhu Datong	Woman A's husband
Fu Yiwei	Cao Mei	lover of Woman A's husband
Wang Hui	Su Yafen	Woman C
Jiang Cheng	Peng Quanhong	Woman C's first husband
Yang Hongwu	Tian Sang	Woman C's second husband
Zhang Min	Shen Xiuwen	Woman E
Mi Zeng	Qiu Zeyun	Woman E's lover
Ruan Lili	Xiang Jiying	wife of Woman E's lover
Guo Yuan	Yu Xiaoyun	Woman F

== Reception ==
The film was screened at the 1991 Créteil International Women's Film Festival, where Bérénice Reynaud wrote the film's "corny mixture of soap-operatic dialogues and Chinese urban culture baffled everybody".
