= Li Hongta =

Chinese politician

- 李宏塔

Vice Chairman of the Anhui Provincial Committee of the Chinese People's Political Consultative Conference
- In office 30 January 2008 – January 2013
- Chairman: Yang Duoliang

Personal details
- Born: May 1949 (age 77) Beijing, China
- Party: Chinese Communist Party
- Relations: Li Dazhao (grandfather)
- Parent: Li Baohua
- Education: Hefei University of Technology
- Awards: July 1 Medal (2021)

Li Hongta (Chinese: 李宏塔; pinyin: Lǐ Hóngtǎ; born May 1949) is a retired Chinese politician who served as vice chairman of the Anhui Provincial Committee of the Chinese People's Political Consultative Conference from 2008 to 2013. He was a member of the 11th, and 12th National Committee of the Chinese People's Political Consultative Conference.

== Biography ==
Li was born in Beijing, China in May 1949, to Li Baohua, former governor of the People's Bank of China, and Tian Yingxuan (田映萱), former deputy director of Beijing Textile Bureau. His grandfather Li Dazhao was a communist revolutionary imprisoned by the Beiyang government for spreading Marxism and Communism in China and one of the founders of the Chinese Communist Party (CCP). He enlisted in the People's Liberation Army (PLA) in August 1965 and joined the CCP in April 1978. During the Cultural Revolution, he was a worker at the chlorination workshop of Hefei Chemical Plant. In September 1973, he was accepted to the Hefei University of Technology, where he majored in the Department of Electrical Engineering. After graduating in September 1976, he continued to Hefei Chemical Plant as a technician.

He entered politics in 1978, when he was appointed deputy secretary of Hefei Municipal Committee of the Communist Youth League, two years later, he was promoted to secretary, and became a member of the standing committee of the Hefei CCP committee, the city's top authority. In 1983, he was appointed deputy secretary of Anhui Provincial Committee of the Communist Youth League. In June 1987 he became the deputy head of Anhui Provincial Department of Civil Affairs, rising to head in the next year. On 30 January 2008, he was elected vice chairman of the Anhui Provincial Committee of the Chinese People's Political Consultative Conference.

== Personal life ==
Li has a son named Li Rougang (李柔刚).

== Awards ==
- 2021 July 1 Medal

Government offices
Preceded by ?	Head of Anhui Provincial Department of Civil Affairs; 1998–2008	Succeeded by Liu Jian
