= A Soul Haunted by Painting =

- Film poster
- Directed by: Huang Shuqin
- Written by: Min Anqi; Huang Shuqin; Li Ziyu; Liu Heng; Zhang Yimou; Shi Nan (novel)
- Produced by: Gilles Thompson; Tu Yu-Ling; Yu Benzheng; Yu Shu; Zhang Pengcheng
- Starring: Gong Li
- Cinematography: Lü Yue
- Edited by: Cheung Kwok-Kuen
- Music by: Liu Yuan
- Production company: Shanghai Film Studio
- Release date: 12 March 1994 (Hong Kong)
- Running time: 130 minutes
- Country: China
- Language: Mandarin

A Soul Haunted by Painting (Chinese: 画魂; pinyin: huàhún) (also known as Soul of a Painter and Pan Yu Liang (Pan Yuliang), a Woman Painter) is a 1994 Chinese film starring Gong Li and directed by Huang Shuqin.

It is loosely based on the life of Pan Yuliang, a former prostitute turned painter.

== Restoration ==
In 2017, the Shanghai International Film Festival (SIFF) announced that they would be remastering the film. This film restoration was performed by the Shanghai Film Technology Plant, under guidance by the original cinematographer Lü Yue. The remastered version of A Soul Haunted by Painting was shown at the following year's SIFF in June 2018.
