= Wu Tianyi =

Chinese medical scientist

- Born: Ismail Salimjan; 25 June 1935 (age 91); Yita Circuit, Sinkiang Province, Republic of China
- Education: China Medical University (Liaoning)
- Awards: July 1 Medal (2021)
- Scientific career
- Fields: Cardiovascular and cerebrovascular disease
- Workplaces: Qinghai Institute of Plateau Medical Sciences

Chinese name
- Simplified Chinese: 吴天一
- Traditional Chinese: 吳天一
Transcriptions
Standard Mandarin
- Hanyu Pinyin: Wú Tiānyī

Wu Tianyi (Chinese: 吴天一; born Ismail Salimjan on 25 June 1935) is a Chinese medical scientist best known for his research in combatting against altitude sickness and his medical research in the Tibet Autonomous Region. He is of Tajik (Pamiri) ethnicity, and is the only Tajik member of the Chinese Academy of Engineering.

== Biography ==
Wu was born Ismail Sailimujiang to an intellectual Tajik family in Yita Circuit, Sinkiang Province (present-day Taxkorgan Tajik Autonomous County, Xinjiang Uygur Autonomous Region), on 25 June 1935. Later, his family moved to Nanjing, where he received his Chinese name Wu Tianyi. In 1951, he was accepted to the China Medical University (PRC), where he graduated in 1956. In January 1957, he was despatched to the 512 Hospital of People's Volunteer Army with his wife, and worked there until September 1958. Then he went to the PLA 516 Hospital in northwest China's Qinghai province. He was transferred to Xining No.1 People's Hospital and appointed head of the Internal Medicine Department. In January 1979, he became deputy director of Qinghai Plateau Heart Disease Institute, and held that office until February 1983. He joined the Chinese Communist Party in May 1982. In January 1984, he moved to Qinghai Institute of Plateau Medical Sciences, where he successively served as deputy director, director, and president. In 2019, he was employed as a member of the Academic Department of the Chinese Academy of Medical Sciences.

== Personal life ==
Now all his relatives live in the United States.

== Honours and awards ==
- 1987 State Science and Technology Progress Award (Third Class)
- 2001 Member of the Chinese Academy of Engineering (CAE)
- 2006 Science and Technology Progress Award of the Ho Leung Ho Lee Foundation
- 2007 State Science and Technology Progress Award (Second Class)
- 2008 7th China Guanghua Engineering Award
- 2014 Wu Jieping Medical Award
- 2021 July 1 Medal
