= Ye Xin (writer) =

Chinese writer

- 叶辛
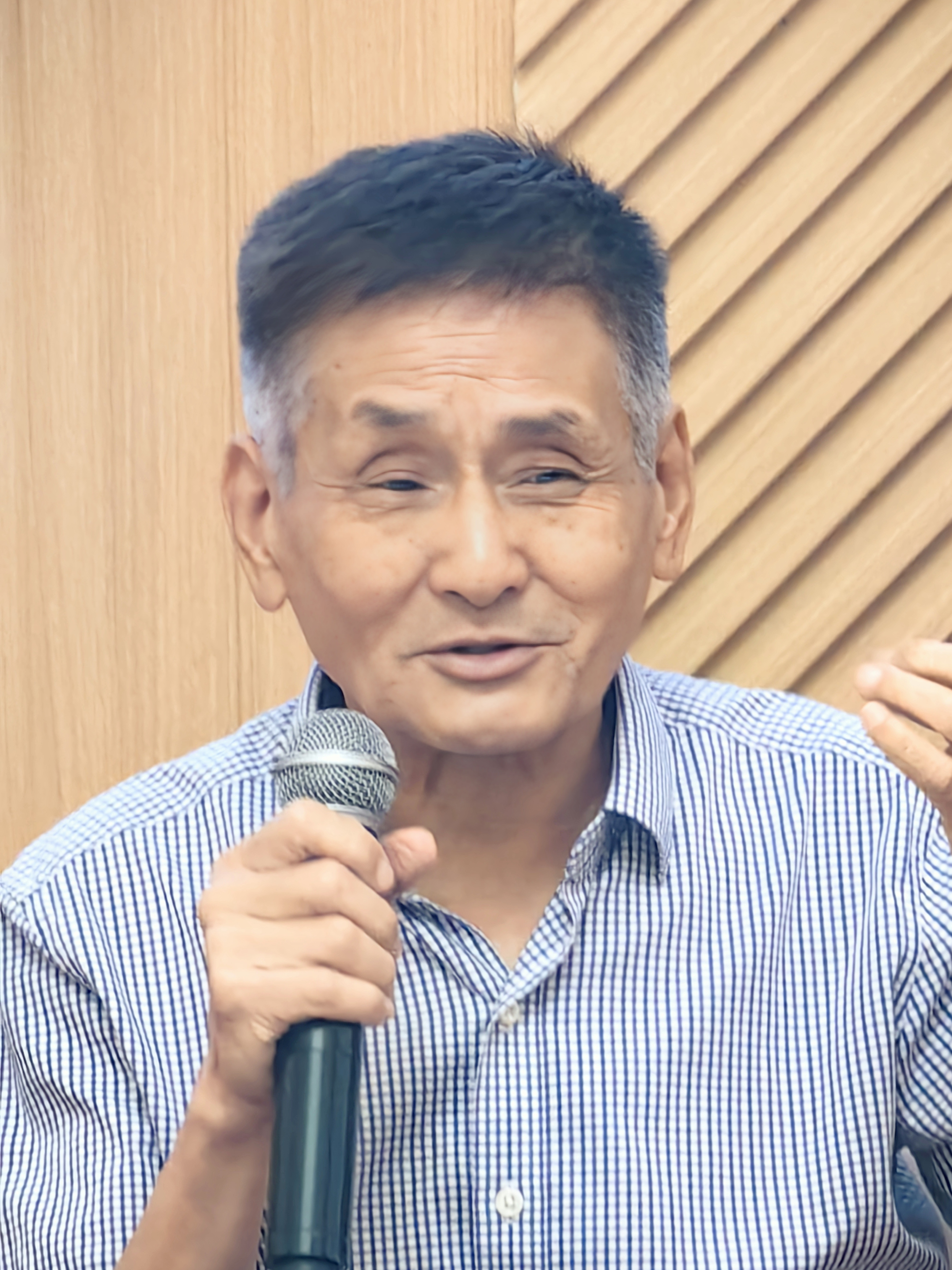
- Ye Xin in August 2025
- Born: Ye Chengxi (叶承熹); October 16, 1949 (age 76); Shanghai, China
- Education: high school
- Occupations: Novelist, screenwriter
- Spouse: Wang Shujun (王淑君)
- Children: Ye Tian (叶田)
- Writing career
- Language: written Chinese
- Period: 1974–present
- Notable work: Educated Youth (1992)

Ye Xin
- Traditional Chinese: 葉辛
- Simplified Chinese: 叶辛
Transcriptions
Standard Mandarin
- Hanyu Pinyin: Yè Xīn

Ye Xin (born Ye Chengxi on 16 October 1949) is a Chinese writer who has written profusely about "sent-down youths" (also known as "educated youths"), drawing from his own experience. A Shanghai native, Ye Xin "volunteered" to receive his "rustication" in remote Guizhou in 1969, where he spent 2 decades of his life. He has written over 20 novels, but is best known for writing the teleplay of mega-hit series Sinful Debt (1995), based on his 1992 novel Educated Youth.

Ye has been vice-chairman of China Writers Association since 1997, and president of Shanghai University College of Liberal Arts from 1997 to 2014.

== Life ==
Ye Chengxi was born in Shanghai. Since his parents owned land before the Chinese Communist Revolution, the family was classified a member of the "Five Black Categories" and raided during the Cultural Revolution. Ye graduated from high school in 1966, and was "sent down" to work in Chongming Island (a rural island under the jurisdiction of Shanghai) in 1968 as part of the Down to the Countryside Movement. A year later, Ye and his younger sister arrived in Xiuwen County, Guizhou (2000 km away from Shanghai), where he noticed "life was worse than [he] imagined."

Ye had been writing since elementary school, but in middle school he was once scolded by a teacher who happened upon his private diary and discovered "seeds of bourgeois thought". Free from such fear in the backwoods of Guizhou, Ye resumed his writing. He had to write in bed since there was no table, and rely on the paper his former classmate mailed him from Shanghai as it was otherwise also unavailable. In 1970, he joined hundreds of thousands of people to build the Hunan–Guizhou Railway, spending 2 years of "really tough" work on the railroad, often working without enough to eat. Thereafter he returned to his previous village and began teaching in an elementary school. His new position allowed for ample time to write.

Some of Ye's stories on "sent-down youths" were sent to a Shanghai publisher during this time. Editors there liked his writing, but wanted him to revise his stories to feature "class conflict" and incorporate the prevailing political movements such as "Criticize Lin, Criticize Confucius" or "Counterattack the Right-Deviationist Reversal-of-Verdicts Trend". Ye quite resented the idea, but reluctantly revised his works to get published. He also wrote children's stories to "avoid writing about class struggle". After the end of the Cultural Revolution in 1976 and the relaxation of the political atmosphere, Ye began to write about the hardships and sufferings endured by "sent-down youths", his "real emotions and thinking". In 1980 he went to Beijing to attend a workshop held at the Lu Xun Literary Institute. Subsequently he became chief editor of a Guizhou-based literary magazine until he returned to Shanghai in 1990.

== Filmography (as screenwriter) ==
- 1978: Huowa (火娃), a film based on his 1977 novel High Sierra in Miaoling (高高的苗岭). Ye Xin co-wrote the screenplay with director Xie Fei.
- 1982: The Ages of Idling Away (蹉跎岁月), a TV series based on his 1980 novel of the same name.
- 1995: Sinful Debt, a TV series based on his 1992 novel Educated Youth.
- 2010: Sinful Debt 2, a TV series based on his 2008 sequel novel, which actually continues the story of the TV series rather than the novel. Ye Xin co-wrote the screenplay with Zhang Wei and his son Ye Tian.

== Works available in English translations ==
Year	Chinese title	Translated English title	Translator
1992	孽债	Educated Youth	Jing Han
2003	玉蛙	A Pair of Jade Frogs	Yawtsong Lee
