= Lan Tianye =

Chinese actor and painter (1927–2022)

- 蓝天野
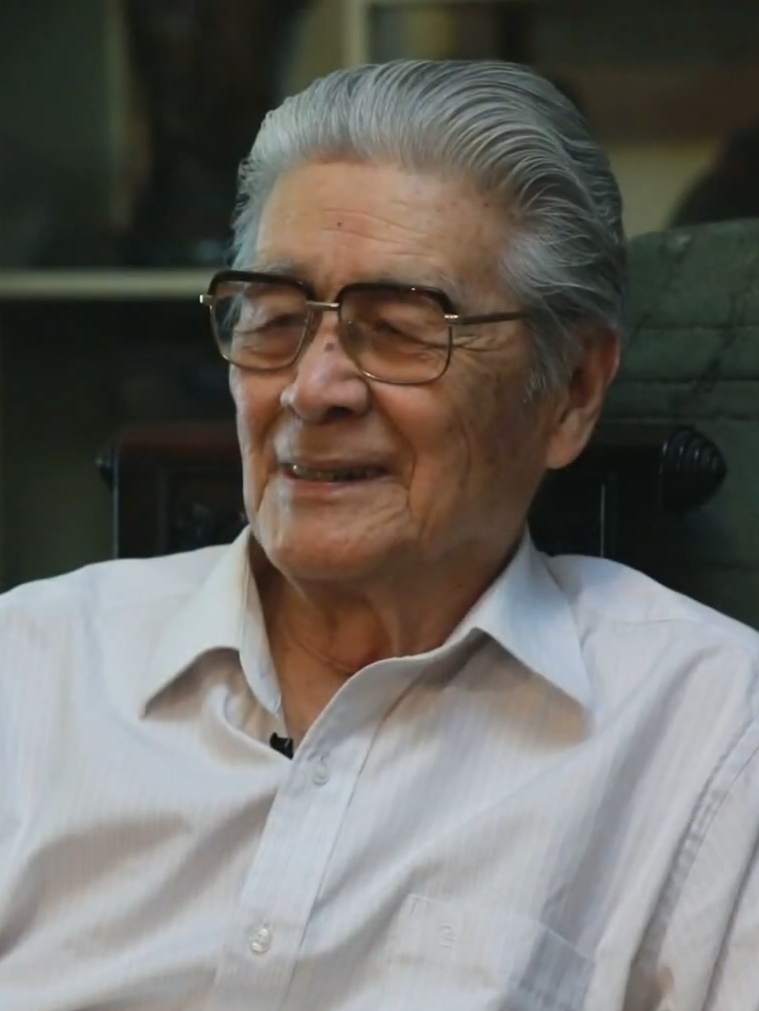
- Lan in 2019
- Born: Wang Runsen (王润森); Wang Huang (王皇); 3 May 1927; Raoyang County, Zhili (now Hebei), China
- Died: 8 June 2022 (aged 95); Beijing, China
- Education: National Beiping Art School
- Occupations: Actor, painter
- Years active: 1984–2004
- Notable work: The Investiture of the Gods
- Political party: Chinese Communist Party
- Movement: Cultural Revolution
- Spouse: Di Xin (m. 1954; died 2018)
- Awards: 13th China Drama Festival - Lifetime Achievement Award; 2013; July 1 Medal; 2021

Chinese name
- Traditional Chinese: 藍天野
- Simplified Chinese: 蓝天野
Transcriptions
Standard Mandarin
- Hanyu Pinyin: Lán Tiānyě

Wang Runsen
- Traditional Chinese: 王潤森
- Simplified Chinese: 王润森
Transcriptions
Standard Mandarin
- Hanyu Pinyin: Wáng Rùnsēn

Wang Huang
- Chinese: 王皇
Transcriptions
Standard Mandarin
- Hanyu Pinyin: Wáng Huáng

Lan Tianye (Chinese: 蓝天野; 3 May 1927 – 8 June 2022) was a Chinese actor and painter. Lan was noted for his roles as Jiang Ziya in the television series The Investiture of the Gods.

== Life ==
=== Early life ===
Lan was born Wang Runsen (Chinese: 王润森) in Raoyang County, Hebei (then Zhili) on 3 May 1927.

=== Acting career ===
Wang became a drama actor in 1944. Wang graduated from National Beiping Art School (国立北平艺术专科学校). He joined the Chinese Communist Party (CCP) on 23 September 1945. In 1948, during the Chinese Civil War, Wang relocated to CCP-controlled areas, and changed his name to Lan Tianye.

Lan entered the Beijing People's Art Theatre in 1952.

In 1962, Lan learned Chinese painting from Li Kuchan and Xu Linlu.

During the Cultural Revolution, Lan paused acting.

Lan made his TV series debut in The Last Emperor (1983), playing Zaifeng, Prince Chun, alongside Chen Daoming and Zhu Lin.

Lan first rose to prominence in 1990 for playing Jiang Ziya in the epic fantasy television series The Investiture of the Gods, adapted from Xu Zhonglin's classical novel of the same title. The series reached number one in the ratings when it aired in China.

In August 1996, Lan held a personal exhibition in Fukuoka, Japan.

In 2003, at the age of 76, Lan had a supporting role in The Proof Of Memories, a historical television series starring Yihong Duan, Bae Soo-bin and Li Guangjie.

On 9 November 2013, Lan won the Lifetime Achievement Award at the 13th China Drama Festival.

=== Death ===
On 8 June 2022, Lan died from pancreatic cancer in Beijing, at the age of 95.

== Personal life ==
In 1954 Lan married Di Xin (Chinese: 狄辛; 1927 – 17 November 2018), who was a dramatic actress.

== Filmography ==
=== Film ===
Year	English title	Chinese title	Role	Notes
	Tea House	茶馆	Qin Zhongyi	
	Cai Wenji	蔡文姬	Dong Si	
	Wang Zhaojun	王昭君	Hu Hanye	
	Beijing People	北京人	Zeng Wenqing	
1994		寡妇十日谈		
1996	Offspring of Concubine Yang	杨贵妃后传	Emperor Xuanzong of Tang	

=== Television ===
Year	English title	Chinese title	Role	Notes
1984	The Last Emperor	末代皇帝	Zaifeng, Prince Chun	
1985	Plainclothes Police	便衣警察	Mengmeng's father	
1986		追捕贼王	Yan Yifu	
1990	The Investiture of the Gods	封神榜	Jiang Ziya	
1990	Hope	渴望	Wang Zitao	
1992	Chinese Businessman	中国商人	guest	
1993		武夷仙凡界	Wuyijun	
1996	Family Affection	亲情	guest	
1997	A Revelation of Official Circles	官场现形记	Hua Zhongtang	
2000		月落长江	Xi Renfu	
2003	The Proof Of Memories	记忆的证明	Xiao Hansheng	

== Awards ==
- 13th China Drama Festival - Lifetime Achievement Award (2013)
- July 1 Medal (2021)
