= Huang Shuqin =

Chinese film director (1939–2022)

- 黄蜀芹
- Born: 9 September 1939; Shanghai, China
- Died: 21 April 2022 (aged 82); Shanghai, China
- Occupation: Director
- Spouse: Zheng Changfu
- Children: Zheng Dasheng 郑大圣
- Parents: Huang Zuolin; Jin Yunzhi
- Relatives: Huang Zuoshen (uncle)

Chinese name
- Traditional Chinese: 黃蜀芹
- Simplified Chinese: 黄蜀芹
Transcriptions
Standard Mandarin
- Hanyu Pinyin: Huáng Shǔqín

Huang Shuqin (9 September 1939 – 21 April 2022) was a Chinese film director known for her film Woman, Demon, Human (1987). Widely considered the first feminist Chinese film by critics and scholars, Woman, Demon, Human garnered universal critical acclaim, as well as a nomination for Best Director and a win for Best Writing at the 8th Golden Rooster Awards. Although her film career did not take off until she was well into her forties, she was regarded as one of China's most talented female directors, with a career spanning nearly three decades.

Huang was also known for the popular television series Fortress Besieged (1990) and Sinful Debt (1995) and she received awards and nominations in both television and film mediums.

== Early life and education ==
Huang Shuqin was born 9 September 1939 in Shanghai to film director Huang Zuolin, a well-known playwright who had studied in England during the 1920s, and Jin Yunzhi. Walking in her father's footsteps, Huang aspired to become a film director. She enrolled in China's only film school at the time, the Beijing Film Academy, to study directing, graduating in 1964. Assigned to work for Shanghai Film Studio as a script supervisor, her career was interrupted when the Cultural Revolution took hold of China. This prevented many films from being made, and left the Huang family in difficult financial circumstances. In addition, Huang's mother died during this time. Huang later attended a May Seventh Cadre School, which acted as a labour camp, for five years; two of which were spent under "isolation and surveillance" in a small room without contact from anyone as punishment for her possible involvement in the May 16 Notification in 1966. Huang also joined the Rebel Faction during this time.

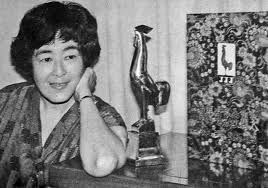
Huang Shuqin and her Golden Rooster award

== Career ==
After the end of the Cultural Revolution, she assisted director Xie Jin on the films The Cradle (1979) and The Legend of Tianyun Mountain (1980). Her debut film, Contemporary People (also translated as The Modern Generation) garnered widespread attention through its critical acclaim, which scholar Yingjin Zhang states grew as she directed more films, particularly Woman, Demon, Human.

Many of Huang's films explore the theme of gender and woman's consciousness. She has expressed the necessity to "insert herself" into her work, in order to give these films a personality, citing her gender as an important factor in her self-identity. Six of Huang's films are about women, each with a focus on the fundamental aspects of women's narratives and their relationship to mainstream ideology.

=== Forever Young (1983) ===
Forever Young is 1983 coming-of-age period film set during the initial rise of the Chinese Communist Party in the 1950s. The film tells three connected stories, one that explores social conflict between students in a girls middle school, another of a blossoming friendship between ill-fated Su Ning and the helpful Yang Qiangyun, and the third regarding the relationship between Catholic believer Hu Mali and members of the Communist Party. According to Xingyang Li, the film is meant to investigate the passion and nostalgia surrounding this time of political change, through the youthful and passionate lens of the young women growing up in this time period.

Zhang Xian's screenplay for the film, published in 1981, was initially met with criticism and therefore ignored by many Chinese directors at the time. Although tasked by the government to work on the film, Huang has stated that her involvement in the film was just as much a choice made by her as it was the government. Huang hoped to capture an authentic recreation of this time period, rather than one of celebration or rejection. As such, she states that any conclusion of what is right or wrong about this time period is meant to be decided by the audience, rather than the film itself.

Li has stated that Forever Young, and its exploration of women's consciousness in patriarchal society, is seen as a precursor to Huang's more explicitly feminist work later in her career, most notably her 1987 film Woman, Demon, Human.

=== Woman, Demon, Human (1987) ===
Woman, Demon, Human (Chinese: Ren - Gui - Qing; 《人·鬼·情》) is considered to be the first feminist film in China and is the first of Huang's films to garner international attention. The film tells the story of Qiu Yun, an opera actress who effectively plays male roles, particularly that of Zhong Kui, and her personal struggles over gender identity and conflict resolution within her family life. Scholars such as Shuqin Cui have written that the film portrays its protagonist, based on real-life actress Pei Yanling, as actively struggling with her simultaneous desire for and rejection of female identity.

Cui also felt that although the majority of Qiu Yun's relationships explored in the film are with male figures (her father, teacher, and husband), her difficult search for identity through these connections is informed most distinctly by her fragmented mother-daughter relationship established at the beginning of the film. She also states that this splintered relationship compels the protagonist to search for an alternative role in society outside the realm of traditionally maternal female identity and that Qiuyan's portrayal of male characters in Woman, Demon, Human is meant to dramatize this identity crisis initiated in her youth.

Prior to filming, Huang felt the need to personally visit Pei Yanling to study her life, even going so far as to follow her on tour with her travelling troupe to get a better idea of her day-to-day life. Huang did this before every film she made, believing it to be necessary to observe and understand life before filming. Despite its feminist reputation, Huang stated that she did not direct Woman, Demon, Human with the intention of making a feminist film.

Woman, Demon, Human was widely acclaimed by critics, receiving grand prizes at the Brasilia and Santa Barbara International Film Festivals, as well as a nomination for Best Directing and win for Best Writing (both for Huang) at the 8th Golden Rooster Awards.

=== A Soul Haunted by Painting (1994) ===
Huang began work on A Soul Haunted by Painting in the early 1990s, as China moved from a planned economy to a market economy. As the profit motive became the driving force behind film production in China, Huang pursued a more monetarily viable project compared to her previous work. On the subject of the film's box-office success, she stated: "When I was making [The Soul Haunted by Painting] I was going after box office success and I did my best to make it commercial."

The film tells the story of Pan Yuliang, a young woman employed as a prostitute, who eventually climbs her way into becoming a professor for a renowned Chinese institute of learning, and an accomplished artist. A Soul Haunted by Painting was initially banned by the Chinese government due to a nude scene, sparking public debate and furthering publicity for the film. Despite the more commercial elements of this project, Huang described The Soul Haunted by Painting as an "examination of the despicable national mindset that refuses to recognize the full personhood of women."

== Filmography ==
=== Films ===
Year	English title	Chinese title	Role
1977	Lianxi Dam		Co-Director
1979	The Cradle	啊，摇篮 A, yaolan	Assistant
1980	The Legend of Tianyun Mountain	天云山传奇 Tianyunshan chuanqi	Assistant
1981	Contemporary People	现代人 Xiandai ren	Director
1983	Forever Young	青春万岁 Qingchun wansui	Director
1984	Childhood Friends	童年的朋友 Tongnian de pengyou	Director
1986	A Border-Crossing Operation	超国界行动 Chao guojie xingdong	Director
1987	Woman, Demon, Human	人鬼情 Ren gui qing	Director
1994	A Soul Haunted by Painting	画魂 Huahun	Director
1996	I Have My Daddy, Too	我也有爸爸 Wo ye you baba	Director
2000	The Village Whore	村妓 Cun ji	Director
2001	Hey, Frank	嗨，弗兰克 Hai, Fulanke	Director

=== Television shows ===
Year	English title	Chinese title	Role
1990	Fortress Besieged	围城 Weicheng	Director
1995	Sinful Debt	孽债 Nie zhai	Director

== Accolades ==
Year	Organization	Award	Work	Result
1984	International film festival in the Soviet Union	Honourable Mention	Forever Young	Won
1985	Huabiao Awards	Outstanding Film	Childhood Friends	Won
1988	5th Rio de Janeiro Film Festival	Best Film	Woman, Demon, Human	Nominated
1988	8th Golden Rooster Awards	Best Director	Woman, Demon, Human	Nominated
1988	8th Golden Rooster Awards	Best Writing	Woman, Demon, Human	Won
1989	Fifth Film and Video Festival	Top Prize	Woman, Demon, Human	Won
1991	11th Feitian Awards	Outstanding Television Series	Fortress Besieged	Won
1991	11th Feitian Awards	Outstanding Director	Fortress Besieged	Won
1991	9th Golden Eagle Awards	Best Television Series	Fortress Besieged	Won
1992	7th Santa Barbara International Film Festival	Best Film	Woman, Demon, Human	Won
1995	15th Feitian Awards	Outstanding Television Series	Sinful Debt	Nominated
1997	17th Golden Rooster Awards	Best Children Film	I Have a Dad	Won
1997	17th Golden Rooster Awards	Best Director	I Have a Dad	Nominated
2016	7th China Film Directors Guild Awards	Outstanding Achievement Award		Won
Unknown	The First International TV Show Festival	Golden Bear	Fortress Besieged	Won
