= Sinful Debt 2 =

- a promotional image
- Also known as: Sinful Debt II
- Traditional Chinese: 孽債２
- Simplified Chinese: 孽债２
- Created by: Wang Tianyun; Zhao Baogang; Yin Xin
- Written by: Zhang Wei; Ye Xin; Ye Tian
- Directed by: Liang Shan; Shen Xinghao
- Starring: Zhai Tianlin; Yao Di; Zhang Mo; Zhao Youliang; Allen Ting; Ji Ning; Du Jiang; Luo Wei; Yan Xiaopin; Wang Huaying; Wu Mian; Wu Jing
- Opening theme: Songs from Sinful Debt: 1. "Shei Neng Gaosu Wo"; 2. "Nali You Wo De Jia"
- Ending theme: "Zai Xiangjian" (再相见) performed by Tan Jing
- Composer: Hao Weiya
- Country of origin: China
- Original languages: Mandarin; Shanghainese; Burmese
- No. of episodes: 30

Production
- Executive producers: Luo Gang; Peng Xiaolin
- Producer: Lu Chao
- Cinematography: Adil Jan; Guo Lei
- Running time: 45 minutes
- Production company: S.F.G. Emperor Culture Development Ltd.

Related
- Sinful Debt (1995)

Sinful Debt 2 is a 2010 Chinese television drama and the sequel of the 1995 hit series Sinful Debt. Again created by novelist Ye Xin, the story follows the same 5 children of sent-down youths—no longer teens but young adults nearing 30, as they establish careers and relationships in a post-modern world. Close to a dozen veteran actors repeated their memorable roles, but the 5 main characters were all portrayed by new actors.

Filming began in March 2009 in Shanghai. Part of the story is set in Myanmar close to the China–Myanmar border, and scenes were filmed on the border in both Tengchong and Ruili.

The series was first broadcast locally on Shanghai's East Movie Channel on 10 January 2010, exactly 1 day after the 15th anniversary of the original series. It was broadcast nationally on Xinjiang Television in 2011. Inevitably compared to the successful original series, the sequel was overwhelmingly considered disappointing.

== Cast and characters ==
=== Returning characters ===
Italics denote actors reprising their roles from Sinful Debt

- Yao Di as Shen Meixia
- Zhao Youliang as Shen Ruochen
- Yan Xiaopin as Mei Yunqing
- Li Chenjie as Shen Yang (Yangyang)
- Shen Guangwei as Shen Guanchen
- Zhai Tianlin as Liang Sifan
- Wu Mian as Ling Shanshan
- Chen Xuming as Liang Mancheng
- Zhang Mo as Sheng Tianhua
- Tu Ruying as Yu Leyin
- Chi Huaqiong as Ma Yumin
- Cao Kunqi as Ma Chaojun
- Tan Zengwei as Tu Yingde
- Zhang Linxiong as Sheng Jiawei
- Ji Ning as Lu Xiaofeng
- Li Jiayao as Lu Pinsan
- Du Jiang as An Yonghui
- Wu Jing as Yang Shaoquan
- Wang Huaying as Wu Guanchao
- Zhang Xiaoming as Han Ping
- Song Ge as Ningning
- Xiao Shumin as An Wenjiang

=== New characters ===
- Allen Ting as Lin Miao
- Luo Wei as Shang Miya
- Wei Lai as Su Rourou
- Wan Yang as Song Biyu
- Wang Weiwei as Lu Xiaozhou
- Gu Yan as Shang Haili
- Zhu Manfang as Shang Haili's mother
- Shi Tianshuo as Cheng Shanshan
