= Li Wenhua (film director and politician) =

Chinese film director and cinematographer

Li Wenhua (1929 – 19 June 2012), originally named Li Wenxiu, courtesy name Zishan, was a male Chinese film director and cinematographer from Luanping, Hebei. He served as a representative in the 4th National People's Congress.
