= July 1 Medal =

Highest honorary medal of the Chinese Communist Party

July 1 Medal 七一勋章
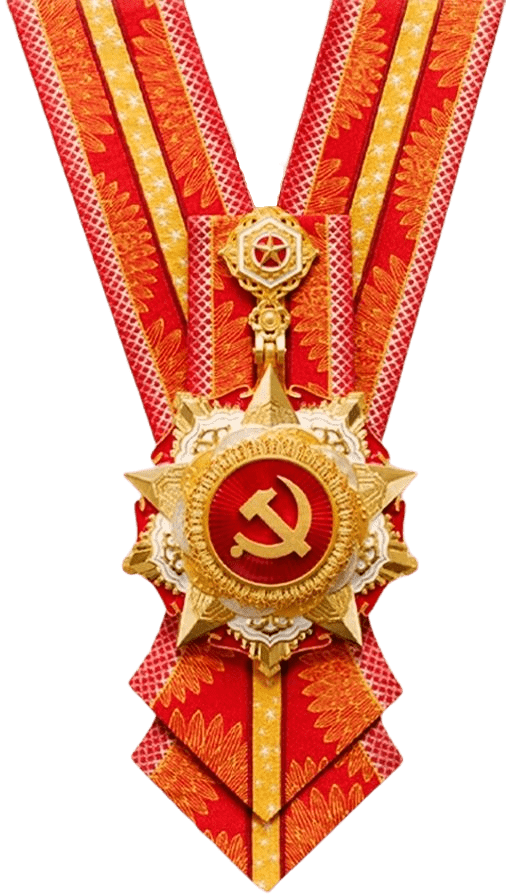

Awarded by the Chinese Communist Party
- Established: 22 July 2017
- Eligibility: Party members
- Awarded for: Awarded for significant contributions to Socialism with Chinese characteristics and the Chinese Communist Party.
- Status: Active
- Decided by: Central Committee
- Presented by: General Secretary of the Central Committee

Statistics
- First induction: 29 June 2021
- Last induction: 1 July 2026
- Total inductees: 37

Precedence
- Next (higher): Medal of the Republic; Friendship Medal
- Equivalent: August 1 Medal

The July 1 Medal is the highest honorary medal of the Chinese Communist Party (CCP). The bestowal is decided by the CCP Central Committee and presented by the CCP general secretary. It was established on 22 July 2017. According to the CCP's bylaws, the medal is bestowed on "party members who have made outstanding contributions and created valuable spiritual wealth in the great cause of socialism with Chinese characteristics and the new great project of party construction."

== History ==
On 27 February 2021, the General Office of the Central Committee of the Chinese Communist Party issued a notice "Notice on the nomination of the 'July 1st Medal' and the national 'Two Outstanding and One Advanced' recommendation work". This is the first time in the name of the Central Committee of the Chinese Communist Party on the 100th anniversary of the founding of the Chinese Communist Party.

The awarding of July 1 Medal is to commend national outstanding Communist Party members, national outstanding party workers and national advanced grassroots party organizations. On 31 May 2021, the Organization Department of the Central Committee of the Chinese Communist Party, CCP Central Committee Organization Department, the Office of the Party and the State Merit published a list to nominate candidates for the award.

On 29 June 2021, the award ceremony was held at 10:29 AM in the Great Hall of the People in Beijing. At the ceremony, Wang Huning, the First Secretary of the Secretariat of the Central Committee of the Chinese Communist Party, read the "Decision of the Central Committee of the Communist Party of China on Awarding the July 1 Medal". General Secretary Xi Jinping awarded 29 individuals the July 1 Medal at the ceremony.

== Eligibility ==
In July 2017, the "Regulations on the Inner-Party Meritorious Recognition of the Communist Party of China" and "Measures for the Award of the July 1 Medal" were formulated by the Working Committee on Party and State Merit and Honor Commendation. It was approved and implemented by the CCP Central Committee. In accordance with it, the July 1 Medal is awarded to party members who have made outstanding contributions to the great cause of Socialism with Chinese characteristics and the great new project of party building.

== Recipients ==
This with the * indicates that the July 1 Medal was awarded posthumously

S.No	Recipient name	Date of birth	Job title(s)	Contribution	Award grant date	Reference
1	Ma Maojie (马毛姐)	September 1935	Former deputy manager of Hefei Garment and Footwear Industry Company in Anhui Province	For heroism during the Yangtze River Crossing campaign in the Chinese Civil War. Post war, engaged in revolutionary tradition education.	29 June 2021	
2	Wang Shumao (王书茂)	December 1956	Secretary of the Party Branch of Tanmen village in Qionghai, Hainan Province. Director of the Village Committee, Deputy Company Commander of Tanmen Maritime Militia Company and Representative of the 13th National People's Congress.	For participation in a number of major national sea-related work, construction of Nansha Islands and reefs, and for defending Chinese sovereignty in the South China Sea.	29 June 2021	
3	Wang Zhanshan (王占山)	December 1929	Former deputy divisional consultant of Anyang Military Sub-district in Henan Province. Representative of the 4th and 5th National People's Congresses.	For participation in the Chinese Civil War, Korean War and Sino-Vietnamese War.	29 June 2021	
4	Wang Lanhua (王兰花)	June 1950	Secretary of the party branch and chairman of a charity organisation in Jinxing town at Wuzhong, Ningxia	For engagement in community service and starting a charity organisation to tackle problems of residents, to mediate civil disputes and to carry out public welfare activities.	29 June 2021	
5	Ai Aiguo (艾爱国)	March 1950	Welding consultant of Hunan Valin Xiangtan Iron and Steel Co., Ltd and chairman of the Supervisory Committee of Hunan Welding Association. Representative of the 7th National People's Congress and 15th National Congress of the Chinese Communist Party.	For helping to develop theoretical and operational skills for welding technology.	29 June 2021	
6	Shi Guangyin (石光银)	February 1952	Former Secretary of the party branch of Shilisha village in Dingbian County, Shaanxi Province and chairman of the Shaanxi Shiguangyin Sand Control Group Co., Ltd. Representative of the 13th National People's Congress and 18th National Congress of the Chinese Communist Party.	For helping to develop sand control and afforestation techniques for environmental protection.	29 June 2021	
7	Lü Qiming (吕其明)	May 1930	Former deputy director of Shanghai Film Studio art committee	For helping to cultivate the first batch of symphony composers and for achievements in film music composing.	29 June 2021	
8	Ting Bater (廷·巴特尔)	June 1950	Former secretary of party branch at Hongge'ergaole town in Abag Banner, Inner Mongolia Autonomous Region. Representative at the 17th and 18th National Congresses of the Chinese Communist Party. Representative at the 10th National People's Congress and the 13th National Committee of the Chinese People's Political Consultative Conference.	For helping to develop pastoral areas, exploring new ways to protect the ecology, develop the economy, promote income growth, production and life of the local herdsmen.	29 June 2021	
9	Liu Guijin (刘贵今)	August 1945	Former director-general of the Ministry of Foreign Affairs	For outstanding contributions to the development of China-Africa relations.	29 June 2021	
10	Sun Jingkun (孙景坤)	October 1924	Former captain of the First Production Team in Shancheng village at Yuanbao District, Liaoning Province	For participation in the Chinese Civil War and Korean War, and for participation in the development of his hometown.	29 June 2021	
11	Memetjan Wumer (买买提江·吾买尔)	December 1952	Former secretary of the party branch of Bulikai village in Yining County, Xinjiang Uyghur Autonomous Region and former director of the village committee. Representative of the 18th National Congress of the Chinese Communist Party.	For work against religious extremism, promotion of Mandarin language and party consolidation in Xinjiang.	29 June 2021	
12	Li Hongta (李宏塔)	May 1949	Former member and vice chairman of the Anhui Provincial CPPCC Committee. Member of the 11th and 12th CPPCC National Committees.	For work in the civil affair system for 18 years and for assistance provided to widowed elderly, special needs children and orphans.	29 June 2021	
13	Wu Tianyi (吴天一)	November 1934	Former researcher of cardiovascular and cerebrovascular disease in Qinghai Province and hospital academician in the Chinese Academy of Engineering.	For research in combatting against high altitude sickness, and for medical research in the Tibet Autonomous Region.	29 June 2021	
14	Xin Yuling (辛育龄)	February 1921	Former dean of China-Japan Friendship Hospital and director of thoracic surgery. Representative of the 5th National People's Congress.	For breakthroughs in various aspects of thoracic surgery and for outstanding contributions to the innovation and development of Chinese health industry. Also for being the first person in China to perform a lung transplantation.	29 June 2021	
15	Zhang Guimei (张桂梅)	15 June 1957	Founder and principal of Huaping High School for Girls, China's first and only free public high school for girls in Yunnan Province. Party branch secretary and representative of the 17th National Congress of the Chinese Communist Party.	For helping to improve female education in China and in developing a characteristic teaching model.	29 June 2021	
16	Lu Yuanjiu (陆元九)	9 January 1920	Member of the Chinese Academy of Sciences and Chinese Academy of Engineering. Advisor to the science and technology committee of China Aerospace Science and Technology Corporation. Representative of the 3rd National People's Congress, an of the 5th, 6th and 7th National Committee of the Chinese People's Political Consultative Conference.	For pioneering automation science and technology in China. And also for outstanding contributions to the Two Bombs, One Satellite project and development of major aerospace projects.	29 June 2021	
17	Chen Hongjun* (陈红军)*	March 1987	Battalion commander in the People's Liberation Army	For holding of the post in the border defense within the Southern Xinjiang Military Region, and died while defending China's territorial integrity during the 2020–2021 China–India skirmishes.	29 June 2021	
18	Lin Dan (林丹)	December 1948	Secretary of the Party Committee of Junmen community in Gulou District, Fuzhou, Fujian. Representative of the 17th and 18th National Congresses of the Chinese Communist Party.	For being outstanding representative of community workers, and for being rooted in the community for more than 40 years.	29 June 2021	
19	Zhoigar (卓嘎)	September 1961	Farmer at Yümai in Lhünzê County, Tibet Autonomous Region, and vice-president of Tibet Autonomous Region Women's Federation.	For helping to guard thousands of square kilometers of land by means of grazing and patrolling, and actively guiding the masses to listen to the party.	29 June 2021	
20	Zhou Yongkai (周永开)	March 1928	Former deputy secretary of Daxian Prefectural Party Committee in Sichuan	For dedication to benefiting the people in promoting local development, alleviating poverty, improving people's livelihood and ecological construction. Also for involvement in party's underground work in northern Sichuan during the Chinese Communist Revolution.	29 June 2021	
21	Chai Yunzhen* (柴云振)*	November 1926	Former deputy county-level cadre of the finance bureau in Yuechi County, Sichuan	For participation in Chinese Communist Revolution and Korean War, and later returned to village to work in farming.	29 June 2021	
22	Guo Ruixiang (郭瑞祥)	December 1920	Former deputy political commissar of Duyun Army Sub-district in Guizhou Province	For participation as soldier in the Chinese Red Army, during the Second Sino-Japanese War and Chinese Communist Revolution. Also for later maintaining the political qualities of the Red Army.	29 June 2021	
23	Huang Dafa (黄大发)	November 1959	Secretary of the party branch of Caowangba village in Bozhou District, Zunyi, Guizhou	Leading the villagers to excavate a canal with a main canal length of 7,200 meters and a branch canal length of 2,200 meters on the cliffs for 36 years. Also for making great contributions to the realization of poverty alleviation.	29 June 2021	
24	Huang Wenxiu* (黄文秀)*	18 April 1989	Member of the theoretical division in the municipal publicity department of Baise City, Guangxi, former deputy chief of Naman town in Guangxi and former first secretary of the village party branch in Leye County, Guangxi.	For engaging as secretary of a poor village, and dedicating her life to the cause of poverty alleviation. She died on June 17, 2019, when the car she was driving in heavy rain in Guangxi, was washed away by flash floods.	29 June 2021	
25	Huang Baomei (黄宝妹)	November 1959	Former deputy chairman of the Shanghai Seventeenth Cotton Textile Mills Trade Union and the eighth representative of the party.	For participating in the construction of many cotton spinning mills in many places, and member of the representatives of the textile workers in China.	29 June 2021	
26	Cui Daozhi (崔道植)	June 1934	Former divisional investigator of the Criminal Technology Division in Heilongjiang Provincial Public Security Department	For being China's chief gunshot trace identification expert, and participating research and development of on-site trace material evidence image processing and automatic identification of bullet traces, filling in many domestic technical gaps. Participated in solving a series of unsolved cases.	29 June 2021	
27	Lan Tianye (蓝天野)	3 May 1927	Former actor and director of Beijing People's Art Theatre	For his dedication in life to the people's literary and artistic cause. Participated in the revolution in youth and engaged in progressive literary and artistic activities.	29 June 2021	
28	Wei Deyou (魏德友)	November 1940	Retired employee of 1st Company, 161st Regiment, Ninth Division of the Xinjiang Production and Construction Corps	For engaging in border patrol for 50 years, covering over 200,000 kilometers.	29 June 2021	
29	Qu Duyi (瞿独伊)	5 November 1921	Former cadre of the International News Editorial Department of Xinhua News Agency	For being the first group of Chinese journalists stationed abroad, who went to Moscow to establish a Xinhua News Agency bureau. During this period, she served as the translator for Premier of China Zhou Enlai and the Chinese delegation to the Soviet Union.	29 June 2021	
30	Ma Shanxiang (马善祥)	1956	Retired community worker and mediator, Chongqing	Grassroots mediation and community governance; resolved more than 2,500 disputes over three decades.	1 July 2026	
31	Wang Yuchang (王玉昌)	1935/1936	PLA veteran	Major contributions to China's missile forces, including shooting down two U-2 reconnaissance aircraft and advancing missile operations.	1 July 2026	
32	Li Liancheng (李连成)	1952	Party secretary and director of Xixinzhuang Village Committee, Henan	Rural revitalization, poverty alleviation, and development of the collective village economy.	1 July 2026	
33	Uhas Sulayman (吾哈斯·苏里坦)	1955/1956	Former deputy chief physician, Yumin County, Xinjiang	Decades of medical service in remote pastoral areas, improving healthcare and ethnic unity.	1 July 2026	
34	Wu Yaqin (吴亚琴)	1960/1961	First Party secretary, Changchun community, Jilin	Grassroots community governance, dispute mediation, and training of community workers.	1 July 2026	
35	Zhao Yafu (赵亚夫)	1940/1941	Agricultural researcher	Promotion of modern agriculture and rural revitalization over six decades, introducing improved crop varieties and farming techniques.	1 July 2026	
36	Zhong Jue (钟掘)	1936/1937	Professor, Central South University; academician of the Chinese Academy of Engineering	Advances in aluminium processing technology and major national engineering projects.	1 July 2026	
37	Chen Junwu* (陈俊武)*	17 March 1927	Chemical engineer; academician of the Chinese Academy of Sciences	Pioneer of China's petroleum refining and petrochemical industry.	1 July 2026	
