= Sinful Debt =

- A screenshot from ep. 1
- Also known as: Sinful Debts; The Wages of Sin
- Traditional Chinese: 孽債
- Simplified Chinese: 孽债
- Hanyu Pinyin: Niè Zhài
- Shanghainese Romanization: Nyih Tsa
- Created by: Huang Haiqin
- Based on: Educated Youth by Ye Xin
- Written by: Ye Xin
- Directed by: Huang Shuqin
- Starring: Zhao Youliang; Yan Xiaopin; Jin Xin; Wu Mian; Wu Jing; Wang Huaying; Tu Ruying; Li Jiayao; Li Ying; Dong Rongrong; Li Yanbo; Luo Zhenhua; Hai Jia; Yang Chengyun
- Narrated by: Liang Shan
- Opening theme: "Shei Neng Gaosu Wo" (谁能告诉我) by Li Chunbo
- Ending theme: "Nali You Wo De Jia" (哪里有我的家) performed by Xie Liangzi and Fire Bird
- Composer: Zou Huiming
- Country of origin: China
- Original languages: Shanghainese; Mandarin; some English, Japanese
- No. of episodes: 20

Production
- Executive producer: Qian Qingqing
- Producer: Cai Yongrui
- Cinematography: Liu Lihua; Xinghao
- Running time: 45 minutes

Original release
- Network: Shanghai Television
- Release: January 9, 1995

Related
- Sinful Debt 2 (2010)

Sinful Debt is a 1995 Chinese television drama directed by Huang Shuqin and produced by Shanghai Television. It was written by Ye Xin, based on his 1992 novel Educated Youth. The series follows five innocent-eyed teens (all portrayed by first-time actors) who travel more than 2000 km from remote Xishuangbanna Dai Autonomous Prefecture to Shanghai searching for their unacquainted parents — former sent-down youths who in order to return home (in the late 1970s or early 1980s) abandoned them in the countryside. They teens did not expect, however, that their unannounced arrivals would create myriads of economic and relational problems for their urban parents, many of whom already remarried with new families.

Sinful Debt hit home with a national audience, particularly those affected by the devastating Cultural Revolution (1966–76) and its Down to the Countryside Movement, registering a record-setting 42.62% audience share in Shanghai. According to reporter Yu Liangxin of the Shanghai Times, when more than 20 reporters sat together to watch the drama, most cried their eyes puffy. The dialogue is mostly in Shanghainese, and the TV series is generally considered a representative TV drama of Haipai culture.

The series was also shown in Vietnam in 1997 and became a hit as well. A sequel also written by Ye Xin, Sinful Debt 2, was first shown in 2010, returning many of the older actors from the original series.

== Cast and characters ==
- Dong Rongrong as Shen Meixia, 14. Her mother was Dai.
- Zhao Youliang as Shen Ruochen, Meixia's father.
- Yan Xiaopin as Mei Yunqing, Shen Ruochen's wife.
- Shen Guangwei as Shen Guanchen, Shen Ruochen's brother.
- Gao Longshu as Yuefang, Shen Guanchen's wife.
- Shen Minhua as Shen Ruochen's mother.
- Li Ji as Shen Ruochen's father.
- Li Yanbo as Liang Sifan, 15. His mother is also Dai. Like many Dai boys, Sifan is a novice Buddhist monk.
- Jin Xin as Liang Mancheng, Sifan's father.
- Wu Mian as Ling Shanshan, Liang Mancheng's wife.
- Luo Zhenhua as An Yonghui, 15.
- Wu Jing as Yang Shaoquan, Yonghui's mother.
- Wang Huaying as Wu Guanchao, Yonghui's father.
- Zhang Xiaoming as Hanping, Wu Guanchao's wife.
- Yang Chengyun as Sheng Tianhua, 16.
- Tu Ruying as Yu Leyin, Tianhua's mother.
- Li Guoliang as Ma Chaojun, Yu Leyin's husband.
- Chi Huaqiong as Ma Yumin, Yu Leyin's stepdaughter.
- Liu Changwei as Yu Lesheng, Yu Leyin's brother.
- Wu Meimei as Yu Leyin's mother.
- Hai Jia as Lu Xiaofeng, 15.
- Hua Mingwei as Lu Zhengqi, Xiaofeng's father.
- Li Jiayao as Lu Pinshan, Lu Zhengqi's father.
- Li Ying as Lu Yuqi, Lu Zhengqi's sister.
- Shen Wei as Lu Jiaqi, Lu Zhengqi's brother.
