= Jianan Pass =

Mountain pass in Ladakh, India and Aksai Chin, China

- 加南达坂
- Location within Ladakh Location within Southern Xinjiang
- Elevation: 5,355 metres (17,569 ft)

Third Approach
- Location: Ladakh (India), Xinjiang (China)
- Range: Karakoram Range
- Coordinates: 34°32′33″N 78°38′04″E

Jianan Pass (Chinese: 加南达坂; pinyin: Jiā nán dá bǎn) is a mountain pass in the eastern Karakoram Range near the Chang Chenmo Valley. The Line of Actual Control (LAC) between India and China runs through the pass dividing the Indian-administered Ladakh and Chinese-administered Aksai Chin. The pass lies on the watershed between Kugrang and Galwan river basins. The Changlung river basin is also immediately to the east of the pass. While China uses the name "Jianan Daban" for the pass, India refers to it as Patrol Point 15 (PP-15) for border security purposes. The term "Hot Springs" has also been used by Indian media through misapplication of terminology. (Note: The area is commonly referred to in English language media as "Hot Springs" or "PP15 at Hot Springs". The actual Hot Springs (Kyam) are well to the southeast, in the Chang Chenmo Valley. The terminology is correct only to the extent that the entire Kugrang River Valley may be generically referred to as the "Hot Springs area".)

The region around the pass is part of the Sino-Indian border dispute. China advanced its border claims between 1956 and 1960, eventually claiming the Galwan river basin to the north of the pass, while India continued to claim the entire Aksai Chin plateau. India set up an advance post to the north of the Jianan Pass in 1962, near the Galwan Valley, which caused an "apogee of tension". During the 1962 war, China attacked the post and eliminated it, enforcing its territorial claims.

During the 2020–2022 skirmishes, the area around the pass was again a scene of contest. The standoff was finally resolved in September 2022, with a disengagement formula agreed.

== Geography ==
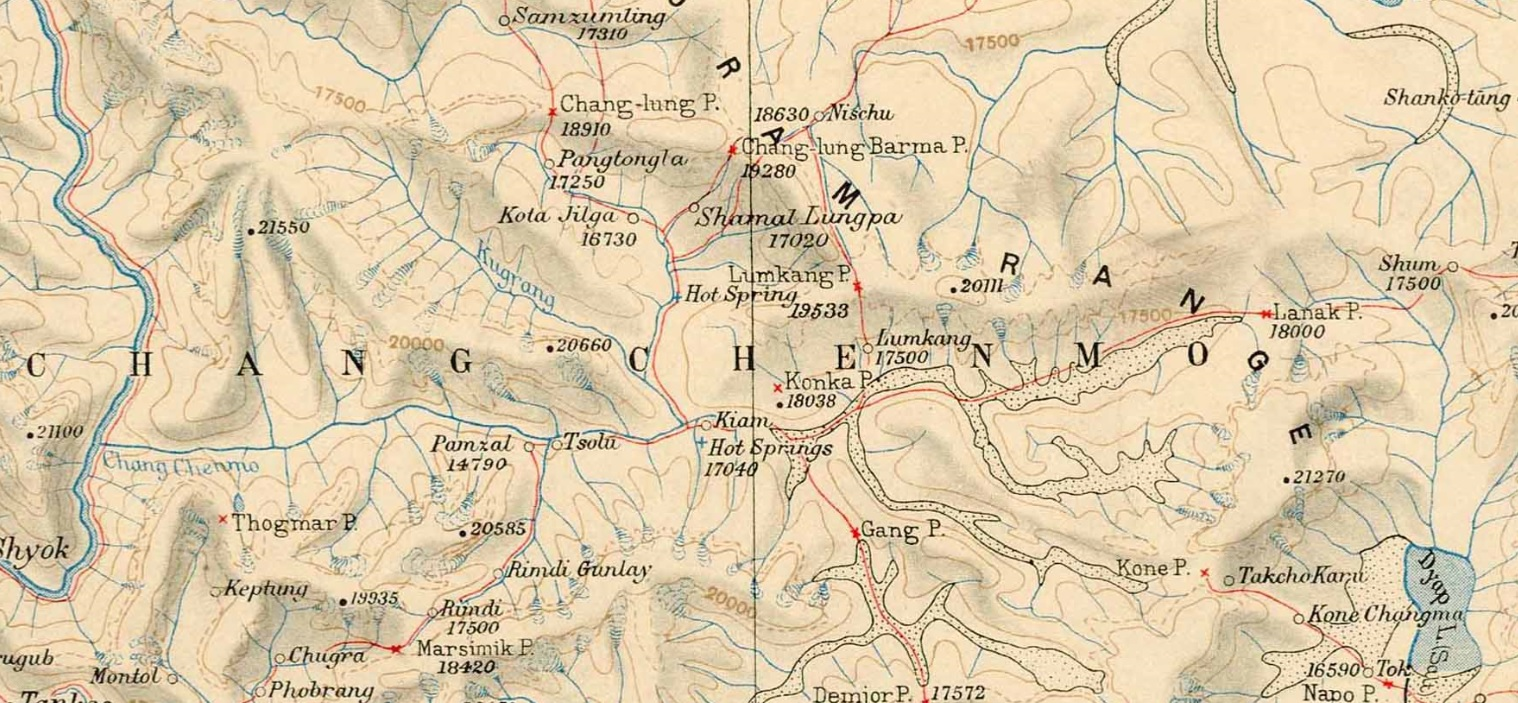
Map 1: Changchenmo Valley, with its branch valleys of Kugrang and Changlung. The Jianan Pass (unmarked) is to the west of the Changlung P[ass], and the source of the Changlung river. (Survey of India, 1916)

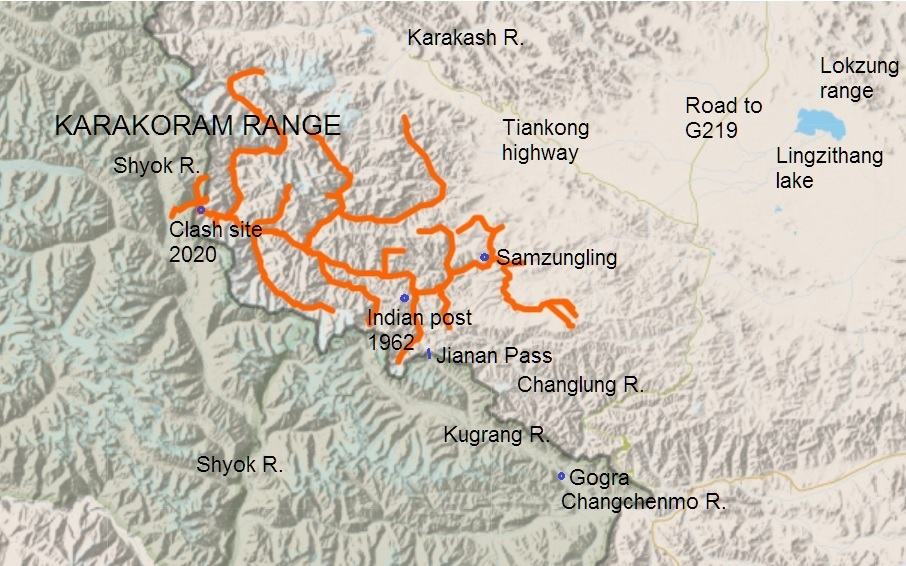
Map 2: Galwan river basin and the Jianan Pass to its south

South of Galwan Valley, the Karakoram range divides into multiple branches. The western branch lies between the Shyok River valley and the Kugrang valley, the middle branch between the Kugrang and Changlung valleys, and the eastern branch to the east of the Changlung valley. The Kugrang river flows southeast within the territory under present Indian control, joining the Chang Chenmo River near Hot Springs (also called Kyam or Kayam). The Changlung river flows in a parallel valley to the northeast in territory under present Chinese control, but eventually joins the Kugrang river near Gogra.

The Kugrang Valley extends further northwest than the Changlung Valley, interacting with the Galwan river basin to the north. The Jianan Pass lies on the watershed between Kugrang and Galwan basins. It is a relatively low pass, at an elevation of 5350 metres, and the ascent on both the sides is gradual. To the south of Jianan pass lies a 15 km-long tributary of the Kugrang River. To the north of the pass is a small stream, which joins a tributary of Galwan called Shimengou (Chinese: 石门沟; pinyin: Shímén gōu), flowing into the Galwan River 8 km downstream.

== History ==
The Kugrang Valley was little explored during the British Raj. Survey maps show survey stations having been established near the Chang Chenmo Valley. So the Kugrang Valley was only surveyed from a distance, with the results being quite approximate. The Kugrang valley did form a popular hunting area for British officers vacationing in Ladakh.

=== Sino-Indian border dispute ===
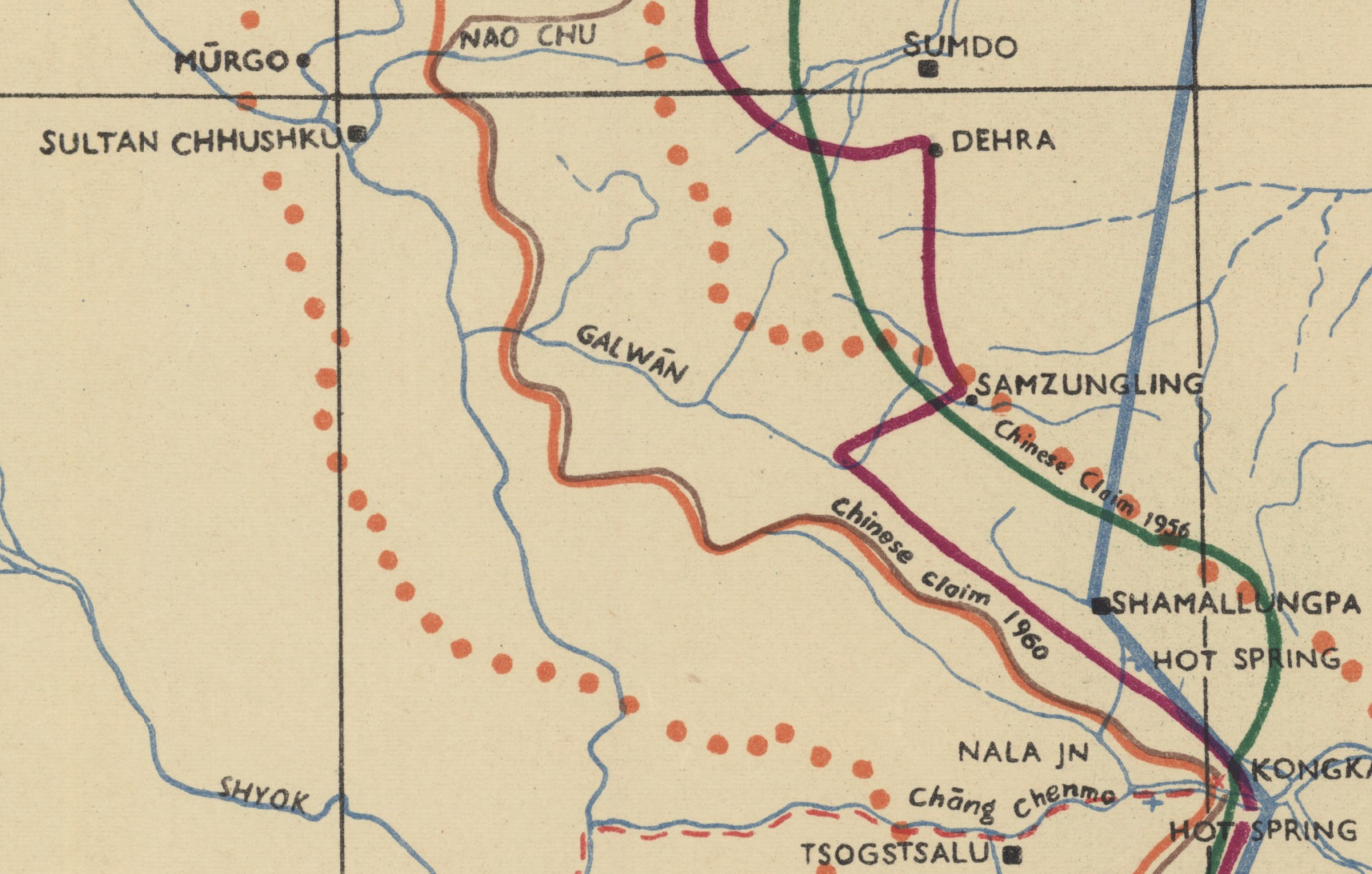
Map 3: Chinese claim lines near the Galwan and Kugrang basins: green line in 1956, dark brown/orange in 1960. The light blue line links the Chinese posts believed to have been set up in 1959; the purple line links the Chinese advances in 1960. (US Army HQ, 1962)

After India became independent in 1947 and China took control of Tibet in 1950, both the countries laid claim to the Aksai Chin plateau. In its 1956 border definition, China claimed Lingzithang Plains up to the campsite of Samzungling in the upper Galwan Valley. The majority of the eastern Karakoram range was left in India, including the Galwan Valley to the west of Samzungling and the entire Changlung valley. (Map 3)

Not recognising Chinese claims to Aksai Chin, India continued to send border patrols in "all directions". A common patrol route was along the Changlung Valley and Samzungling to the northern periphery of Aksai Chin. In 1959, a police party sent to set up police posts in these valleys was confronted by Chinese troops near Kongka La and a serious clash occurred, called the Kongka Pass incident.

After the incident, the two countries engaged in serious negotiations. A summit between the prime ministers Jawaharlal Nehru and Zhou Enlai was held in 1960, where Zhou is believed to have proposed an "east west swap" of disputed territories. India is believed to have rejected such a barter. Sector-by-sector border discussions were held later in 1960 between the officials of the two countries, where China enlarged its border claims. (See Map 3.) In the vicinity of the Kugrang valley, the Chinese officials declared:

From peak 6,598, [the traditional customary line] runs along the mountain ridge southwards until it crosses the Galwan River at approximately 78° 13' E, 34° 46' N. Thence it passes through peak 6,556 (approximately 78° 26' E, 34° 32' N), and runs along the watershed between the Kugrang Tsangpo River and its tributary the Changlung River to approximately 78° 53' E, 34° 22' N. where it crosses the Changlung River. It then follows the mountain ridge in a south-easterly direction up to Kongka Pass.

This new "1960 claim line" meant that China laid claim to the majority of the Galwan river basin and the entire Changlung river basin, turning the Jianan Pass into a border pass.

=== 1962 standoff ===
Map 4: 1962 Galwan standoff (Note: "G. P." is for Galwan Post, platoon-sized; coordinates given by China. "R. P." is for "Ration Party" post, also platoon-sized; coordinates given by India. "O. P." was an observation post, section-sized. China built up a battalion strength at Samzungling during the course of the standoff. It had motorable roads to Samzungling and Shamal Lungpa, whereas India was dependent on animal transport.)

In the summer of 1962, sensing that China was trying to advance to its 1960 claim line, India initiated what came to be called the "forward policy", setting up advance posts in the territory between the 1960 and 1956 claim lines. The 1/8 Gorkha Riles battalion was ordered to set up a post in the upper reaches of the Galwan River. (Note: According to the Henderson Brooks–Bhagat Report the Army Headquarters ordered a reconnaissance via Hot Springs in April 1962. After receiving the Western Command's input, it overruled their objections and ordered the setting up of the Galwan post on 28 May 1962. Two companies of 1/8 Gorkha Rifles were ear-marked for the Hot Springs sector, but only one (the 'A' company) was able to reach in time due to the paucity of animal transport.) Setting out from Phobrang, the 'A' Company of the battalion first established a base at Hot Springs. A platoon of the company then moved towards Galwan in July 1962, after setting up a post near Gogra (then called "nullah junction").

The route followed by the Gorkha platoon is not recorded in Indian military history, but it is known that there were only two routes available to them: through the Changlung Valley or via the Jianan Pass. Since Shamal Lungpa in the Changlung Valley was already occupied by the Chinese forces (Map 3), the Jianan route seems more likely. The post set up by them was in the Shimengou valley, north of the pass, close to the confluence of Shimengou with the Galwan River. China provided the coordinates of the post and described it as "six kilometres inside Chinese territory in the Galwan Valley area".

Despite a seriously threatening posture by the Chinese troops, the post held firm and remained intact until the beginning of the war in October 1962. It was supplied by air. Even though a supply route was available through the Jianan Pass, the Chinese forces surrounded the Gorkha post and did not allow supplies to pass through. In early October, the Gorkha Rifles were due for a turnover, and they were replaced by troops of 5 Jat, again by air. Indian sources claim that additional supporting posts were also set up by the Indian troops. (Map 4)

=== 1962 war ===
The Sino-Indian War began in the western sector on 19 October 1962. The Chinese attacked all Indian posts that were beyond their 1960 claim line. The Indian Galwan post was the first to be attacked, and eliminated by the evening of 20 October. The next day, the Chinese shelled the remaining posts. Since there was no tactical need for the supporting posts after the fall of the Galwan post, they were withdrawn to Gogra.

The Line of Actual Control (LAC) resulting from the war remained on the watershed of the Kugrang river.

=== 2010–2015 ===
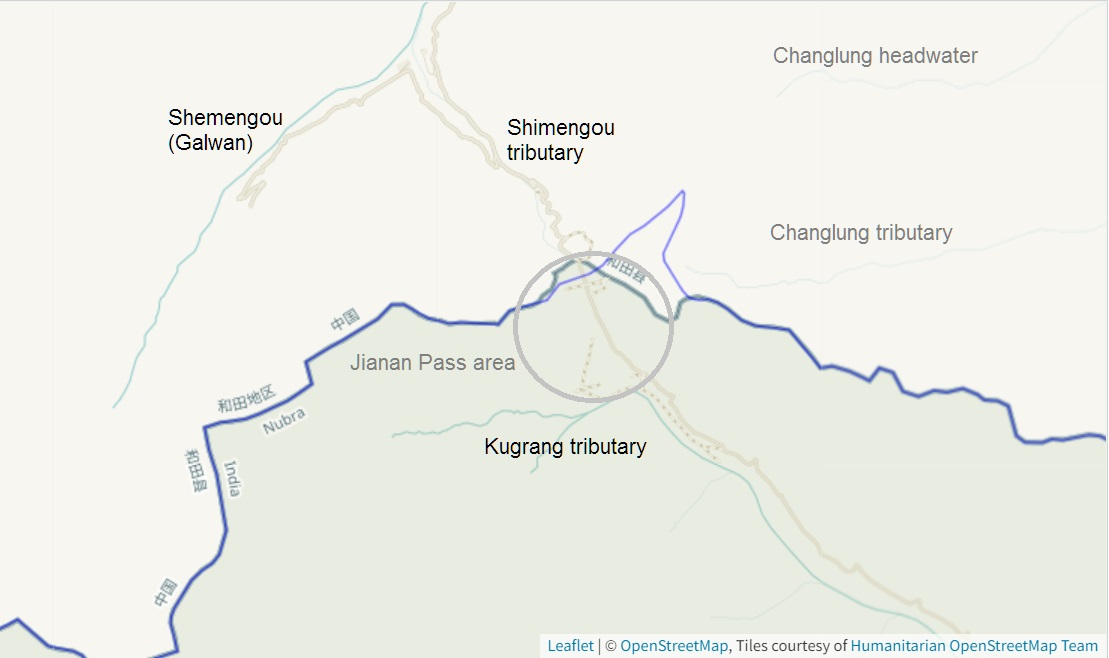
Map 5: LAC at the Jianan Pass: The line marked by the US Office of the Geographer in 2013 (in blue) and that marked by OpenStreetMap in 2022 (in green). The US line passes through the assumed location of the pass; the OpenStreetMap line passes through a trench that became visible in 2015 satellite imagery.

After the 1962 war, both India and China left the border alone for about two decades. In the 1980s, both resumed patrolling up to the prevailing border. At many locations along the LAC, there were overlapping claims, and protocols were eventually developed to avoid conflicts. However, at this pass, which China began to call "Jianan Pass" and India the "Patrol Point 15", there were no overlapping claims, but the occupation of the pass itself might have been contested.

Historical satellite imagery shows that, between 2010 and 2015, both the sides laid motorable roads to the pass. The 2015 image shows a continuous road extending towards both the sides of the pass and a trench dug across it a few metres to the north of the pass along with other smaller trenches in the pass area. (Map 5) This would imply that both sides denied road access to each other for the pass area.

=== 2020–2022 border standoff ===
During the wide-ranging China–India border standoff that began in 2020, the Jianan Pass area was again contested. Historical satellite imagery shows that the road in the pass area has been repaved over the earlier trenches. On 5 May 2020, news media reported that clusters of Chinese forces began appearing in the "Gogra–Hot Springs" area. It later became clear that the Jianan Pass was included in this description.

Over a thousand Chinese soldiers are reported to have crossed the LAC at Jianan Pass and India said to have carried out a "mirror deployment" of its own troops. On 6 June, it was reported that the commanders of the two sides agreed to a "disengagement" at Galwan, Gogra and Hot Springs, but this was not followed through. There was no pull-back from the Gogra–Hot Springs area, whereas, at Galwan, the Chinese soon reinstated their post. (Note: The standoff in the Galwan Valley was at its LAC, some 30–40 miles to the west of Samzungling. But the Chinese supply route to the LAC and major military installations were at the Samzungling area. The Jianan Pass was a "back door" to the area, which China would have needed to secure.) This led to a serious clash at Galwan, in which twenty Indian soldiers and at least four Chinese soldiers died.

According to later reports, the majority of the troops at the Jianan Pass were withdrawn by July 2020, but a "small detachment" of about 50 soldiers remained. Near Gogra, the Chinese forces came down 2–4 km from the Line of Actual Control, and set up posts close to Gogra itself, thereby "blockading" the Kugrang Valley and denying India access to the Jianan Pass. It took several months and 10 rounds of talks between the military commanders to agree on the first pull-back in February 2021, at the Pangong Lake. In the 12th round of talks in August 2021, the two sides agreed to disengage at Gogra.

Discussions for disengagement at the Jianan Pass continued. In April 2022, during the visit of Chinese foreign minister Wang Yi to New Delhi, a proposal was apparently made that the Indian troops should move back to the "Karam Singh Post", which is near the mouth of the Kugrang River, at over 30 km distance from the Jianan Pass. India rejected the proposal. Similar proposals are believed to have been made at the commander level talks during the 13–15th rounds, with similar results.

After the 16th round of talks in July 2022, optimistic reports appeared saying "forward movement likely". After a lull of two months, a surprise announcement was made by the Indian External Affairs Ministry in September that the disengagement process had already started on 8 September and would be complete by 12 September. It was stated the LAC in the area would be strictly observed by both the sides and that there would be no unilateral change in the status quo. NDTV published satellite imagery a few days later, confirming that the Chinese PLA had moved their post north of the pass to a location 3 km downstream along the Shimengou river. The LAHDC Councillor from Chushul, Konchok Stanzin, informed the media that the Indian post at the mouth of the Jianan Valley (referred to as "PP 16") was also moved. According to satellite imagery, it was moved two kilometres downstream along the Kugrang River.

While the External Affairs Ministry announcement only mentioned that the LAC would be strictly observed, most media commentators interpreted the withdrawals as creating a "buffer zone". (Note: In previous instances of disengagement along the LAC, the term "buffer zone" has been used to refer to areas where neither side would have posts and neither side would patrol. No suggestion of such a "buffer zone" at Jianan Pass has been made by either Indian or Chinese government.) Konchok Stanzin has claimed that the grazing grounds of Ladakhi nomads have now become a "buffer zone".

== See also ==
- Kongka Pass

== Bibliography ==
- Gazetteer of Kashmir and Ladak, Calcutta: Superintendent of Government Printing, 1890
- India. Ministry of External Affairs, ed. (1962), Notes, Memoranda and Letters Exchanged and Agreements Signed Between the Governments of India and China: July 1962 - October 1962, White Paper No. VII (PDF), Ministry of External Affairs
- India, Ministry of External Affairs, ed. (1962), Report of the Officials of the Governments of India and the People's Republic of China on the Boundary Question, Government of India Press
  - Palat, Madhavan K., ed. (2016) [1962], "Report of the Officials of the Governments of India and the People's Republic of China on the Boundary Question", Selected Works of Jawaharlal Nehru, Second Series, Volume 66, Jawaharlal Nehru Memorial Fund/Oxford University Press, ISBN 978-01-994670-1-3 – via archive.org
- Henderson-Brookes and Bhagat Report, Part 1 (PDF), Government of India (internal report, unpublished), 1963 – via indefencereview.com
- Johri, Sitaram (1969), Chinese Invasion of Ladakh, Himalaya Publications
- Joshi, Manoj (2021), Eastern Ladakh, the Longer Perspective, Observer Research Foundation
- Hoffmann, Steven A. (1990), India and the China Crisis, University of California Press, ISBN 978-0-520-06537-6
- Maxwell, Neville (1970), India's China War, Pantheon Books, ISBN 978-0-394-47051-1 – via archive.org
- Menon, Shivshankar (2016), Choices: Inside the Making of India's Foreign Policy, Brookings Institution Press, ISBN 978-0-8157-2911-2
- Mullik, B. N. (1971), My Years with Nehru: The Chinese Betrayal, Allied Publishers – via archive.org
- Sandhu, P. J. S.; Shankar, Vinay; Dwivedi, G. G. (2015), 1962: A View from the Other Side of the Hill, Vij Books India Pvt Ltd, ISBN 978-93-84464-37-0
- Sinha, P.B.; Athale, A.A. (1992), Prasad, S. N. (ed.), History of the Conflict with China, 1962 (PDF), History Division, Ministry of Defence, Government of India
