= Rasool Galwan =

Indian explorers

Ghulam Rasool Galwan
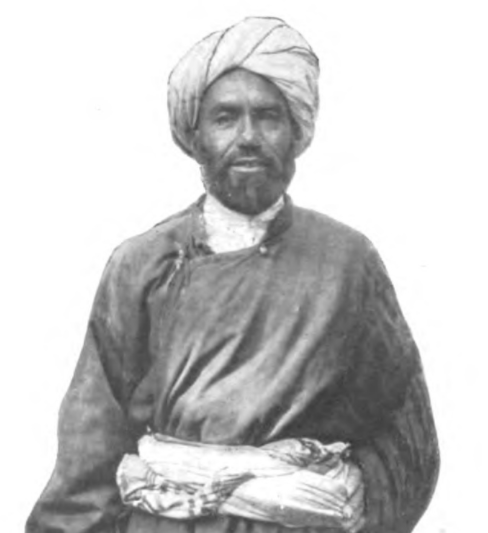
- Portrait of Ghulam Rasool Galwan
- Born: 1878; Leh, Ladakh (then British India)
- Died: 1925 (aged 46–47)
- Other names: Rasool Galwan, Ghulām Rassūl Galwan
- Occupations: Explorer, caravan bashi (caravan manager), guide
- Known for: Leading European expeditions in the Himalayas, namesake of the Galwan River and Valley
- Notable work: Servant of Sahibs (travel diary, published posthumously)

Ghulam Rasool Galwan (1878–1925), or Rasool Galwan, also spelled as Ghulām Rassūl Galwan, was a Ladakhi explorer of Kashmiri descent, after whom the Galwan River is named. He was an acclaimed guide and caravan bashi (caravan manager), who accompanied numerous expeditions of European explorers during the British Raj. Excerpts from his travel diary were published under the title Servant of Sahibs, edited by Katherine Barrett.

== Family ==
According to Walter Roper Lawrence, Galwans (or Galawans) were horse-keepers of the Kashmir region, who later developed into robbers.

Rasool Galwan states that his maternal grandfather, Mahmut Galwan, fled to Baltistan during the Dogra rule, married a Balti woman and later moved to Leh. His mother was born to them, but grew up with an uncle called Gafoor Galwan. Her first husband went to Yarkand for work and never returned. Afterwards, she married Ibrahim and had four children, including Rasool Galwan.

His mother lived by winnowing wheat for other farmers. She evidently had a lot of influence on him as a young boy and raised him with love and care. There is very little about his father in his autobiography.

== Early life ==
Galwan was born in 1878 to a Pathan family in Ladakh and got his early start in life by working chores for the kutedar who employed his mother. One day, Galwan volunteered for measuring wheat and surprised the kutedar with his ability.

== Works ==
Galwan is said to have kept a travel diary in which he regularly wrote down the details of all his travels. Teresa Littledale taught him English during a trip to Tibet. Later, Robert and Katherine Barrett, a wealthy couple from Chicago whom he accompanied during their Central Asian travels, encouraged him to write a book on his experiences. Edited by Katherine Barrett with some explanatory notes, the manuscript was eventually published by St. George Littledale in Cambridge. Francis Younghusband wrote an introduction to the book.

The book sold extremely well, and went into a second edition, surprising Littledale. He hadn't read the book initially but, after its success, he did, and commented that there was very little "lie matter" (Note: Galwan's pidgin English phrase for falsties.) concerning their trip (which indeed formed a substantial amount of the content in the book).

Younghusband wrote in the Introduction that Galwan was animated by the same spirit of adventure that drove the travellers that employed him. He also notes, "He came from the very poorest. He started as a simple village lad. But in every situation he behaved like a gentleman."

== Bibliography ==
- Clinch, Nicholas; Clinch, Elizabeth (2011), Through a Land of Extremes: The Littledales of Central Asia, The Mountaineers Books, ISBN 978-1-59485-515-3
- Galwan, Ghulam Rassul (1923), Servant of Sahibs: A Book to be Read Aloud, Cambridge: W. Heffer & Sons – via archive.org
- Sheikh, Abdul Ghani (2005). Ladakh: Tahzeeb-o-Saqafat [Ladakh: Civilization and Culture] (in Urdu). Jammu: Crescent House Publications, Jammu, J & K. pp. 378–392.
