= Galwan River =

River in disputed Aksai Chin region

- Mouth of the Galwan River in Ladakh, India to the west of the Sino-Indian Line of Actual Control Galwan River (India)

Location
- Countries: China and India

Physical characteristics
- Source
  - location: Aksai Chin
  - coordinates: 34.73773°N 78.77799°E
  - elevation: 5,450 m (17,880 ft)
- Mouth
  - location: Shyok River
  - coordinates: 34.7491°N 78.1656°E
  - elevation: 4,150 m (13,620 ft)
- Length: 65 km (40 mi)
- Basin size: 1,829 km^{2} (706 sq mi)

Basin features
- River system: Indus River

Galwan River

Chinese name
- Traditional Chinese: 加勒萬河
- Simplified Chinese: 加勒万河
Transcriptions
Standard Mandarin
- Hanyu Pinyin: Jiālèwàn Hé

Hindi name
- Hindi: गलवान नदी

The Galwan River flows from the disputed Aksai Chin area administered by China to the Union Territory of Ladakh, India. It originates near the caravan camping ground of Samzungling on the eastern side of the Karakoram range and flows west to join the Shyok River. The point of confluence is 102 km south of Daulat Beg Oldi. Shyok River itself is a tributary of the Indus River, making Galwan a part of the Indus River system.

The narrow valley of the Galwan River as it flows through the Karakoram mountains has been a flashpoint between China and India in their border dispute. In 1962, a forward post set up by India in the upper reaches of the Galwan Valley caused an "apogee of tension" between the two countries. China attacked and eliminated the post in the 1962 war, reaching its 1960 claim line. In 2020, China attempted to advance further in the Galwan Valley, leading to a bloody clash on 16 June 2020.

== Etymology ==
The river is named after Ghulam Rasool Galwan (1878–1925), a Ladakhi explorer and caravan manager of Kashmiri descent, who accompanied numerous expeditions of European explorers. The river appears with the Galwan name in Survey of India maps from 1940 onwards. (It was earlier unlabelled.)

Folklore holds that in the 1890s, Galwan was part of a British expedition team exploring north of the Chang Chenmo valley, and when the team got caught in a storm Galwan found a way out through the Galwan valley. Harish Kapadia notes that this is one of the rare instances where a major geographical feature was named after a native explorer. (Note: The folklore dates the event to 1892–93 when Galwan accompanied an expedition of Lord Dunmore. This is almost certainly incorrect as Lord Dunmore did not travel through this region. The identity of the 1899 expedition is unknown.)

== Geography ==
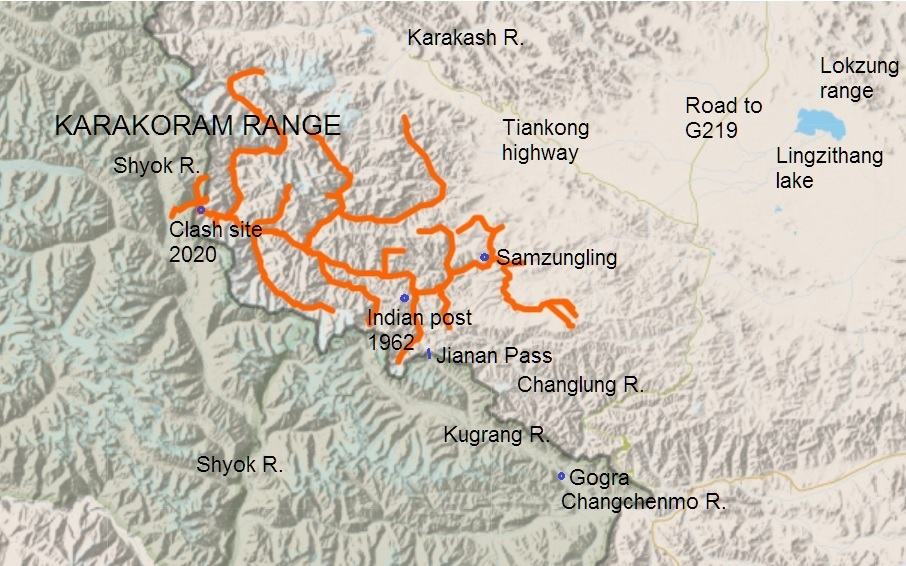
Galwan River basin in the Karakoram mountains

Galwan River in Eastern Ladakh

The Galwan River runs across the entire width of the Karakoram range at this location, for about 30 miles (48 km), where it cuts deep gorges along with its numerous tributaries. At the eastern edge of this 30 mile range, marked by the Samzungling camping ground, the main channel of the Galwan River runs north–south, but several other streams join it as well. To the east of Samzungling, the mountains resemble an elevated plateau, which gradually slopes down to the Lingzi Tang Plains in the east. To the west of Samzungling lie numerous mountains of the Karakoram range, the majority of which are drained by the Galwan River through a multitude of tributaries.

At the northeastern edge of the Galwan River basin, the mountains form a watershed, sending some of their waters into the Karakash River basin. The watershed between the two river basins is difficult to discern, as noted by British cartographers.

To the south of the Galwan River, the Karakoram range divides into two branches, one that lies between the Kugrang and Changlung rivers (both tributaries of Chang Chenmo), and the other to the east of Changlung.

=== Travel routes ===
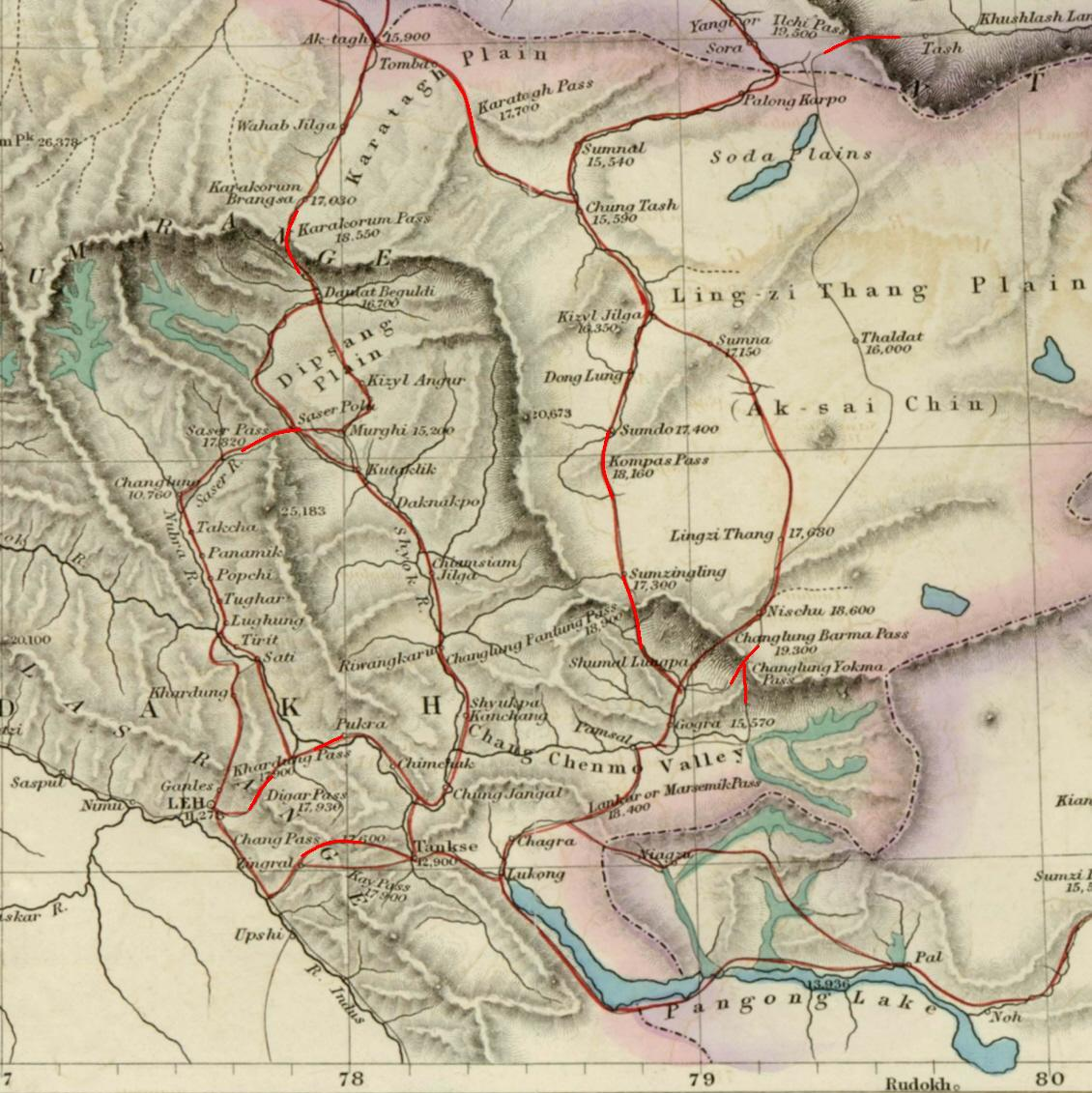
Changchenmo routes through Aksai Chin, showing a western route through Samzungling and an eastern route through Nischu

The narrow gorge of the Galwan river prohibited human movement, and there is no evidence of the valley having been used as a travel route. Samzunling however formed an important halting point of a north–south caravan route (the westernmost "Changchenmo route") to the east of Karakoram range. One reaches Samzungling from the Changchenmo valley by following the channel of the Changlung river and crossing over to the Galwan river basin via the Changlung Pangtung La (Note: Also called Pangtung La. The term "Chunglang Pass" is also used, but best avoided due to confusion with multiple "Changlung passes". The Gazetteer of Kashmir and Ladak lists two passes to the east of Pangtung La: Changlung Burma La and Changlung Yokma La. China uses another pass to the west for its Wenjia Road.) Beyond Samzungling, one follows the Galwan channel to one of its sources, after which the Lingzi Tang plain is entered. The next halting point on the caravan route is Dehra Kompas. Thus the upper Galwan Valley formed a key north–south communication link between the Chang Chenmo valley and the Karakash River basin.

In modern times, the Chinese Wen Jia Road (温加线) traverses this route up to the Galwan River. The eastern route through Nischu now carries the Tiankong Highway (Tianwendian–Kongka highway) and a new Galwan Highway links the two.

== Sino-Indian border dispute ==
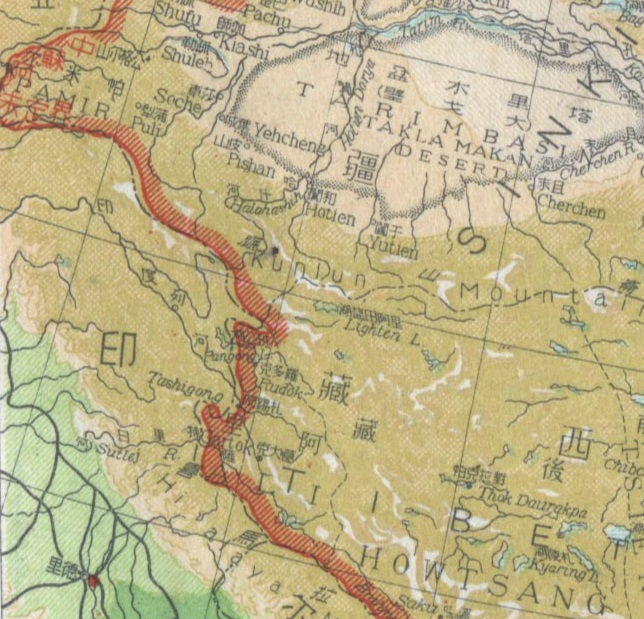
Ladakh border claimed by the Republic of China in a 1947 map. (Note: Even though the map is of very low resolution, it is apparent that the Chip Chap River, a headwater of the Shyok River is shown entirely within Ladakh. Qaratagh-su, a stream that flows down from the Qaratagh Pass and joins the Karakash River is shown as the source of Karakash. Karackattu, The Corrosive Compromise (2020, Figure 1) gives more detailed maps showing Samzungling and Galwan river as part of Ladakh.)

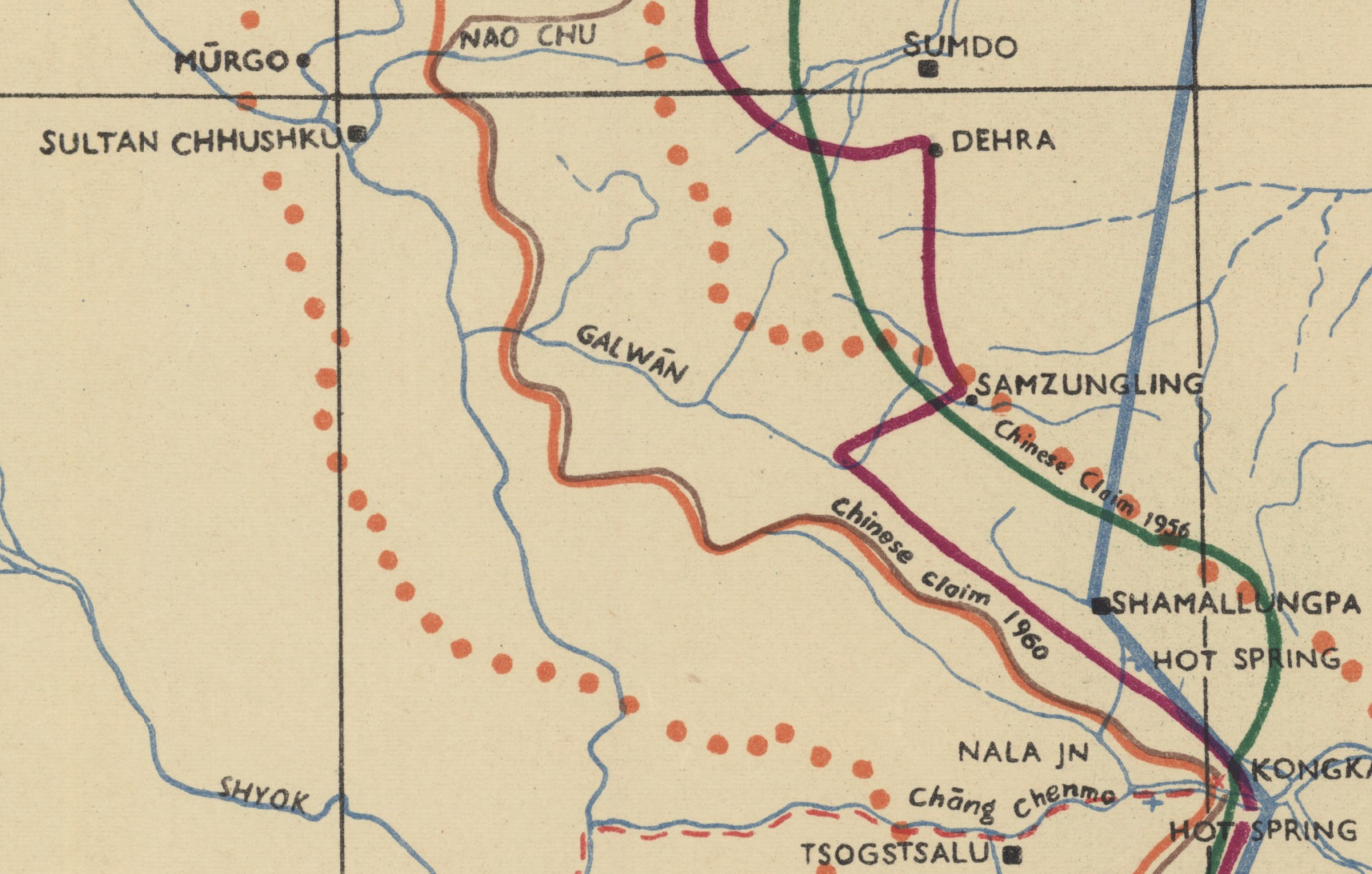
Chinese claim lines in the Galwan valley: 1956 claim line in green, 1960 claim line shown as a dark brown and orange double line. The purple line, drawn by linking the Chinese posts present in September 1992, shows two posts in the Galwan valley: Samzungling and 'Day 9'. (Note: Map by the US Army Headquarters in 1962. In addition to the two claim lines, the blue line indicates the position in 1959, the purple line that in September 1962 prior to the Sino-Indian War, and the orange line, which coincides with the dark brown line, the position the end of the war. The dotted lines bound a 20-km demilitarisation zone proposed by China after the war.) (Note: The purple line's intersection with the Galwan valley indicates the location of a Chinese 'Day 9' post, whose domination by an Indian post on higher ground caused an "apogee of tension".)

There is no evidence of Qing China making any claims on the Aksai Chin plateau. The Republic of China (1912–1949), having faced a revolution in Tibet in 1911, apparently made secret plans to acquire Aksai Chin plateau in order to create a road link between Xinjiang and Tibet. These plans began to get manifested in public maps only towards the end of its rule. While the Republican Chinese claims included the Aksai Chin proper, they stopped at the foot of the Karakoram mountains, leaving all the rivers that flow into the Shyok River within India. (See map.) Communist China also published the "Big Map of the People's Republic of China" in 1956 with a similar boundary, now called the 1956 claim line. In the Galwan Valley, this line just skirted the Samzungling campsite, leaving the rest of the valley within India.

However, in 1960 China advanced its claim line to the western end of the Galwan river, running along the crest of the mountain ridge adjoining the Shyok river valley. The Chinese said little by way of justification for this advancement other than to claim that it was their "traditional customary boundary" which was allegedly formed through a "long historical process". They claimed that the line was altered in the recent past only due to "British imperialism". (Note: But the military justification for the advancement is not hard to see. The 1956 claim line ran along the watershed dividing the Shyok River basin and the Lingzitang lake basin. It conceded the strategic higher ground of the Karakoram Range to India. The 1960 claim line advanced it to the Karakoram ridge line despite the fact that it did not form a dividing line of watersheds.)

Meanwhile, India continued to claim the entire Aksai Chin plateau.

=== 1962 standoff ===
The man moved his head left and right. "They did allow it [the airdrops]... When they allowed it, we supposed it was all part of the cold war and that it would go on like that. And it did go on. You remember, Highness, we established the post in July so that we might cut the supply line to a new Chinese post there on the Galwan. You remember, for it was printed in the news, that we stood firm in spite of all their jeers and threats. They came to within fifteen yards of our post and we said we would shoot if they came nearer. They halted then, and our two governments exchanged notes. They withdrew. Again we supposed that this was all part of the cold war. ... "

— Pearl S. Buck, Mandala

These claims and counterclaims led to a military standoff in the Galwan River valley in 1962.

The Indian Intelligence Bureau proposed in September 1961 that the Galwan Valley should be patrolled and posts established up in the valley because it was strategically connected to the Shyok Valley. Nehru supported the proposal and the CGS (Note: Chief of the General Staff, a senior "staff" appointment. General Kaul had more power than is normally applicable to this role because he had the trust of Nehru.) B. M. Kaul ordered the setting up of a forward post. However, the terrain of the valley proved too difficult for the troops to proceed up the valley. In April 1962, Kaul ordered that a southern route should be tried. By this time, the Chinese had announced that they were resuming patrols and it was also learnt that they had established a post at Samzungling. The Western Command's objections that the establishment of an Indian post would be a provocative act were overruled by the high command.

A platoon of Indian Gorkha troops set out from Hot Springs in the Chang Chenmo Valley, and, by 5 July, arrived at the upper reaches of the Galwan Valley. (Note: The Indian sources state that it took them a month to reach the location, which suggests that the normal travel route via the Changlung river valley might have been invested by Chinese troops. The location of the post is on the bank of a southern tributary of Galwan, called "Shimengou" by the Chinese is to the west of Changlung valley.) They established a post on a ridge overlooking the valley from the south, on the bank of a tributary that China calls "Shimengou". (Note: China provided the coordinates of the post as "34 degrees 37 minutes 30 seconds north, 78 degrees 35 minutes 30 seconds east" (34.625°N 78.5917°E) and described it as "six kilometres inside Chinese territory in the Galwan Valley area".) The post ended up cutting the lines of communication to a Chinese post downstream along the Galwan River, called 'Day 9'. The Chinese interpreted it as a premeditated attack on their post, and surrounded the Indian post, coming within 100 yards of it. (Note: The Economist reported that the Chinese troops came within 15 yards of the post. The "remarkable coolness of the junior Gurkha officer" is said to have persuaded them to pull back.) The Indian government warned China of "grave consequences" and informed them that India was determined to hold the post at all costs. The post remained surrounded for four months and was supplied by helicopters. The Central Intelligence Agency opined that the presence of the post temporarily blocked any further movement of the Chinese troops down the Galwan Valley.

Scholar Taylor Fravel states that the standoff marked the "apogee of tension" for China's leaders. A regimental level headquarters was organised under the chief of staff of the 10th Regiment to assume control of the Chinese forces in the Galwan region. Both Chairman Mao Zedong and the Chinese government were monitoring the situation at the highest level. Termed 'armed coexistence', detailed guidance was issued to the troops on the ground:

Firstly, follow the principle of not firing the first bullet; adopt the measure of 'you encircle me, I encircle you'; 'you cut me off, I cut you off'. Secondly, If Indian forces attack us, warn them, if warning is ineffective time and again, then carry out self defence. While laying siege of Indian forces, try and not to kill them; leave a gap for Indian forces to retreat... If Indian troops do not withdraw, then stalemate them.

The commanders at the front were ordered to report any unexpected situation arising, and ask for instructions without taking initiative on their own accord.

Nevertheless, sporadic firing incidents occurred throughout the western front. At Galwan Valley itself, fire was exchanged on 2 September. As a result of the standoff, the Chinese were compelled to withdraw some of the posts in the Galwan Valley because they could not be supplied. Indian leaders saw this as a sign of success for their forward policy.

=== 1962 war ===
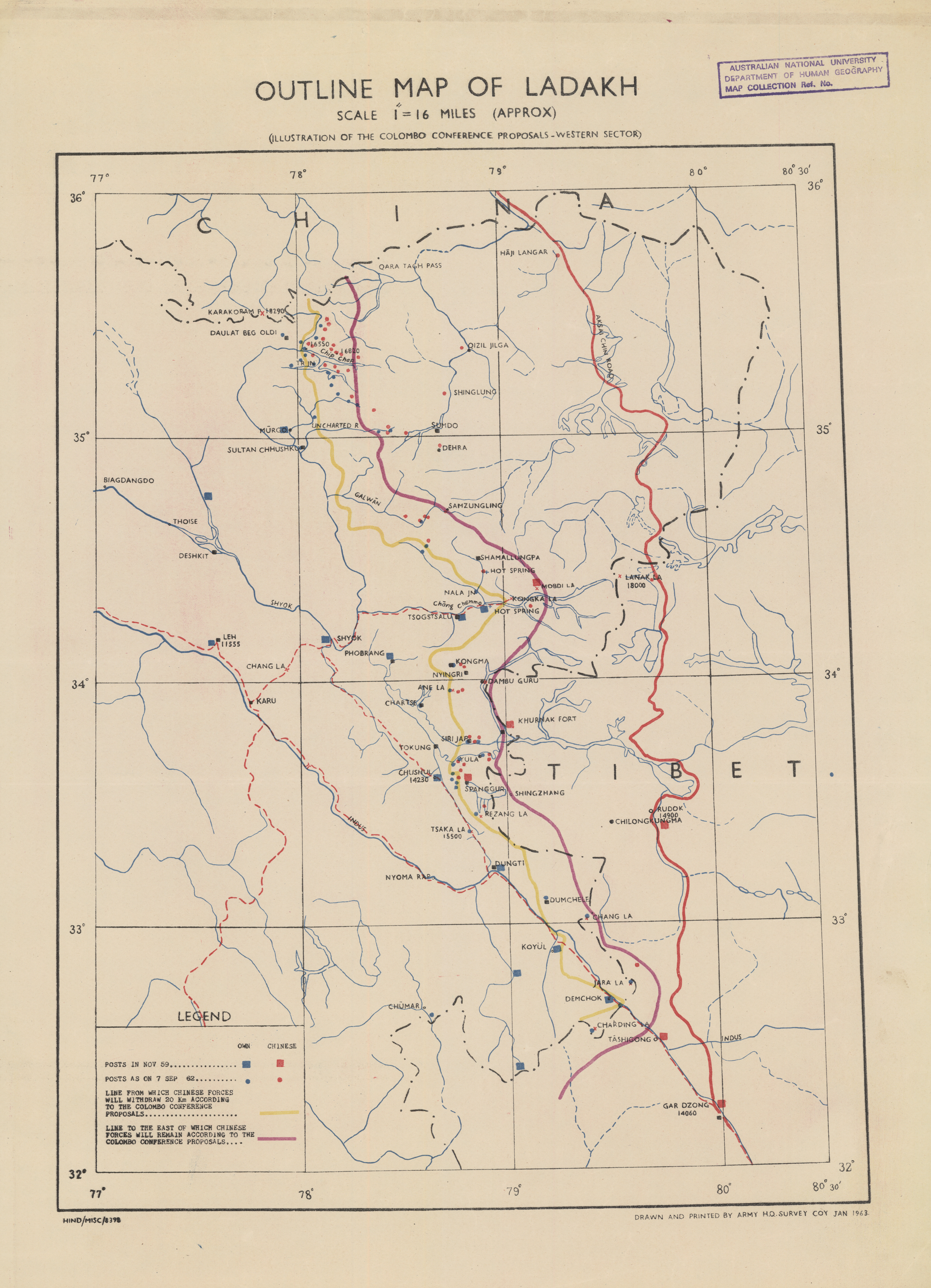
The Colombo proposals for truce

By the time the Sino-Indian War started on 20 October 1962, the Indian post had been reinforced by a company of troops. The Chinese PLA bombarded it with heavy shelling and employed a battalion to attack it. The garrison suffered 33 killed and several wounded, while the company commander and several others were taken prisoner. By the end of the war, China is said to have reached its 1960 claim line. There is however no evidence that the Chinese troops trekked through the Galwan Valley to reach their claim line. (Note: For a map of the Indian and Chinese positions during the war, see Fravel, M. Taylor (2008), Strong Borders, Secure Nation: Cooperation and Conflict in China's Territorial Disputes, Princeton University Press, Map 4.1 China-India Border (Western Sector), p. 179, ISBN 978-1-4008-2887-6) The elimination of the sole Indian post in the Galwan Valley (near the tributary called Shimengou) implied that China had control up to their claim line. The Indian post at the confluence of Galwan with the Shyok River was intact throughout the war and the Chinese never made any contact with it.

The Chinese later claimed, implicitly, via a map annexed to a 1962 letter from then Chinese premier Zhou Enlai to heads of certain Afro-Asian nations, that they had reached the confluence of Galwan with the Shyok River. (Note: The map has been reproduced in a number of places including Manoj Joshi, China’s Galwan valley gambit is attempt to extend official claim line, LAC westward, The Wire, 19 June 2020 (via Observer Research Foundation). The Chinese call the line depicted in the map the "Line of Actual Control of 1959".) However, the Afro-Asian nations, in their Colombo proposals for truce between China and India, drew the line very close to China's 1960 claim line. The Chinese still persist with the line on their maps, calling it the "Line of Actual Control of 1959". (Note: In the midst of the 2020 China-India skirmishes, the Chinese foreign ministry claimed that "the Galwan Valley is located on the Chinese side of the LAC in the western section of the Sino-Indian border". The Indian external affairs ministry responded that such "exaggerated and untenable claims" were not acceptable.)

=== Infrastructure ===
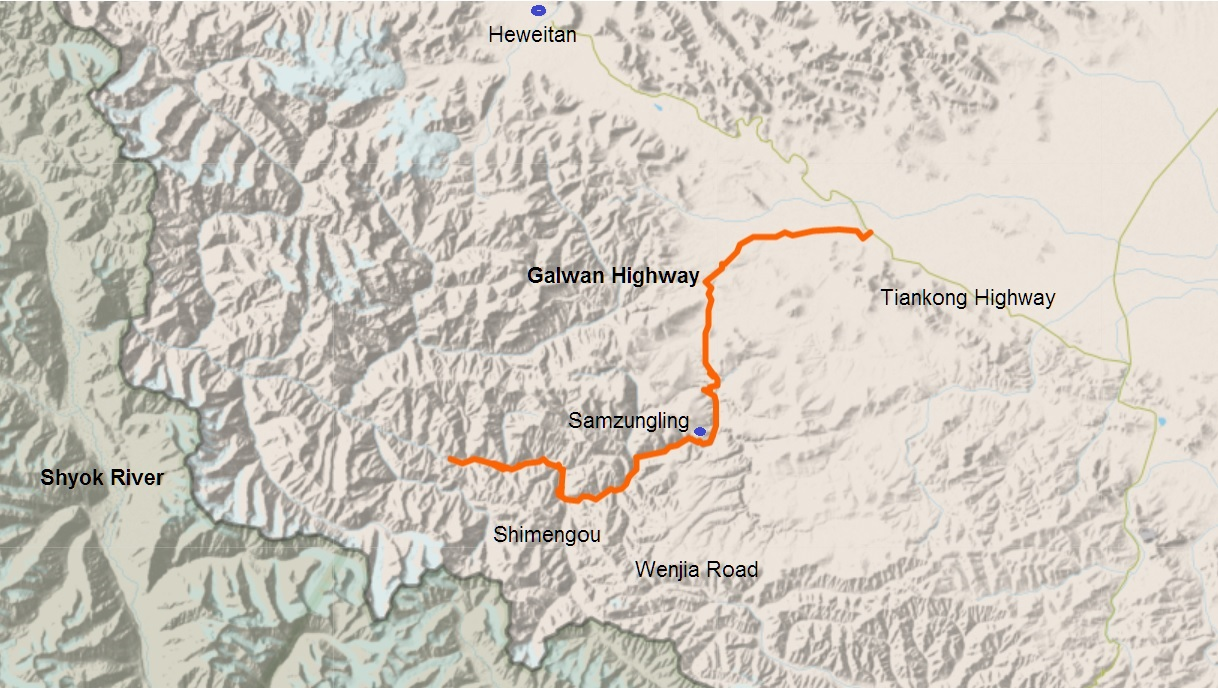
The Chinese Galwan Highway

Prior to the 1962 war, China had already constructed a road linking its bases at Kongka Pass and Heweitan. There was also a feeder road leading to the Samzungling area and covering the southern tributaries such as Shimengou.

Following the war, there was no further activity in the Galwan Valley from either India or China, till about 2003. Between 2003 and 2008, China embarked on a large-scale infrastructure development exercise in the run-up to the Beijing Olympics. Starting in 2010, the Aksai Chin Road (G219) was repaved at a cost of $476 million. Along with it, numerous improvements to the border infrastructure within Aksai Chin also became visible. The existing road to the Heweitan military base was improved and extended under a new name "Tiankong Highway". The feeder road into Galwan Valley was also upgraded to a paved all-weather road and renamed the "Galwan Highway" (Chinese: 加勒万公路; pinyin: Jiā lè wàn gōnglù).

India also commissioned a road link to Daulat Beg Oldi (DBO) at its northern frontier in 2001, scheduled to be completed by 2012. The road would start from the Shyok village and run along the western bank of the Shyok River and then move on to Depsang Plains near Murgo. The initial road did not meet the all-weather requirement, and it had to be rebuilt on an improved alignment later. The road was eventually completed in 2019 and named the Darbuk–Shyok–DBO Road (DS-DBO Road). India also built a military outpost near the confluence of Galwan with the Shyok River, called 'KM 120'. It is said to have been a source of discomfort to China.

In early 2025, high-speed public 4G/5G mobile and internet connectivity was made available by India.

=== 2020 standoff ===
Galwan River at the Line of Actual Control

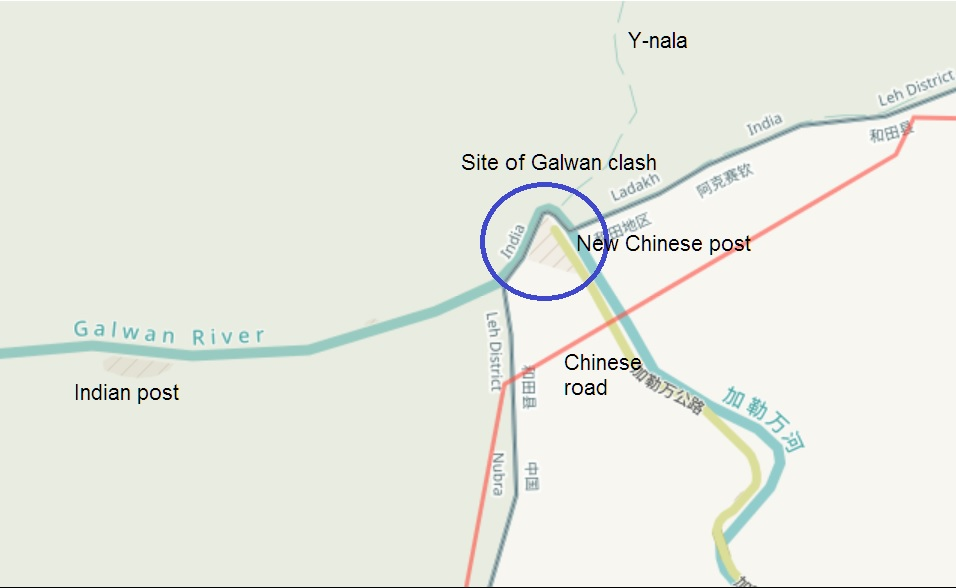
The site of Galwan clash. The red line is the LAC marked by the US Office of Geographer.

China is said to have initiated the construction of a large number of "supporting facilities" in the Galwan Valley in September 2019. These would include dams, bridges, camping grounds and power lines along the existing Galwan Highway, as well as an effort to extend the highway further towards the Line of Actual Control.

In April 2020, India started its own construction efforts to build a feeder road off the DS-DBO Road, along the last 4–5 km stretch of Galwan Valley on its side of the LAC. According to Zhao Lijian, the Chinese Foreign Ministry spokesman, Indian forces started "unilaterally" building roads and bridges in the "Galwan region". They are said to have persisted with their efforts despite repeated protests from China, which allegedly "intensified cross-border troubles". The Indian Army chief dismissed the complaints, saying, "There is no reason for anyone to object. They are doing development on their side, we are doing development on our side."

The problem for China was that its own roadway was still quite far from the LAC. On 5 May 2020, China initiated a standoff by deploying troops in tented posts all along the Galwan Valley. The Chinese also brought in heavy vehicles and monitoring equipment, presumably in an effort to accelerate the road construction. And the Chinese government mouthpiece Global Times initiated a high-pitched rhetoric. India responded by moving its own troops to the area in equal measure. The Chinese eventually set up a post at a 90-degree bend in the river, close to the official LAC, which the Indians regarded as Indian territory and a patrol point (PP-14). The bend was to eventually become the new border.

To create a roadway through the narrow valley, the Chinese bulldozers dug out earth from the cliff sides, and used it to dredge the river bed. The river was constrained to flow in a narrow channel so that the rest of the river bed could be used for traffic and encampments.

Eventually, the standoff led to a violent clash on 15 June near PP-14 in Galwan Valley. Twenty Indian Army soldiers and an unknown number of Chinese soldiers were killed. The causes of the clash remain unclear, but there had been reports, starting 10 June, of a "limited pull-back" agreed by the two sides by 1 to 2 kilometres from the confrontation site. According to a detailed report published by India Today the Chinese had reneged on the agreement and reinstated a post at PP-14, which led to a series of brawls on 15 June, lasting till midnight and causing deaths on both sides. (Note: According to the Indian version of the events, a small contingent of Indian troops led by a colonel went to PP-14 to verify that the Chinese had withdrawn as per agreement. Having found troops there, they challenged it leading to a brawl. The Chinese version says that the clash occurred because the Indian troops had crossed the LAC and acted in an indisciplined way.) A US Congressional review alleged that the Chinese government had planned the clash including its potential for fatalities.

Following the clash, both the sides resumed their construction activity. India completed the contested bridge on the Galwan River by 19 June. China extended its road till India's PP-14 by 26 June, in addition to erecting a full-blown post at the location. The Indians made no attempt to dismantle it a second time.

The final deescalation happened in stages starting 6 July. With China's occupation of PP-14, the effective LAC in the Galwan Valley has shifted by about one kilometre in China's favour.

== Tourism ==
Galwan battlefield is part of the Bharat Ranbhoomi Darshan initiative of the Indian Military which will boost border tourism, patriotism, local infrastructure and economy while reversing civilian outward migration from these remote locations, it entails 77 battleground war memorials in border area including the Longewala War Memorial, Sadhewala War Memorial, Siachen base camp, Kargil, Pangong Tso, Rezang La, Doklam, Bum La, Cho La, Kibithu, etc.

== In popular culture ==
The web series 1962: The War in the Hills is inspired by the events that took place in the Galwan Valley during the 1962 war.

== See also ==
- Line of Actual Control
- India-China Border Roads
- Sino-Indian border dispute

== Bibliography ==
- Gazetteer of Kashmir and Ladak, Calcutta: Superintendent of Government Printing, 1890
- Fisher, Margaret W.; Rose, Leo E.; Huttenback, Robert A. (1963), Himalayan Battleground: Sino-Indian Rivalry in Ladakh, Praeger – via archive.org
- Gupta, Shishir (2014), The Himalayan Face-Off: Chinese Assertion and the Indian Riposte, Hachette India, ISBN 978-93-5009-606-2
- Hoffmann, Steven A. (1990), India and the China Crisis, University of California Press, ISBN 978-0-520-06537-6
- Kler, Gurdip Singh (1995), Unsung Battles of 1962, Lancer Publishers, ISBN 978-1-897829-09-7
- Hudson, G. F. (1963), "Aksai Chin", Far Eastern Affairs, St. Antony's Papers, vol. 14, London: Chatto & Windus
- Johri, Sitaram (1969), Chinese Invasion of Ladakh, Himalaya Publications
- Karackattu, Joe Thomas (2020). "The Corrosive Compromise of the Sino-Indian Border Management Framework: From Doklam to Galwan". Asian Affairs. 51 (3): 590–604. doi:10.1080/03068374.2020.1804726. ISSN 0306-8374. S2CID 222093756.
- Mullik, B. N. (1971), My Years with Nehru: The Chinese Betrayal, Allied Publishers
- Sandhu, P. J. S.; Shankar, Vinay; Dwivedi, G. G. (2015), 1962: A View from the Other Side of the Hill, Vij Books India Pvt Ltd, ISBN 978-93-84464-37-0
- Van Eekelen, Willem Frederik (1967), Indian Foreign Policy and the Border Dispute with China, Springer, ISBN 978-94-017-6555-8
  - Van Eekelen, Willem (2015), Indian Foreign Policy and the Border Dispute with China: A New Look at Asian Relationships, BRILL, ISBN 978-90-04-30431-4
