= Kongka Pass =

Mountain pass in India and China

- Standard Tibetan: དགུན་ཁ་ལ
- Location within Ladakh Location within Southern Xinjiang Location within Ngari
- Elevation: 5,171 metres (16,965 ft)

Third Approach
- Location: India–China border
- Range: Karakoram
- Coordinates: 34°20′06″N 79°02′07″E

Kongka Pass
- Traditional Chinese: 空喀山口
- Simplified Chinese: 空喀山口
Transcriptions
Standard Mandarin
- Hanyu Pinyin: Kōngkā shānkǒu

The Kongka Pass or Kongka La (Tibetan: དགུན་ཁ་ལ, Wylie: dgun kha la, THL: gün kha la) is a low mountain pass on the Line of Actual Control between India and China in eastern Ladakh. It lies on a spur of the Karakoram range that intrudes into the Chang Chenmo Valley adjacent to the disputed Aksai Chin region. China claimed the location as its border in a 1956 map, and attacked an Indian patrol party in 1959 killing ten policemen and apprehending ten others. Known as the Kongka Pass incident, the event was a milestone in the escalation of the border dispute between the two countries.

== Name ==
In the Ladakhi language, Kongka (Tibetan: གོང་ཀ, Wylie: gong ka) means a "low pass or ridge, high point or rise of a plateau". In the first reference we have of this pass, it was called "Salmu Kongka" and explained as a "small pass".

A Tibetan name for the pass is now in circulation, as "Kongka La" (Tibetan: དགུན་ཁ་ལ, Wylie: dgun kha la, THL: gün kha la), which can be interpreted as a "wintertime pass".

== Geography ==
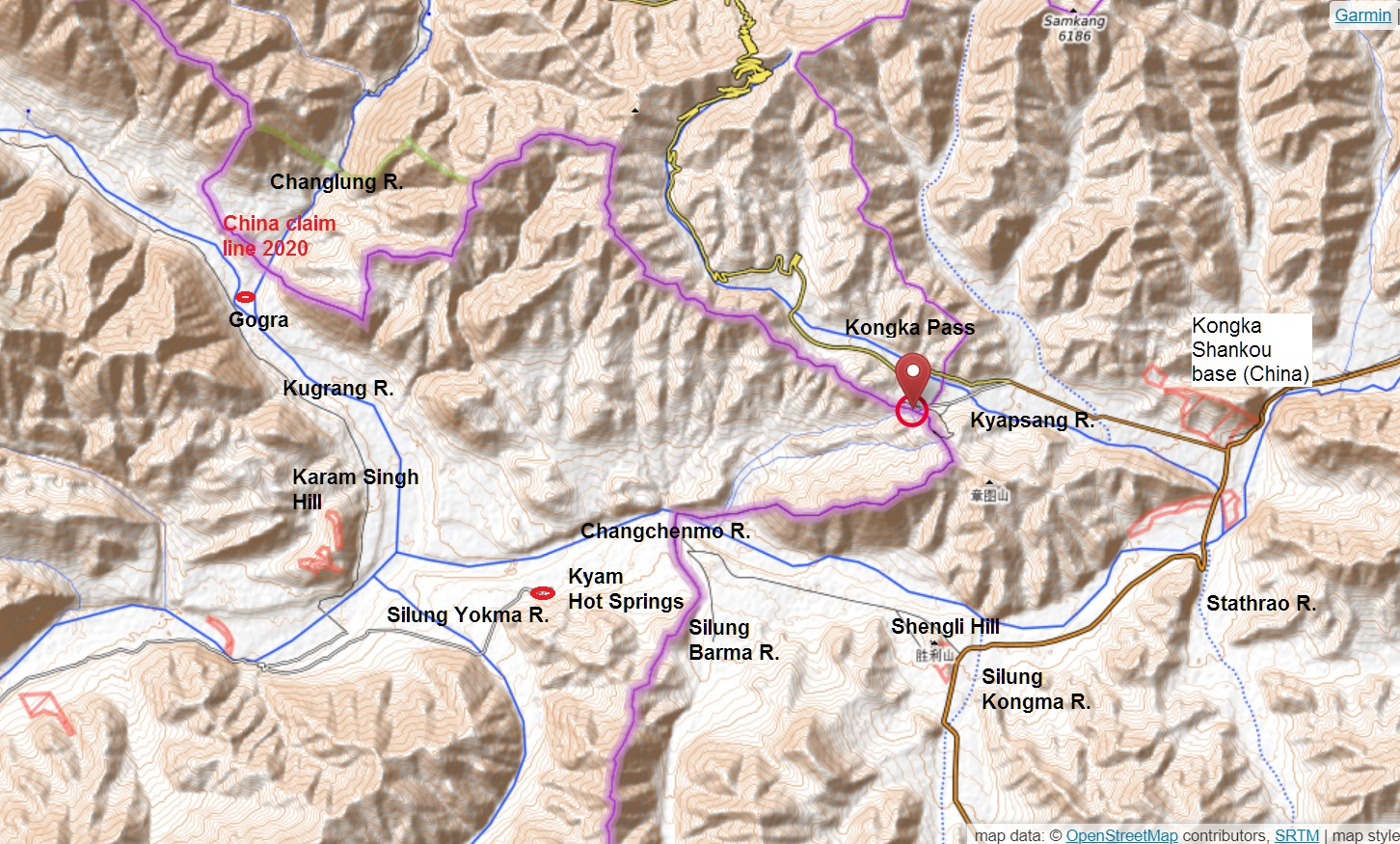
Map 1: Area around the Kongka Pass

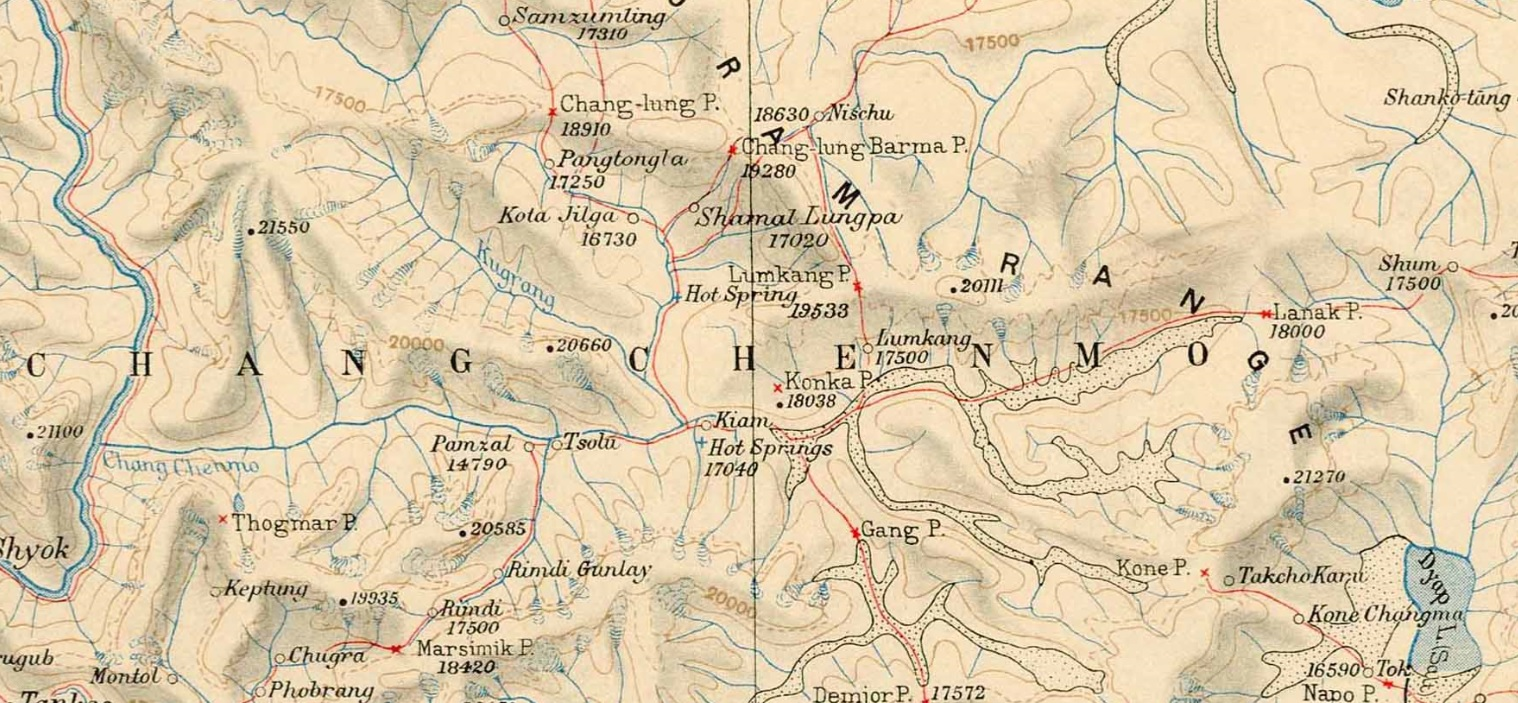
Map 2: Map including Konka Pass (Survey of India, 1916)

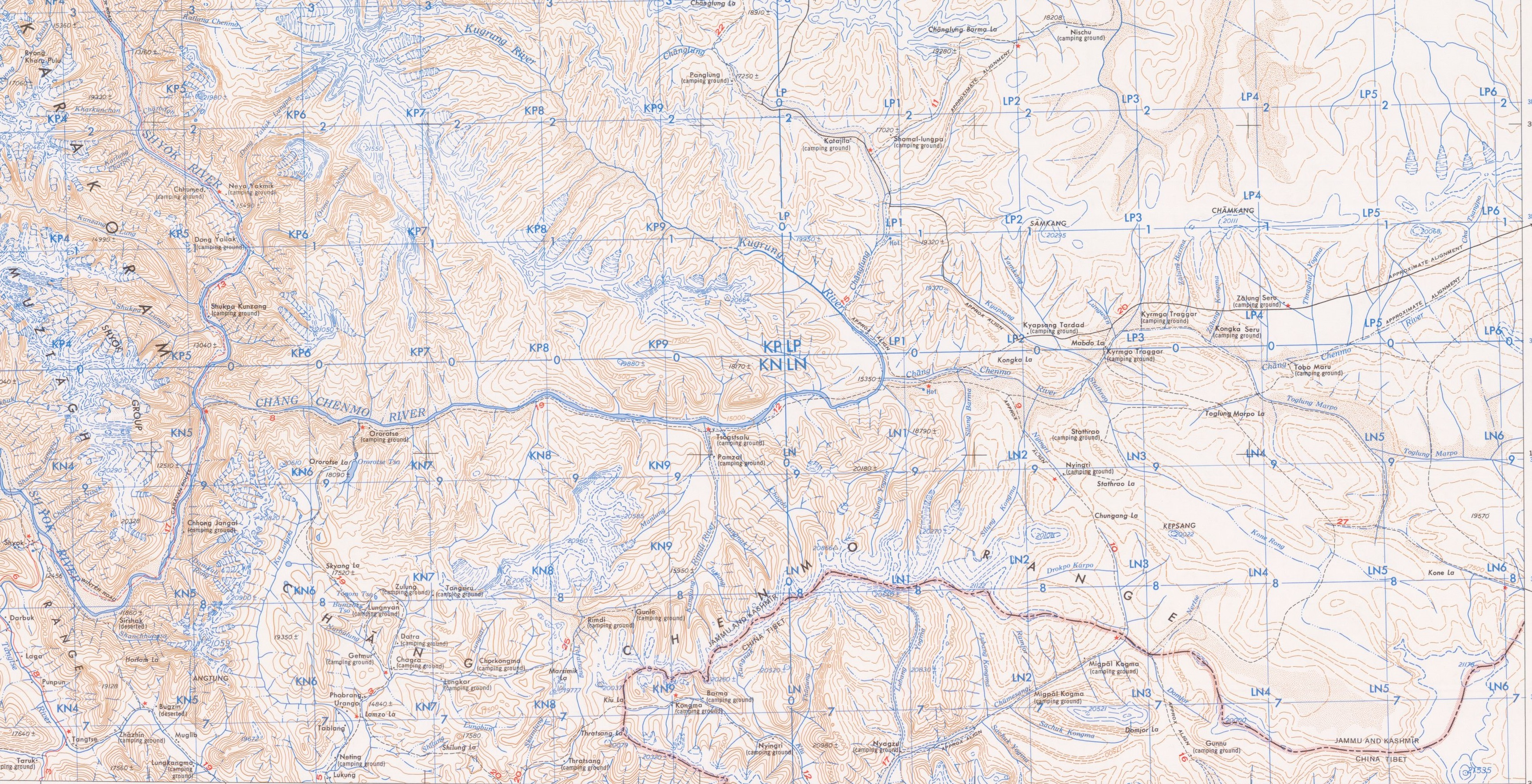
Map 3: Map of the Chang Chenmo Valley and the prevailing border at India's independence (AMS, 1955) (Note: From map: "THE DELINEATION OF INTERNATIONAL BOUNDARIES ON THIS MAP MUST NOT BE CONSIDERED AUTHORITATIVE")

The Chang Chenmo Valley lies in a depression between the Karakoram Range in the north and the Changchenmo Range in the south. (Note: The depression continues into Tibet, all the way to Yeshil Kul (Bangda Co) and Lake Lighten (Gozha Co) on the Khotan border. The depression is now recognized as a geological fault called the Longmu Co fault, part of the larger Longmu–Guozha Co fault system.) Immediately to the north of the Chang Chenmo Valley, the Karakoram Range splits into multiple branches, with one of the branches (called "Karakoram-I" by some authors) forming a dividing ridge between the Kugrang River in the west and the Changlung and Kyapsang rivers in the east. A spur of this branch extends into the Chang Chenmo Valley for some distance, forcing the Changchenmo river to bend around it. On this spur lies the low pass of Kongka Pass, essentially forming a part of the general depression that is the Chang Chenmo valley.

To all appearances, the Kongka Pass was an unimportant saddle point, while the normal travel route followed the course of the Changchenmo river. (Maps 2 and 3) However, it was also possible to travel east by ascending the pass, especially in wintertime when the river area might be icy. Arthur Douglas Carey and Andrew Delgleish used the pass in 1885 in travelling from Ladakh to Keriya.

Since 1959, the Kongka Pass formed part of the dividing line between India and China, China having extended its claims till this point. (Map 4) Kongka Pass is also on the dividing line between China's Xinjiang and Tibet autonomous regions. The Chang Chenmo Valley to the east of here is part of Tibet; the Aksai Chin region to the north is part of Xinjiang. China has a large military base at the bottom of the Kyapsang river valley, called the Kongka Shankou base near a saddle point called Mobdo La. (Map 3)

In the Indian-controlled territory immediately to the west of Kongka Pass lie the notable Hot Springs (at a location called Kyam or Kiam). This location is roughly the point where the bend in the Changchenmo river ends, and river flows due west. To the northwest of here extends the Kugrang river valley, with the campsite of Gogra at short distance above. At Gogra, the Changlung river flows down and joins the Kugrang river. Indian Military has termed the Kiam Hotsprings-Kongka Pass eastward route as the patrol point PP-17A (map 1).

To the south of the Kongka Pass, three tributaries, all called "Silung", flow down from the Changchenmo Range to join Changchenmo. From the west to east, they are referred to as Silung Yokma, Silung Barma and Silung Kongma (the lower, middle and upper Silungs). Further east is another tributary called Stathrao. On a tributary of Silung Kongma called Nyingri lies the route to the Pangong Lake region, via Kyungang La, (Note: Spelt as "Kyungang La" by Strachey and "Kiung Gang La" in later British writings, the pass is known to Tibetans as Gyagong La (Tibetan: རྒྱ་གོང་ལ, Wylie: rgya gong la). It is marked as "Gang Pass" on Map 2 and "Chungang La" on Map 3. Border guards from Rudok were said to have been stationed here during the summer months. But later information (1898) said that they were placed in campsites in the Chumesang valley to the south of the pass.) which was once regarded as the boundary between Ladakh and Tibet. (Map 3) At present, Silung Yokma lies in the Indian-controlled territory and the rest lie in Chinese-controlled territory.

== Sino-Indian border dispute ==
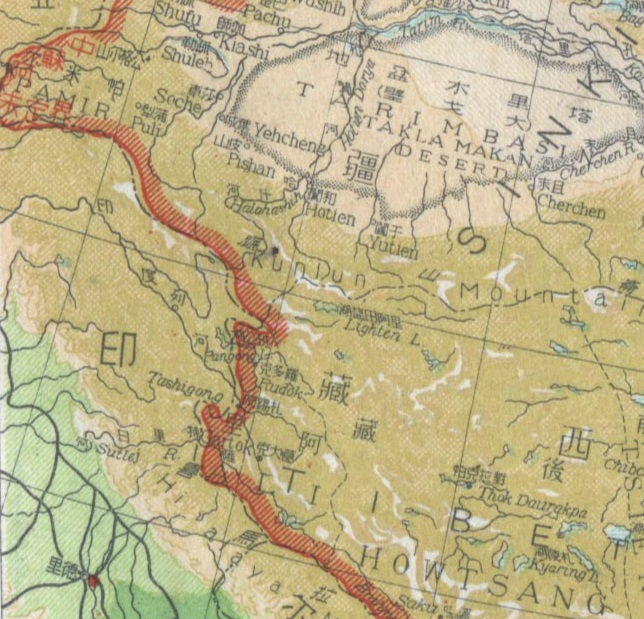
Map 3: 1947 map of Republic of China showing Lanak La as the border

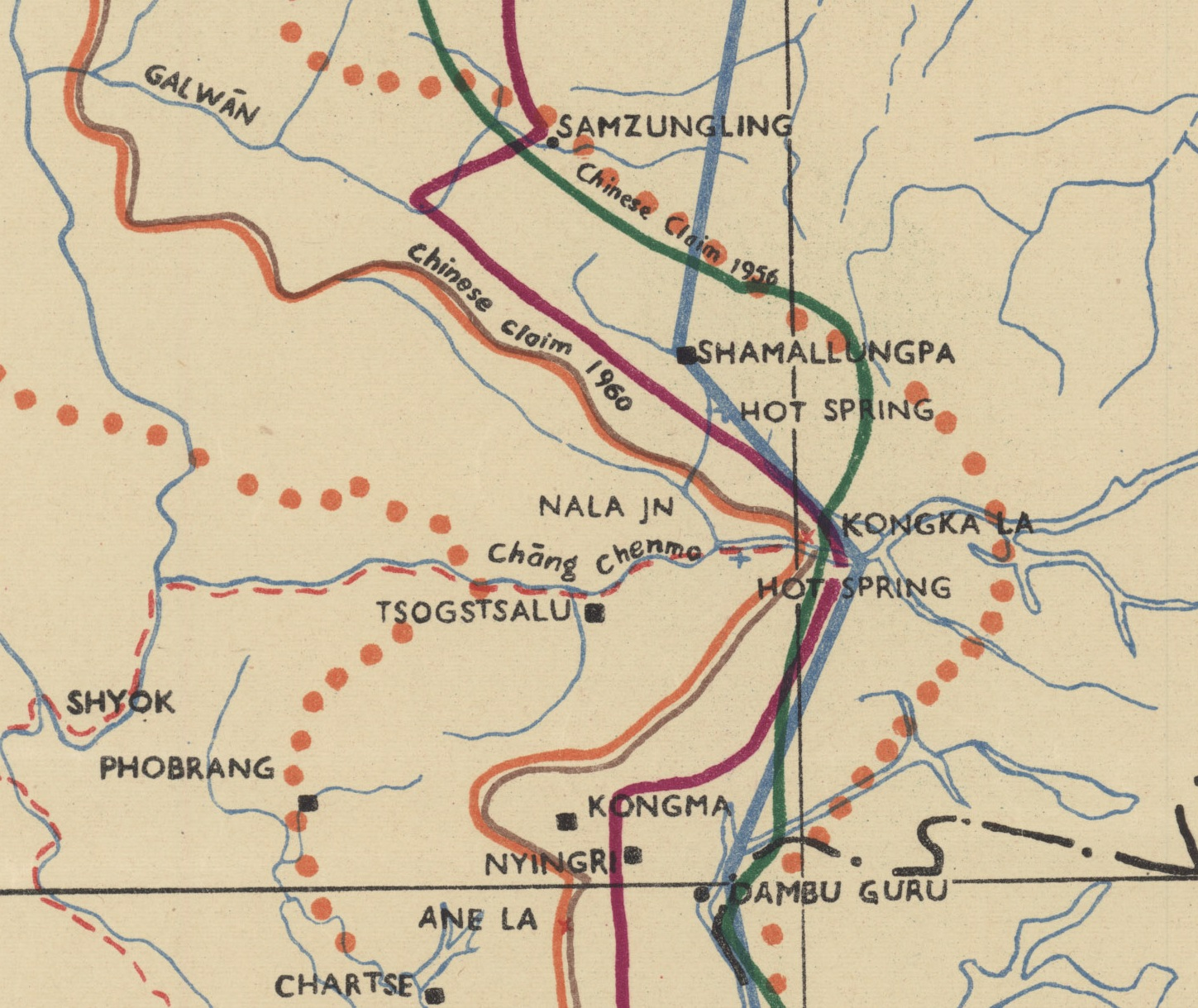
Map 4: Chinese claim lines near the Kongka Pass: 1956 claim line in green, 1960 claim line in dark brown and 1962 cease-fire line in orange

Colonial-era British sources state that the traditional boundary between Ladakh and Tibet, accepted by both sides, was at Lanak La, where the Changchenmo River originates. Chinese maps had recognised Lanak La as the boundary at least till 1951.

In 1952, Indian patrol teams had reached till Lanak La without encountering any Chinese presence. When enquired in 1954 and again in 1956 about demarcating boundaries in the sector, Zhou Enlai replied that the PRC government was still printing Kuomintang maps and had not had the time to prepare their own maps. While maintaining this position, the Chinese would lay the Sianking–Tibet road (now G219) through Aksai Chin to Indian objections and even imprison a two-men strong patrol party.

In 1956, a map was published that marked Kongka Pass as the boundary in the Chang Chenmo Valley; three years hence, Zhou would note this particular map to be an accurate representation of Chinese position and claim Kongka Pass to be the "traditional customary boundary" of China. Leo E. Rose and Wim van Eekelen find such claims to be inconsistent with the available evidence.

=== Kongka Pass incident ===
In October 1959, an Indian police party (Note: The Indian team was made up of personnel from the Central Reserve Police Force (CRPF), who were loaned to the Intelligence Bureau for border security and intelligence-gathering functions. They were dubbed the "India–Tibet Border Force", but they are not to be confused with the paramilitary force called Indo-Tibetan Border Police, which was a later formation.) was sent to set up posts in three locations — Tsogtsalu, Hot Springs and Shamal Lungpa — which were in undisputed Indian territory per the recent Chinese maps. The party was led by an Intelligence Bureau officer of the rank of Deputy Superintendent, Karam Singh, who was an experienced patroller in Ladakh. As late as June 1958, Singh had led patrols to Lanak La without incidents. Singh states that they had established a post at Hot Springs and were about to head to Shamal Lungpa when, on 20 October, two men sent out for reconnaissance went missing. According to the Chinese version of the events these two men had crossed the "traditional border at Kongka Pass", leading to their detention. Later information reveals that the location was on the bank of the Chang Chenmo River, somewhere between the mouth of Silung Barma and that of Silung Kongma.

The same evening, Singh dispatched a 10-men-strong party to investigate the disappearance, who returned late night and reported extensive hoof-marks in the region suggesting the presence of Chinese cavalry. On the morning of 21 October, a forward search party of 20 men set out on ponies under Singh; the rest was ordered to follow on foot under another commander called Tyagi. Singh chose to follow the hoof-marks near Kongka Pass and lost contact with Tyagi's men. Singh encountered Chinese soldiers on top of a hill, (Note: According to Chinese sources, the site is a small independent hill to the south of the Chang Chenmo River, which was later named Shengli Hill (Chinese: 胜利山; pinyin: Shènglì shān; "Victory Hill").) who belonged to the 6th Cavalry Regiment and were well-entrenched in their position. A firefight ensued after negotiations failed. Nine Indian policemen were killed during the engagement, one died later of his injuries, and seven were taken prisoner. One Chinese soldier of the rank of "Deputy Squadron Leader" was killed too. It appears that Tyagi's men were informed of the firefight by one of Singh's constables but they were under simultaneous attack and failed to be of any help; however, his team incurred no fatalities despite injuries on several men. On 22 October, Tyagi retreated to Tsogtsalu and four severely injured men were evacuated by air.

After release, Karam Singh reported that the detained personnel were put in a storage pit for four days under severe climatic conditions without water, refused medical attention, interrogated in 12 hour stretches for further several days, induced to sign false confessions about them being responsible for the episode, window-dressed for photographs, and finally returned to India on 14 November. The bodies of the dead soldiers were returned a day earlier at the new border of Kongka Pass and China rejected payment of any compensation. Scholar John Rowland states that, through these means, China obtained the "evidence" it needed to claim that it was India that broke the Panchsheel (peace agreement between the two countries) unprovoked. China however rejected Singh's testimony and charged Indian Government of promoting Sinophobic sentiments. (Note: The government accepted that their troops might have failed in providing optimum care for the first few days, since such an event was wholly unanticipatable.)

Indian Army castigated the Intelligence Bureau for causing mindless provocations at the frontiers without bringing them in confidence and from 1 November, took charge of manning all border-posts in the sector. Throughout the time of the detention, China claimed that Kongka Pass was patrolled by their troops ever since liberation of Tibet and that the episode happened only due to unprovoked aggression by Indian side; threats were made to infiltrate NEFA if Indian patrols were to disregard Chinese claims in the Ladakh sector. Public protests called for resignation of defence minister Krishna Menon and abandonment of non-alignment as a strategic policy. Indian media described the event as a "brutal massacre of an Indian police party" with The Indian Express carrying an editorial about how Nehru had ignored the "menace of Han expansionism and Communist Imperialism." The incident contributed to the heightening of tensions that led to the Sino-Indian War in 1962.

== Military posts and infrastructure ==
Map 5: China's Kongka Shankou base

The Indian border post is located 3 kilometres (1.9 mi) to the west of Kongka Pass at Hot Springs. A war-memorial is situated at the place.

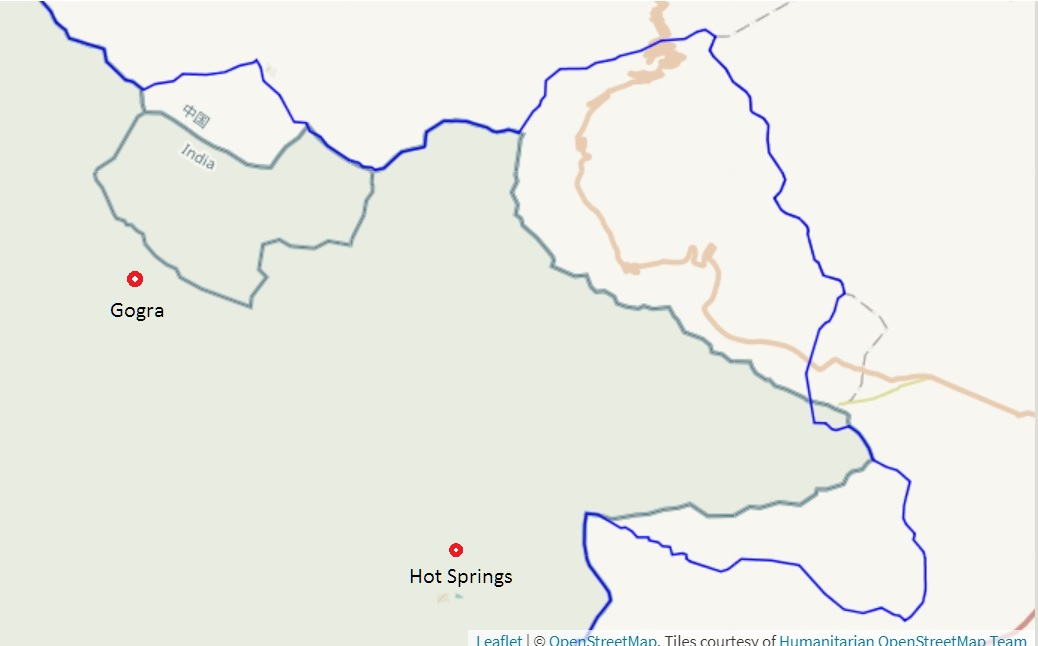
Map 6: Line of Actual Control near Kongka La, as marked by the US Office of the Geographer in 2013 (in blue), and as marked by OpenStreetMap in 2020 (in green)

The Chinese border outpost is located a few kilometers to the east at an elevation of 5,070 metres (16,630 ft). Called Kongka Shankou base, it is located at the junction of the Kyapsang and Chang-Chenmo rivers. The outpost is linked to the China National Highway 219 (G219) via two highways.

- The Konghong Highway (空红线, S519), or Kongka–Hongshan Highway, runs along the Chang-Chenmo Valley via Lanak La, and meets G219 near the Sumzhi and Longmu lakes.
  - A new road called Kongka Shankou Highway (空喀山口公路) has been laid along the continuation of the same depression as the Changchenmo Valley on the other side of G219. It meets the China National Highway 216 (G216) near the Yueya Lake.
- The Banying Highway (班应线, S520) goes south from the Kongka Shankou base to the Khurnak Plain and runs along the northern shore of the Pangong Lake till it reaches the G219 highway.

The Indian government has noted that the original versions of these roads were built during 1959–1962.

In addition to these, a Tiankong Highway (天空线) or Tianwendian–Kongka Highway, appears to have been constructed between 2013 and 2020. It passes through territory marked as being on the Indian side of the Line of Actual Control by the US Office of the Geographer in 2013. It is a mountain road that runs till the Tianwendian post in the Depsang Plains. It runs parallel to the Line of Actual Control and passes through Nischu and Heweitan. It also connects to the Wenjia Road (Chinese: 温加线; pinyin: Wēn jiā xiàn), which leads to the Galwan Valley.

== See also ==
- List of locations in Aksai Chin

== Bibliography ==
- Gazetteer of Kashmir and Ladak, Calcutta: Superintendent of Government Printing, 1890 – via archive.org
  - Maisey, Lieutenant F. (1995) [1878], Topography, Ethnology, Resources & History of Ladak (Central Asia, Part VII, Section II), Petersfield, England: Barbican – via archive.org
- Fisher, Margaret W.; Rose, Leo E.; Huttenback, Robert A. (1963), Himalayan Battleground: Sino-Indian Rivalry in Ladakh, Praeger – via archive.org
- Hoffmann, Steven A. (October–December 1973), "Perceived Hostility and the Indian Reaction to China", India Quarterly, 20 (4): 283–299, doi:10.1177/097492847302900401, JSTOR 45070057, S2CID 152421080
- Hoffmann, Steven A. (1990), India and the China Crisis, University of California Press, ISBN 978-0-520-06537-6
- Johri, Sitaram (1969), Chinese Invasion of Ladakh, Himalaya Publications
- Rowland, John (1967), A History of Sino-Indian Relations: Hostile Co-existence, Van Nostrand, ISBN 9780442070854
- Sandhu, P. J. S.; Shankar, Vinay; Dwivedi, G. G. (2015), 1962: A View from the Other Side of the Hill, Vij Books India Pvt Ltd, ISBN 978-93-84464-37-0
