= Hot Springs, Chang Chenmo Valley =

Indian border outpost in Ladakh, India

Hot Springs Kyam
- Border checkpost
- Location within Ladakh Location within India
- Coordinates: 34°17′58″N 78°57′00″E
- Country: India
- Union territory: Ladakh
- District: Leh
- Elevation: 4,700 m (15,400 ft)

Hot Springs (traditional name: Kyam) is a campsite and the location of an Indian border outpost in the Chang Chenmo River valley in Ladakh near the disputed border with China. It is so named because there is a hot spring at this location. The Line of Actual Control near Kongka Pass is only 3 kilometres (2 mi) to the east.

== Name ==
Historically, the name for the hot spring was Kyam (Kiam, Kayam). The Chinese still refer to it by this name.

== Geography ==
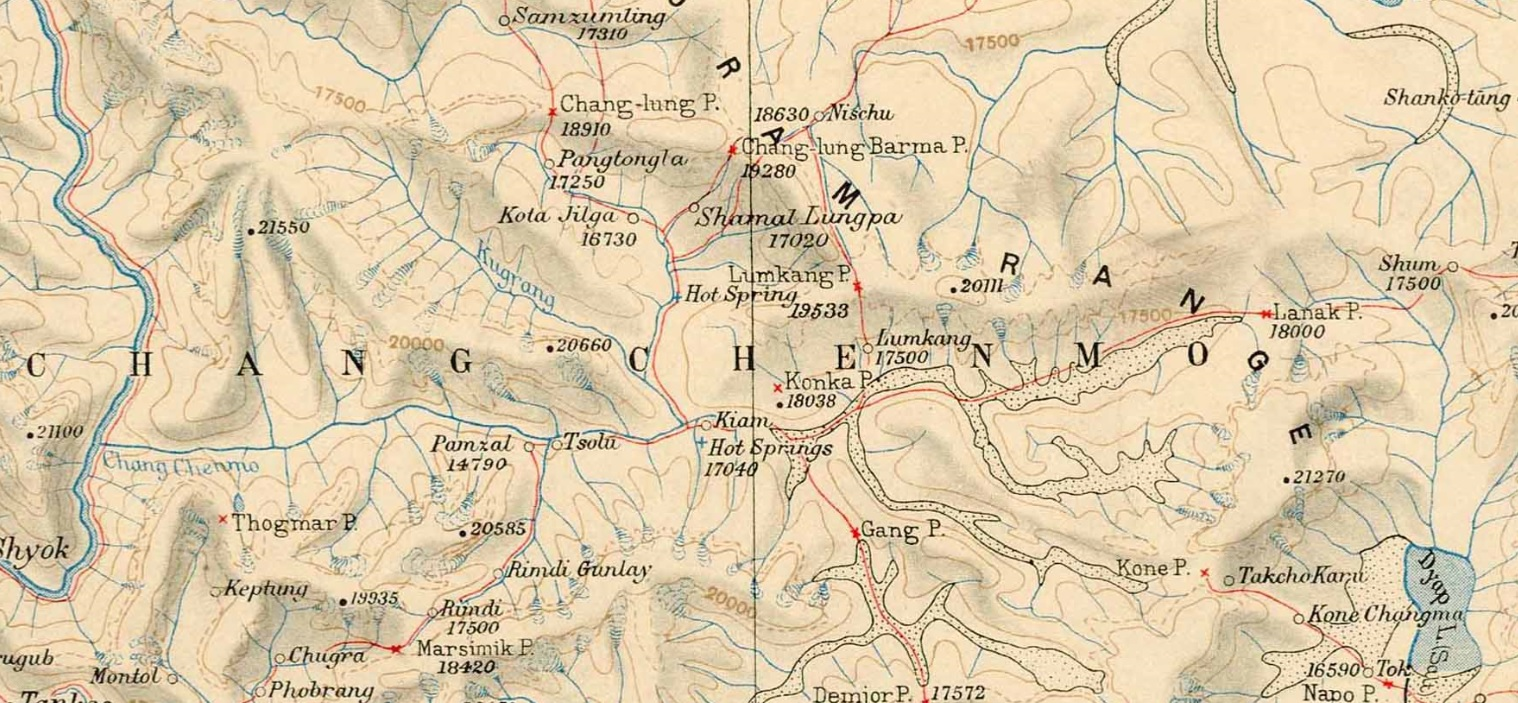
Changchenmo Valley in a Survey of India map of 1916

Geologist Frederic Drew states that the Chang Chenmo river flows on a barren gravel bed, with occasional alluvial patches where vegetation is found. Hot Springs is one such location. In the vicinity are also other such patches, named Pamzal, Tsogtsalu (or Tsolu) and Gogra. They were historical halting places for travellers and trading caravans, with a supply of water, fuel and fodder. Nomadic Ladakhi graziers also used them for grazing cattle.

A large tributary called Kugrang joins the Chang Chenmo River near Hot Springs. Gogra is in the valley of the Kugrang River, northwest of Hot Springs. The Changlung River flows in from the northeast to join Kugrang at this location.

According to the Gazetteer of Kashmir and Ladak, there are "celebrated" hot springs at Kyam, which were visited by the Ladakhis of the Pangong district and the Tibetans of the Rudok district. The water had a temperature of 179 °F (82 °C) in August and was suffused with soda and sulphur. The local people believed that it was beneficial for ailments like rheumatism. The springs are believed to arise from the geological fault represented by the Changchenmo Valley, which separates the Paleozoic, Triassic and Jurassic rocks of the Karakoram range to the north from the older Paleozoic rocks to the south. (Note: The Changchenmo depression is now recognized as a geological fault called the Longmu Co fault, part of the larger Longmu–Gozha Co fault system.)

== Transport ==
Within India, it is reachable via Tsogtsalu, which is further connected to mainland India via two motorable roads, the "Phobrang-Marsimik La-Tsogtsalu-Hot Springs Road" (PMTHR) or "Marsimik La Road" via Phobrang-Marsimik La-Tsogstsalu to Hot Springs, and via the other alternate route the 55 km long "Changchenmo-Tsogtsalu Road" (CTR) from confluence of Changchenmo & Shyok River to Tsogtsalu.

== History ==
In the late 1800s, the Maharaja Ranbir Singh at the request of the British made improvements to the trails and facilities of the Gogra campsite in order to improve trade with Yarkand. The valley was also a popular hunting spot for British officers on leave.

In Autumn 1959, the Kongka Pass incident occurred near here. At the time, the Central Reserve Police Force (CRPF) personnel (Note: The units manning the post were called "Indo-Tibetan Border Force" but they were regular members of the CRPF. The present Indo-Tibetan Border Police was raised later in 1962.) were given the mandate of constructing this camp. During the construction, the scouting team was captured by the PLA who had advanced to Kongka Pass since the previous years. On 21 October, the search team tasked to find the missing scouts encountered the Chinese and were caught in a firefight. That led to the death of 9 members during the firefight and 1 member later due to his injuries. (Note: B. N. Mullik dedicated his book "The Chinese Betrayal" to the nine policemen who lost their lives on 21 October 1959 near Hot Springs.) They have been since honored as martyrs by the law enforcement in India annually on this day. In the 1960s, a Police Memorial was erected here at Hot Springs.

== See also ==
Hot Springs, Chang Chenmo Valley
- Traditional Chinese: （基阿姆）溫泉
- Simplified Chinese: （基阿姆）温泉
Transcriptions
Standard Mandarin
- Hanyu Pinyin: (Jī ā mǔ) wēnquán

- Hot Springs, Changlung Valley
- Jianan Pass – a border pass in the Kugrang Valley, sometimes called "Hot Springs".
- List of hot springs in Ladakh

== Bibliography ==
- Gazetteer of Kashmir and Ladak, Calcutta: Superintendent of Government Printing, 1890
