= Chang Chenmo River =

River in China and India

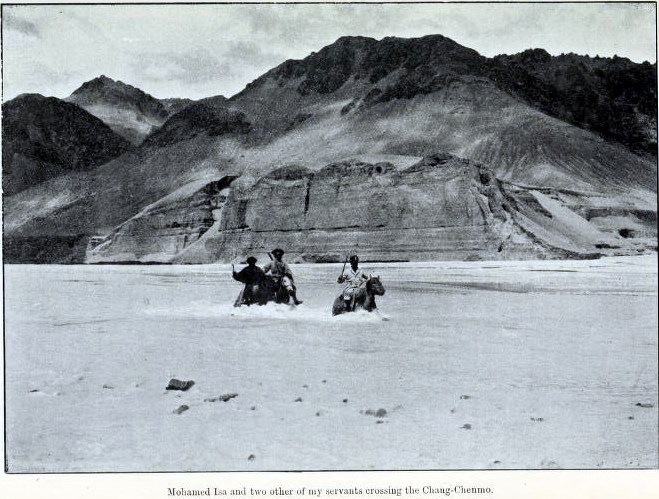

- Location within Ladakh Location within India

Location
- Country: India, China
- State / Province: Ladakh (India), Tibet Autonomous Region (China)

Physical characteristics
- Source: Lanak La
  - location: Rutog County
  - coordinates: 34.3542°N 79.5446°E
- Mouth: Shyok River
  - location: Ladakh
  - coordinates: 34.2758°N 78.2889°E
  - elevation: 12,000 feet (3,700 m)
- Length: 70 miles (110 km)
- Basin size: 4,170 km^{2} (1,610 sq mi)

Basin features
- River system: Indus Basin

Chang Chenmo River or Changchenmo River is a tributary of the Shyok River, part of the Indus River system. It is at the southern edge of the disputed Aksai Chin region and north of the Pangong Lake basin in Ladakh.

The source of Chang Chenmo is near the Lanak Pass in the Chinese-administered region of Jammu & Kashmir (as part of the Rutog County in Tibet). The river flows west from Lanak La. At the middle of its course lies the Kongka Pass, part of the Line of Actual Control between India and China passes. Continuing west, the river enters a deep gorge in the Karakoram Range until it joins the Shyok River in Ladakh.

== Name ==
Chang Chenmo means "Great Northern" in Tibetic languages. It is primarily the name of the valley rather than the river.

== Geography ==
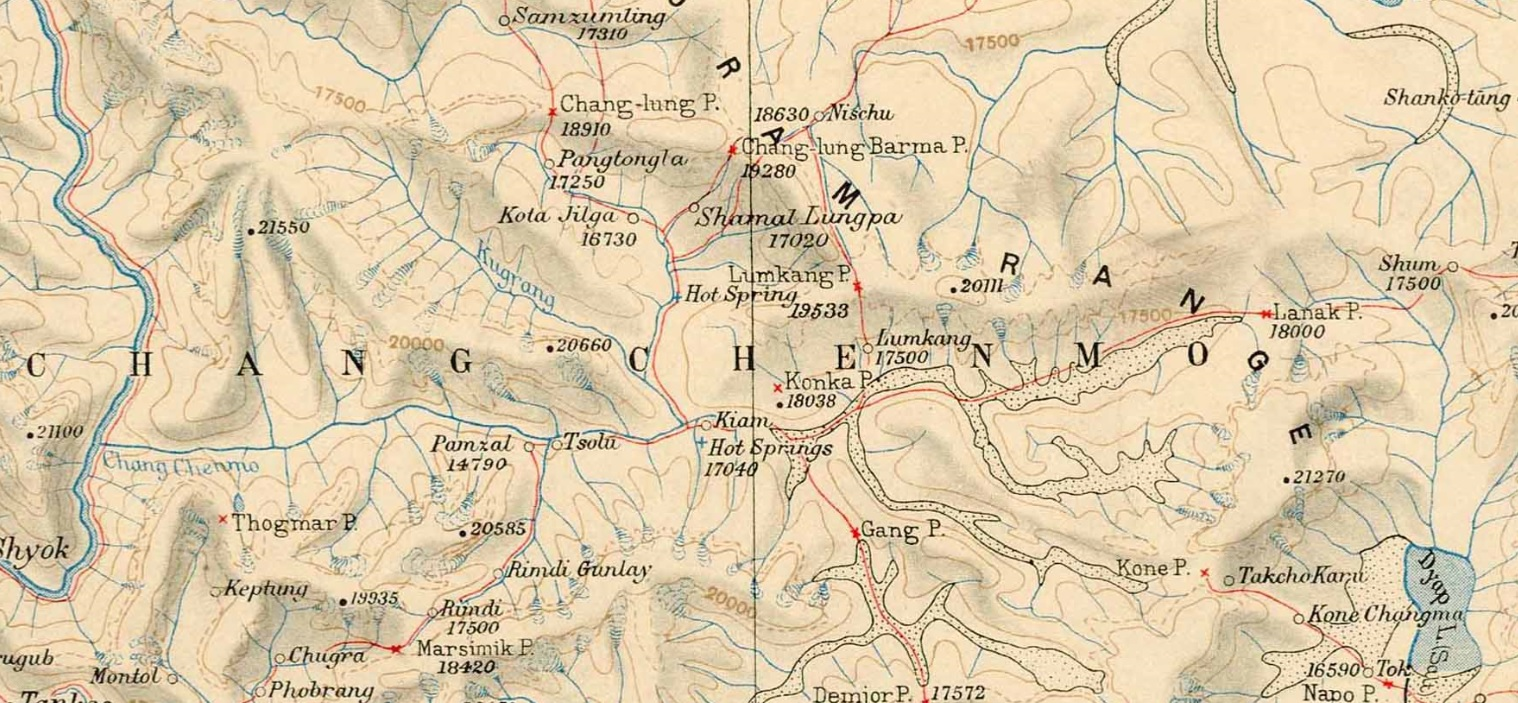
Changchenmo River Valley. The Changchenmo originates in east near Lanak La, flows in Chinese-held area till Konka La and thereafter in the Indian-held area via Tsogstsalu and Hot Springs to its confluence with Shyok River. on Darbuk–Shyok–DBO Road (DSDBO Road). Its tributary (Survey of India,1916)

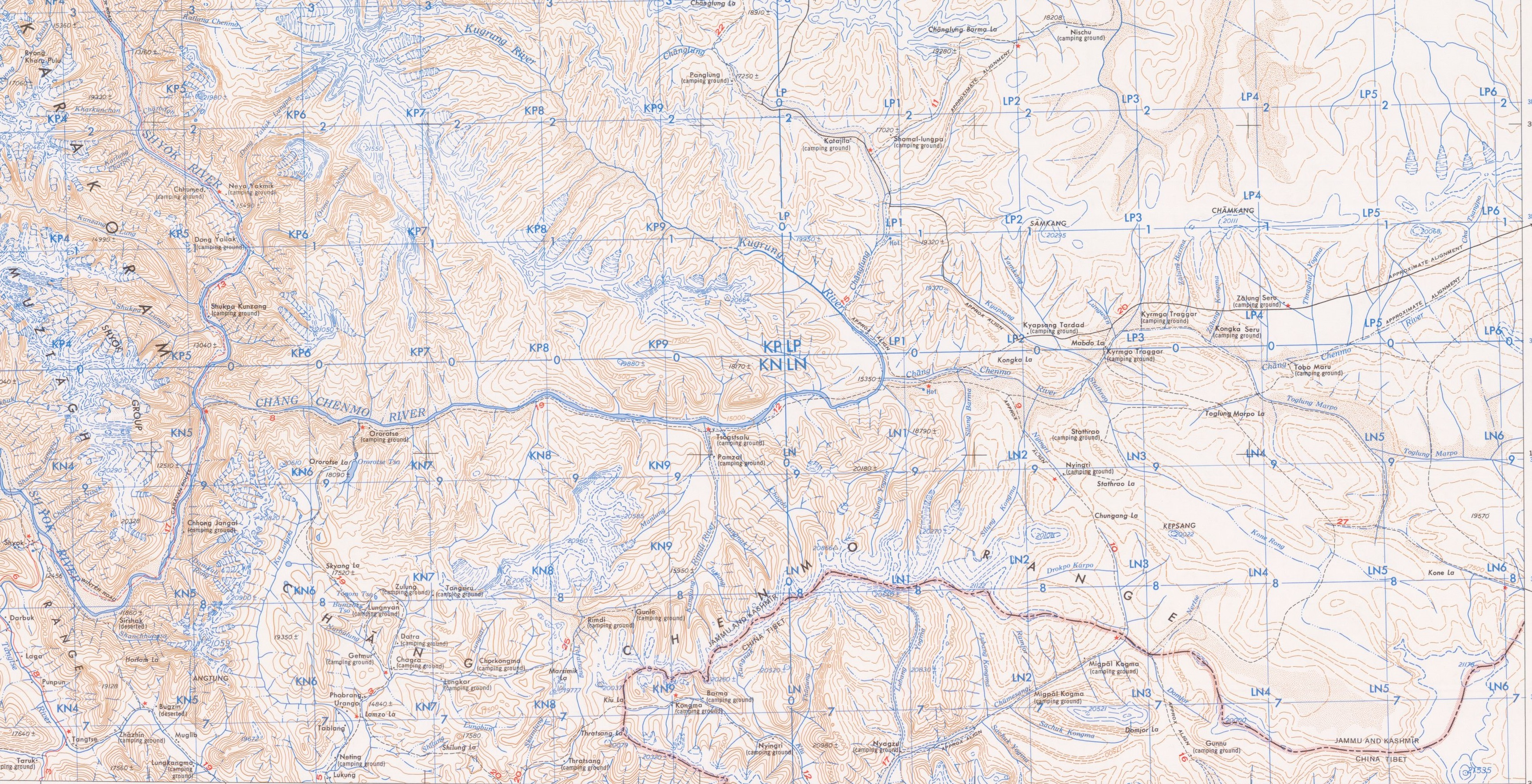
Changchenmo Valley in a US Army map of 1955

Chang Chenmo River
- Traditional Chinese: 羌臣摩河
- Simplified Chinese: 羌臣摩河
Transcriptions
Standard Mandarin
- Hanyu Pinyin: Qiāngchénmó hé

The Chang Chenmo Valley lies in a depression between the Karakoram Range in the north and the Changchenmo Range in the south. The depression continues into Tibet, all the way to Yeshil Kul (Bangda Co) and Lake Lighten (Guozha Co) on the Khotan border. The depression is now recognized as a geological fault called the Longmu Co fault, part of the larger Longmu–Guozha Co fault system.

The Chang Chenmo River has its origin in a glacier southwest of the Lanak Pass, which lies on a low ridge in the middle of the valley. The southern mountains are much more glaciated than the northern ones and possibly much of Changchenmo's waters are derived from them.

The Changchenmo flows on gravel bed for much of its course, described as "stony and bare". Numerous tributary streams flow into it from the north as well as the south, bringing alluvium. Grass grows in the alluvial beds, which is said to be used by the Ladakhis for autumn grazing. However, there is the ever-present danger of snowfall, which can cover up the grass. Unless the animals can be brought back over the high passes they would be in danger of starvation.

In the middle of the Changchenmo valley, a large spur of the Karakoram Range inserts itself, causing the river to zigzag its way through its hills. The Kongka Pass lies on the last of these hills. To the west of the spur, the large tributary of the Kugrang River flows into the river. To its east the Kyapsang River does the same. Three prominent grazing grounds are found to the west of the Kongka Pass, viz., Kyam (or Kiam, also called Hot Springs), Tsolu (or Tsogtsalu), and Pamzal. Another one called Gogra is to the northwest in the Kugrang River valley, where another tributary called Changlung flows into Kugrang.

After Pamzal, the river enters a narrow gorge through the main Karakoram Range, where it becomes a rapid stream. This part of the valley is not traversable except in winter when the river is frozen.

=== Tributaries ===
In Chinese-administered Aksai Chin, the Changchenmo is joined by Toglung Marpo, Kyapsang, and Silung Kongma.

It crosses the Line of Actual Control to Indian-administered Ladakh near the Kongka Pass. In Ladakh, it is joined by Silung Barma, Silung Yokma, Kugrang River, Rimdi River, and numerous other streams before flowing into the Shyok River.

=== Changchenmo Range ===
Changchenmo Range is the name given to the mass of mountains lying between the Chang Chenmo Valley and the Pangong Tso to the south. It has several glaciated spurs which slope down and jut into the northern bank of Pangong Tso, and these spurs are called the fingers. From west to east, these are named as the Finger-1 to Finger-8. According to the Britannica, the Changchenmo Range and Pangong Range are sometimes considered the easternmost part of the Karakoram Range. Prominent features in Changchenmo Range are the Marsimik La, eight "fingers", the Sirijap alluvial plain, Khurnak Plain, etc.

== History ==
In the late 1800s, in order to facilitate trade between the Indian subcontinent and Tarim Basin, the British attempted to promote a caravan route via the Chang Chenmo Valley as an alternative to the difficult and tariffed Karakoram Pass. The Maharaja Ranbir Singh at the request of the British made improvements to the trails and facilities of the campsites in Chang Chenmo Valley. Unfortunately, in addition of being longer and higher elevation than the traditional route, this route also goes through the desolate desert of Aksai Chin. By 1890s, traders have mostly given up on this route. At the time, Chang Chenmo valley was also a popular hunting spot for British officers on leave.

Since the 1950s, the river is in the disputed territory between China and India. As such, it hosts numerous border outposts from both sides, such as Kongka Pass, Hot Springs, and Tsogstsalu. The region was also the site of numerous tensions in the past, such as the 1959 Kongka Pass incident.

== Transport ==
"Changchenmo-Tsogtsalu Road" (CTR), 55 km long: India's BRO will complete the construction of the 55 km long road, from the confluence of Changchenmo & Shyok rivers to Tsogtsalu by December 2023 (August 2023 update), to connect the strategic Changchenmo sector. In October 2023, NHIDCL invited proposal to complete the "detailed project report" (DPR) to upgrade this road to a single-lane national highway with a 700-metre tunnel. The DPR must be completed in 10 months. The road will be upgraded as per the international standards including "highway design, pavement design, service roads wherever needed, type of intersections, rehabilitation and widening of existing and construction of new bridges and structures, road safety features, quantities of materials, cost estimates, and economic analysis".

"Phobrang-Marsimik La-Tsogtsalu-Hot Springs Road" (PMTHR) or "Marsimik La Road" (MLR): BRO is constructing this motorable black-topped road. It used to be a dirt track built earlier in 1983 under the supervision of Everester Sonam Paljore. Marsimik La in Chang-Chenmo Mountain Range is 20 km line of sight and 42 km driving distance northwest of the Pangong Tso, and 4 km south of LAC.

== Tourism ==
Since May 2023, India has opened the Changchenmo sector for the tourism, no Inner Line Permit (ILP) are needed, BRO is building various roads in this sector and police is setting up the tourist check post. Consequently, tourists will be able to travel up to Tsogatsalu and beyond to Hot Springs via Shyok River-Tsogatsalu-Hot Springs Road as well as via the road from Pangong Tso & 18,314-feet-high Marsimik La (pass) to Tsogtsalu pastureland near the confluence of Rimdi Chu and Chang Chenmo rivers. In the next phase tourists will be able to travel up to the Hot Springs and the Police Memorial. The Memorial was constructed to commemorate the sacrifice and martyrdom of ten CRPF soldiers killed on 21 October 1959 by the Chinese while they were on a patrol. "Chak Mandir" is a Hindu temple near the Marsimik La which tourist can visit.

== See also ==
- Geography of Ladakh
- Tourism in Ladakh
- India-China Border Roads

== Bibliography ==
- Gazetteer of Kashmir and Ladak, Calcutta: Superintendent of Government Printing, 1890
- Drew, Frederic (1875), The Jummoo and Kashmir Territories: A Geographical Account, E. Stanford – via archive.org
