= Manoj Joshi (journalist) =

Indian journalist and author

Manoj Joshi is an Indian journalist and author specialising in security and international relations. As of 2013 he is a Distinguished Fellow at the Observer Research Foundation, a New Delhi–based think tank. Before that he was a professional journalist whose previous job was as Comment Editor with the Mail Today newspaper in India.

== Education ==
Joshi finished his schooling from St. Joseph's College, Nainital. After an undergraduate degree at St. Stephen's College, Delhi, Joshi studied history at the University of Lucknow and earned his MPhil and PhD from the School of International Studies, Jawaharlal Nehru University.

== Career ==
Joshi was a Comment Editor with the Mail Today newspaper in India. and prior to that he has worked as the political editor of The Times of India. He has worked with India Today, The Hindu and was the Washington Correspondent of The Financial Express. Through his career, he has reported on the rise and fall of the militancy in Punjab, India's Sri Lanka venture in 1987, the conflict in the Siachen Glacier, India–Pakistan crises of 1987, 1990, 1999, 2002 and 2008–2009, on Sino-Indian relations and the growing ties between India and the United States and covered several general elections. He remained a member of India's National Security Council's advisory board, 2004–2006 In July 2011 he was appointed by the Government of India's Cabinet Committee on Security to be a member of a high level National Task Force chaired by former Cabinet Secretary Naresh Chandra. The 14-member task force was asked to examine India's security system and suggest ways of plugging the gaps, if any, and recommend reforms to make the system more efficient.

== Bibliography ==
- Combating Terrorism in Punjab: Indian Democracy in Crisis. Research Institute for the Study of Conflict and Terrorism, 1993
- Lost Rebellion, Kashmir in the Nineties. New Delhi, Penguin, 1999 ISBN 9780140278460
- Kashmir 1947–1965: A Story Retold. New Delhi, India Research Press, 2008 ISBN 9788187943525
- Understanding the India–China Border: The Enduring Threat of War in High Himalaya. London, C Hurst, 2022 ISBN 9781787385405
