= List of locations in Aksai Chin =

This is a list of basins, camping grounds, lakes, mountains, mountain passes, outposts, plains, rivers, ruins, settlements, streams, valleys, villages, and other geographical features located in (or partially included in) the sparsely populated Aksai Chin region administered by China but claimed by India. The alternate language names of locations in the Aksai Chin area are included for reference.

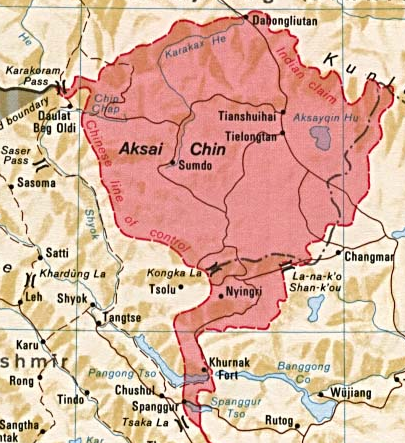
Approximate map of the Aksai Chin area

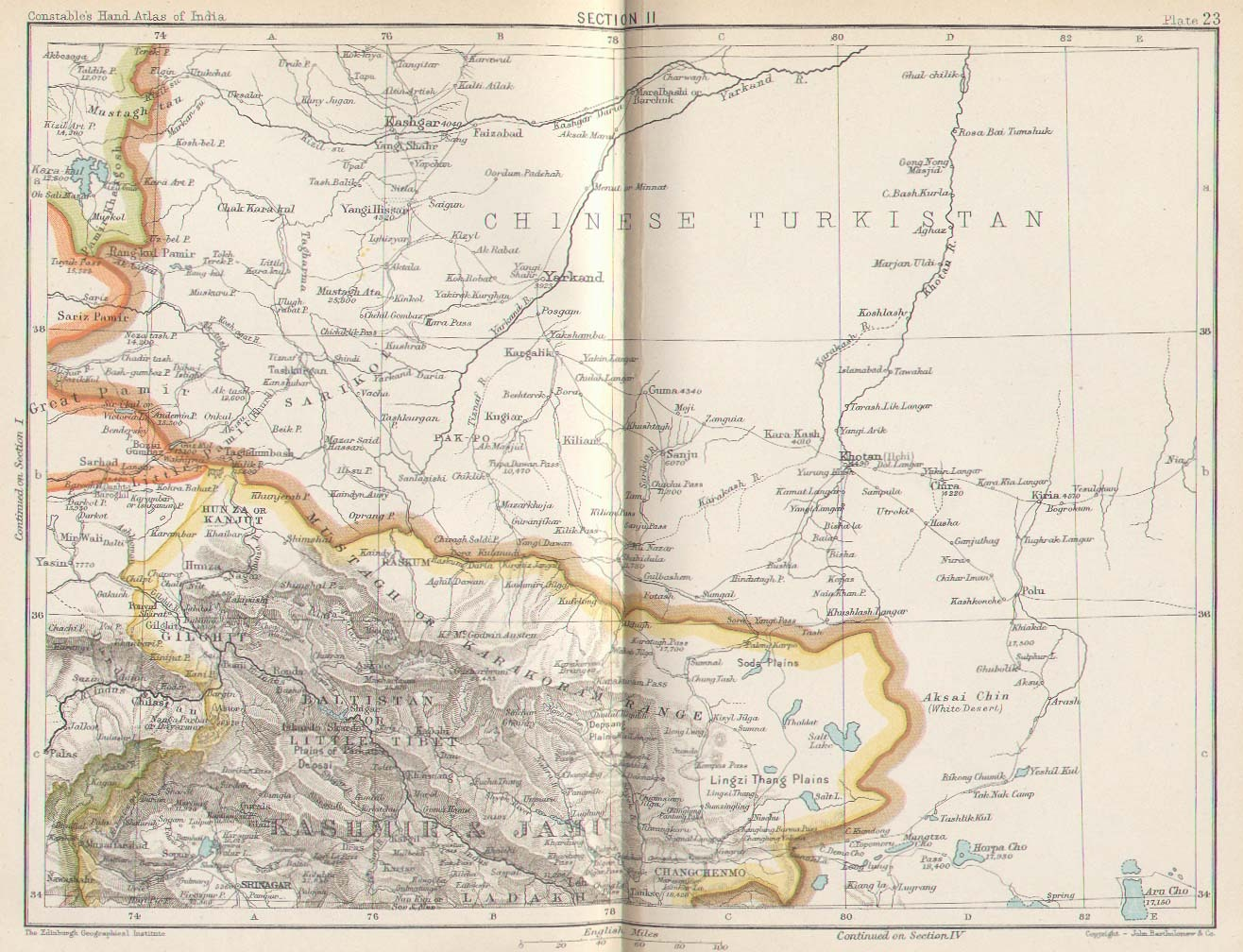
Map including part of Aksai Chin (1893)

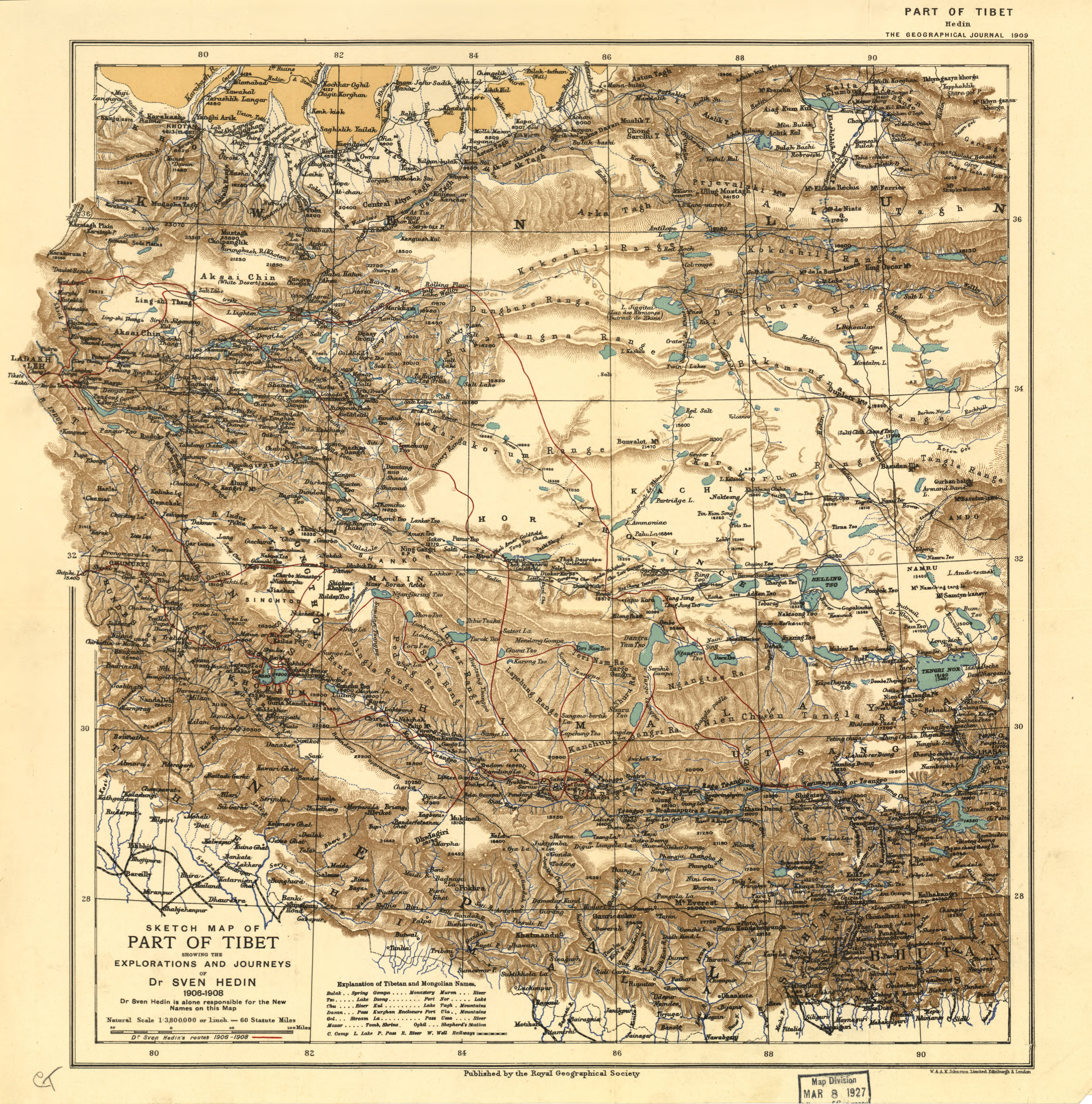
Map of the expeditions of Sven Hedin (1906–8) including Aksai Chin (RGS, early 20th century)

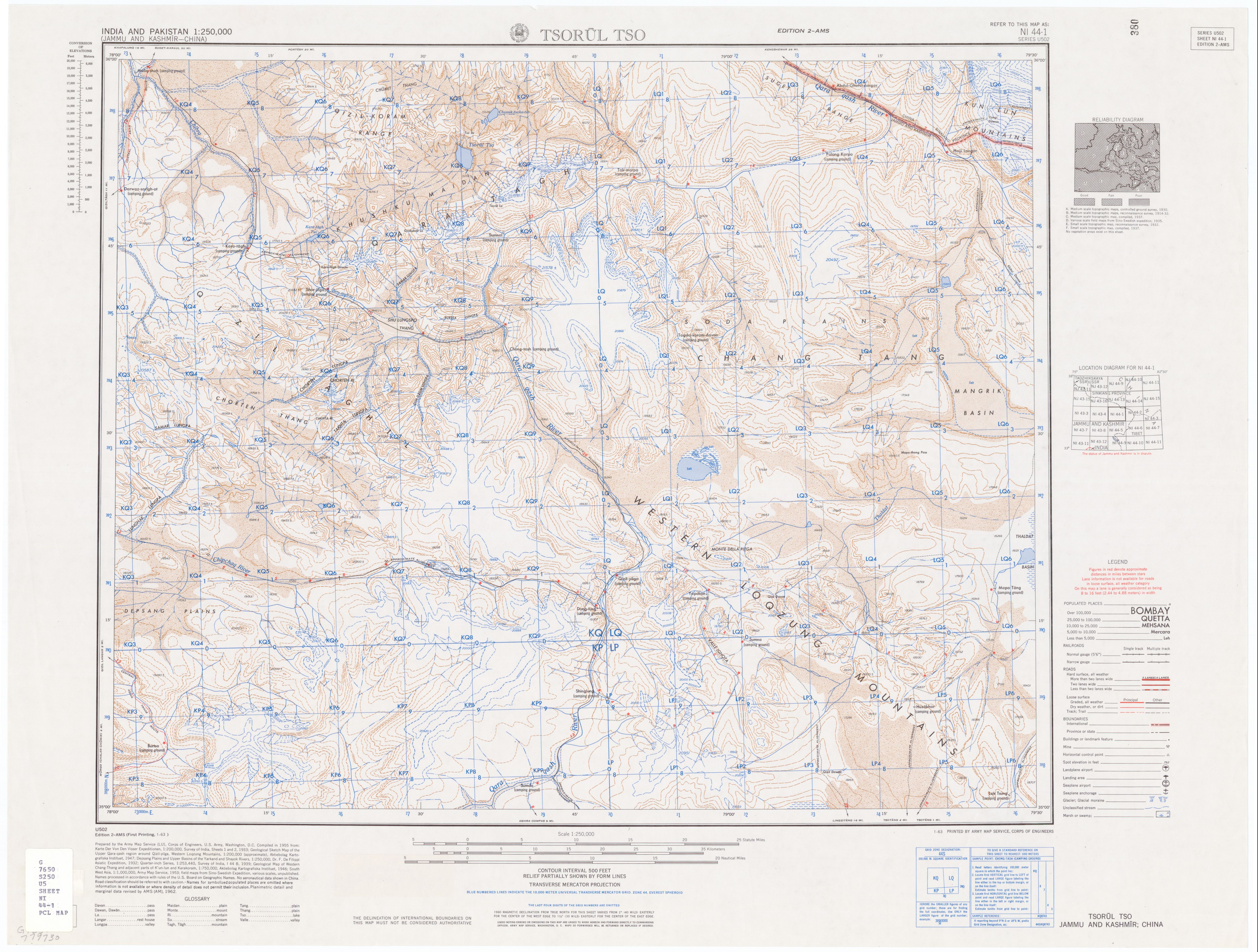
Map NI44-1 including part of Aksai Chin area (north) (AMS, 1955) (Note: From map: "THE DELINEATION OF INTERNATIONAL BOUNDARIES ON THIS MAP MUST NOT BE CONSIDERED AUTHORITATIVE")

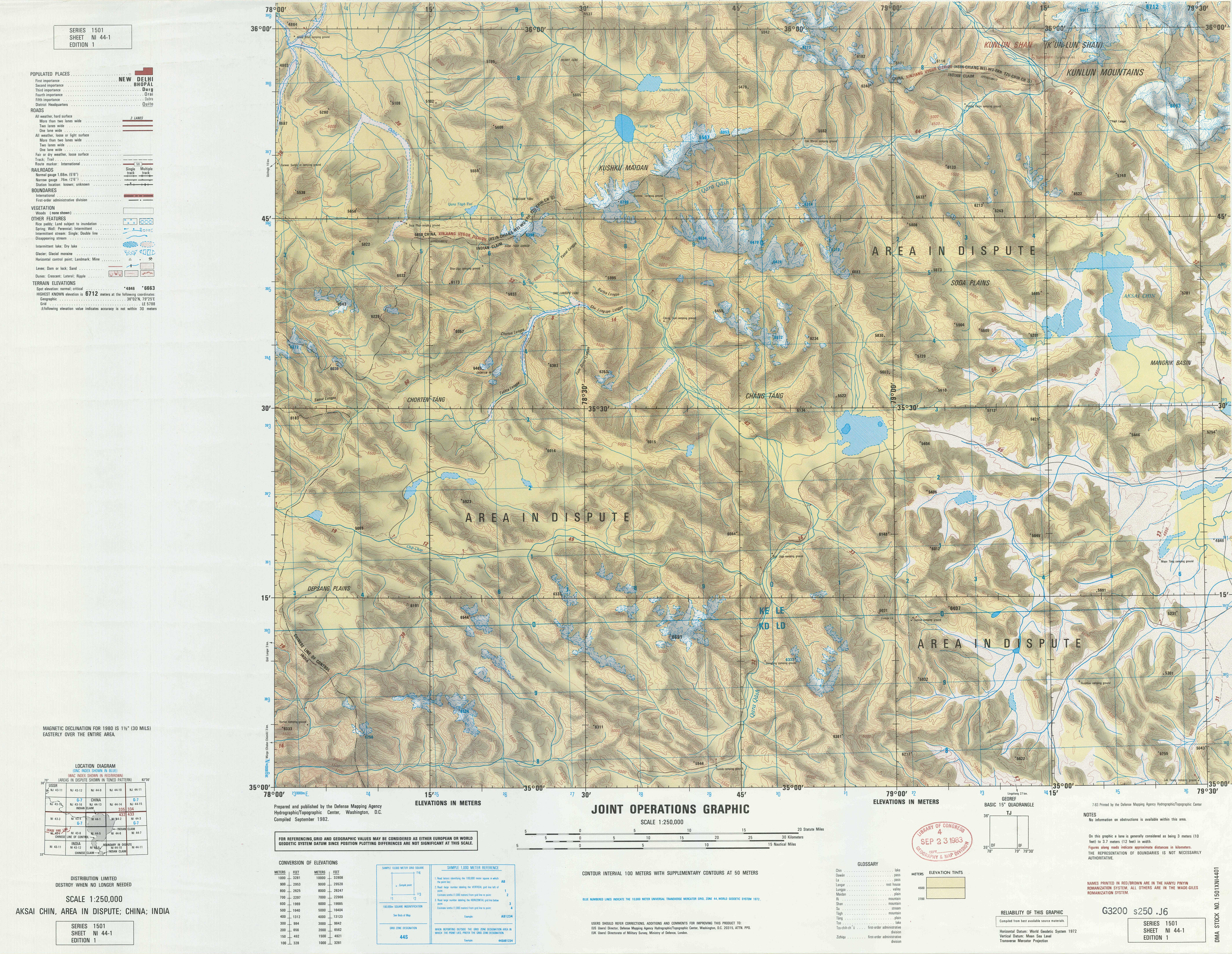
Map NI44-1 including part of Aksai Chin area (north) (DMA, 1982)

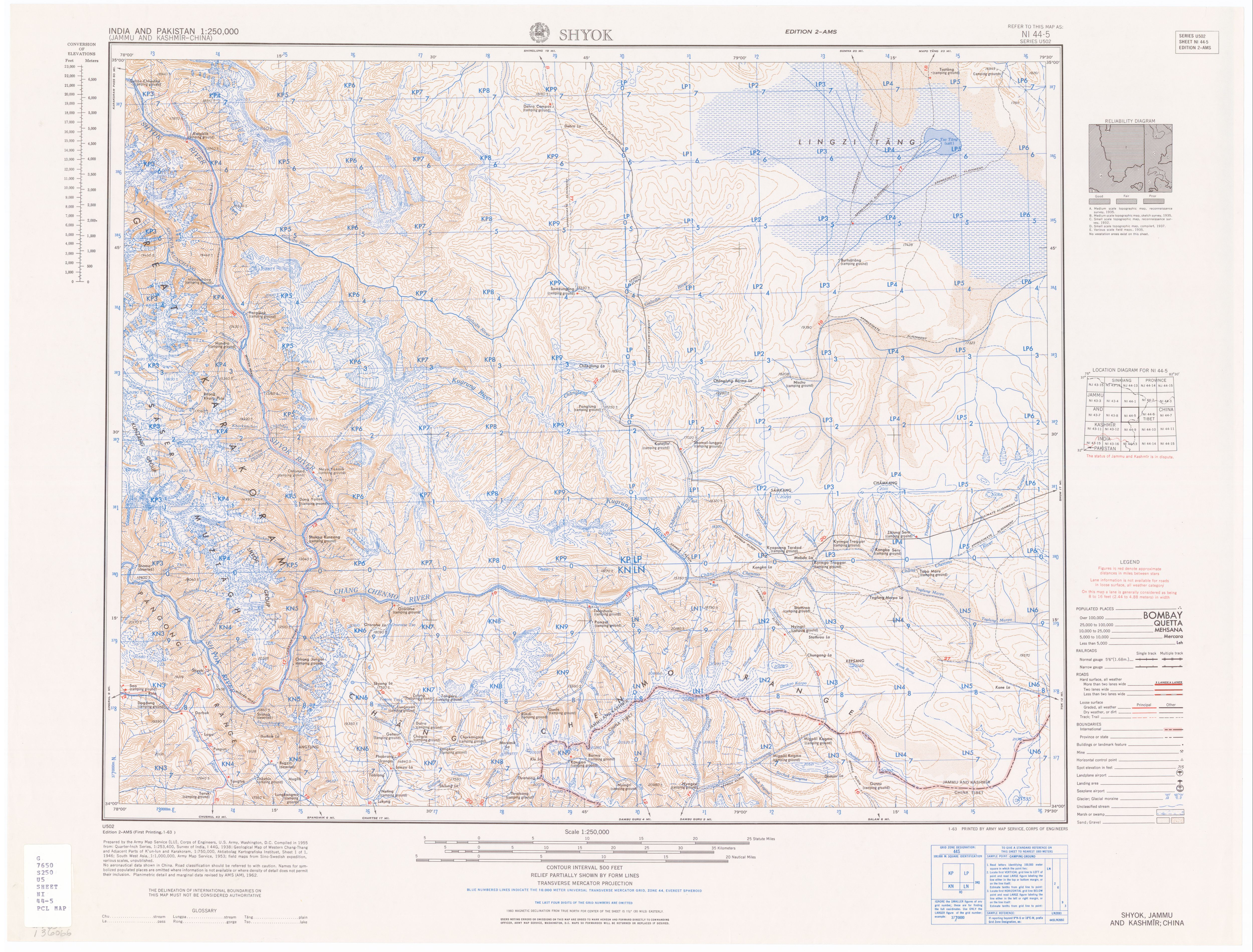
Map NI44-5 including part of the Aksai Chin area (central) (AMS, 1955)

Map NI44-5 including part of Aksai Chin labeled 'STATUS IN DISPUTE' (DIA, 1967)

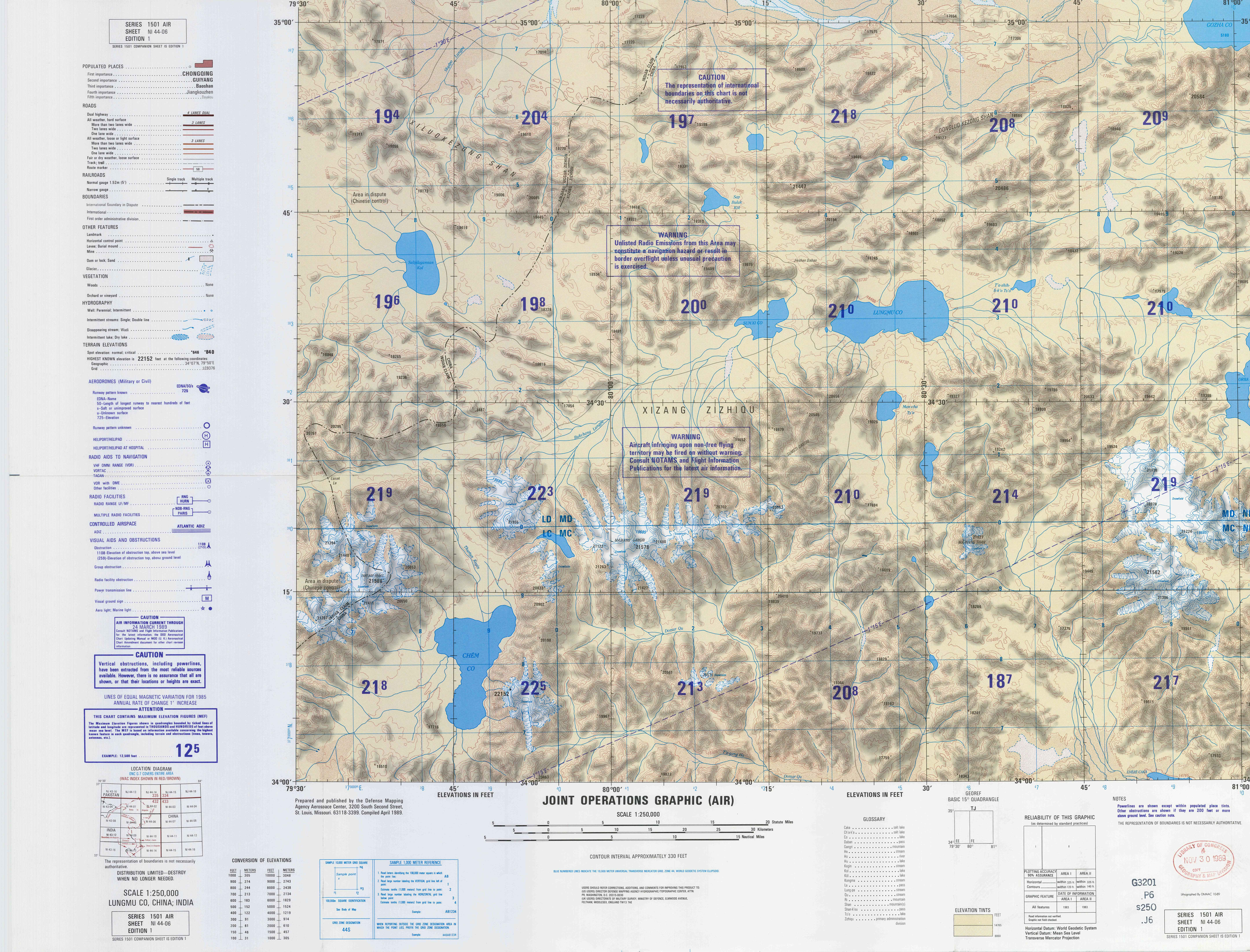
Map NI44-6 including part of Aksai Chin (DMA, 1989)

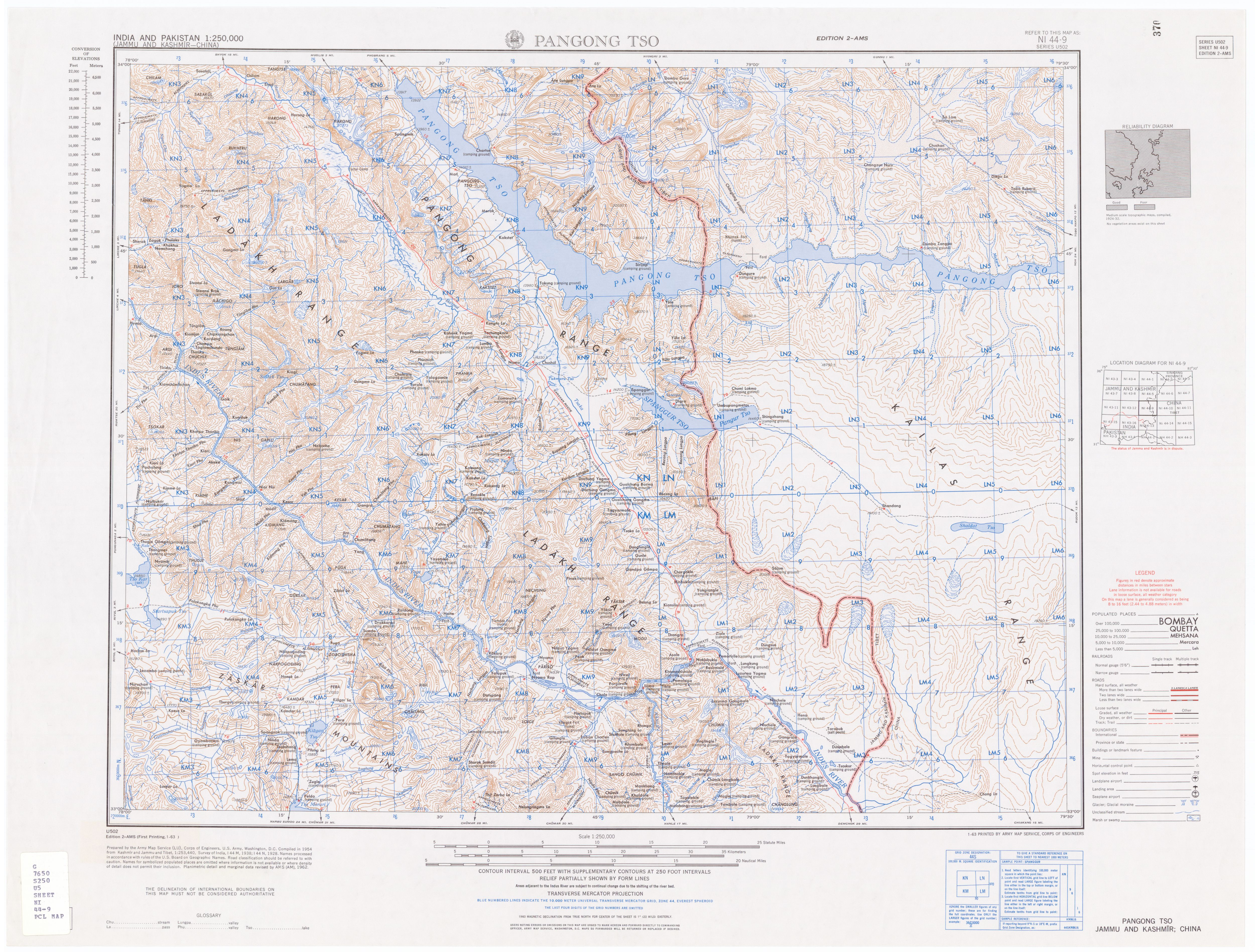
Map NI44-9 including part of the Aksai Chin area (south) (AMS, 1954)

Map NI44-9 including part of Aksai Chin (DMA, 1982)

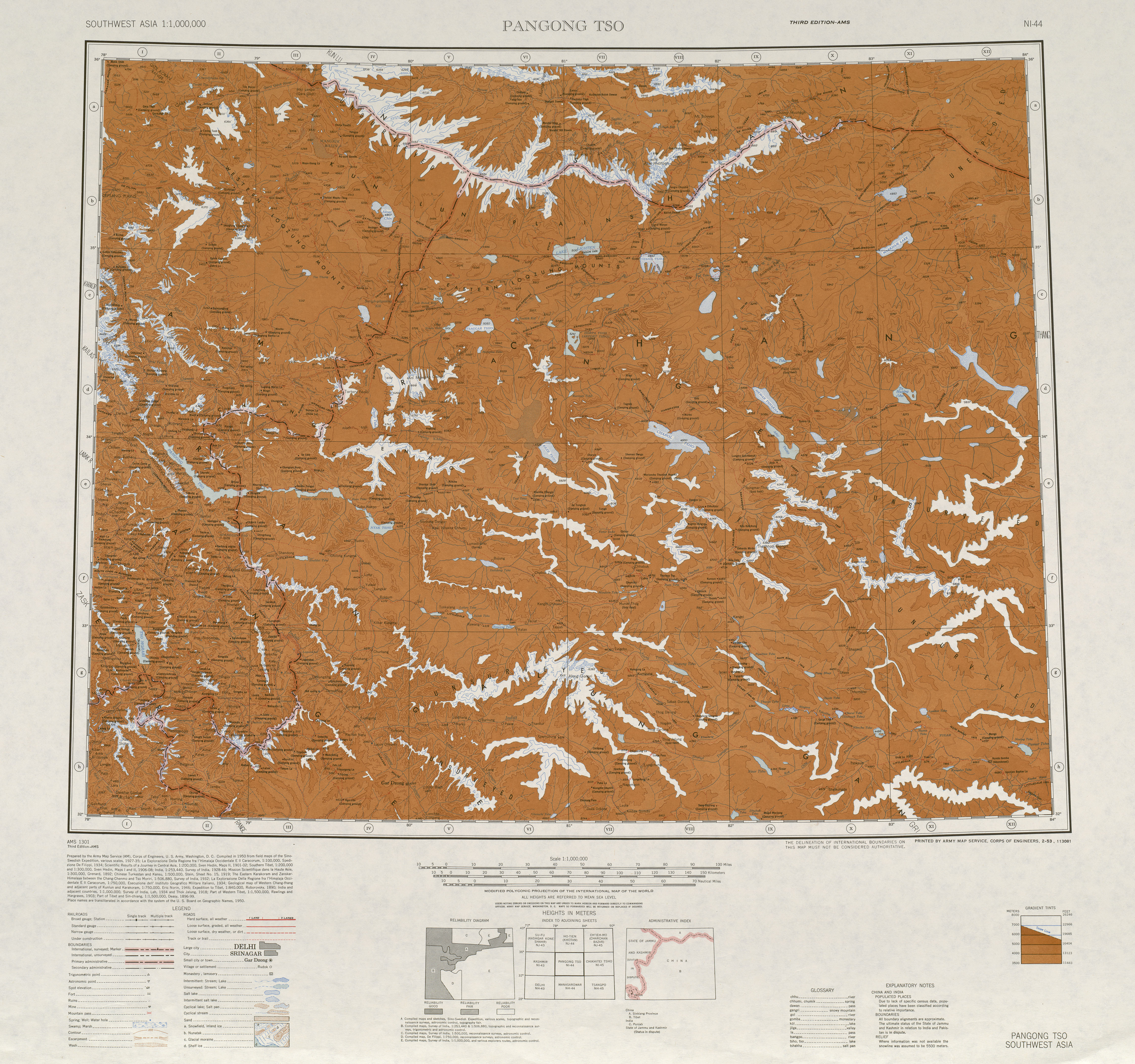
International Map of the World, Map NI44, 3rd edition including most of the Aksai Chin area (AMS, 1950)

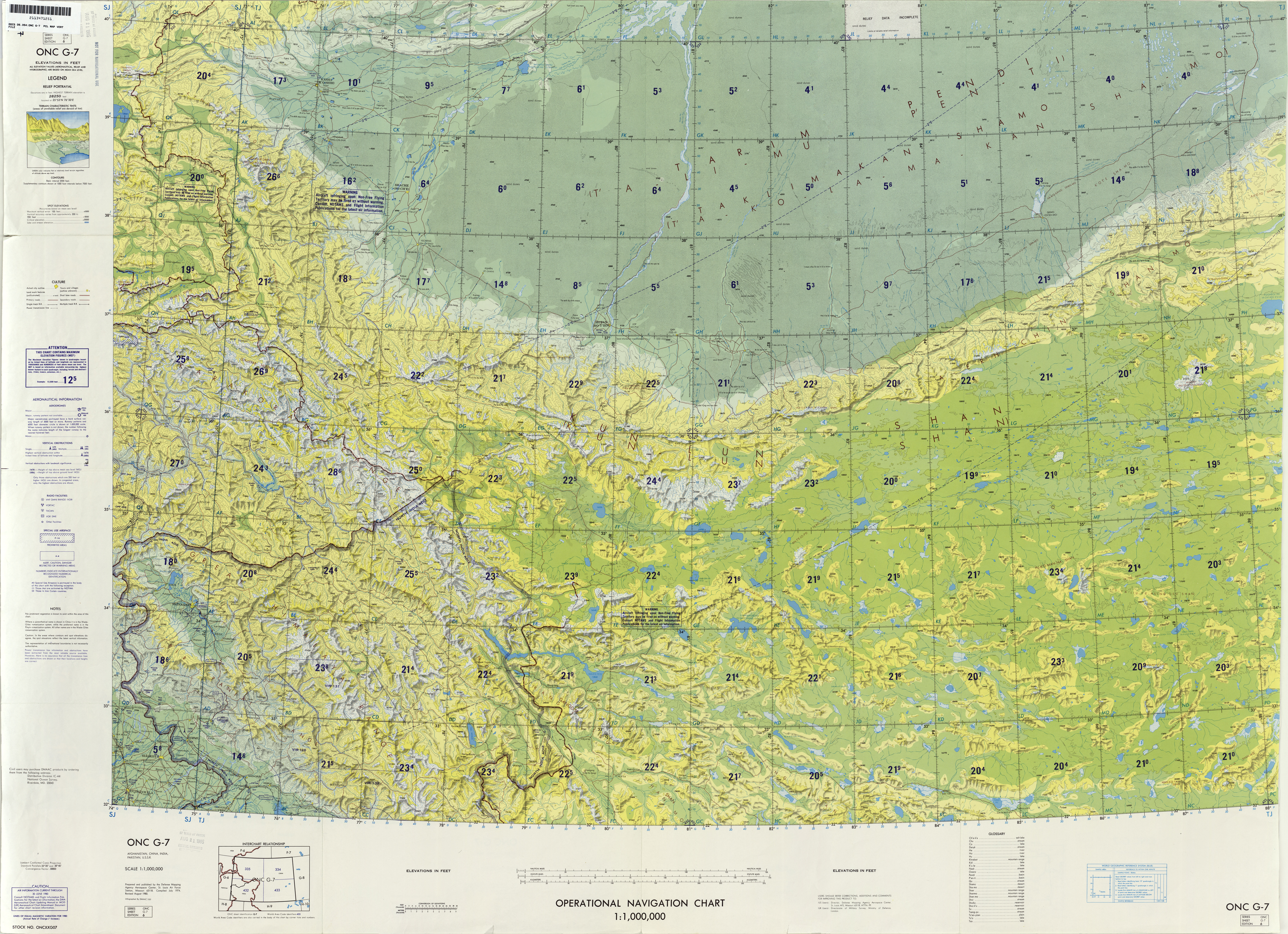
From the Operational Navigation Chart; map including all of the Aksai Chin area (DMA, 1980) (Note: From map: "The representation of international boundaries is not necessarily authoritative.")

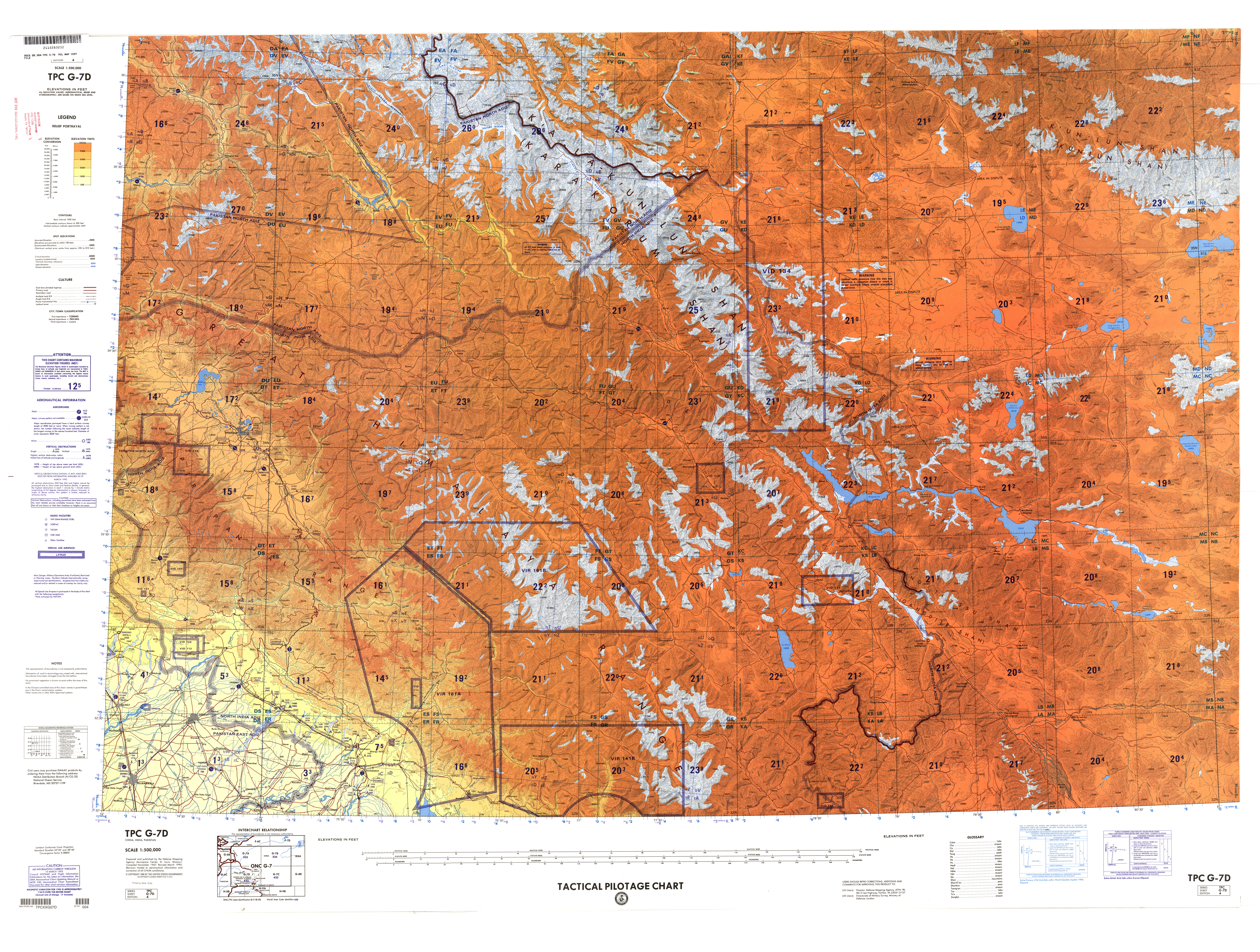
Map including all of the Aksai Chin area (DMA, 1995) (Note: From map: "The representation of boundaries is not necessarily authoritative.")

== Man-made ==
=== Settlements ===
Overview of settlements in Aksai Chin
Name	Purpose	In Use	Notes
Heweitan	Border outpost	Yes	
Huoshaoyun	Mining site	Yes	
Khurnak Fort	Ruins	Partial	Modern buildings nearby
Tianshuihai	Army service station	Yes	
Tianwendian	Border outpost	Yes	
Wenquan (outpost)	Border outpost	Yes	Also translated Hot Spring (温泉哨所). Not to be confused with the Indian border outpost at Hot Springs, Chang Chenmo Valley.

=== Highway features ===
Intersections and waysides

- Quanshuigou (泉水沟) – highway wayside
- Tielongtan (T’ieh-lung-t’an; 铁隆滩) – intersection with road to Wenquan
- Chalukou (岔路口; Fork) – Intersection of road to Tianwendian, Heweitan, and G219. It is possibly also a geology camp supporting nearby prospecting operations.

On some maps, the road intersections in the region are also referred to with the simple named "(blank)岔口" where "(blank)" is the Chinese initial of the destination, and 岔口 simply means "road fork". For example, 天岔口, 河岔口, and 空岔口 for the road forks to Tianwendian, Heweinan, and Kongka Pass respectively.

Highway maintenance squad

- No. 509 Highway Maintenance Squad - southeast of Dahongliutan few kilometers inside Indian claim
- No. 635 Highway Maintenance Squad – just north of Xinjiang Tibet provincial border

=== Camping grounds ===
Including camping grounds on historical caravan routes in Aksai Chin:

With improvements (modern & historical)

- Bilongtan – possibly geology camp for mining prospecting
- Dehra Compass (NI44-5, KP8)
- Hajji Langar (NI44-1, LQ5)/Haji Langar (哈吉栏干) (Qara Qāsh)
- Qizil-yilga or Qizil Jilga (NI44-1, LQ1) (克孜勒吉勒干 or 克孜勒吉勒尕)
  - Note: Chinese locations are slightly different, see Chalukou above. However, 克孜勒吉勒干 and 克孜勒吉勒尕 are used to signify 2 different valleys nearby.

Unimproved

These are simply referred to as halting place which are places with sufficient vegetation, water, or natural shelter to warrant stopping or camping for historical caravans that depended upon beasts of burden.

- Amtogor (NI44) 35°03′12″N 079°49′03″E
- Burtsātāng (NI44-5, LP3)
- Chong-tash (NI44-1, KQ8)
- Dambu Guru / Tang-pu-ku-lu (NI44-9, LN0)
- Digra (NI44-9, LN0)
- Dong-lung (NI44-1, KQ9) (羌隆山口; referred to as a mountain pass in Chinese)
- Dungure (NI44-9, LN1)
- Gunnu / Kun-nu (NI44-5, LN3)
- Huzākhar (NI44-1, LP4) 35°08′12″N 079°18′34″E
- Kongka Seru (NI44-5, LP3)
- Kota Jilga (NI44-5, KP0) (科塔)
- Kyapsang Tardad (NI44-5, LP2)
- Kyrmgo Traggar/Kyrmgō Traggar (NI44-5, LP3)
- Lak Tsung (NI44-1, LP5)
- Mapo Tāng (NI44-1, LQ5)
- Migpāl Kogma (NI44-5, LN2)
- Nischu (NI44-5, LP2) (尼斯楚)
- Nyagzu (NI44-5, LN1) (Chinese: 尼亚格祖; pinyin: Ní yǎ gé zǔ)
- Nyingri (NI44-5, LN2)
- Palong Karpo (NI44-1, LQ3)
- Panglung (NI44-5, KP9) (班隆)
- Samzungling (NI44-5, KP9) (萨木崇岭)
- Shinglung (NI44-1, KP9)
- Shor-jilga (NI44-1, KQ5)
- Sirijap (NI44-9, KN9)
- Stathrao (NI44-5, LN2)
- Sumdo (NI44-1, KP8) 35°04′57″N 078°44′44″E
- Sumna (NI44-1, LQ2)
- Sumnal (NI44-1, KQ8)
- Tagda-koram-davan (NI44-1, LQ1)
- Tak-marpo (NI44-1, LQ0)
- Thaldat Mapho Tāng (NI44) In October 1963, a radar site 6 nmi (11 km) northeast of Thaldat Mapho Tāng included a radar antenna, seven tents and three support buildings.
- Tsotāng (NI44-5, LP4)
- Yangpa (NI44)
- Yapchan (NI44-1, LQ1)
- Yūla (NI44-9, LN0)
- Zālung Seru (NI44-5, LP4)

== Topographical features ==
=== Plains and basins ===
- Chang Tang (NI44-1, LQ1)
- Chorten Tang (NI44-1, KQ4)
- Depsang Plains
- Lingzi Tāng (Lingzhithang, Lingzhithāng Plains, Ling-shi-tang) (NI44-5, LP2) (林格季唐凹地; 林济塘洼地) 34°49′14″N 079°18′00″E, 34°46′59″N 079°10′37″E
- Mangrik Basin (NI44-1, LQ5) (肖尔克谷地; Xiaoerke Valley; different name)
- Shu Lungspo Thang (NI44-1, KQ6) (楚隆斯帕坦)
- Thaldat basin (NI44-1, LQ6)

=== Mountain passes ===
'Dawan' and 'La' refer to a mountain pass.

- Āne La (NI44-9, KN9) (Chinese: 爱尼山口; pinyin: Ài ní shānkǒu)
- Aq-qum Dawān (NI44)
- Chānglung Barma La (NI44-5, LP1)
- Chānglung La (NI44-5, KP9)
- Kyungang La/Chungang La (NI44-5, LN2) (Chinese: 君岗达坂; pinyin: Jūn gǎng dá bǎn)
- Dehra La (NI44-5, KP9)
- Domjor La (NI44-5, LN2)
- Kara-tāgh Dawān (NI44-1, KQ6)
- Khitai Davan (NI44-1, KQ6)/Khitai Dawān/Khitai Dawan (奇台达坂)
- Kiu La (NI44-5, KN9) (Chinese: 基乌拉山口; pinyin: Jī wū lā shānkǒu)
- Kone La (NI44-5, LN5)/Domjar La
- Kongka Pass (NI44-5, LN2)
- Konka La (NI44) (科尼山口)
- Lanak La (NI44-6)
- Mabdo La/Mobdo La (NI44-5, LP2)
- Mapo-thang Pass (NI44-1, LQ4)/Mapo-thang La
- Qisil Davan (NI44-1, LQ2)
- Qizil Dawan (NI44-1, LP3)
- Rezang La (NI44-9, LN0)
- Spanggur Gap (NI44-9, KN9)
- Stathrao La (NI44-5, LN2)
- Toglung Marpo La (NI44-5, LN3) 34°17′04″N 079°11′55″E
- Yūla La (NI44-9, LN0)

=== Lakes ===
- Aksai Chin Lake
- Bilongtan
- Pangong Tso
- Spanggur Tso (NI44-9, LN0)
- Surigh Yilganing Kol (Surigh-yilganing Köl; 萨利吉勒干南库勒湖) (NI44-6)
- Tianshuihai
- Tso Tang (NI44-5, LP4)/Tso Thang (到腾格湖)

=== Mountains ===
- Chāng Chenmo Range (NI44-1, KN6)
- Chorten-ri (NI44-1, KQ6)
- Kunlun Mountains
- Monte Della Piega (NI44-1, LQ1)
- Qara-tagh (NI44-1, KQ7)
- Takhta-ri (NI44-1, KQ5)
- Western Loqzung Mountains (NI44-1, LQ0)
- Xiluokezong Shan (NI44-6, about 34°50'N, 79°45'E)

=== Rivers and streams ===
- Ang (NI44-9, LN1)
- Ān Zurma / Ānsurma (NI44-9, LN0)
- Chang Chenmo River (Chinese: 羌臣摩河; pinyin: Qiāng chén mó hé)
- Chānglung (NI44-5, KP9 & LP0)
- Chūmesang (NI44-5, LN1)
- Drokpo Karpo (NI44-5, LN2)
- Galwan River (NI44-5, LP0)
- Karakash River (Qara Qāsh River)
- Kiu (NI44-9, LN0)
- Kugrung River (NI44-5, KP9)
- Kyapsang (NI44-5, LP1) (Chinese: 应基隆河; pinyin: Yīng jīlóng hé; different name possibly from Tibetan)
- Lubang Kongma (NI44-5, LN1)
- Lubang Yogma (NI44-5, LN1)
- Nertse (NI44-5, LN3)
- Omalung (NI44-9, LN1)
- Pangsher (NI44-9, LN1)
- Qara-tagh-su (NI44-1, KQ6)
- Ramjor (NI44-5, LN1)
- Sachuk Kongma (NI44-5, LN2)
- Silung Barma (NI44-5, LN1) (Chinese: 西隆格巴尔玛河; pinyin: Xī lóng gé bā'ěr mǎ hé)
- Silung Kongma (NI44-5, LN1) (Chinese: 西隆格康格玛河; pinyin: Xī lóng gé kāng gé mǎ hé)
- Skyangzum (NI44-9, LN0)
- Stathrao (NI44-5, LN3)
- Surlah (NI44-9, LN0)
- Thaldat (NI44-1, LQ4)
- Toglung Marpo (NI44-5, LN4)

=== Valleys and gorges ===
'Lungpa' refers to a valley or stream

- Burtsa Lungpa (NI44-1, KQ7)
- Chānglung Lungpa (NI44-9, LN1), also called Chang Parma or Chang Barma
- Chorten Lungpa (NI44-1, KQ5)
- Kone Rong (NI44-5, LN4)
- Lungnak Lungpa (NI44-1, KQ3)
- Migpal Lungpa (Chumesang valley, NI 44-5, LN2)
- Pilung Lungpa (NI44-9, KN9)
- Rezang Lungpa (NI44-9, LN0)
- Samar Lungpa (NI44-1, KQ3)
- Shamal Lungpa (NI44-5, LP1)
- Skydpo Lungpa (NI44-6, just below 35°00'N, 79°45'E)
- Sum-dzom Lungpa (NI44-1, KQ7)
- Takhta Lungpa (NI44-1, KQ6)
- Valle Ignota (NI44-1, LQ1)
- Yamar Lungpa (NI44-1, KQ7)
- Yūla Lungpa (NI44-9, LN0)

== See also ==
- Depsang Bulge
- Depsang Plains
- Geography of Ladakh
- India-China border infrastructure
- India–China Border Roads
