= Lanak La =

- ལ་ནག་ལ
- Location within Tibet Location within Ladakh
- Elevation: 5,466 m (17,933 ft)
- Traversed by: Tibet Provincial Road S519

Location
- Location: Tibet, China
- Coordinates: 34°23′38″N 79°32′21″E

Lanak La

Chinese name
- Chinese: 拉那克山口
Transcriptions
Standard Mandarin
- Hanyu Pinyin: Lānàkè Shānkǒu

Tibetan name
- Tibetan: ལ་ནག་ལ
Transcriptions
- Wylie: lanag la
- THL: lanak la
- Tibetan Pinyin: lanag la

Lanak La (Tibetan: ལ་ནག་ལ) or Lanak Pass (Chinese: 拉那克山口; Hindi: लानक दर्रा) is a mountain pass in the disputed Aksai Chin region, administered by China as part of the Tibet Autonomous Region. It is claimed by India as its border pass.

== History ==
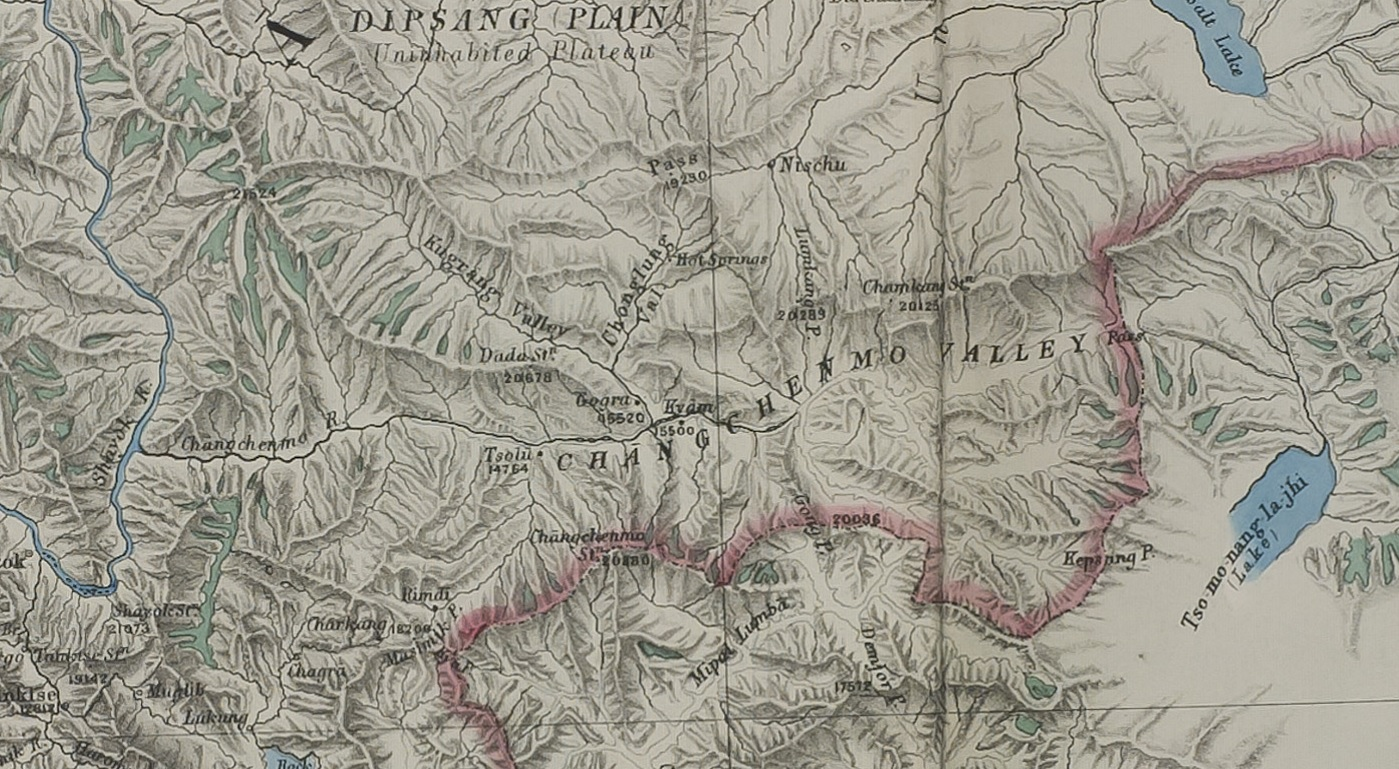
The Changchenmo Valley depicted by Frederic Drew, 1875. Lanak Pass labelled as simply "Pass" at the eastern end of the valley, through which the border passed.

Lanak La had been a well-established frontier point between Ladakh and Tibet, as confirmed by travellers from William Moorcroft in 1820 onwards. Several travellers wrote in the late 19th and early 20th centuries that the traditional boundary between India and Tibet was at Lanak La. They also state that the border was accepted by both sides.

There are substantial Kashmiri Government records for the area of the Chang Chenmo valley up to the Lanak pass. In addition to the revenue records, 1908 Ladakh Settlement Report, reports of several survey teams, the Jammu and Kashmir Game Preservation Act of 1951, there are Kashmiri documents relating to the construction and maintenance of trade routes, rest houses, and storehouses in the Chang Chenmo valley. All of them placed the entire valley up to the Lanak Pass within Ladakh.

== Chinese claims ==
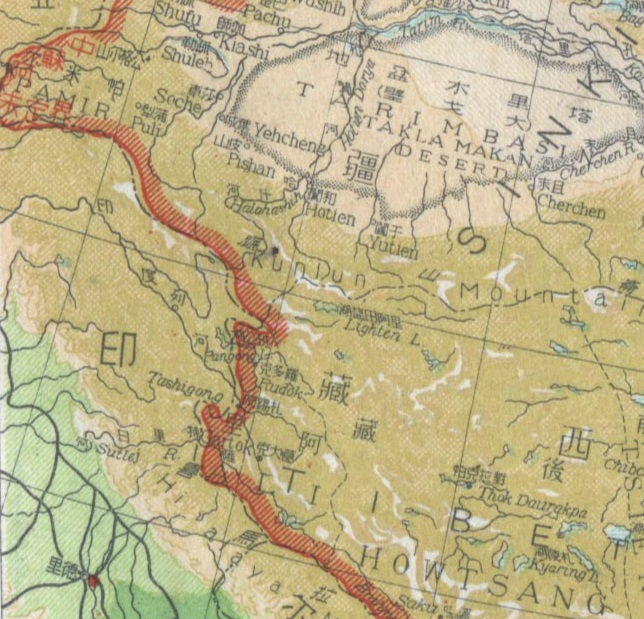
1947 map of the Republic of China showing the Lanak La boundary

Chinese maps also recognised Lanak La as the boundary till 1951.

In 1956, the People's Republic of China published what appears to be its first self-defined map, in which Kongka Pass was marked as the boundary.

There was no Chinese presence in the area of Lanak La till June 1958, when an Indian patrol party had gone up to it along the Changchenmo Valley. There was an Indian flag planted there until 1956.

In 1959, Chinese troops had infiltrated into the Changchenmo Valley. In October that year, as an Indian border patrol party was attempting to set up posts in the vicinity of the Kongka Pass, they were ambushed by Chinese troops, killing some of them and taking others prisoner.

Some western scholars such as Larry Wortzel and Allen S. Whiting appear to endorse the Chinese claim that Kongka Pass was the "traditional" boundary of Tibet. Other scholars however point out the Chinese inconsistencies.

== Historical maps ==
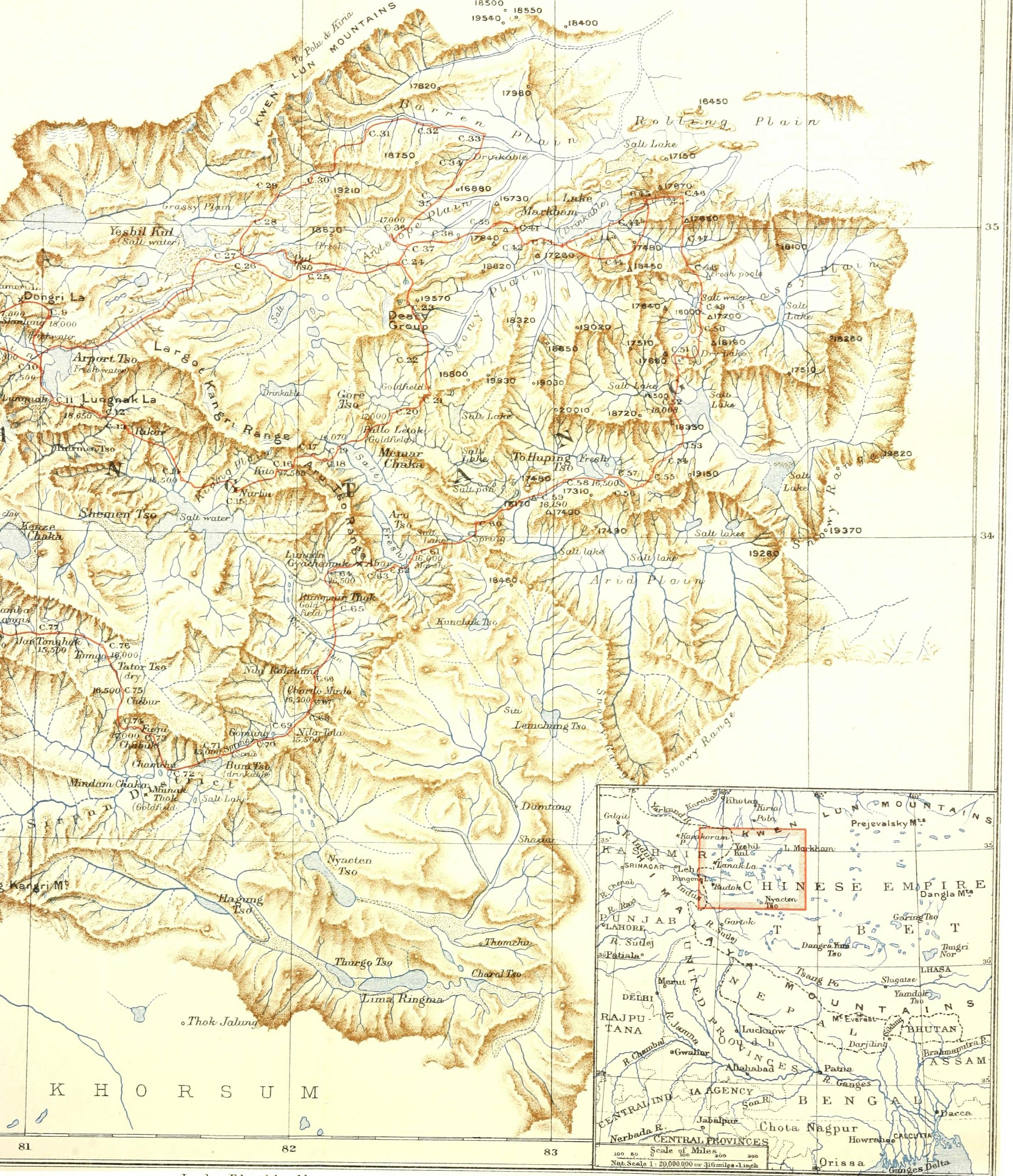
Map by Cecil Rawling, showing Lanak La on the boundary in inset map (1905)

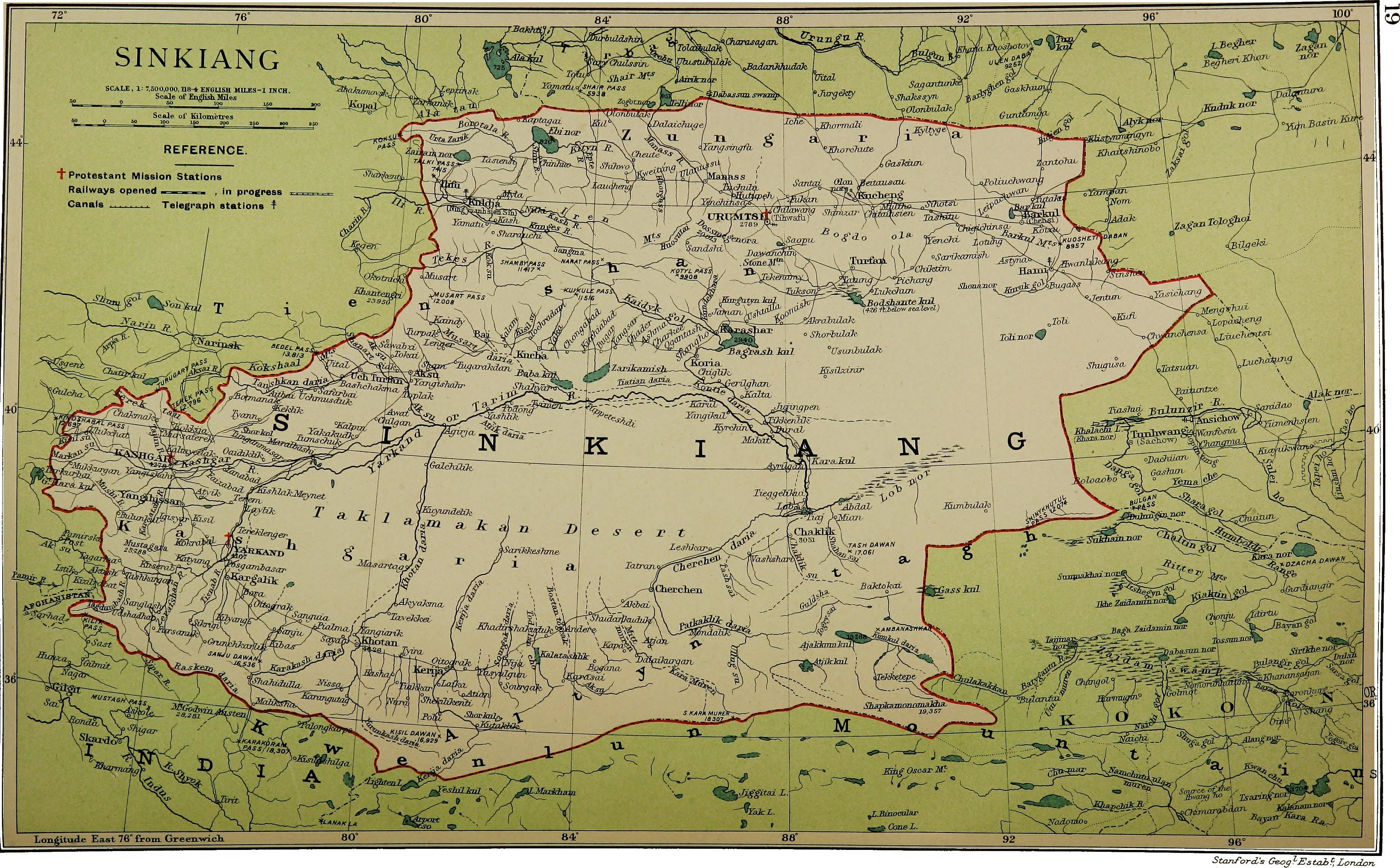
Map including Lanak La (Stanford, 1917)

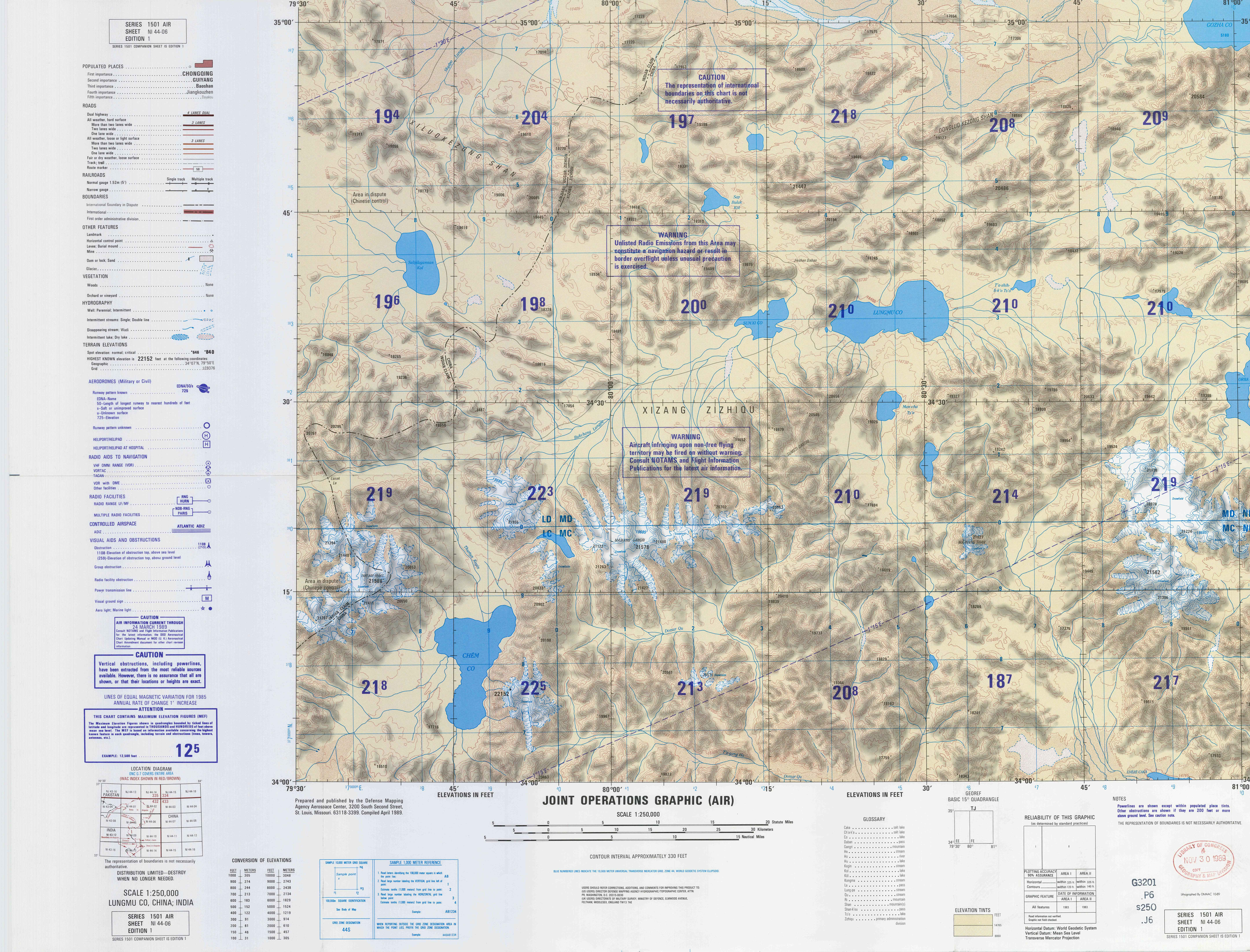
Map including Lanak La (DMA, 1989)

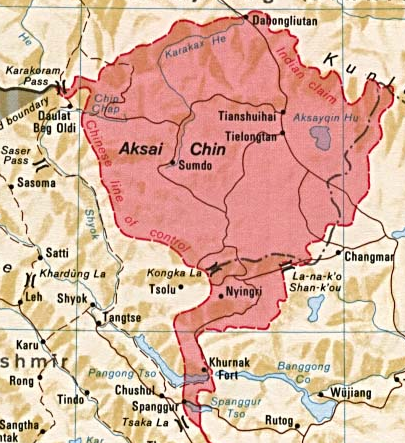
Map including Lanak La (labeled as La-na-k'o Shan-k'ou, CIA, 2013)

== See also ==
- List of locations in Aksai Chin

== Bibliography ==
- Fisher, Margaret W.; Rose, Leo E.; Huttenback, Robert A. (1963), Himalayan Battleground: Sino-Indian Rivalry in Ladakh, Praeger – via archive.org
- Hoffmann, Steven A. (1 January 1990). India and the China Crisis. University of California Press. ISBN 978-0-520-06537-6.
