= Dehra Compass =

- Location within Southern Xinjiang
- Interactive map of Dehra Compass
- Elevation: 5,450 metres (17,880 ft)

Third Approach
- Location: Xinjiang, China
- Coordinates: 34°55′41″N 78°41′32″E

Dehra Compass or Dehra Kompas (迪拉村) is the location of a historical caravan campsite in Aksai Chin. It is under Chinese control and claimed by India. Historically, the camp was used by caravans journeying between the Indian subcontinent and Tarim Basin. It was traversed by European explorers during the 1800s. At one point, there were stone shelters constructed at this location to facilitate camping.

== Etymology ==
'Dehra' is derived from the Punjabi and Seraiki language word 'dera', meaning camp, while 'Compass' comes from the name of a survey officer, Kompas Walla.

== Sino-Indian border dispute ==
In the events leading to the Sino-Indian War, Indian patrols used Kompas La and Dehra Compass to monitor the area. Chinese troops gained control of this area after May 1961.

== Kompas La ==
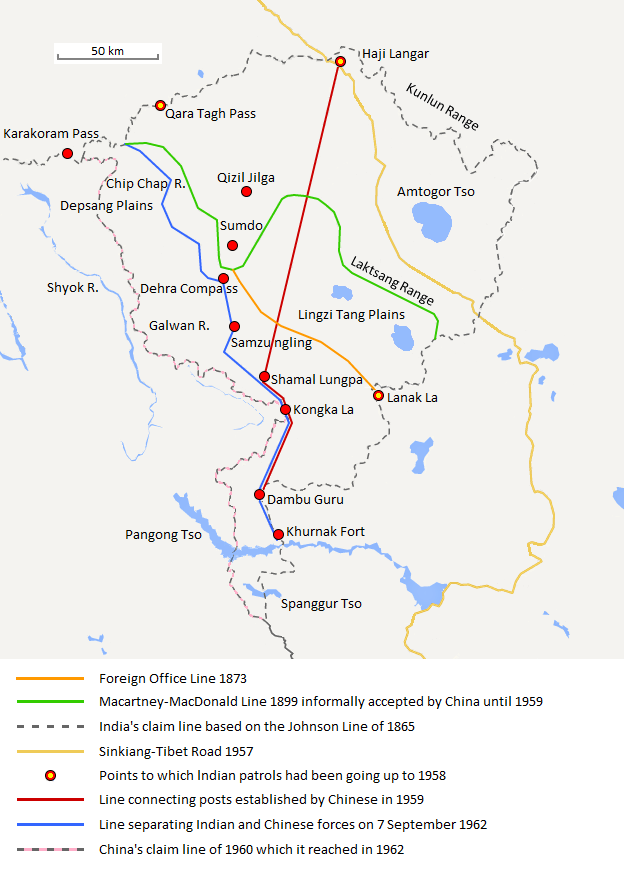
Map including Dehra Compass

Kompas La or Dehra La (Chinese: 迪拉山口) is the pass through a nearby mountain spur. Historically the pass was to the south reached an elevation of 18,160 feet (5,540 m). Present day, the vehicle accessible gravel road routed to the east, while still one of the highest in the world, only reaches elevation of 5,476 metres (17,966 ft), serving the Chinese border outpost of Heweitan to the west.

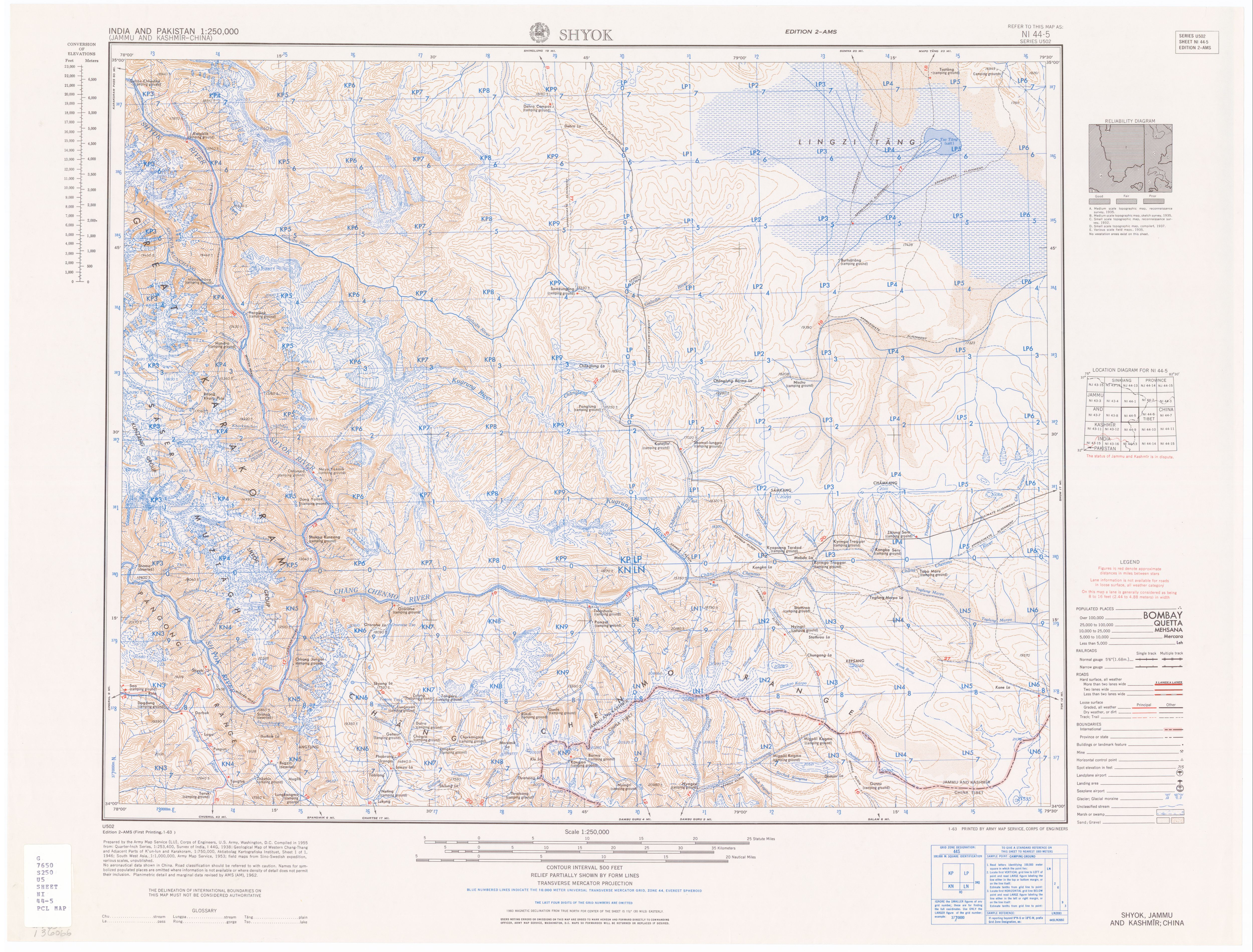
Map including Dehra Compas (camping ground) (AMS, 1955) (Note: From map: "THE DELINEATION OF INTERNATIONAL BOUNDARIES ON THIS MAP MUST NOT BE CONSIDERED AUTHORITATIVE")

Map including Dehra Compas Camping Ground (DIA, 1967)

== See also ==
- List of locations in Aksai Chin
