= Hekang County =

Hekang County 和康县
- County
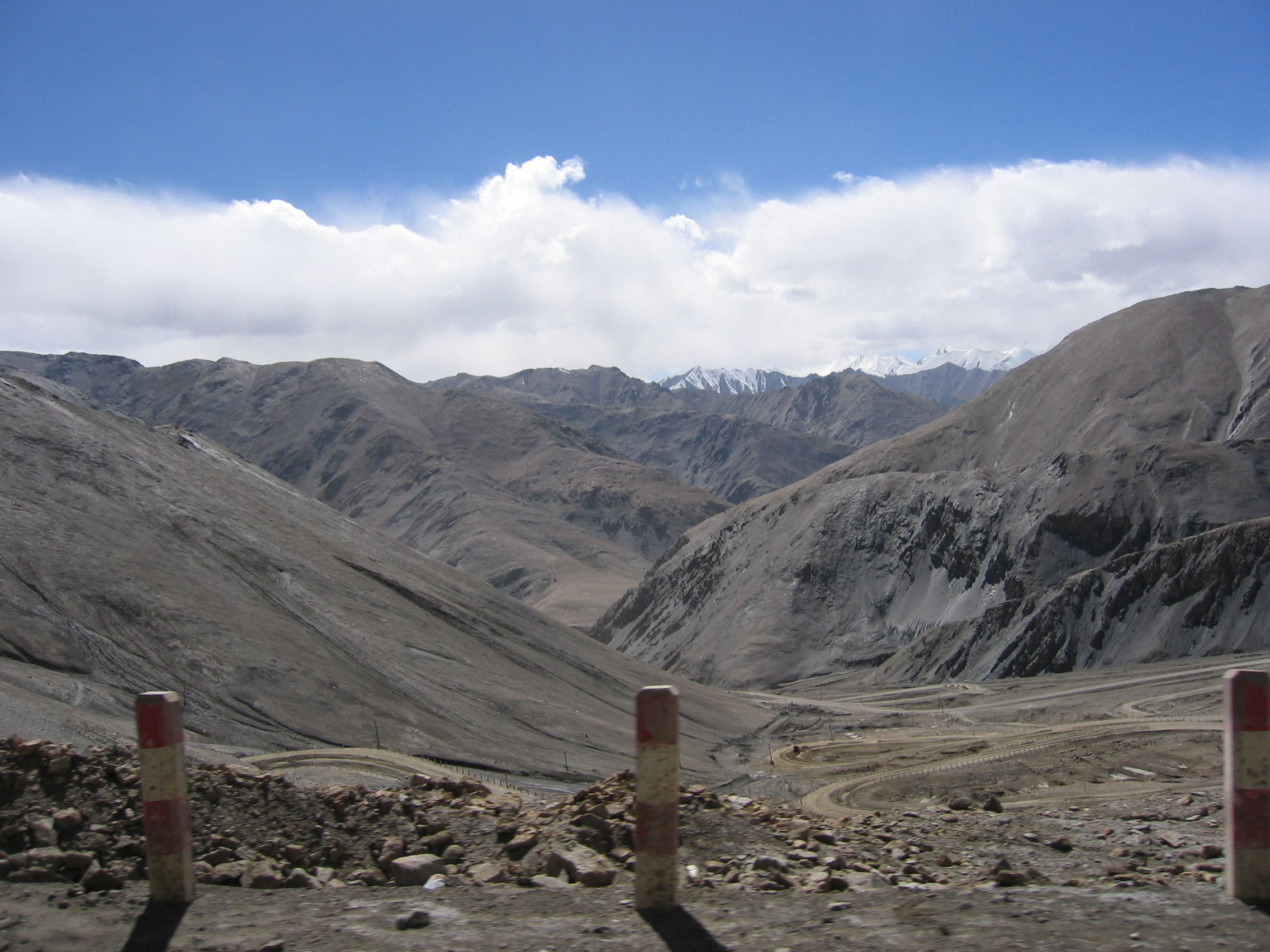
- The western Kunlun Mountains from the Xinjiang-Tibet Highway, near the border between Hekang County and Kargilik County
- Interactive map of Hekang County
- Coordinates: 36°21′06″N 78°01′48″E
- Country: China
- Province: Xinjiang
- Prefecture-level city: Hotan
- County seat: Kunling Township
- Time zone: UTC+8 (China Standard)

Hekang County

Chinese name
- Simplified Chinese: 和康县
- Traditional Chinese: 和康縣
Transcriptions
Standard Mandarin
- Hanyu Pinyin: Hékāng Xiàn

Uyghur name
- Uyghur: سەيدۇللا ناھىيىسى
Transcriptions
- Latin Yëziqi: Seydulla Nahiyisi

Hekang County (Chinese: 和康; pinyin: Hékāng) is a county in the southwest of the Xinjiang Uyghur Autonomous Region and is under the administration of the Hotan Prefecture. It administers part of Aksai Chin. The seat of the administration is Kunling Township, known as Saitula Township prior to June 2025.

== History ==
On 27 December 2024, The people's government of northwest China's Xinjiang Uygur Autonomous Region announced the establishment of Hekang County.

The establishment of the county, administered by Hotan Prefecture, was approved by the Central Committee of the Chinese Communist Party and the State Council of the People's Republic of China. In response to the creation of the county, Ministry of External Affairs of India spokesperson Randhir Jaiswal stated that India "never accepted the illegal Chinese occupation of Indian territory in this area" and "creation of new counties will neither have a bearing on India's long-standing and consistent position regarding our sovereignty over the area nor lend legitimacy to China's illegal and forcible occupation of the same." India, which considers Aksai Chin as Indian territory under Chinese occupation, issued protest regarding the creation of the county with the Chinese side through diplomatic channels.

The county seat of Hekang is Kunling Township, formerly called "Saitula".

== Transportation ==
- China National Highway 219
