= Hongshan Lake =

Alkaline lake in Aksai Chin

- 红山湖 (Chinese)
- Location within Southern Xinjiang Location within Ngari
- Location: Aksai Chin, Rutog County, Ngari Prefecture, Tibet
- Coordinates: 34°49′55″N 80°3′15″E
- Surface area: 24 km^{2} (9.3 sq mi)
- Surface elevation: 5,060 m (16,600 ft)
- Frozen: Winter

Hongshan Lake is an alkaline lake located in the disputed territory of Aksai Chin in Rutog County, Ngari Prefecture, Tibet of China.

== Location ==
The lake is located in the extreme east of Aksai Chin and China National Highway 219 passes through its eastern bank.
