= Surigh Yilganing Kol =

Alkaline lake in Aksai Chin

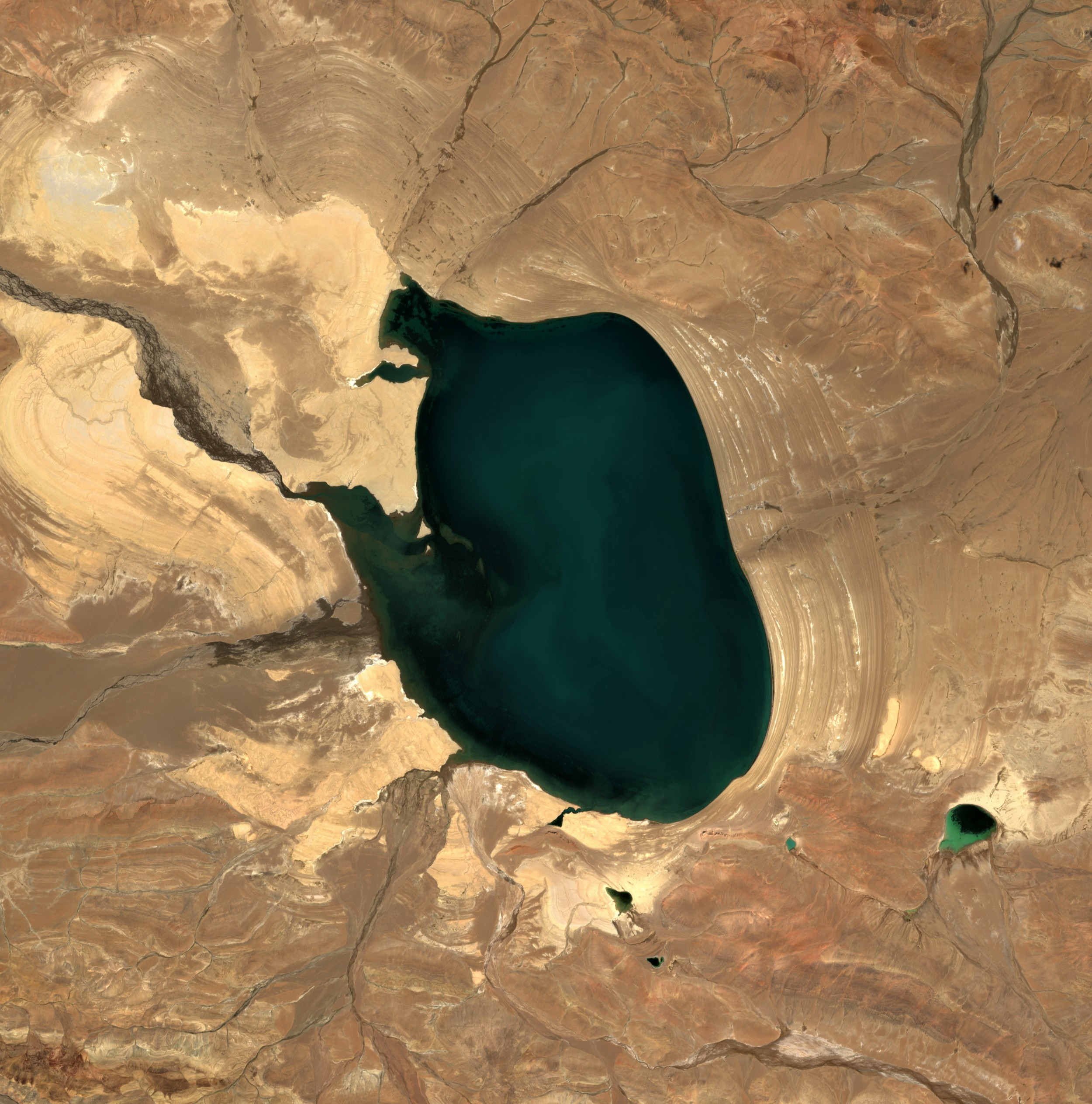
- Sentinel-2 image (2021)

- Location within Southern Xinjiang
- Interactive map of Surigh Yilganing Kol
- Location: Aksai Chin, Hotan Prefecture, Xinjiang
- Coordinates: 34°41′09.51″N 79°41′21.49″E
- Surface area: 70.8 km^{2} (27.3 sq mi)
- Surface elevation: 4,800 m (15,700 ft)
- Frozen: Winter

Surigh Yilganing Kol (also known as Salikyila Genzhi Tso, zh; 萨利吉勒干南库勒) is an alkaline lake located in the disputed territory of Aksai Chin in Hotan Prefecture of Xinjiang province of China.

== Location ==
The lake is located in the southeast part of Lingzi Thang plains, and can be reached through an unpaved road passing from north bank of Lake Songmuxi Co. The road originates as an offshoot of China National Highway 219 at 35°38′46.34″N 80°18′33.85″E.

== History ==
In the 1950s, prior to the Sino-Indian War, India collected salt from this lake and two other lakes in Aksai Chin to study the economic feasibility of potential salt mining operations. Only Aksai Chin Lake was deemed economically viable.
