= Tso Tang =

Alkaline lake in Aksai Chin

- མཚོ་ཐང (Standard Tibetan)
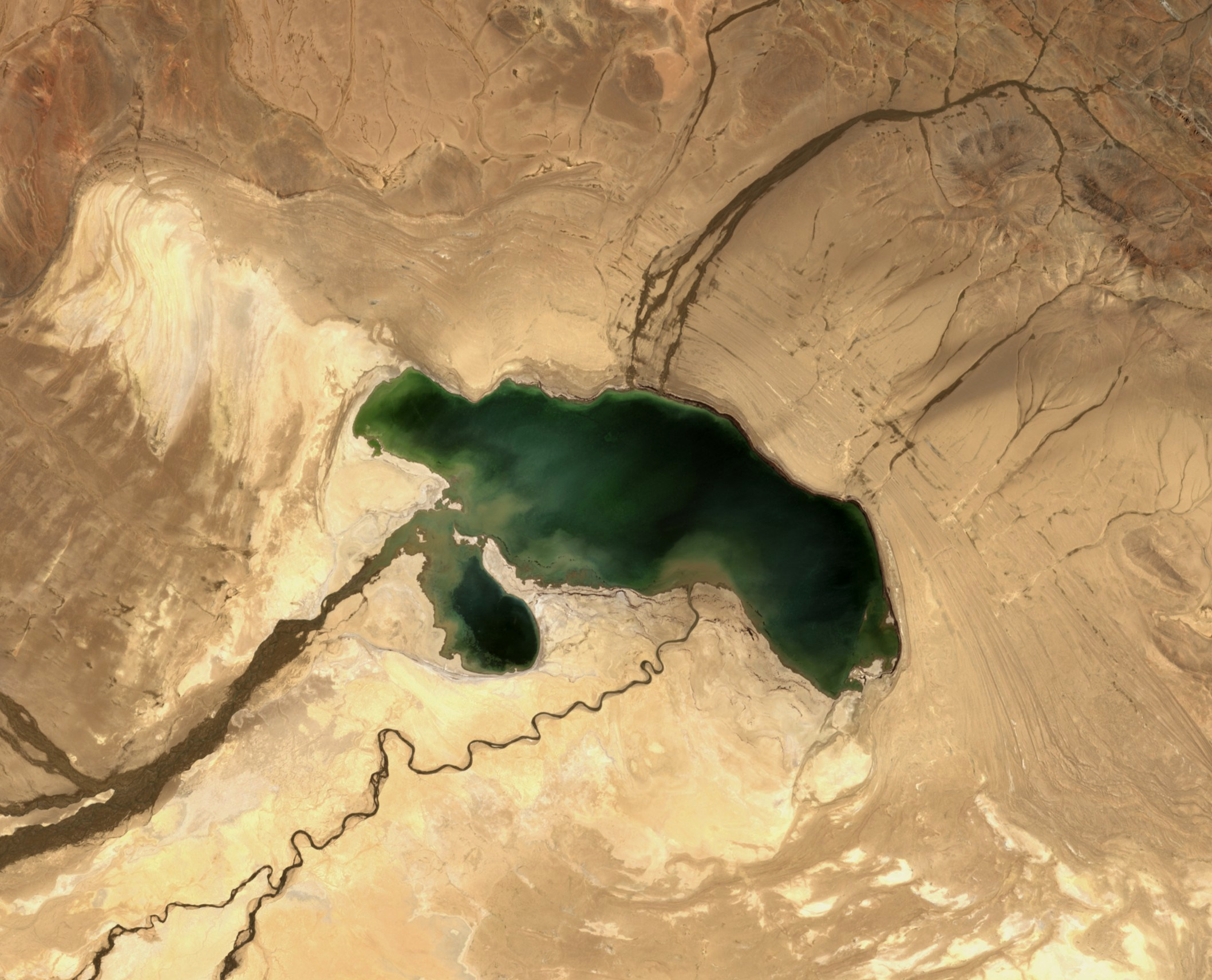
- Sentinel-2 image (2022)

- Location within Southern Xinjiang
- Interactive map of Tso Tang
- Location: Aksai Chin, Hotan Prefecture, Xinjiang
- Coordinates: 34°53′42.96″N 79°21′29.94″E
- Surface area: 38 km^{2} (15 sq mi)
- Surface elevation: 4,800 m (15,700 ft)
- Frozen: Winter

Tso Tang

Chinese name
- Simplified Chinese: 到腾格湖
Transcriptions
Standard Mandarin
- Hanyu Pinyin: dàoténggé hú

Alternative Chinese name
- Simplified Chinese: 列腾格湖
Transcriptions
Standard Mandarin
- Hanyu Pinyin: lièténggé hú

Second alternative Chinese name
- Simplified Chinese: 倒腾格湖
Transcriptions
Standard Mandarin
- Hanyu Pinyin: dǎotenggé hú

Tibetan name
- Tibetan: མཚོ་ཐང
Transcriptions
- Wylie: mtsho thang
- THL: tso tang

Tso Tang (Historically Tso Thang; Tibetan: མཚོ་ཐང; lit. 'Lake of the Plain') is an alkaline lake located in the disputed territory of Aksai Chin in Hotan Prefecture of Xinjiang province of China.

== History ==
In the late 1800s, in order to facilitate trade between the Indian subcontinent and the Tarim Basin, the British attempted to promote a caravan route via the Chang Chenmo Valley as an alternative to the difficult and tariffed Karakoram Pass. Tso Tang was on this route. British Army surgeon Henry Cayley who was part of a mission to Yarkand that took this route noted the lake as "brackish but quite potable."
