= Aksai Chin Lake =

Endorheic lake in Chinese-administered Kashmir

- Amtogor Tso (Standard Tibetan)
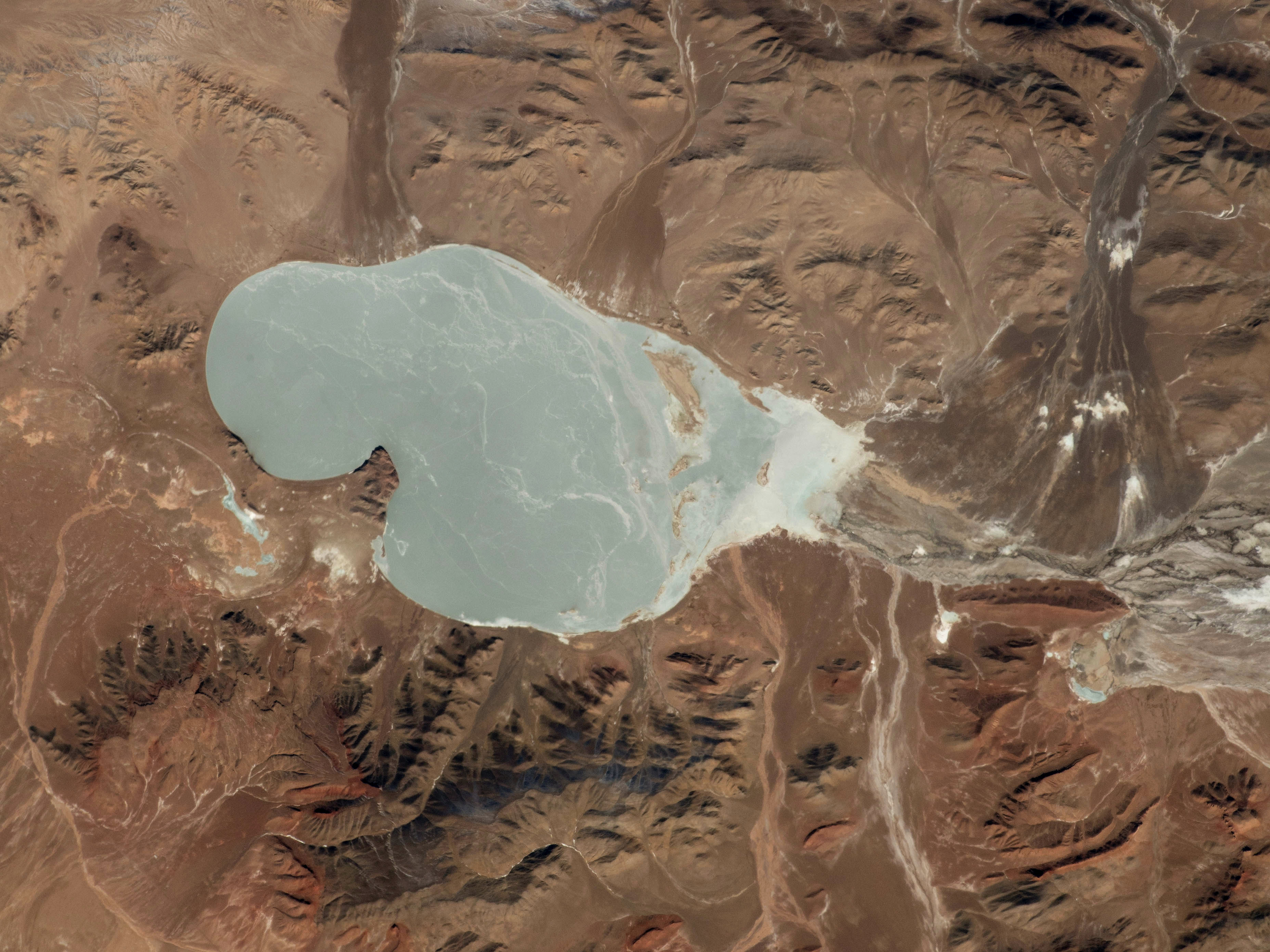
- View of Aksai Chin Lake taken during ISS Expedition 54.

- Location within Southern Xinjiang Location within Ladakh
- Location: Aksai Chin (disputed territory)
- Coordinates: 35°13′N 79°51′E
- Type: Salt lake
- Etymology: See Aksai Chin § Name
- Primary outflows: evaporation
- Max. length: 15 kilometres (9.3 mi)
- Max. width: 8 kilometres (5.0 mi)
- Surface area: 160 square kilometres (62 sq mi)
- Max. depth: 12.6 metres (41 ft)
- Water volume: 136.2698 cubic kilometres (32.6929 cu mi)
- Surface elevation: 4,844 metres (15,892 ft)

Aksai Chin Lake or Aksayqin Lake, (Chinese: 阿克赛钦湖; pinyin: Ākèsàiqīn Hú) is an endorheic lake in the disputed region of Aksai Chin. The plateau is administered by China but also claimed by India. Its Tibetan / Ladakhi name is Amtogar or Amtogor Tso which means "encounter with a round object".

== Geography ==
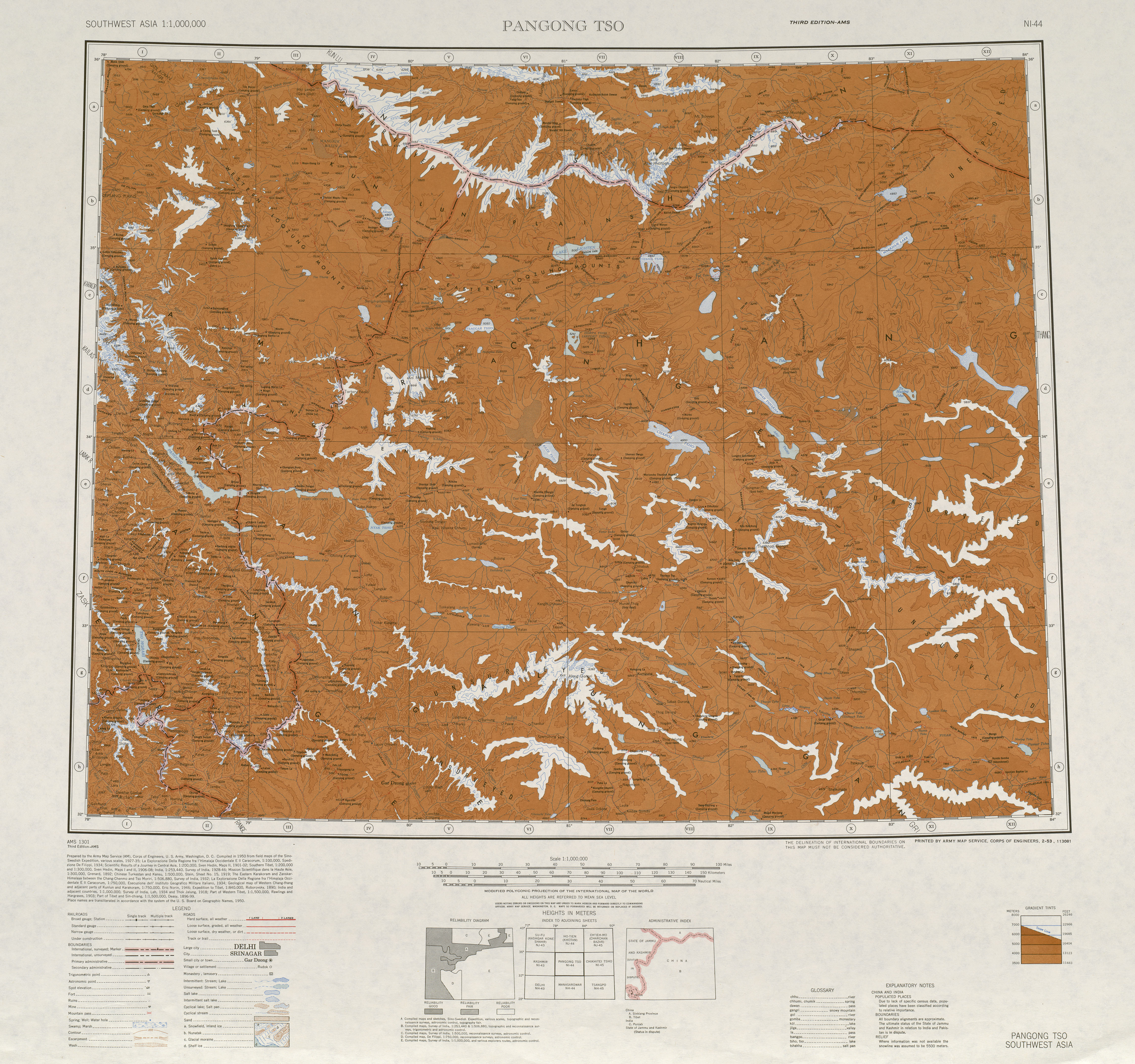
Map including the lake Aksai Chin (AMS, 1950) (Note: From map: "THE DELINEATION OF INTERNATIONAL BOUNDARIES ON THIS MAP MUST NOT BE CONSIDERED AUTHORITATIVE.")

The lake is part of Hotan County, Hotan Prefecture, Xinjiang, The lake is located just south of the Kunlun Mountains. It is approximately 15 kilometres (9.3 mi) long and 6 kilometres (3.7 mi)-8 kilometres (5.0 mi) across. It is fed by the river of the same name, Aksai Chin River.

China National Highway 219 passes some 20 kilometres (12 mi) to the southwest of the lake on its way from Shiquanhe, Tibet to Yarkand, Xinjiang. The lake itself is within Hotan County of Xinjiang, and the official Xinjiang-Tibet border runs about 20 kilometres (12 mi) east of the lake.

== History ==
In the 1950s, prior to the Sino-Indian War, India collected salt from this lake and two other lakes in Aksai Chin to study the economic feasibility of potential salt mining operations. This lake was the only lake deemed economically viable.

== See also ==
- List of locations in Aksai Chin
