= Aksai Chin =

Part of Kashmir administered by China

Aksai Chin Aksayqin
- Territory administered by China
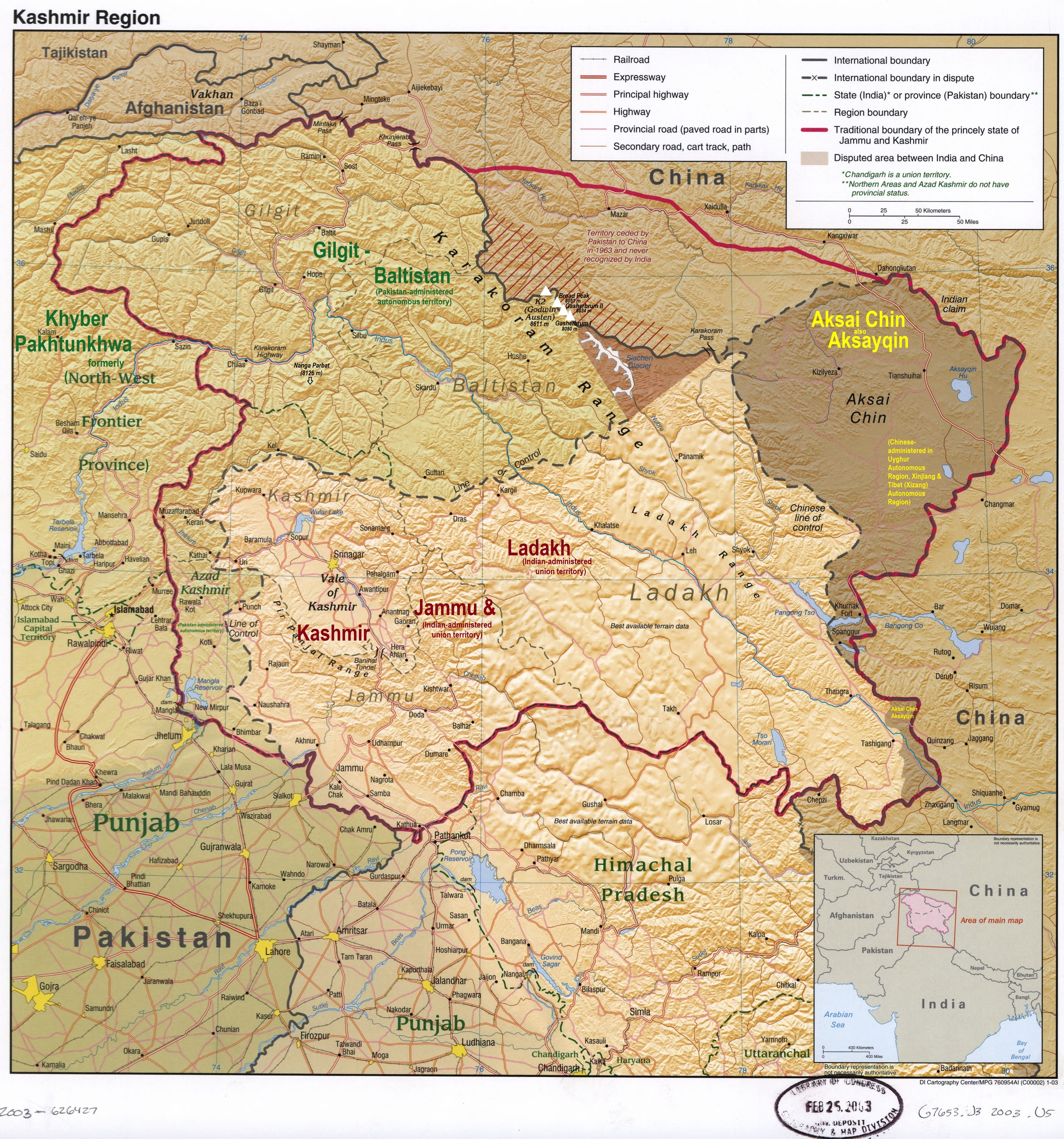
- A map of the disputed Kashmir region showing the Chinese-administered territory of Aksai Chin in dark brown on the right.
- Interactive map of Aksai Chin
- Coordinates: 35.0°N 79.0°E
- Country: People's Republic of China (administered by); India (claimed by)
- County or District: He'an County and Hekang County in Hotan Prefecture, Xinjiang; Rutog County in Ngari Prefecture, Tibet; Leh district in Ladakh (claimed by India)

Area
  - Total: 38,000 km^{2} (15,000 sq mi)

Aksai Chin is a region administered by China and constituting the easternmost portion of the larger Kashmir region that has been the subject of a border dispute between China and India since 1959. China administers it as part of He'an County and Hekang County of Hotan Prefecture, Xinjiang, and Rutog County of Ngari Prefecture, Tibet. India claims the territory, considering it part of Leh district in the union territory of Ladakh.

== Name ==
Aksai Chin was first mentioned by Muhammad Amin, the Yarkandi guide of the Schlagintweit brothers, who were contracted in 1854 by the British East India Company to explore Central Asia. Amin explained its meaning as "the great white sand desert". Linguist George van Driem states that the name intended by Amin was Aqsai Chöl (Uyghur: ئاقساي چۆل; Cyrillic: ақсай чөл) which could mean "white ravine desert" or "white coomb desert". The word chöl for desert seems to have been corrupted in English transliteration into "chin".

Some sources have interpreted Aksai to have the Uyghur meaning "white stone desert", including several British colonial, modern Western, Chinese, and Indian sources. Some modern sources interpret it to mean "white brook" instead. At least one source interprets Aksai to mean "eastern" in the Yarkandi Uyghur dialect.

The word "Chin" was taken to mean "China" by some Chinese, Western, and Indian sources. At least one source takes it to mean "pass". Other sources omit "Chin" in their interpretations. Van Driem states that there is no Uyghur word resembling "chin" for China.

Amin's Aksai Chin was not a defined region, stretching indefinitely east into Tibet south of the Kunlun Mountains. In 1895, the British envoy to Kashgar told the Chinese Taotai that Aksai Chin was a "loose name for an ill-defined, elevated tableland", part of which lay in Indian and part in Chinese territory.

The current meaning of the term is the area under dispute between India and China, having evolved in repeated usage since Indian independence in 1947.

== History ==
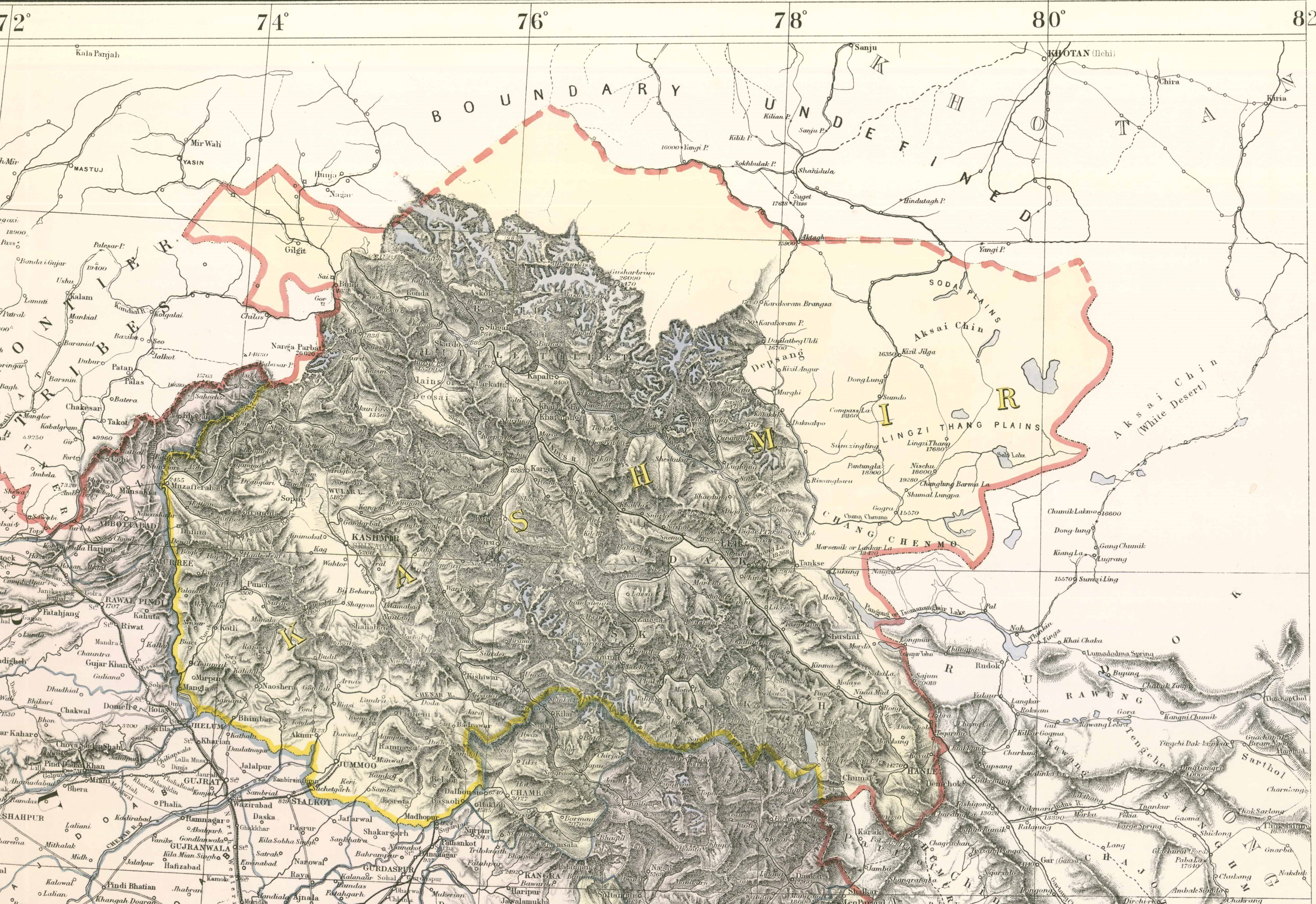
Boundary of Kashmir in the 1888 Survey of India map of India. The undefined boundary shown in dashed line runs through Malubiting, Raskam, Aktagh and the Karakash River bend.

Because of its 5,000-metre (16,000 ft) elevation, the desolation of Aksai Chin meant that it had no human importance. However, for military purposes the region was strategically important, as it lay on the only year-round passable route between the Tarim Basin and Tibet.

Ladakh was conquered in 1842 by the armies of Raja Gulab Singh (Dogra) under the suzerainty of the Sikh Empire. The British defeat of the Sikhs in 1846 resulted in the transfer of the Jammu and Kashmir region including Ladakh to the British, who then installed Gulab Singh as the Maharaja under their suzerainty. The British appointed a boundary commission headed by Alexander Cunningham to determine the boundaries of the state. Chinese and Tibetan officials were invited to jointly demarcate the border, but they did not show any interest. The British boundary commissioners fixed the southern part of the boundary up to the Chang Chenmo Valley, but regarded the area north of it as terra incognita.

=== The Johnson Line ===
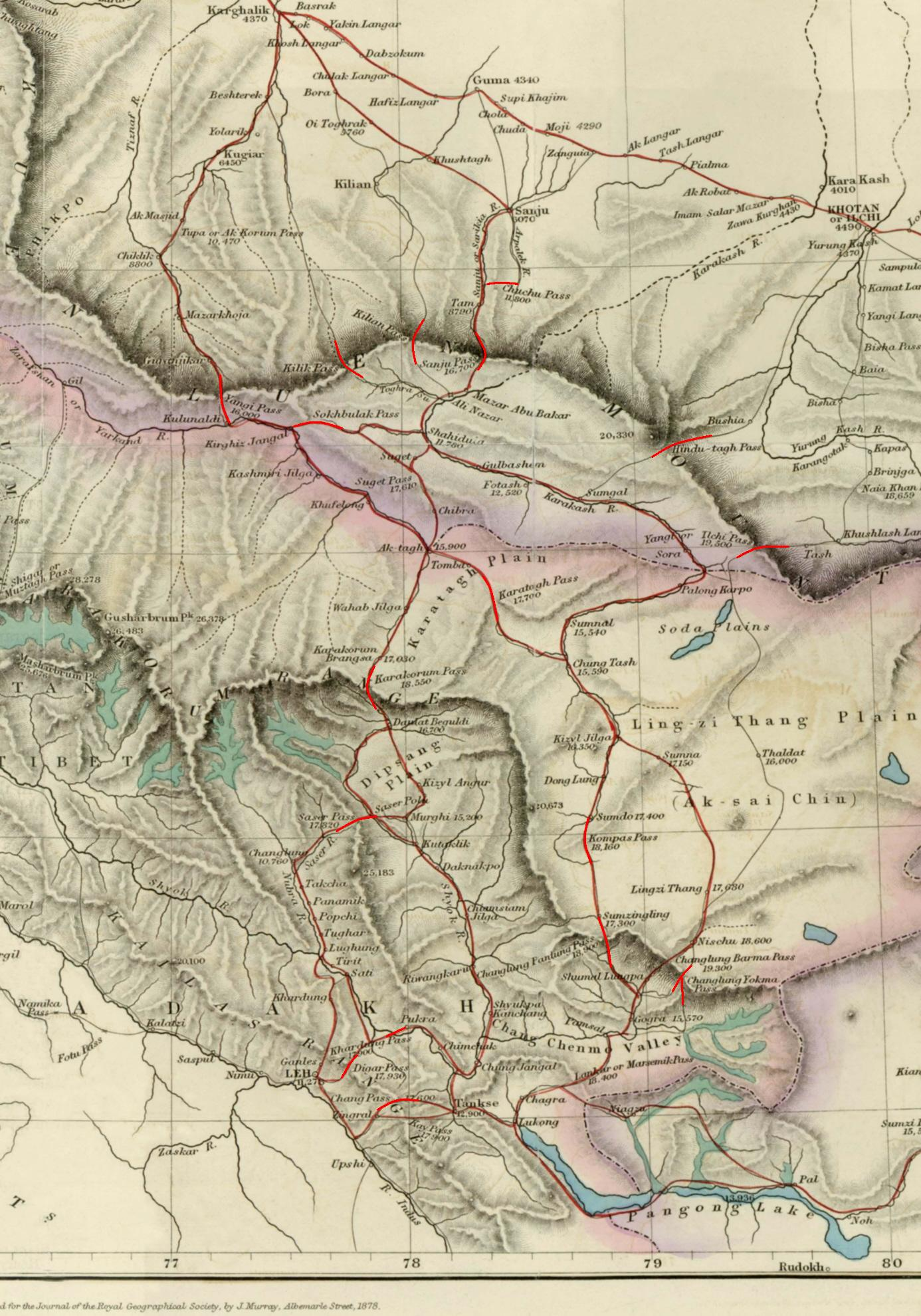
Map of Central Asia (1873) by T. Douglas Forsyth. The border claimed by the British for India is shown in the two-toned purple and pink band with Shahidulla and the Kilik, Kilian and Sanju passes north of the border.

William Johnson, a civil servant with the Survey of India proposed the "Johnson Line" in 1865, which put Aksai Chin in Kashmir. This was the time of the Dungan revolt, when China did not control most of Xinjiang, so this line was never presented to the Chinese. Johnson presented this line to the Maharaja of Kashmir, who then claimed the 18,000 square kilometres contained within, and by some accounts territory further north as far as the Sanju Pass in the Kun Lun Mountains. The Maharajah of Kashmir constructed a fort at Shahidulla (modern-day Xaidulla), and had troops stationed there for some years to protect caravans. Eventually, most sources placed Shahidulla and the upper Karakash River firmly within the territory of Xinjiang (see accompanying map). According to Francis Younghusband, who explored the region in the late 1880s, there was only an abandoned fort and not one inhabited house at Shahidulla when he was there – it was just a convenient staging post and a convenient headquarters for the nomadic Kirghiz. The abandoned fort had apparently been built a few years earlier by the Kashmiris. In 1878 the Chinese had reconquered Xinjiang, and by 1890 they already had Shahidulla before the issue was decided. By 1892, China had erected boundary markers at Karakoram Pass.

In 1897, a British military officer, Sir John Ardagh, proposed a boundary line along the crest of the Kun Lun Mountains north of the Yarkand River. At that time, Britain was concerned about the danger of Russian expansion as China weakened, and Ardagh argued that his line was more defensible. The Ardagh line was effectively a modification of the Johnson line, and became known as the "Johnson-Ardagh Line".

=== The Macartney–Macdonald Line ===
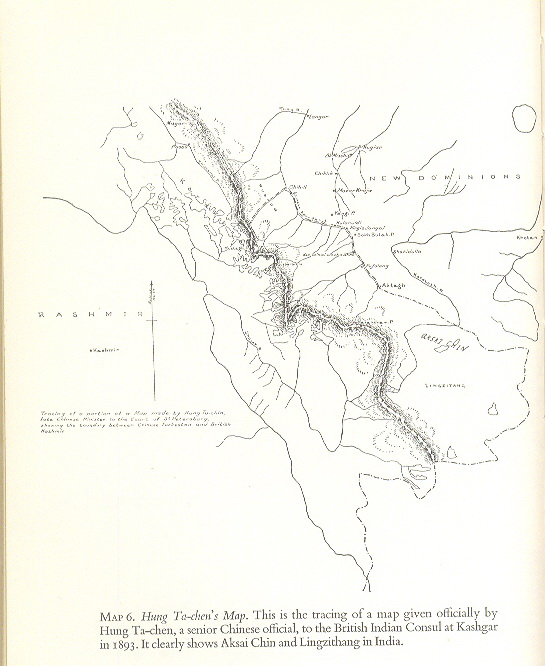
The map given by Hung Ta-chen to the British consul at Kashgar in 1893. The boundary, marked with a thin dot-dashed line, matches the Johnson line.^{:pp. 73, 78}

In 1893, Hung Ta-chen, a senior Chinese official at St. Petersburg, gave maps of the region to George Macartney, the British consul general at Kashgar, which coincided in broad details. In 1899, Britain proposed a revised boundary, initially suggested by Macartney and developed by the Governor General of India Lord Elgin. This boundary placed the Lingzi Tang plains, which are south of the Laktsang range, in India, and Aksai Chin proper, which is north of the Laktsang range, in China. This border, along the Karakoram Mountains, was proposed and supported by British officials for a number of reasons. The Karakoram Mountains formed a natural boundary, which would set the British borders up to the Indus River watershed while leaving the Tarim River watershed in Chinese control, and Chinese control of this tract would present a further obstacle to Russian advance in Central Asia. The British presented this line, known as the Macartney–MacDonald Line, to the Chinese in 1899 in a note by Sir Claude MacDonald. The Qing government did not respond to the note. According to some commentators, China believed that this had been the accepted boundary.

=== 1899 to 1947 ===
Both the Johnson-Ardagh and the Macartney-MacDonald lines were used on British maps of India. Until at least 1908, the British took the Macdonald line to be the boundary, but in 1911, the Xinhai Revolution resulted in the collapse of central power in China, and by the end of World War I, the British officially used the Johnson Line. However they took no steps to establish outposts or assert actual control on the ground. In 1927, the line was adjusted again as the government of British India abandoned the Johnson line in favor of a line along the Karakoram range further south. However, the maps were not updated and still showed the Johnson Line.

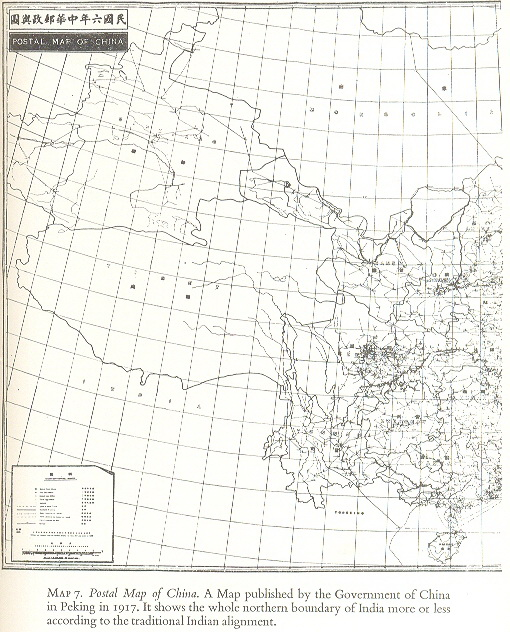
Postal map of China published by the Republic of China in 1917. The boundary in Aksai Chin is as per the Johnson line.

From 1917 to 1933, the Postal Atlas of China, published by the Government of China in Peking had shown the boundary in Aksai Chin as per the Johnson line, which runs along the Kunlun Mountains. The Peking University Atlas, published in 1925, also put the Aksai Chin in India. When British officials learned of Soviet officials surveying the Aksai Chin for Sheng Shih-tsai, warlord of Xinjiang in 1940–1941, they again advocated the Johnson Line. At this point the British had still made no attempts to establish outposts or control over the Aksai Chin, nor was the issue ever discussed with the governments of China or Tibet, and the boundary remained undemarcated at India's independence.

=== Since 1947 ===
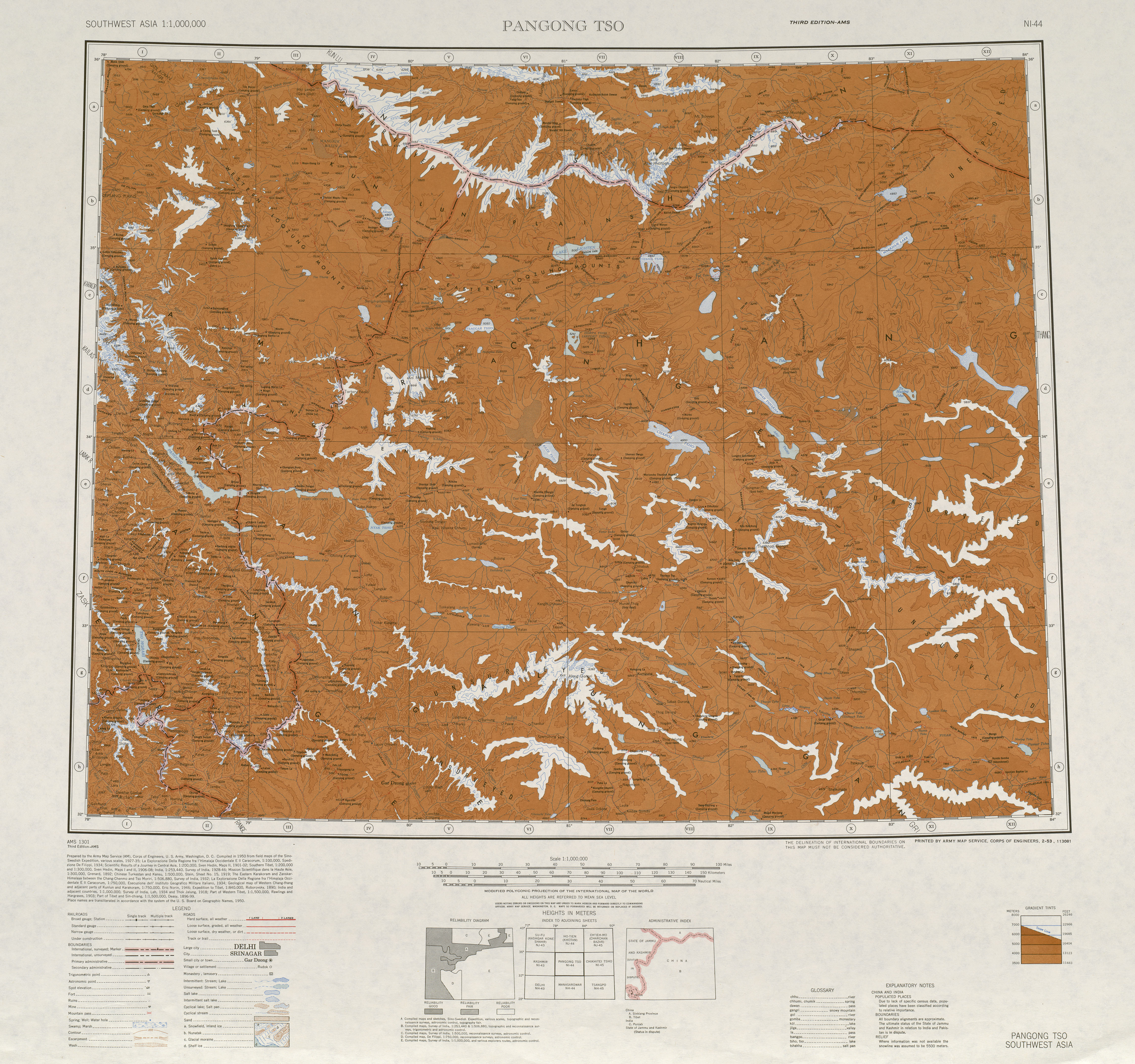
Map including the Aksai Chin region (AMS, 1950)

After Jammu and Kashmir acceded to the newly independent India in October 1947, the government of India used the Johnson Line as the basis for its official boundary in the west, which included the Aksai Chin. From the Karakoram Pass (which is not under dispute), the Indian claim line extends northeast of the Karakoram Mountains through the salt flats of the Aksai Chin, to set a boundary at the Kunlun Mountains, and incorporating part of the Karakash River and Yarkand River watersheds. From there, it runs east along the Kunlun Mountains, before turning southwest through the Aksai Chin salt flats, through the Karakoram Mountains, and then to Panggong Lake.

On 1 July 1954, Prime Minister Jawaharlal Nehru wrote a memo directing that the maps of India be revised to show definite boundaries on all frontiers. Up to this point, the boundary in the Aksai Chin sector, based on the Johnson Line, had been described as "undemarcated."

Map showing Chinese and Indian claims over Aksai Chin, the Macartney-MacDonald line, the Foreign Office Line, as well as the progress of Chinese forces as they occupied areas during the Sino-Indian War

Despite this region being nearly uninhabitable and having no resources, it remains strategically important for China as it connects Tibet and Xinjiang. During the 1950s, the People's Republic of China built a 1,200 km (750 mi) China National Highway 219 connecting Xinjiang and western Tibet, of which 179 km (112 mi) ran south of the Johnson Line through the Aksai Chin region claimed by India. Aksai Chin was easily accessible to the Chinese, but was more difficult for the Indians on the other side of the Karakorams to reach. The Indians did not learn of the existence of the road until 1957, which was confirmed when the road was shown in Chinese maps published in 1958. The construction of this highway was one of the triggers for the Sino-Indian War of 1962.

The Indian position, as stated by Prime Minister Nehru, was that the Aksai Chin was "part of the Ladakh region of India for centuries" and that this northern border was a "firm and definite one which was not open to discussion with anybody".

The Chinese premier Zhou Enlai argued that the western border had never been delimited, that the Macartney-MacDonald Line, which left the Aksai Chin within Chinese borders was the only line ever proposed to a Chinese government, and that the Aksai Chin was already under Chinese jurisdiction, and that negotiations should take into account the status quo.

In June 2006, satellite imagery on the Google Earth service revealed a 1:500 scale terrain model of eastern Aksai Chin and adjacent Tibet, built near the town of Huangyangtan, about 35 kilometres (22 mi) southwest of Yinchuan, the capital of the autonomous region of Ningxia in China. A visual side-by-side comparison shows a very detailed duplication of Aksai Chin in the camp. The 900 m × 700 m (3,000 ft × 2,300 ft) model was surrounded by a substantial facility, with rows of red-roofed buildings, scores of olive-coloured trucks and a large compound with elevated lookout posts and a large communications tower. Such terrain models are known to be used in military training and simulation, although usually on a much smaller scale.

Local authorities in Ningxia claim that their model of Aksai Chin is part of a tank training ground, built in 1998 or 1999.

In August 2017, Indian and Chinese forces near Pangong Tso threw rocks at each other.

On 11 September 2019, People's Liberation Army troops confronted Indian troops on the northern bank of Pangong Lake.

A continued face-off in the 2020 China–India skirmishes of May and June 2020 between Indian and Chinese troops near Pangong Tso Lake culminated in a violent clash on 16 June 2020, with at least 20 deaths on the Indian side and no official reported deaths on the Chinese side. In 2021, Chinese state media reported four Chinese deaths. Both sides claimed provocation from the other.

== Geography ==
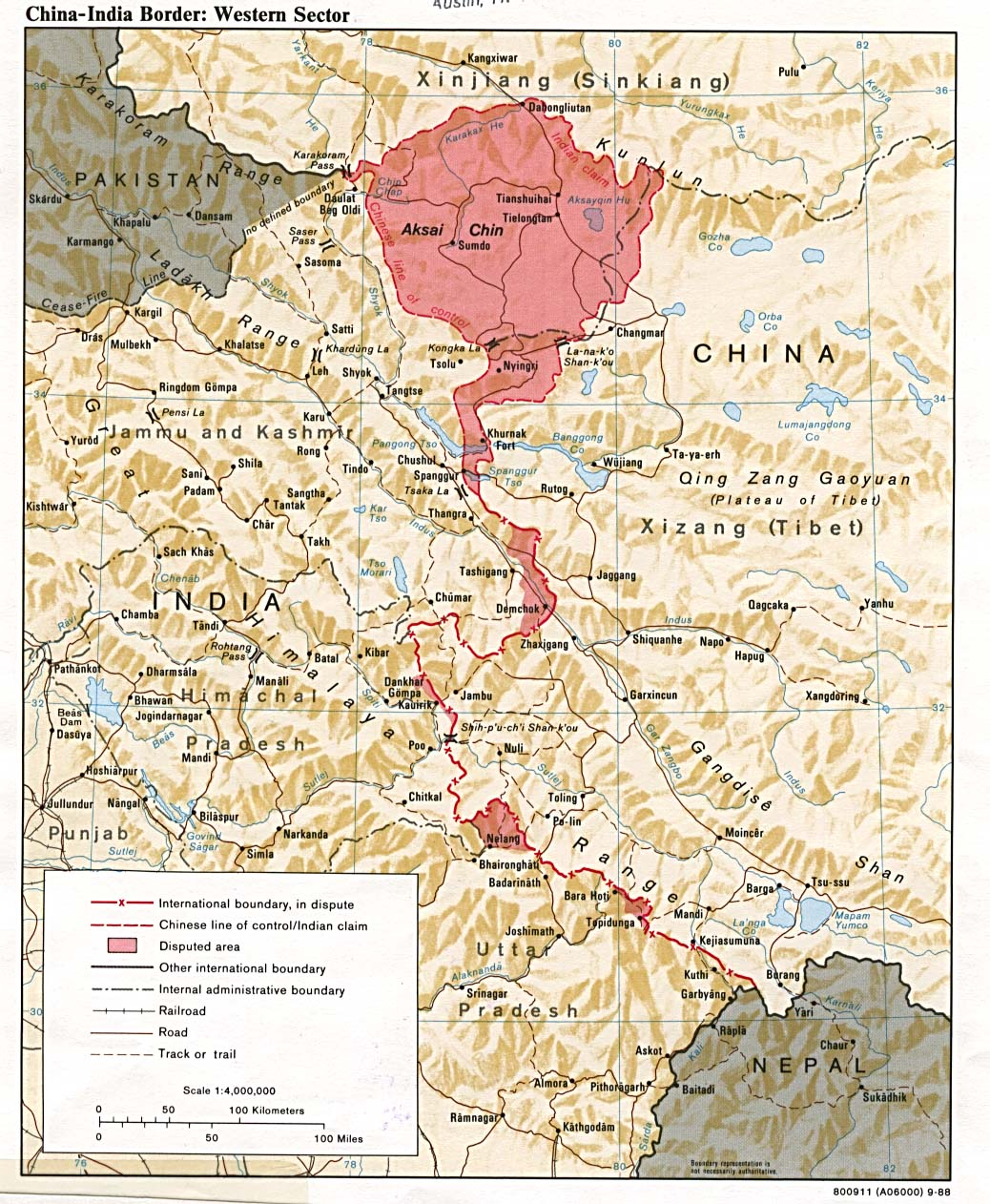
A 1988 CIA-made topographical map of the western China-India border, showing Aksai Chin and other contested territories

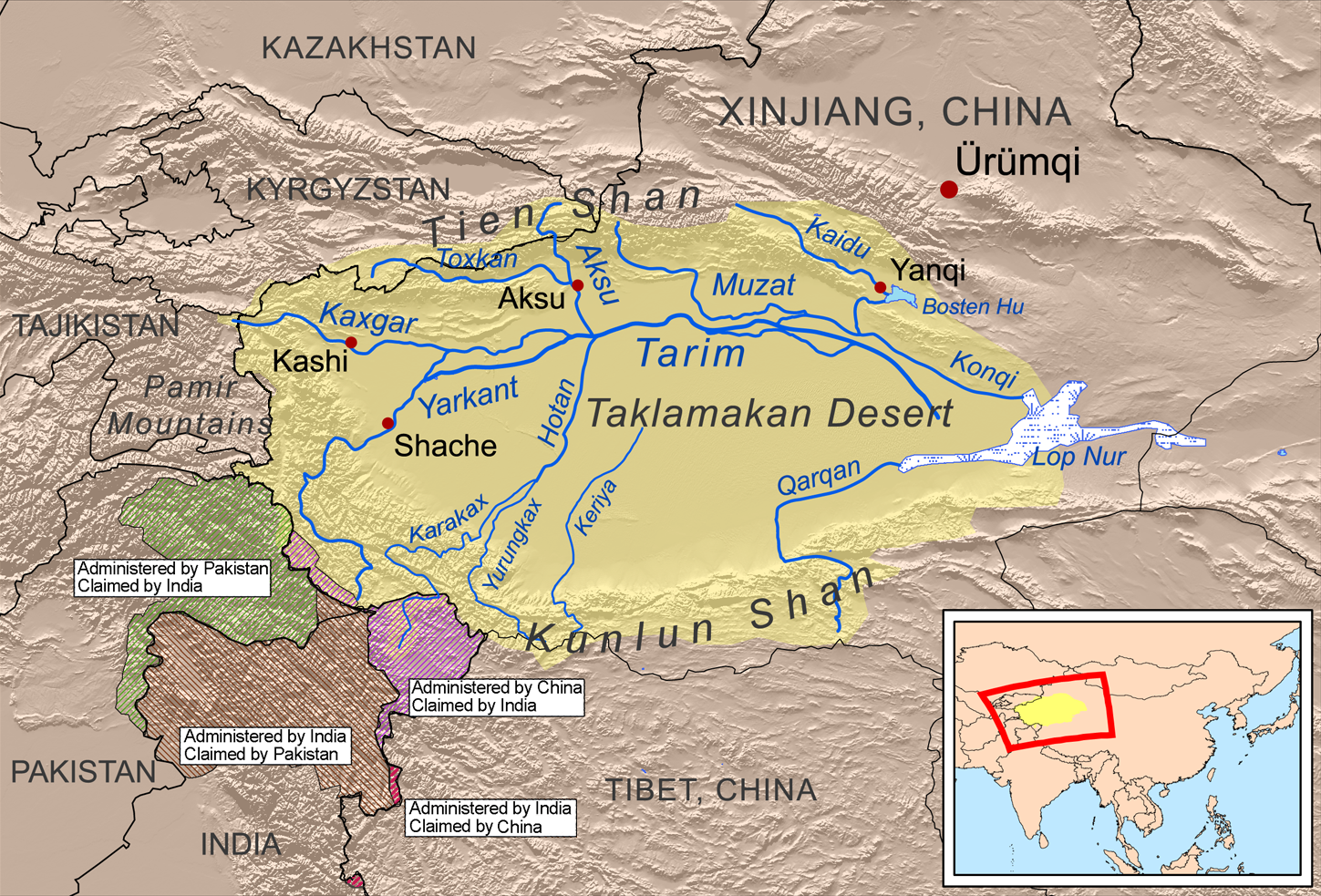
2008 map of the Tarim River Basin

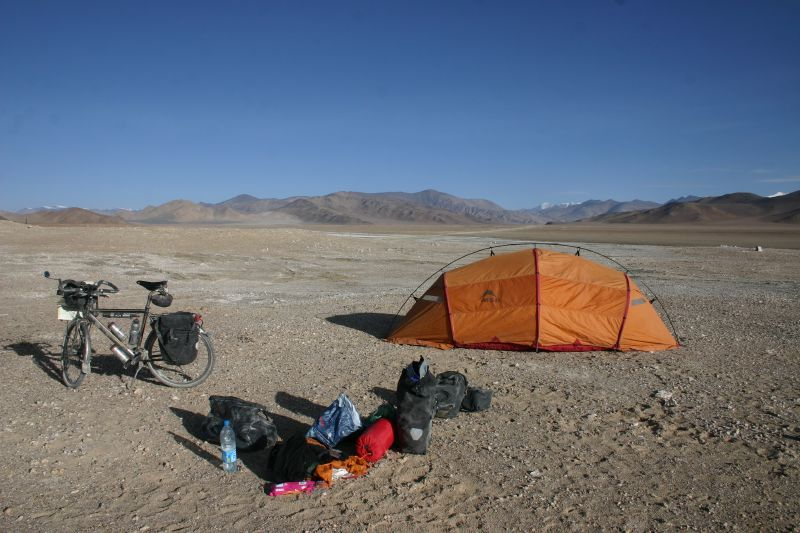
Northern plains of Aksai Chin looking towards Qitai Daban (Khitai Dawan)

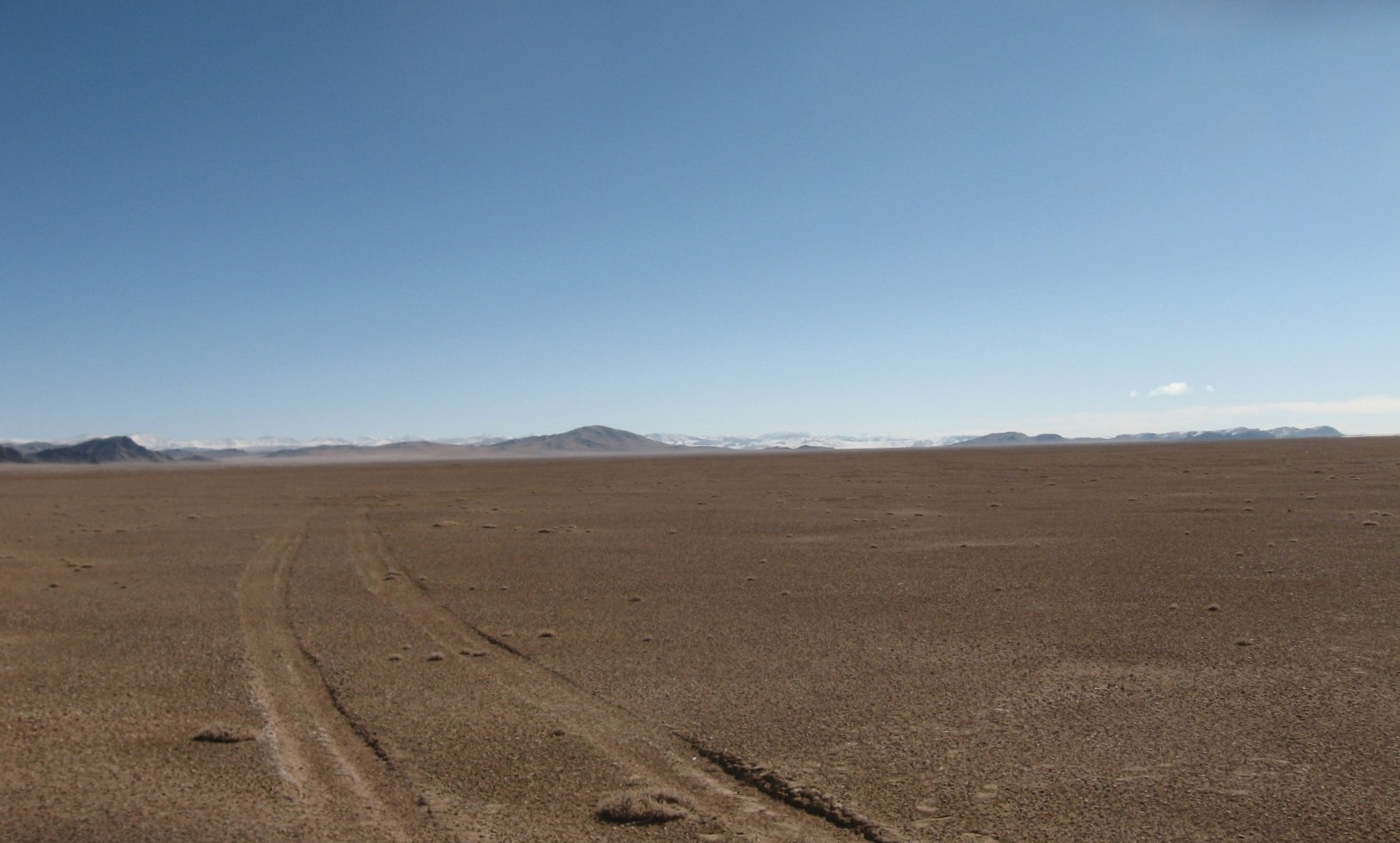
A view of Aksai Chin

Aksai Chin is one of the two large disputed border areas between India and China. India claims Aksai Chin as the easternmost part of the union territory of Ladakh. China claims that Aksai Chin is part of the Xinjiang Uyghur Autonomous Region and Tibet Autonomous Region. The line that separates Indian-administered areas of Ladakh from Aksai Chin is known as the Line of Actual Control (LAC) and is concurrent with the Chinese Aksai Chin claim line.

The Aksai region is a sparsely populated region with few settlements such as Heweitan, Khurnak Fort, Tianshuihai and Dahongliutan and Kangxiwar which lays north of it, with the latter being the forward headquarters of the Xinjiang Military Command during the 1962 Sino-Indian War.

Aksai Chin covers an area of approximately 38,000 square kilometres (15,000 mi^{2}). The area is largely a vast high-altitude desert with a low point (on the Karakash River) at about 4,300 m (14,100 ft) above sea level. In the southwest, mountains up to 7,000 m (23,000 ft) extending southeast from the Depsang Plains form the de facto border (Line of Actual Control) between Aksai Chin and Indian-controlled Kashmir.

In the north, the Kunlun Range separates Aksai Chin from the Tarim Basin, where the rest of Hotan Prefecture is situated. As of 2008, no roads crossed the Kunlun Range within Hotan Prefecture, and only one track does so, over the Hindutash Pass.

Aksai Chin area has number of endorheic basins with many salt or soda lakes. The major salt lakes are Surigh Yilganing Kol, Tso Tang, Aksai Chin Lake, Hongshan Lake, etc. Much of the northern part of Aksai Chin is referred to as the Soda Plains, located near Aksai Chin's largest river, the Karakash, which receives meltwater from a number of glaciers, crosses the Kunlun farther northwest, in Hekang County and enters the Tarim Basin, where it serves as one of the main sources of water for Karakax and Hotan Counties.

The western part of Aksai Chin region is drained by the Tarim River. The eastern part of the region contains several small endorheic basins. The largest of them is that of the Aksai Chin Lake, which is fed by the river of the same name. The region as a whole receives little precipitation as the Himalayas and the Karakoram block the rains from the Indian monsoon.

The nearby Trans-Karakoram Tract is also the subject of ongoing dispute between China and India in the Kashmir dispute.

== Demographics and economics ==
Prior to 1950, the visitors of Aksai Chin were, for the most part, the occasional explorers, hunters, and nomads who passed through the area.

Prior to European exploration in the 1860s, there were some jade mining operations on the Xinjiang side of Aksai Chin. They were abandoned by the time European explorers reached the area. In the 1860s to 1870s, in order to facilitate trade between the Indian subcontinent and Tarim Basin, the British attempted to promote a caravan route via the western side of Aksai Chin as an alternative to the difficult and tariffed Karakoram Pass. The route, referred to as the Chang Chenmo line after the starting point in Chang Chenmo River valley, was discussed in the House of Commons in 1874. In addition of being longer and higher elevation than Karakoram Pass, it also goes through the desolate desert of Aksai Chin. By 1890s, traders had mostly given up on this route.

In 1958, India collected salt from various lakes in Aksai Chin to study the economic feasibility of salt mining operations in the area.

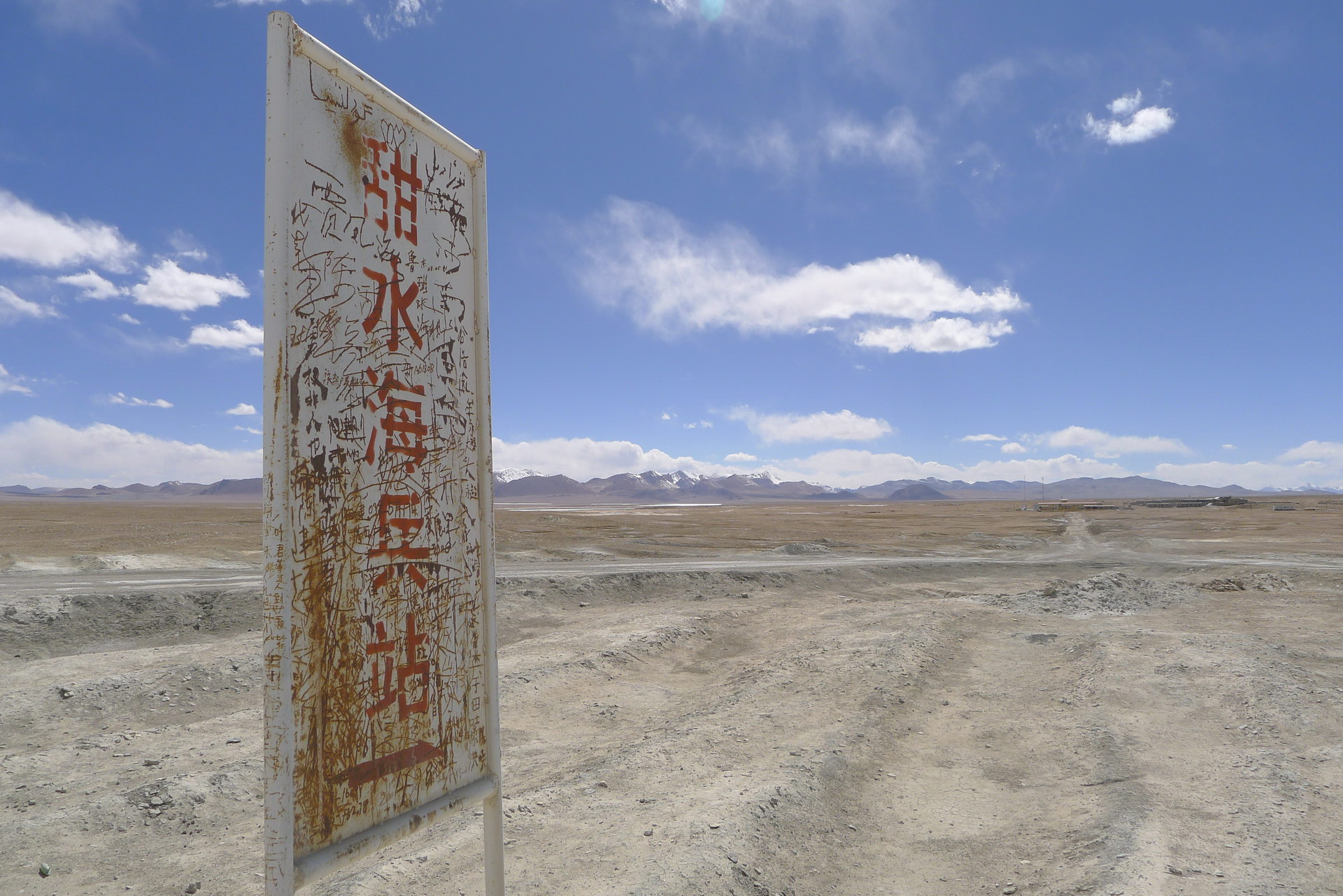
Sign of a PLAGF service station in Tianshuihai, Aksai Chin

By the end of the 1950s, in addition to having constructed a road, numerous PLA Ground Force outposts were constructed in a few locations, including at Tianwendian, Kongka Pass, Heweitan and Tianshuihai. The road was later upgraded to the China National Highway 219. In the modern day, there are a few businesses along the highway serving motorists.

In the 2010s, geological surveys were conducted in the Western Kunlun region, which Aksai Chin is part of. Huoshaoyun, a major lead-zinc deposit, and numerous smaller deposits were discovered in the region. Huoshaoyun is a mountain located in Aksai Chin near the Tibetan border. The mining development for Huoshaoyun started in 2017.

== Transportation ==
China National Highway 219 runs through Aksai Chin connecting Tibet (Ngari Prefecture) and Xinjiang (Hotan Prefecture).

In July 2022, Ministry of Transport of China published updated China National Highway Network Plan that includes China National Highway 695 which will go from Lhünzê Town, Lhünzê County, Tibet to Mazar Township, Yining County, Xinjiang travelling through Aksai Chin.

== See also ==
- Annexation of Tibet by the People's Republic of China
- Arunachal Pradesh
- Changtang
- Demchok sector
- Depsang Plains
- Ladakh
- List of locations in Aksai Chin
- Nelang
- Rutog County
- Shaksgam Valley
- Trans-Karakoram Tract
- 2013 Depsang standoff

== Bibliography ==
- Maxwell, Neville (1970), India's China War, Pantheon Books, ISBN 978-0-394-47051-1
- Mehra, Parshotam (1992), An "agreed" frontier: Ladakh and India's northernmost borders, 1846-1947, Oxford University Press, ISBN 9780195627589
- Woodman, Dorothy (1969), Himalayan Frontiers: A Political Review of British, Chinese, Indian, and Russian Rivalries, Praeger – via archive.org
- Sino-Indian Border Defenses Chushul Area (CIA, 1963)
