= Tourism in Ladakh =

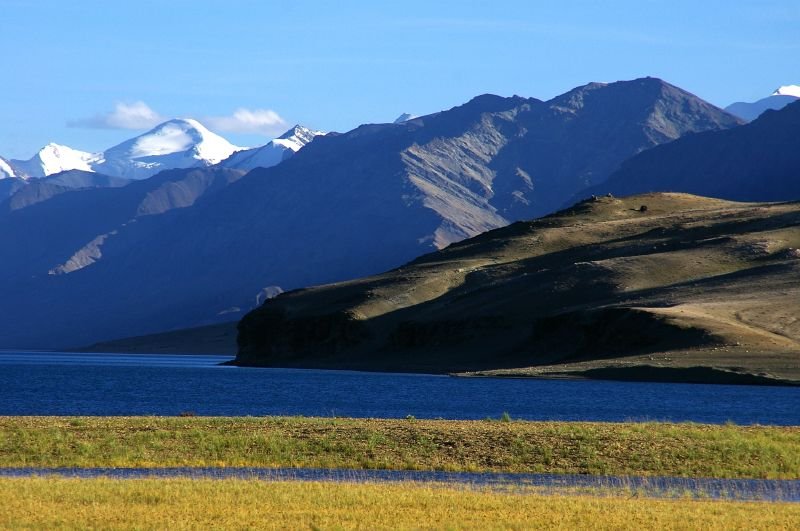
Ladakh landscape

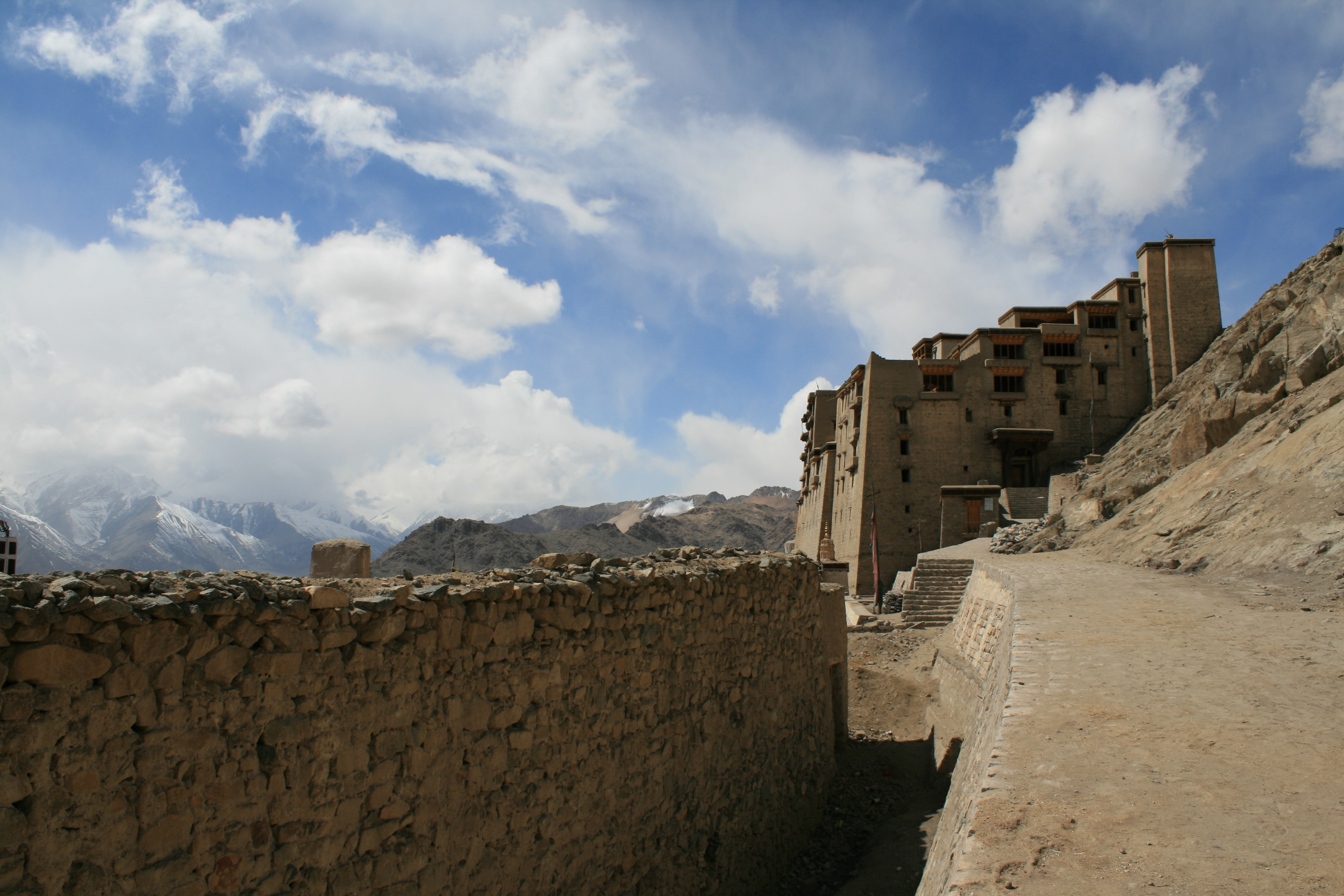
Leh Palace, Leh, Ladakh

Tourism is one of the economic contributors to the union territory of Ladakh in Northern India. This union territory is located between the Karakoram mountain range to the north and the Himalayas to the south, and is situated at a height of 11,400 ft (3,475 km). Ladakh is composed of Leh and Kargil districts. The region contains prominent Buddhist sites and has an ecotourism industry.

== Inner line permits ==
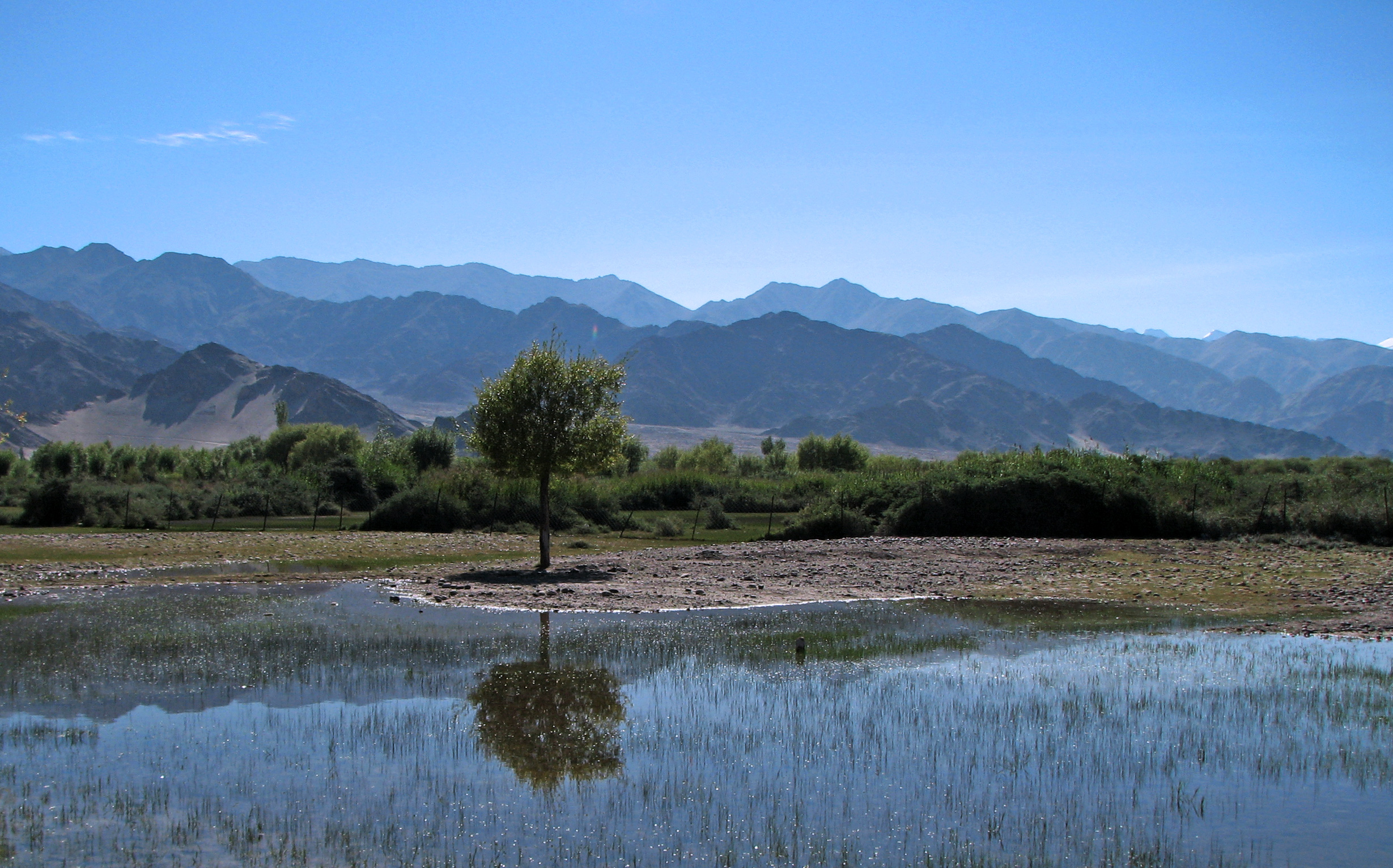
Farming in Leh Valley, Ladakh.

There are no open border crossings to the neighbouring Tibet Autonomous Region and Xinjiang, administered by China, or to Gilgit-Baltistan, administered by Pakistan.

No special permit is required to visit most of Ladakh, including Leh and Kargil towns.

Inner Line Permit (ILP), which can be obtained online, are required for all tourists to visit the "Inner Line" areas, the geostrategic restricted military border areas, such as Nubra Valley; Pangong Tso and Durbuk block (north of the Chang La pass); Tso-Moriri and Tso Kar lakes; Dah and Hanu villages; areas along the Indus River northwest of Khalatse and east of Upshi.

Foreigners can also obtain the permits for the restricted border areas, except they are not permitted in the specific border areas. Permits for foreigners are not available to go to the far reaches of each of the areas close to the LOC and LAC borders with Pakistan and China respectively. For example, foreigners can go to the edge of Pangong Lake and Maan and Merak villages, but not along the edge of it to Phobrang or Chushul villages; they cannot proceed east up the Indus from the Mahe bridge; and in Nubra they can only go as far as Panamik to the north and Turtuk to the west.

== Transport ==
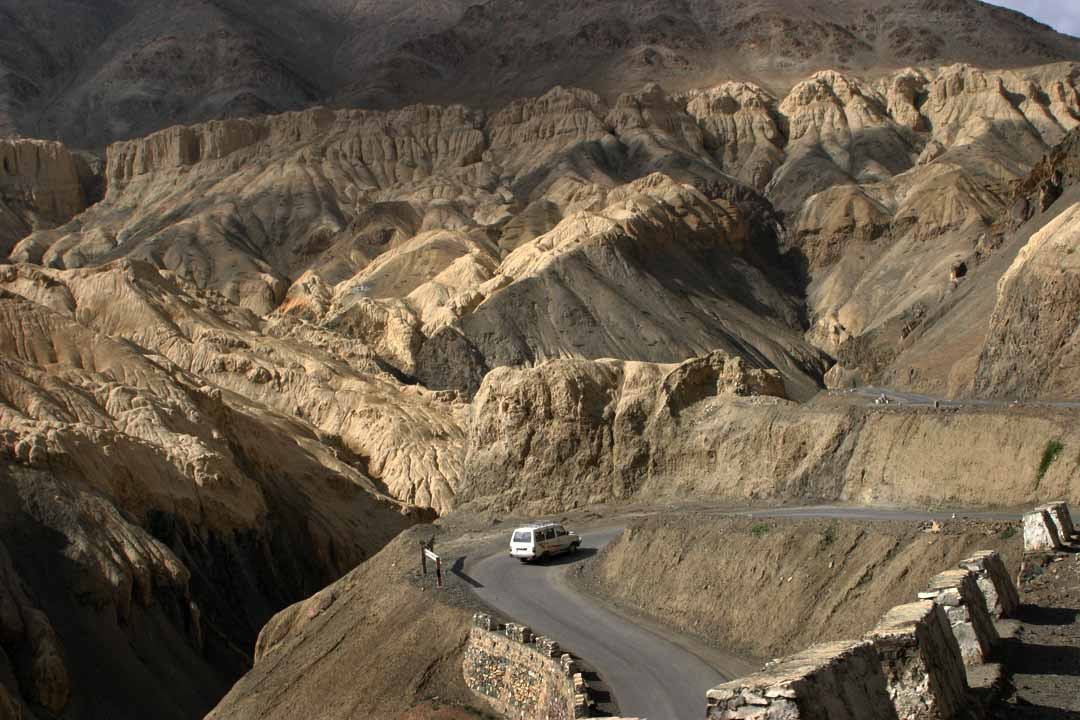
A vehicle on the Leh-Kargil highway

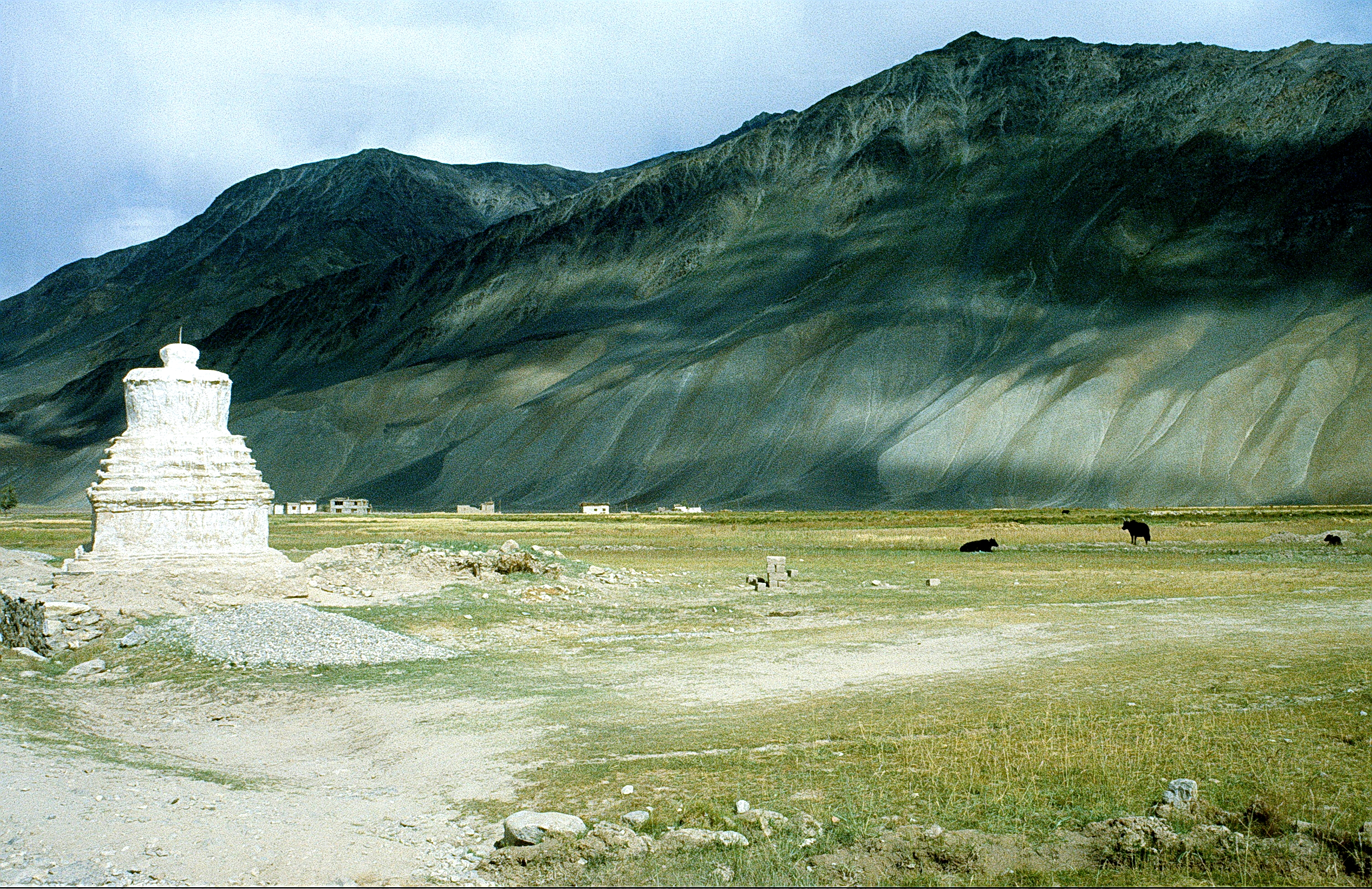
Near Padum, the Doda plain.

Kushok Bakula Rimpochee Airport at Leh has flights from Delhi year-round on Indigo, Vistara, GoFirst, and Air India. Air India also operates weekly flights to Jammu and Srinagar.

Bilaspur–Leh railway is under construction. The nearest railhead is Udhampur railway station connected with all major cities and towns in India.

The two roads into Ladakh from outside are the NH-1 Srinagar-Kargil-Leh Highway via Zoji La tunnel, and the high altitude Manali-Leh Highway via Atal Tunnel from Himachal Pradesh. Nimmu–Padum–Darcha road is a third road into Ladakh. Important roads within Ladakh are Nimmu–Padam–Darcha road, Chisumle-Demchok road, etc. Roads within Ladakh, except to Zangskar, are open all year round. Khardong-La Pass to Nubra can get closed by snow for several days in winter and spring. Chang-La pass to Pangong Lake rarely closes.

Buses serve the whole area from Leh and Kargil towns. Taxis are available in Leh and Kargil as well as in block headquarters like Tangtse, Diskit, and Khalsa. Shared taxis to Nubra, Kargil, Srinagar, and Zanskar leave Leh in the early morning.

== Tourist regions ==
Ladakh is subdivided in three regions: Western, Central and Eastern areas.

=== Western Area ===
Kargil, Drass, Sankoo and Zanskar are main towns in this region. Kargil, in Ladakh, offers a range of tourist attractions including historical sites, monasteries, and natural landscapes, making it a destination for adventure and cultural tourism. It's known for its stunning scenery, particularly the Suru Valley and the Nun-Kun peaks. Kargil is also a hub for adventure activities like trekking and white-water rafting.

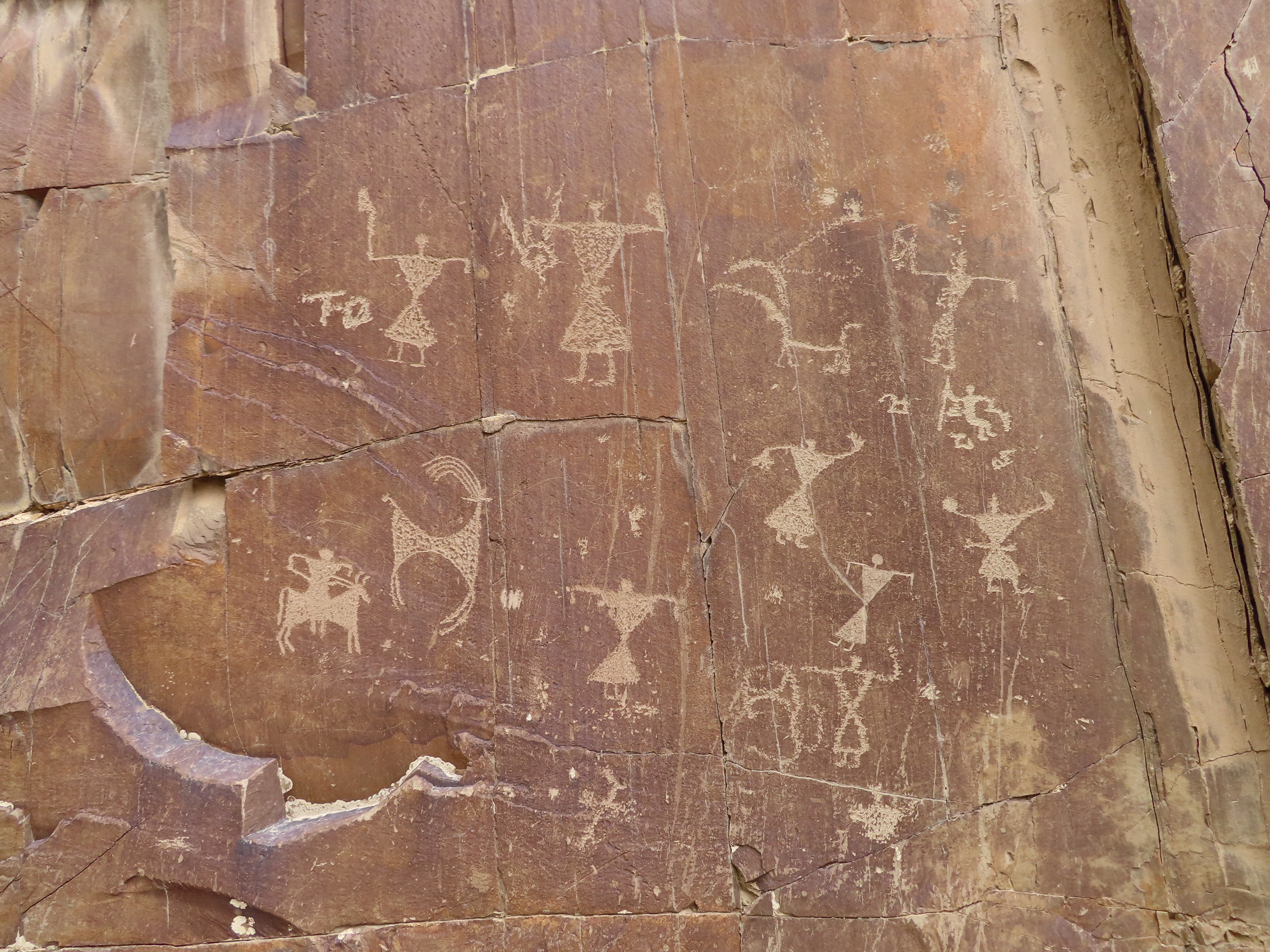
Ancient rock art along Sham valley

The Dras War Memorial is a memorial dedicated to the Kargil War. The Phugtal Monastery is a cave monastery in Zanskar, known for its architectural style and scenery. Suru Valley, a lush valley with green meadows and several streams, has panoramic views of the Nun and Kun peaks. The Nun-Kun Peaks are a common destination for trekkers and mountaineers. Rangdum Monastery is a well-known monastery with a rich history and spiritual significance. Mulbekh Monastery is a historical monastery located on a hilltop with views of the valley. Drang-Drung Glacier is a large glacier which is part of the vast Himalayan range. Sankoo Village, a village in Suru Valley, is a starting point for treks and a place to experience local culture. Panikhar is a village with eco-friendly accommodation options and opportunities for adventure activities.

In the northern areas, civilians and tourists are allowed to travel only up to Shyok village of Durbuk tehsil. It has geostrategic importance as it is the last Indian village on the 235 km long Darbuk–Shyok–DBO Road in the north which connects it to Daulat Beg Oldi (DBO) military post 225 km away on the China border. Syok to BDO area is also called Sub-Sector North (SSN) by the Indian Military. Sasoma–Saser La Road will provide alternative connectivity to DBO.

=== Central area ===
Chushul, where access by road is permitted without permit, lies in the north area of central Ladakh.

The Thikse Monastery is the largest monastery in central Ladakh.

=== Eastern area ===
Main areas are Karzok and Hanle. Travel from Hanley to Demchok is not permitted for the civilians and tourists, only army contractors are allowed with permission from the Indian Army.

== Tourist towns ==
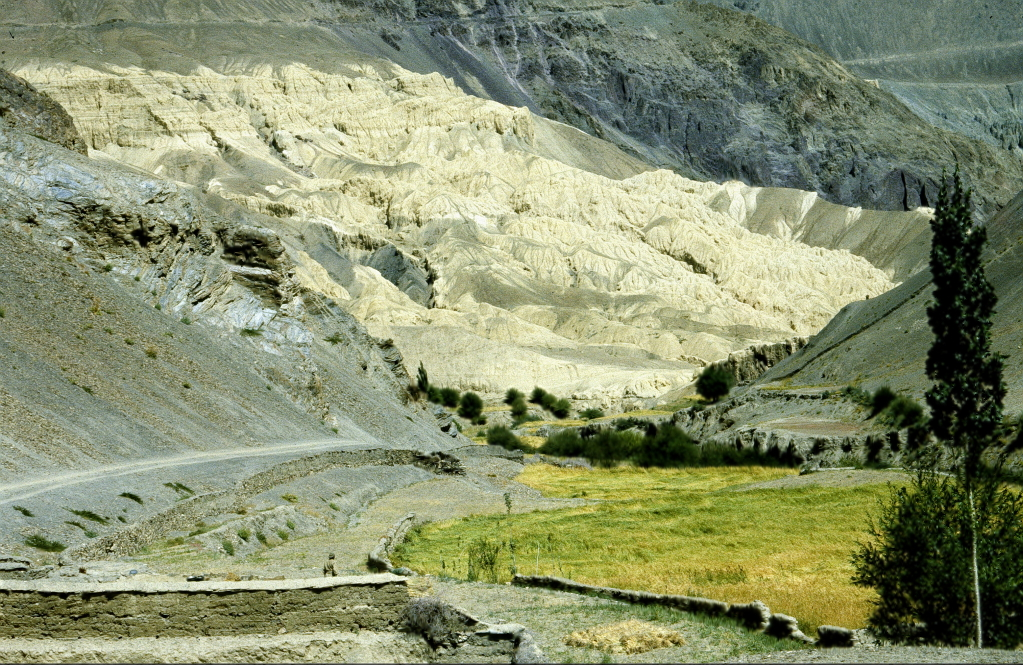
A farm in Lamayuru area.

Among the places of tourist interest include Leh, Drass valley, Suru valley, Kargil, Zangskar, Zangla, Rangdum, Padum, Phukthal, Sani Monastery, Stongdey, Shyok Valley, Sankoo, Salt Valley., Markha valley, Ladakh monastery trek, South Zangskar, Trans-Zangskar Expedition, Spiti to Ladakh, Spiti to Pitok to Hemis, Rupshu, the Great Salt lakes, Chadar Ice trek

=== Leh ===
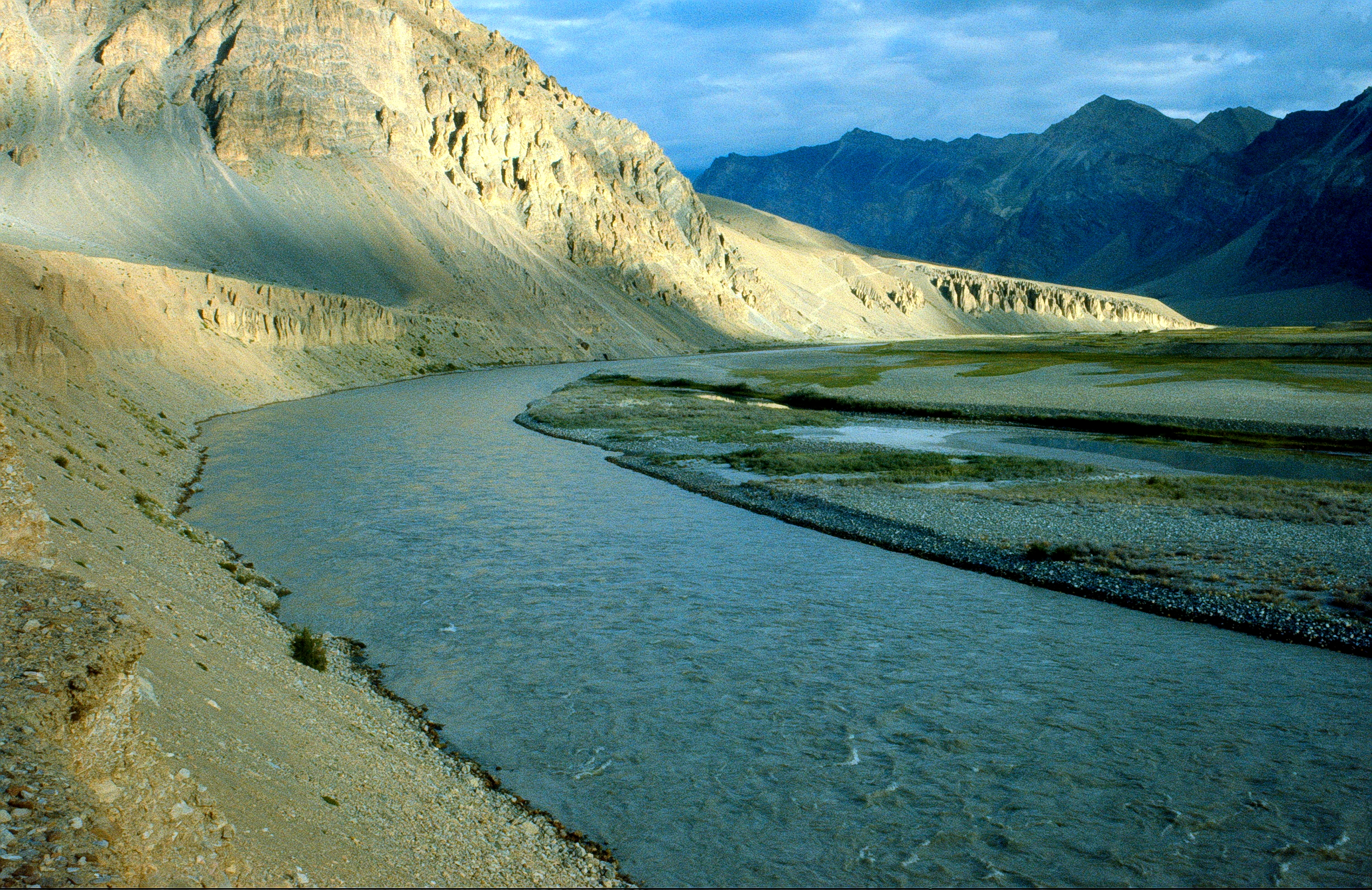
The Doda river to Zanskar river.

Leh is the capital of Ladakh. It has numerous tourist places including ancient palaces, monasteries, museums, war memorials and ecotourism. Just ahead of Leh Palace, the palace is the Chamba Temple, a shrine that has a large statue of Maitreya Buddha. In the bazaar, is the Jama Masjid painted green and white. Sankar Monastery welcomes a maximum of twenty monks at a time.

== Tourist roads ==
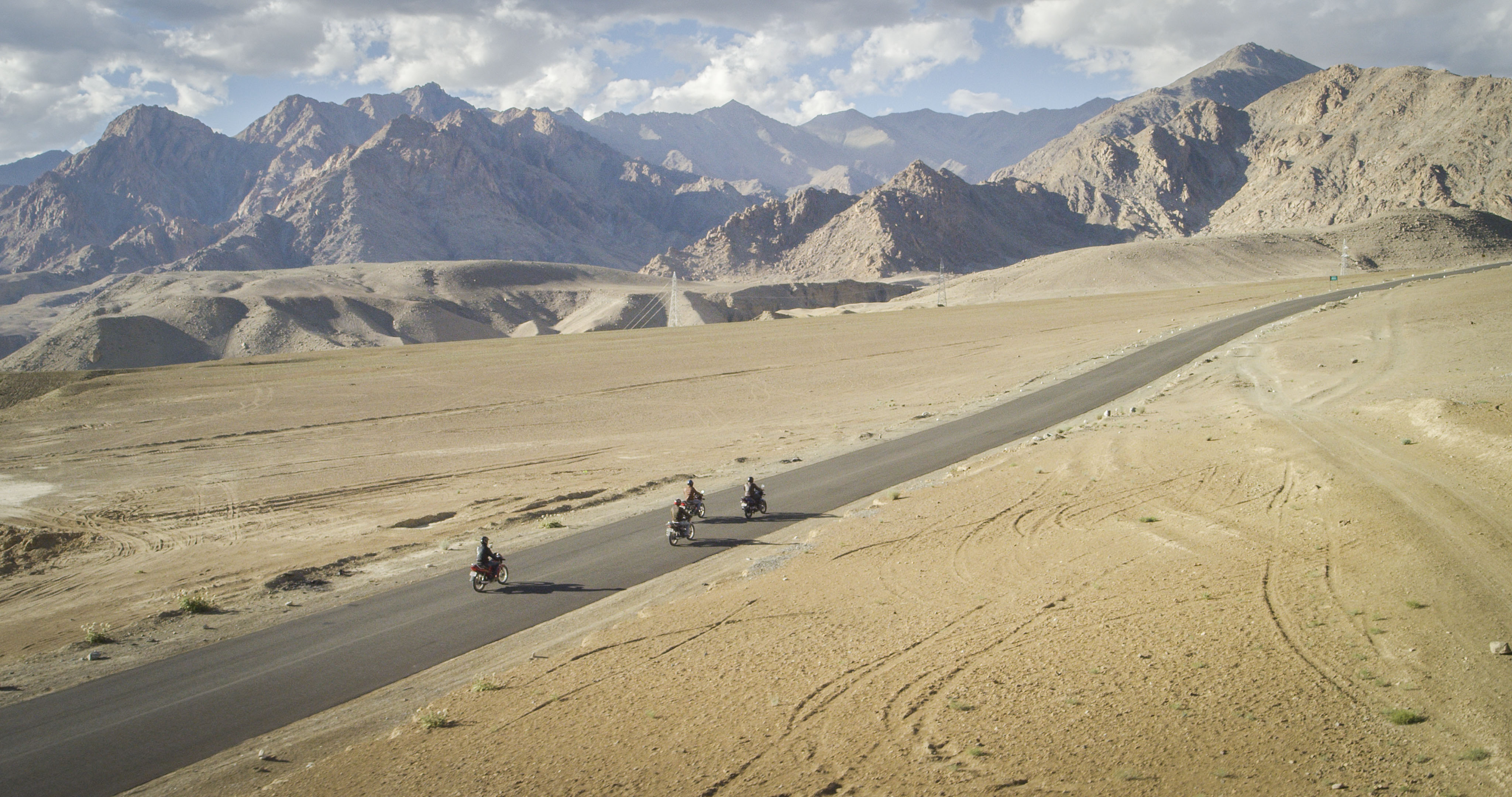
Ladakh is a popular destination for motorcyclists.

- Road access to Ladakh: These are 4 road routes to Ladakh which themselves are picturesque and touristic:
1. NH-1 Srinagar-Kargil-Leh: via Jammu and Kashmir
2. NH-3 Kullu-Keylong-Miroo-Leh: via Himachal Pradesh
3. Nimmu–Padum–Darcha road (Zanskar Highway): via Zanskar Valley.
4. Kiato-Karzok Road, connecting Kiato village (between Kiamo and Pangmo-Kaza in Spiti Valley in Himachal Pradesh, not to be confused with Key) in the south to the Karzok village (on the banks of Tso Morriri in Ladakh) in the north via the Takling La (5575 m or 18,290 ft, near the border of Ladakh, Himachal and Tibet), is a 125 km all-weather road being constructed by the BRO as another alternative route to Ladakh. After completing the initial survey, the BRO has invited the bids for preparing DPR for the road and the tunnel under the Takling La. It will connect the Karzok, Nurbo, Sumdo, Parangla and Kaza.
- Tourist Roads within Ladakh: Following road routes have been opened for the tourists by the Government of India (GoI) without requiring the ILP. All of these are located above the altitude of 14,000 ft:
1. "Merak-Loma Bend Road", starts from Merak on Pangong Tso, via Chushul, ends at Loma between Dungti & Hanle. Most of it is covered by the Chushule-Demchoke Highway.
2. "Chushul-Mahe Road" via Chushul, Kartsangla & Mahe.
3. "Durbuk-Hanle Road" from Durbuk-Shachu-Tharuk-Sato Kargyam-Parma-Erath-Chushul-Loma to Hanle.
4. "Agham-Shyok-Durbuk Road"
5. "Changchenmo-Tsogtsalu Road" (CTR), 55 km long from confluence of Changchenmo & Shyok rivers to Tsogtsalu.
6. "Phobrang-Marsimik La-Tsogtsalu-Hot Springs Road" (PMTHR) or "Marsimik La Road" (MLR) via Phobrang-Marsimik La-Tsogstsalu to Hot Springs.
- Some of other major touristic routes are:
1. "Hanuthang-Turtuk Road" (HT Road) or "Hanuthang-Handanbroke-Zungpal-Turtuk Road" (HHZT Road), 26.6 Km long greenfield road provides inter-valley connectivity across the Stakpuchan (Skurbuchan) Mountain Range from Hanuthang & Handanbroke in Indus Valley to Zungpal-Turtuk in Shyok Valley to the north. It will reduce Leh to Turtuk distance by 334 km and by 7 hours, from 395 km to 61 km or from existing 10 hours to 2 hours and 30 minutes, by bypassing the existing longer Khardung La route. Construction started in October 2021 and it was almost complete in December 2023.
2. "Kargil-Hambotingla-Batalik Road" (KHB Road) or "Kargil-Dumgil Road" (KD road), 50 km, includes construction of a tunnel at Hambotingla Kargil to Batalik. Upgrade of this touristic single-lane roads to national highway standard with paved shoulder started in October 2021.
3. "Batalik-Khalse Road" (BK Road), 78 km long road provides access to Yaldor Sub Sector and to east of Batalik the Aryan Valley tourist villages of Dah, Hanu, Garkone, Darchik, etc. Upgrade of this touristic single-lane roads to national highway standard with paved shoulder started in October 2021.
4. "Khalsar-Agham-Shyok Road" (KAS Road), 70 km. Upgrade of this touristic single-lane roads to national highway standard with paved shoulder started in October 2021.
5. "Tangtse-Lukung Road" (TL Road), 31 km, to Pangong Tso and Marsimik La. Upgrade of this touristic single-lane roads to national highway standard with paved shoulder started in October 2021.
6. "Lukung-Chartse Road" (LC Road), 32 km long road connects the northwest bank of Pangong Tso.
7. "Changchenmo-Tsogtsalu Road" (CTR), 55 km long: 55 km long road, from the confluence of Changchenmo & Shyok rivers to Tsogtsalu.
8. "Phobrang-Marsimik La-Tsogtsalu-Hot Springs Road" (PMTHR) or "Marsimik La Road" (MLR) in Changchenmo Range, via Phobrang & Marsimik La is a motorable black-topped road which runs east of Pangong Tso. It also provides access to the "Finger-4 Road".
9. "Finger-4 Road" (F4R), is a black top motorable road till "Finger-4" on the northern bank of the Pangong Tso, being built by India which will be completed by 2025.
10. "Surtok-Kakstet-Chushul Road" (CKC road), parallel to the southern bank of Pangong Tso, provides shortest route from Spangmik, Man & Merak to Chushul.
11. Sasoma–Saser La Road: Sasoma–Sasser La-Saser Brangsa-Gapsam-Daulat Beg Oldi Road (SSSG-DBO Road) 131 km long road through 17,800 feet (5,400 m) high Saser La, and its 18-km-long northwest-to-southeast fork the Sasser Brangsa-Murgo Road (SBM Road).
12. "Chushul-Dungti-Fukche-Demchok highway" (CDFD road), along the southern bank of Indus river which marks the LAC, will be converted to a single-lane 7.45 m wide 135 km long national highway with paved shoulder by 31 March 2025. Chushul and Fukche Airstrips lies along this highway. It will also provide faster access to the Nyoma airbase. This will boost military logistics and tourism in the border area.
13. "Mahe-Chushul Road" (MCR), via Kartsangla, will be completed by the BRO by December 2023 (August 2023 update).
14. "Likaru-Mig La-Fukche Road" (LMLF Road), through 19,400 ft Mig La, commencement of construction was announced by the BRO on 15 August 2023. After the completion, it will overtake the "Chisumle-Demchok Road" (via Umling La, 19,300 ft) to become the highest motorable road in the world. Road via Umling La already passes at a height higher than the base camp of world's tallest mountain, the Mount Everest.
15. "Chismule-Koyul-Umling La-Demchok Road" (CKUD Road): A new 86 km long road from Chismule in the Koyul Lungpa valley to Demchok was constructed by the Border Roads Organisation in 2017, via the Umling La pass (32.6964°N 79.2842°E) at a height of 19,300 ft (5,900 m). This road connects Demchok to Koyul, Hanle and other places in Ladakh. The Border Roads Organisation claims it is the "world's highest motorable road", a title earlier, incorrectly, accorded to Khardung La road at 17,600 ft.
16. "Hanle-Fukche-Koyul-Demchok Road" (HFKD Road) was constructed by BRO, which runs via Koyul.
17. "Koyul-Chisumle-Zursar Road" (KCZ Road) was completed by December 2023.
18. "Hanle-Kaza-Tabo Road" (HKT Road) is being constructed by the BRO under Indo-China Border Roads (ICBR) scheme.
19. "Hanle-Zursar-Imis La Road" (HZI Road) was completed by December 2023.
20. "Chumathang-Chushul Road" (CC Road) was completed by December 2023.
21. Nimmu–Padum–Darcha road

== Trekking routes ==
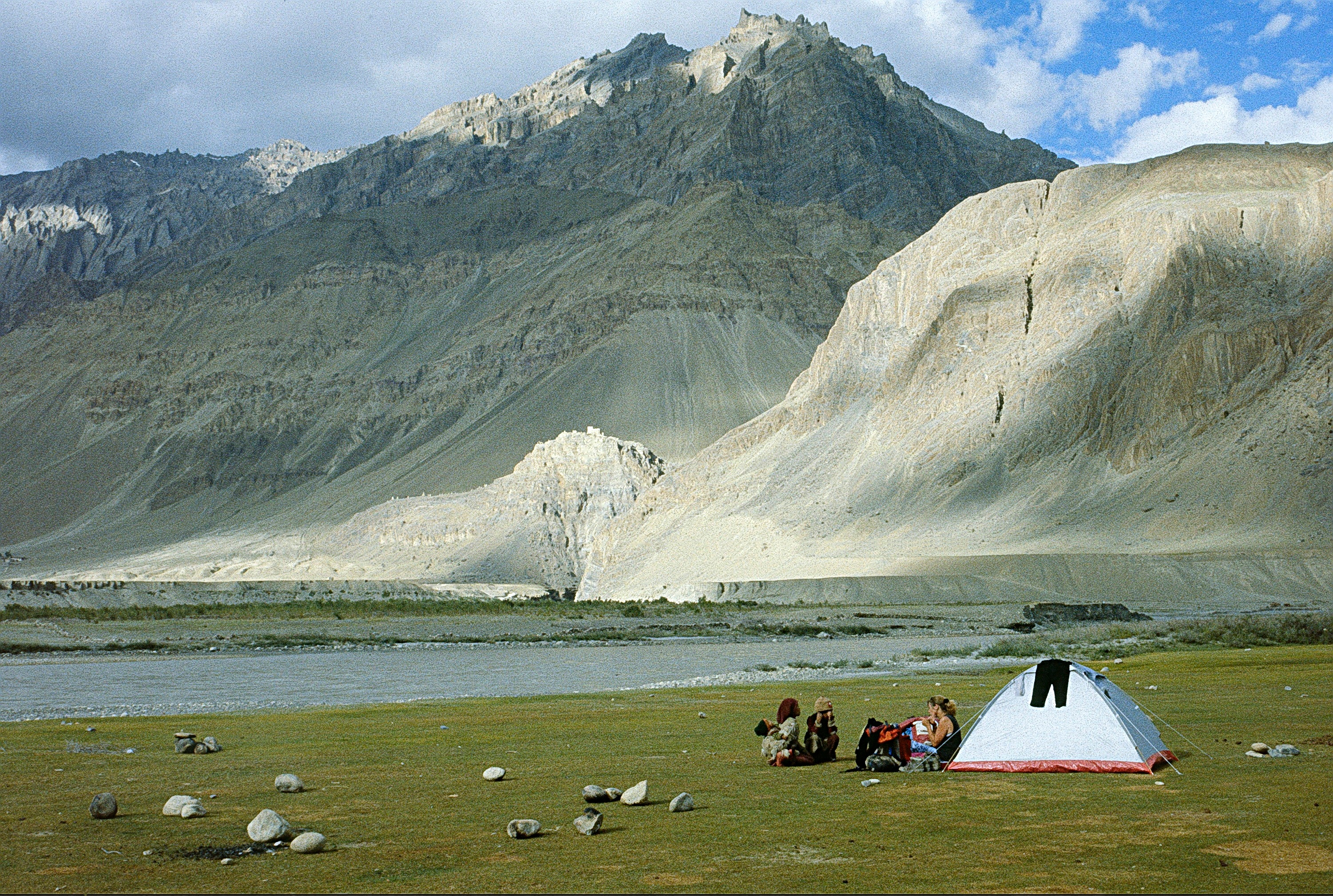
Zanskar River camping.

Treks include Manali to Ladakh, the Nubra valley, Pangong tso, Tso moriri, the Indus Valley, Markha Valley, Ladakh monastery trek, South Zangskar, Trans-Zangskar Expedition, Spiti to Ladakh, Spiti to Pitok to Hemis, Rupshu, the Great Salt lakes - name given to lakes on Changthang plateau, Chadar trek (part of Nimmu–Padum–Darcha road, Other treks are Padum-Manali, Padum-Phuktal, Padam-Darcha, Panikhar-Heniskot, Lamayuru-Martselang, Lamayuru-Alchi, Kala Pattar trek, and Pahal.

In 2018, following 4 trails with night stay in Ladakh were opened for the tourists by the Government:

1. Phyang-Dokla-Hunderdok track
2. Temisgam-Largyap-Panchathank-Skuru track
3. Basgo-Ney-Hunderdok-Hunder track
4. Suspol-Saspochy-Rakurala-Skuru track

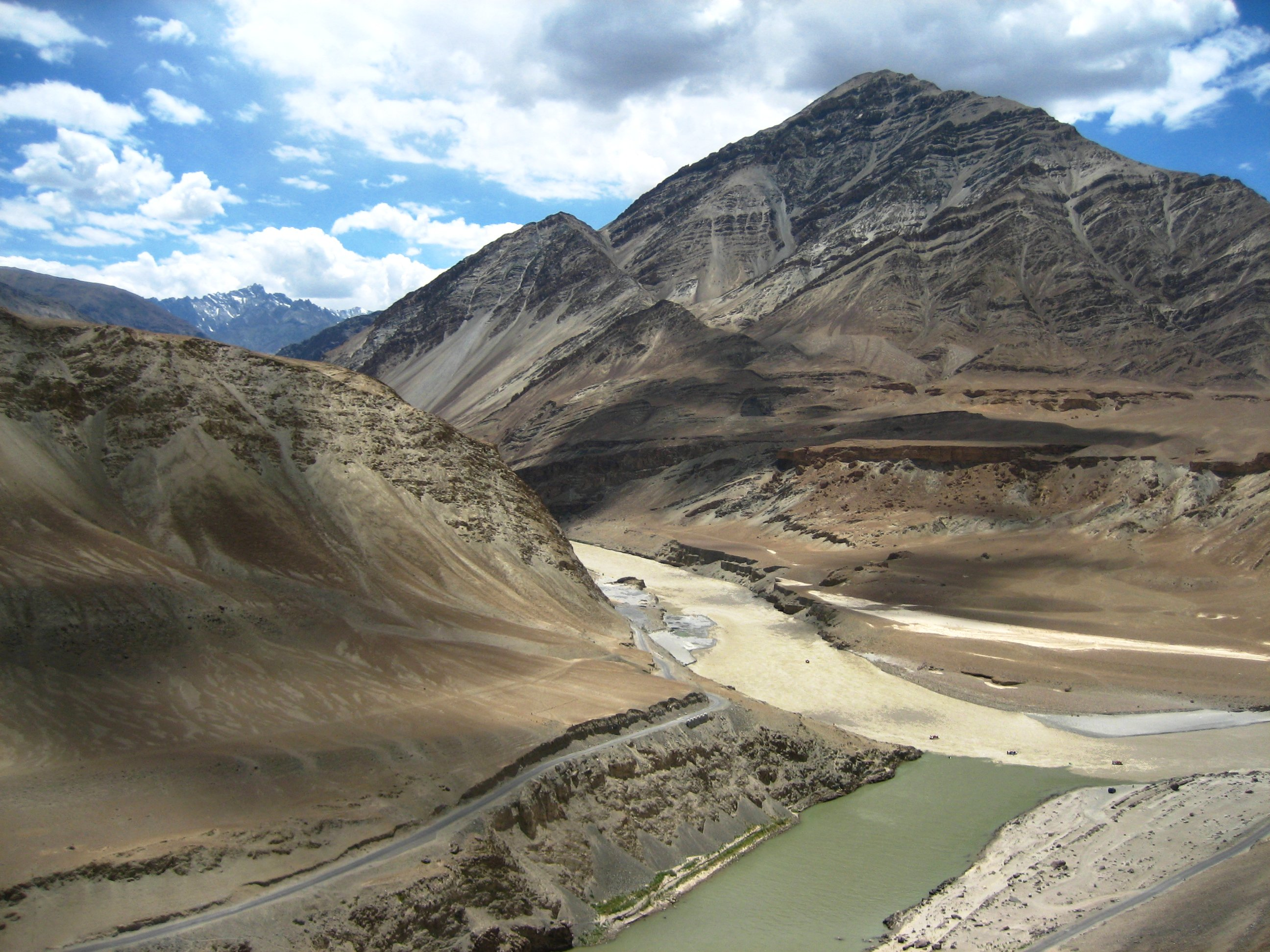
Zanskar River and Indus River confluence, in Ladakh.

== Adventure tourism ==
Ladakh, with rugged terrain having some of the tallest peaks and highest mountain passes of the world, offers several opportunities for adventure tourism.

Extreme adventure at Siachen Base Camp and Kumar Post is an army-run 30-day annual expedition for the medically fit civilians below the age of 45 from Siachen Base Camp to Kumar Base (16,000 ft), Indira Ridge, Indira Col (extreme northwestern point of India administered area) and other features,

Rafting is available in summers at various places, along Indus river and its tributaries, such as Chiling Sumda on the Zanskar River.

== Astrotourism ==
- Hanle: Indian Astronomical Observatory (IAO)

== Buddhist monasteries ==
There are numerous Buddhist monasteries managed by the All Ladakh Gonpa Association (ALGA) along the banks of various rivers of Indus River basin spread across the region. The area thrives on donations made by tourists and the local people of the region but now the government plans to develop these monasteries. The state government also plans to hire experts for landscaping of the barren regions and such a move was possible only after the Centre released funds.

About 65 km west of Leh, towards Zanskar River, is the village of Sumda Chun at height of 3500 mtr. The monastery of Sumda-Chun is one of the most important surviving early Tibetan Buddhist temples of the Ladakh region.

== Buddha Chamba: cliff-rock-cut giant statues of Maitreya Buddha ==
Three rock cut relief statues of Maitreya Buddhas (the Buddha who will be incarnated in the future, also called the "chamba" in local language) dating to 1 century BCE to 6th century CE, predating Tibetan Buddhism and 6th century Buddhas of Bamiyan of Afghanistan, were found carved in the riverine cliffs in the following 3 different locations in Ladakh. Since Taliban have already destroyed the Bamiyan Buddhas in Afghanistan, very few such relic remain, these ancient Buddha statues in Ladakh in India still survive.

1. "Apati Chamba statue", ? tall, at Apati 16 km east of Kargil on "Kargil-Batalik Road",
2. "Mulbekh Chamba statue",7 m (23 ft) tall, adjacent to Mulbekh Monastery 36 km southeast of Kargil on " NH-1 Kargil-Leh Road",
3. "Khartse Khar Chamba statue", 9 m (30 ft) tall, at Khartse Khar 47 km south of Kargil on "Kargil-Sankoo-Barsoo-Khartse Khar Road" in Suru River valley in Zanskar.

=== Mulbekh Maitreya Buddha statue ===
The 9-meter-tall (30 ft) "Mulbekh Maitreya Buddha statue" or "Mulbekh Chamba" in Gandhara art, dating back to 8th century CE Kushan Empire period, at Mulbekh village 38 km Kargil from on Kargil-Leh NH1 highway is visible from the highway. A gompa at its feet was built in 1975. The statue has several arms which "carry leaves in one hand, a string of beads in another, a kamandal in a third, and pointed towards the earth with a fourth."

=== Khartse Khar Maitreya Buddha statue ===
The 7-meter-tall (23 ft) 7th-8th century "Khartse Khar Buddha statue" or "Khartse Khar Chamba" carved in greyish-yellow rock face on a cliff is 48 km from Kargil on Kargil-Sankoo-Barsoo road. Sankoo is 42 km from Kargil, then the Barsoo road further 4.6 km leads east to the statue on the road side in Khartse Khar village on the bank of Suru River. "The holes around it suggested that scaffolding had been used to reach the face and carve out the finer details. The Buddha formed an abhayamudrā (gesture of fearlessness) with his right hand, while the left hand carried a kamandal (pot to carry water). I noticed a rudraksha mala (prayer beads) tied around the wrist and the arm, as well as the janeu (sacred thread) and the karadhani (waist chain), also made out of rudraksha. Although knotted, the statue’s hair fell over his shoulders."

=== Apati Maitreya Buddha statue ===
The "Apati Maitreya Buddha statue" or "Apati Chamba", on a cobbled pathway at Apati village is 16 to 22 km from Kargil on Kargil-Batalik road. Among the 3 statues in Kargil district, it is the shortest in size and nearest to Kargil town. It has a rudraksha necklace and carries the kamandal.

== Buddhist cave art ==
Saspol Caves, situated 76 km northwest of Leh between Khalsi & Nimmoo on NH-1 Kargil-Leh Road in the hills behind Suspol, is rare early period painted cave temples of Ladakh dated to the 15th century CE. The caves, also known as Gon-Nila-Phuk Cave temples, are in danger of total collapse and listed in 2016 World Monuments Watch. Paintings existing in five caves, cave with painted red exterior is the main cave with rare paintings of Anuttarayoga Tantra.

== Early pre-historic rock art ==
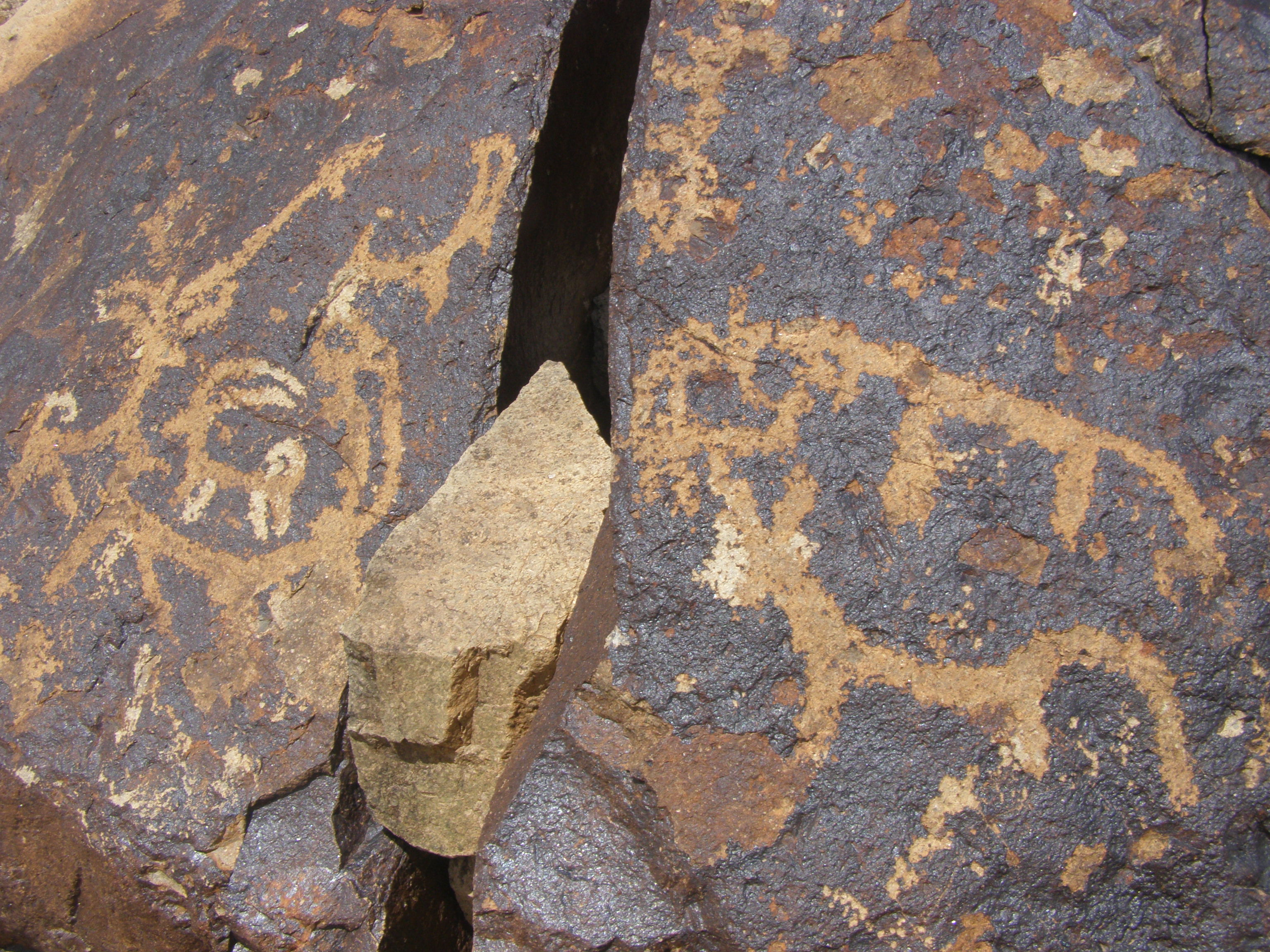
Petroglyphs in Ladakh, India

Ladakh has several petroglyphs dating back 5000 years to Iron Age, Bronze Age, Kushan period (30–375 CE), and as recent as 15th century. French National Centre for Scientific Research (CNRS) has found several thousand rock paintings across more than 400 rock carving sites.

"Rock art in Ladakh comprises carvings or incisions on rock surfaces that are called petroglyphs which display a very wide range of themes and motifs, and provide crucial information about Ladakh’s prehistory about which very little is yet known, The rock art of Ladakh, whilst concentrated around the Indus River and its tributaries, is represented in all parts of Ladakh and Kargil districts, including Zanskar, Changthang and Nubra. However, the rock art of Ladakh at several locations is under severe risk of damage and outright destruction though road, housing and other development projects, and we are confident that the establishment of RAU will play a key role with other interested organisations, to create local community level awareness and ownership of this precious cultural heritage."

== Ecotourism and national parks ==
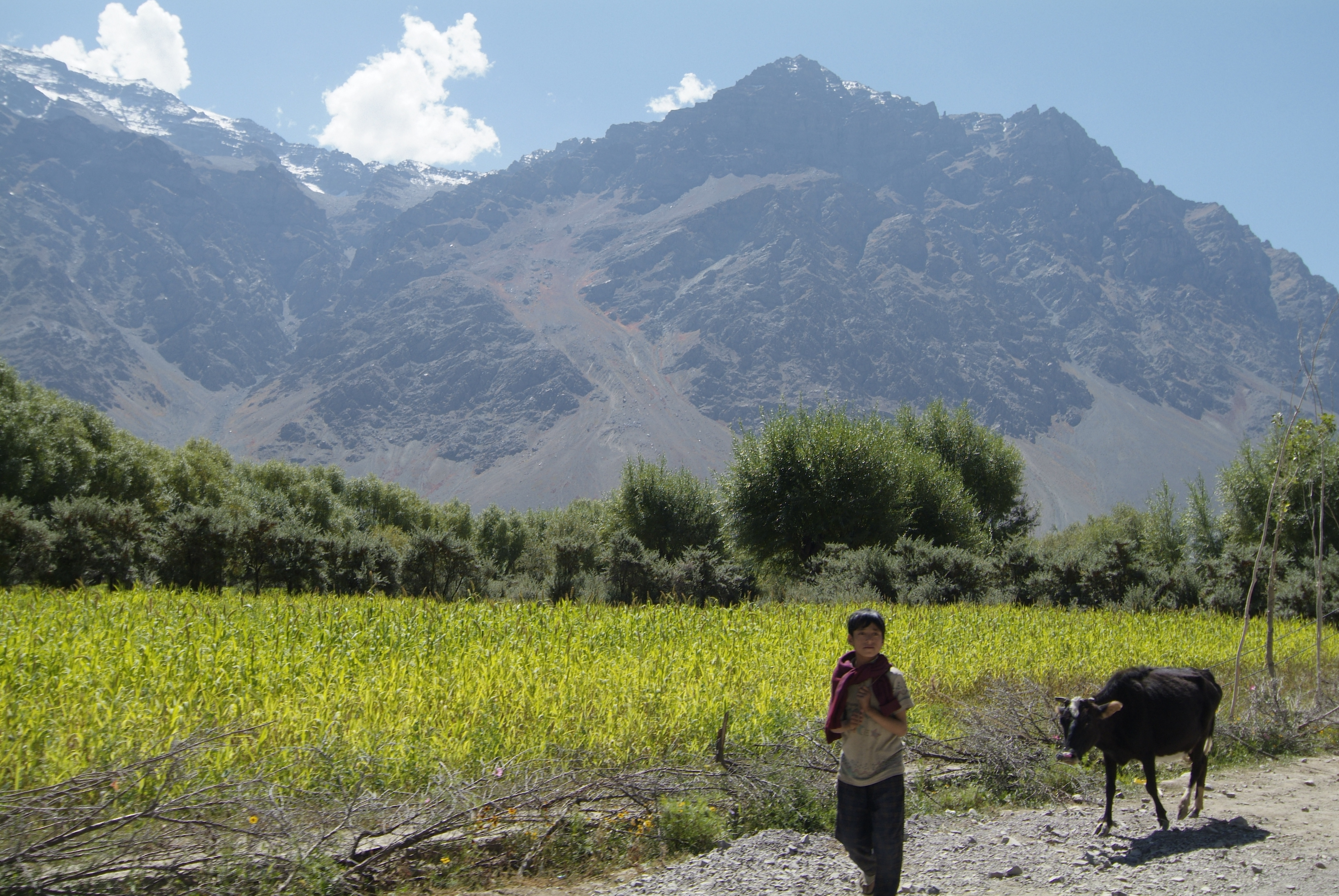
Farming in Suru Valley, Ladakh.

Ladakh to home to exotic wildlife including snow leopards, Himalayan brown bear, etc. Hemis National Park, Changthang Cold Desert Wildlife Sanctuary, Karakorum Wildlife Sanctuary are protected wildlife areas of Ladakh. The Mountain Institute, Ladakh Ecological Development Group and Snow Leopard Conservancy work on "Ecotourism Opportunities in Rural Ladakh". The ecotourism has been introduced in Ladakh by non-governmental organizations and individuals like Helena Norberg-Hodge and Thinlas Chorol.

== Festivals ==
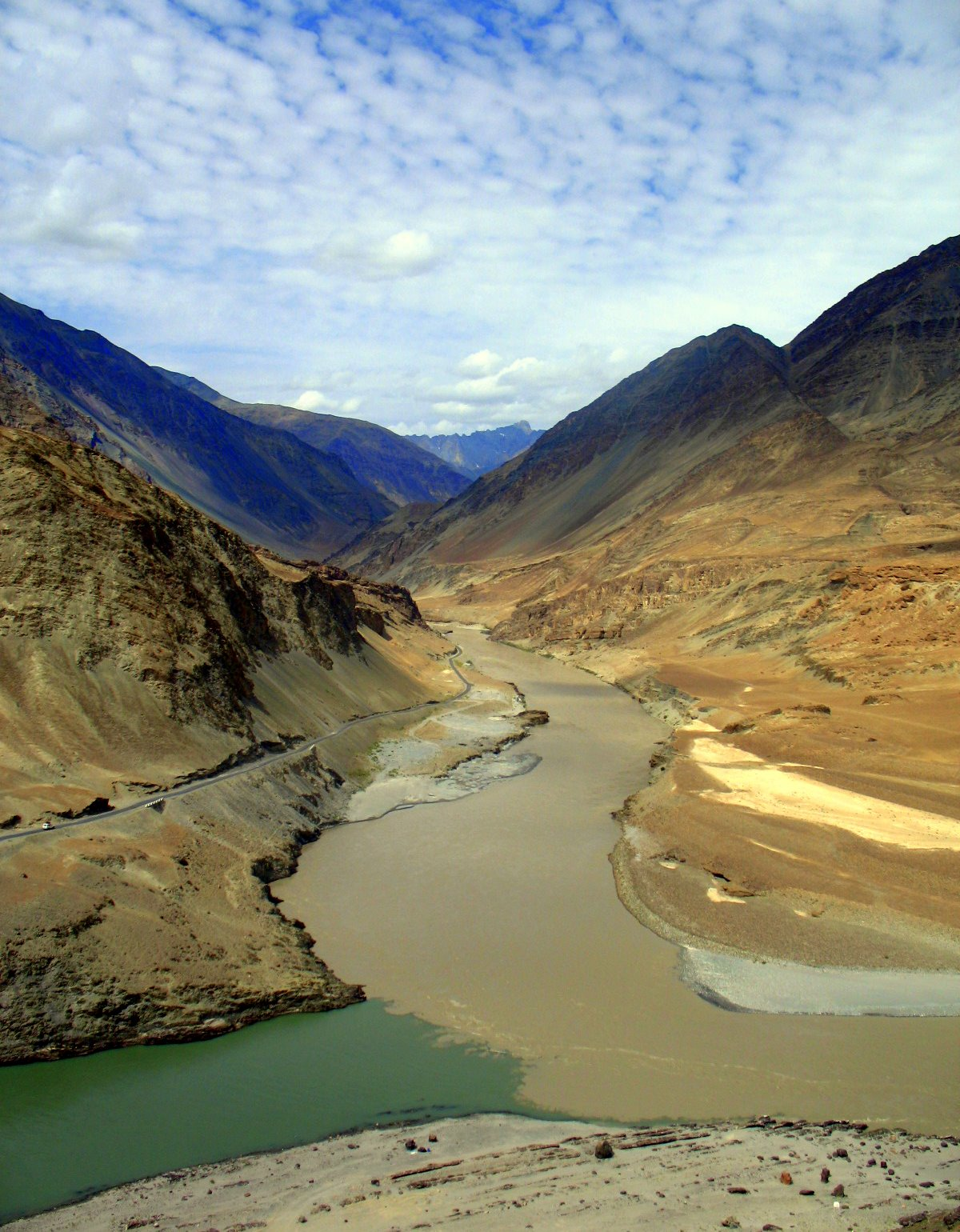
Sindhu Pushkaram takes pace at the confluence of Indus River and silt-laden Zanskar River.

Following major festivals and events are celebrated:

- Feb
  - Dosmoche festival celebrated in Leh Palace, Leh, Likir and Diskit monasteries.
  - Pangong Frozen Lake Marathon (PFLM), is held by India in February to promote winter tourism at Pangong Tso.
- Feb-March
  - Stok Guru Tsechu, a major annual two-day monastic festival celebrated in Stok 15-20 km south of Leh held on the 9th and 10th day of the first month of the Tibetan lunar calendar, typically falling in February or March.
  - Losar Buddhist new year festival around March is held all over Ladakh.
  - Matho Nagrang Oracle Festival, commemorates two oracles who rejoin society on this day after 2 months long meditation.
- May-June
  - Saka Dawa, celebrates the birth and enlightenment of Sakyamuni and his entry to nirvana, falls between the end of May and the end of June.
- June-July
  - Sindhu Darshan Festival, annual 3 days tourism festival at Leh in June.
  - Sindhu Pushkaram festival, Hindu festival held every 12 years at confluence of Indus and Zanskar River at Nimoo for 12 days starting from when Jupiter enter into the constellation of (Aquarius).
  - Ladakh International Film Festival (LIFF), held annually in June or July.
  - Hemis Festival, dedicated to Padmasambhava (Guru Rinpoche) is held around July.
- July-August
  - Phyang Tsedup Festival (Gang-Sngon Tsedup Festival) is celebrated at the Phyang Monastery around July-August, monks dress up in sacred silk robes and offer prayers. Sacred dance-dramas are performed keeping in mind themes such as the victory of good over evil.
  - Tak Tok Festival (Takthok Tsechu)
- August
  - Great Tibetan Marathon (traditional spiritual event): Starts with Tibetan long horns blessed by monks, ran from Hemis Monastery to Spituk Gompa.
- September
  - Ladakh Harvest Festival, organized by Ladakh Tourism in September showcases regional heritage through traditional masked dances (Cham), folk music, archery, and polo matches, bringing communities together to celebrate agricultural achievements.
  - Ladakh Marathon (modern event): Large-scale international event with thousands of participants from 30+ countries. One of world's toughest high-altitude run, featuring the 72km Khardung La Challenge and the 122km Silk Route Ultra. Across the border in Tibet, China holds the annual "The Roof of the World Marathon" in May.
- December
  - Galdan Namchot, traditional buddhist festival which commemorates the birth and parinirvana (death) and the Buddhahood of Je Tsongkhapa (1357–1419 AD).

== Fossils ==
Fossils at Burtse are well-preserved marine fossils, "including gastropods (snail-like mollusks), bivalves (shellfish) and foraminifera (microscopic organisms)" from the Eocene epoch (56 to 33.9 million years ago) found in Burtse area at 16,000 feet altitude above sea level. Burtse was under the Tethys Sea when Indian continent broke away from the African continent and slid under the Eurasian Plate. This caused the formation of Himalayas 40 million years ago by folding of mountains by the "tectonic forces that lifted these sediments from a near-coastal marine environment to these heights. The floor of Tethys thrust up, that is why we find ophiolites (oceanic crust) in Ladakh."

== Hot springs ==
Puga Hot springs

.

- Upshi-Nyoma Road
  - Chumathang hot springs.
  - Puga hot springs east of Tso Kar lake on ""Meroo-Tso Kar-Mahe road"".
- Siachen
  - Panamik hot springs, near Sasoma.
- Darbuk–Shyok–DBO Road (DS-DBO Road)
  - Murgo Hotspring
- LAC
  - Hot Springs, Chang Chenmo Valley
  - Gogra Hot Springs, Changlung Valley
- Jianan Pass – a border pass in the Kugrang Valley, sometimes called "Hot Springs".
- Demchok sector
  - Demchok Hot Spring

== Lakes ==
Major and popular lakes are:

- India-China LAC: Pangong Tso & Spanggur Tso
- Changthang plateau: Tso Kar, Startsapuk Tso, Kyagar Tso, Tso Moriri, Chilling Tso, Ryul lake.
- Chumathang area: Yaya Tso and Mirpal Tso on ""Chumathang-Chushul Road"".
- Nubra: Yarab Tso

== Museums ==
- Kargil
  - Harka Bahadur Memorial Museum
  - Hunderman–Museum of Memories in Hunderman Boq on LoC 10 km from Kargil.
  - Munshi Aziz Bhat Museum of Central Asian and Kargil Trade Artefacts in Kargil city.
- Leh
  - Central Asian Museum at Leh, next to main market in Leh town.
  - Hall of Fame museum, 4 km west of Leh centre on Leh-Kargil Road, war memorial and military museum.
  - Ladakh Rocks and Minerals Museum, Leh
  - Ladakh Arts and Media Organisation, below Namgyal Palace, Old Town, Leh.
  - Stok Palace and Museum
  - Textile Museum of Ladakh, next to polo ground in Leh.
- Turtuk: Balti Heritage House and Museum

== War memorials ==
- Kargil:
  - Kargil Vijay Diwas Memorial: Kargil city.
  - Harka Bahadur Memorial Museum. See also Battle of Tololing and Battle of Tiger Hill.
- Leh:
  - Hall of Fame museum, 4 km west of Leh centre on Leh-Kargil Road, war memorial and military museum.
- LAC
  - Chushul region:
    - Rezang La War Memorial, Tasaka La Road between Chushul & Dungti.
  - Chang Chenmo River
    - Chang Chenmo Hot Springs Police War Memorial, see also 1959 Kongka Pass incident.
  - Galwan River
    - Galwan War Memorial, Galwan Valley. See also 2020–2021 China–India skirmishes.

== See also ==
- Geography of Ladakh
- India-China Border Roads
- List of districts of Ladakh
- Tourism in India
- Inner Line Permit (ILP), mandatory to obtain to visit certain border areas.
- Tourism infrastructure
  - Geography of Ladakh
  - List of districts of Ladakh
  - List of mountain peaks of Ladakh
  - List of mountain passes in Ladakh
  - List of Indian states and territories by highest point
- Borders
  - With Pakistan
    - AGPL: Actual Ground Position Line, India-Pakistan border across Siachen region.
    - LOC: Line of Control, India-Pakistan border across Ladakh and Jammu and Kashmir.
    - Siachen Base Camp
  - With Tibet
    - LAC Line of Actual Control, India-China border across Ladakh.
    - India-China Border Roads
- Conflicts
  - Indo-Pakistani wars and conflicts
    - Siachen conflict
    - Siachen Glacier
  - Sino-Indian War
