= Phobrang =

- village
- Location within Ladakh Location within India
- Coordinates: 34°2′57″N 78°26′33″E
- Country: India
- Union Territory: Ladakh
- District: Leh district
- Tehsil: Tangtse

Area
  - Total: 3.16 sq mi (8.19 km^{2})
- Elevation: 14,500 ft (4,400 m)
- Postal code: 194201

Phobrang is a settlement in the Indian union territory of Ladakh. It is near Lukung on the way the Indo-China border at the Hot Springs. It is the last village of Ladakh in this direction, at an elevation of 14,500 feet (4,400 m).

Phobrang is in the Leh district, Tangtse tehsil. It is the headquarters of a Halqa Panchahat (village administration), which covers the entire Pangong Tso region of Ladakh till Man Pangong. Phobrang was apparently lightly populated in the 19th century, but, at present, there is a small residential area, along with numerous semi-nomadic camping grounds, grazing grounds and farmlands, situated in an alluvial plain watered by a river flowing from the north. There is a Green Himalayas project under way to convert Phobrang to an eco-tourism site.

The 84 km-long Marsimik La Road from Lukung to Hot Springs passes through Phobrang. There is also a 40 km-long road from Phobrang to Chartse on the north bank of Pangong Tso. Both these roads are meant for mainly military use.
