= Merak, Ladakh =

Village in Ladakh, India

Merak
- Location in Ladakh Merak (India)
- Coordinates: 33°47′50.535″N 78°35′28.356″E
- Country: India
- Union Territory: Ladakh
- Territory: Ladakh
- District: Leh district
- Postal code: 194201

Merak is a village on the southern banks of Pangong Tso, near Spangmik on the south India-China border in the Leh District, Ladakh.

== Location ==
Merak is situated 176 kilometers east of Leh, on the southern banks of Pangong Tso. It is directly opposite to Finger 3 which is located on the northern bank of the lake.

== History ==
In 2018, a telescope was installed to study solar chromosphere at Indian Astronomical Observatory, Merak. The village is also the proposed site for National Large Solar Telescope (NLST), a Gregorian multi-purpose open telescope. Stable Auroral Red (SAR) arcs were observed in Merak in November 2023 and during the May 2024 solar storms.

In 2021, the village got its first tap water supply. Also, BSNL, a state-run telecom service provider got approval from Indian Army for a 25-km optical fibre cable link between Merak and Chushul for civilian telecom traffic.

== Gallery ==
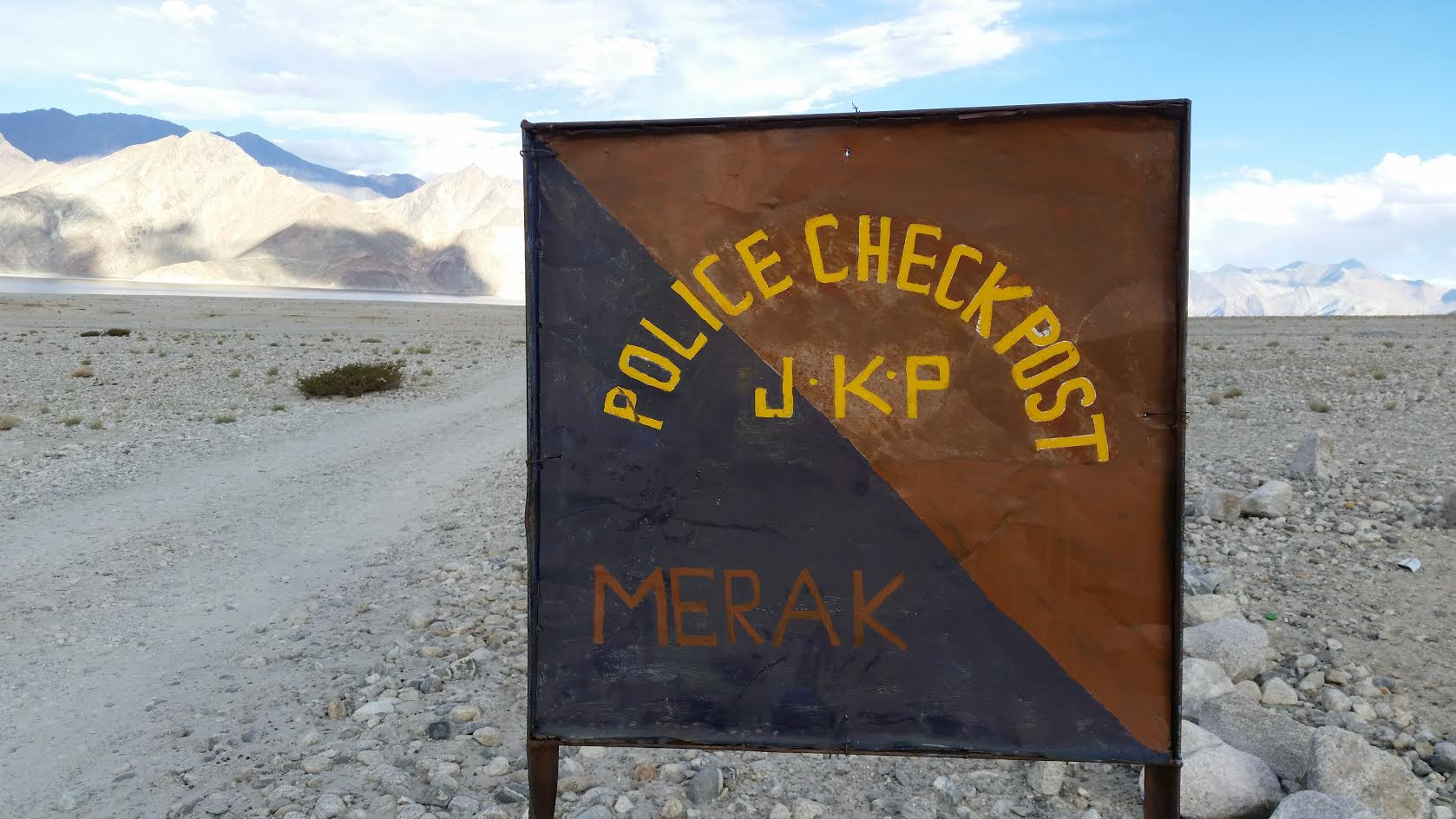
Police check-post, Jammu and Kashmir Police (October 2016)

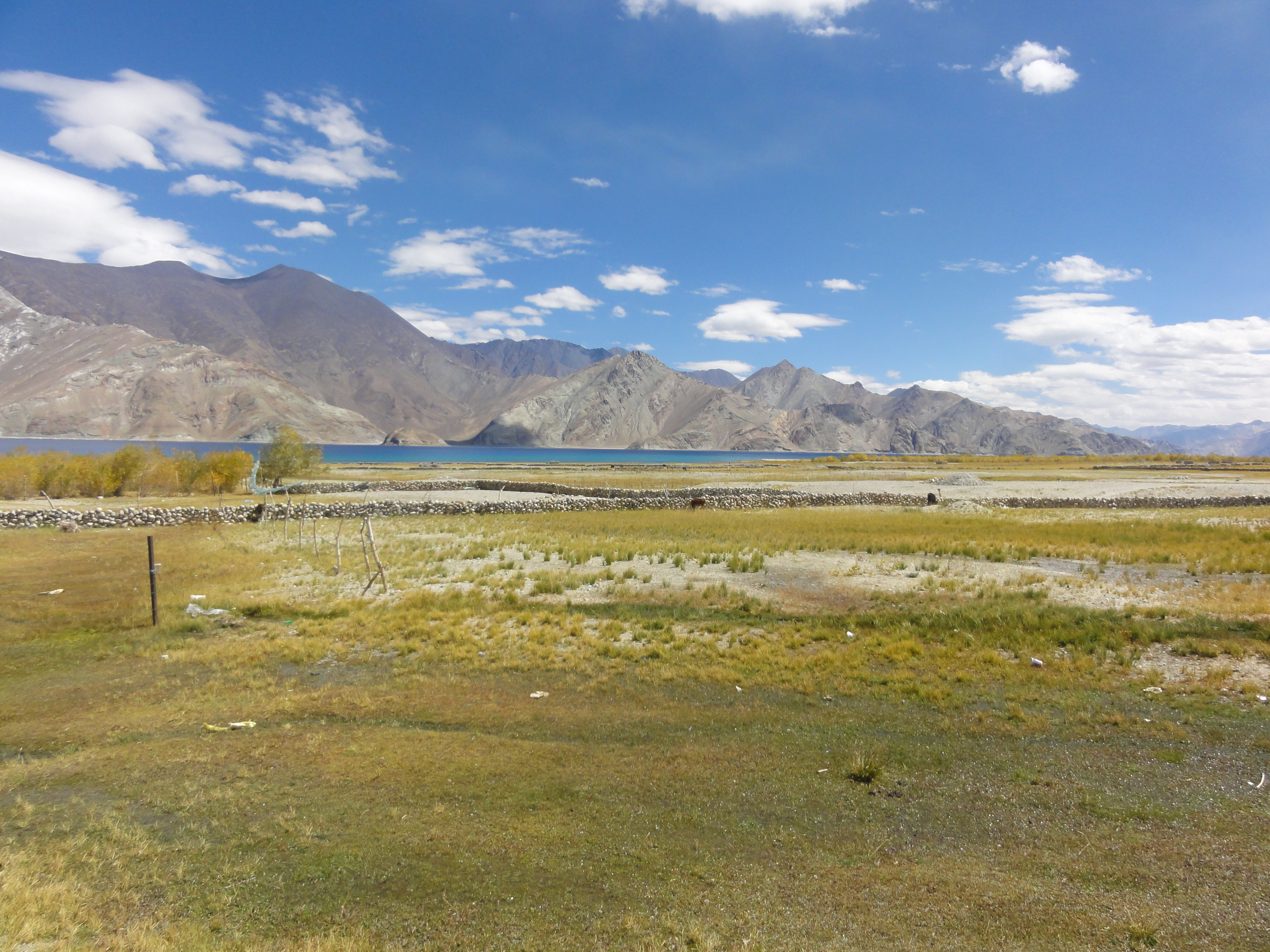
View of Pangong Tso from Merak village (October 2016)

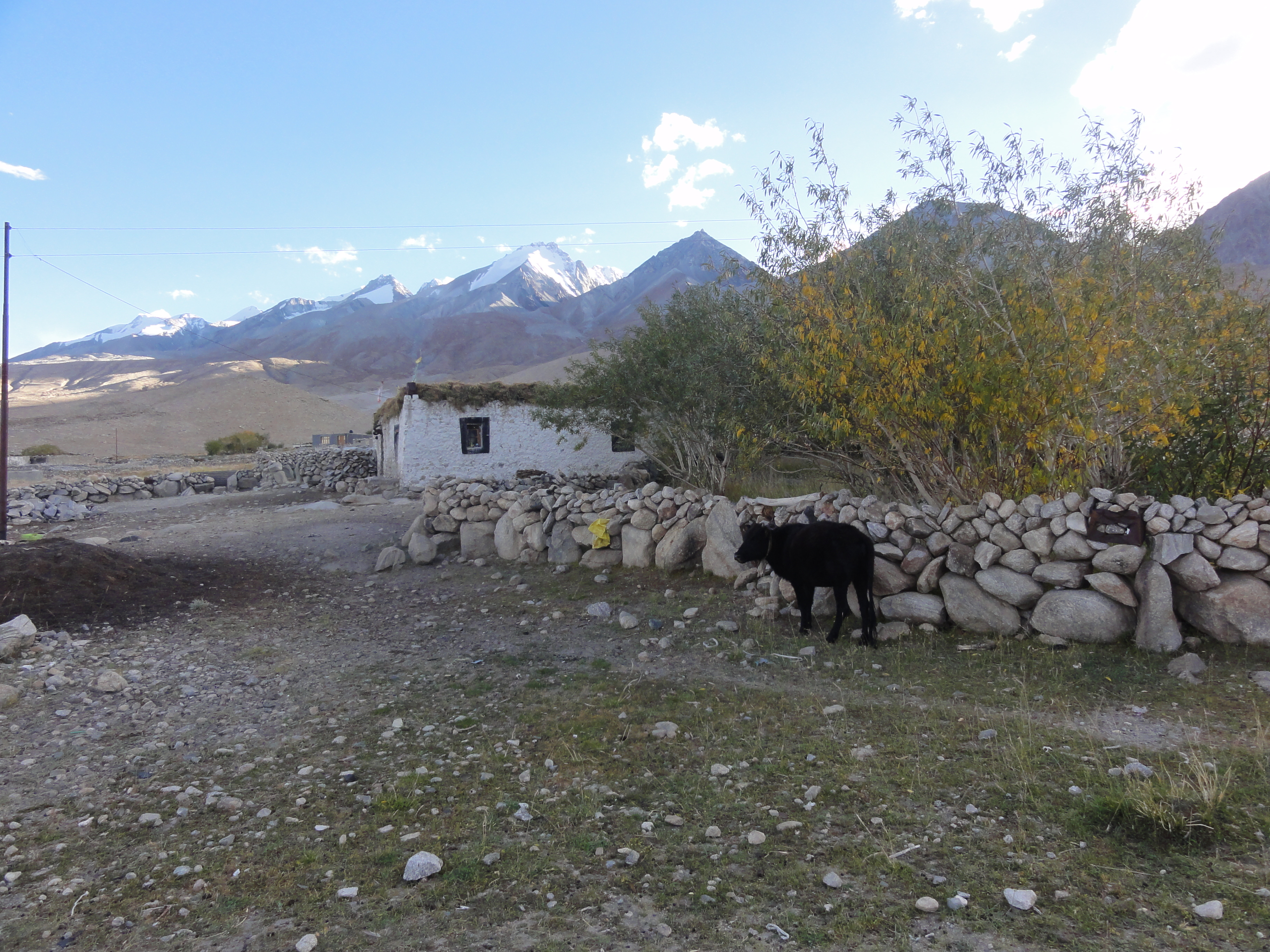
Merak village (October 2016)

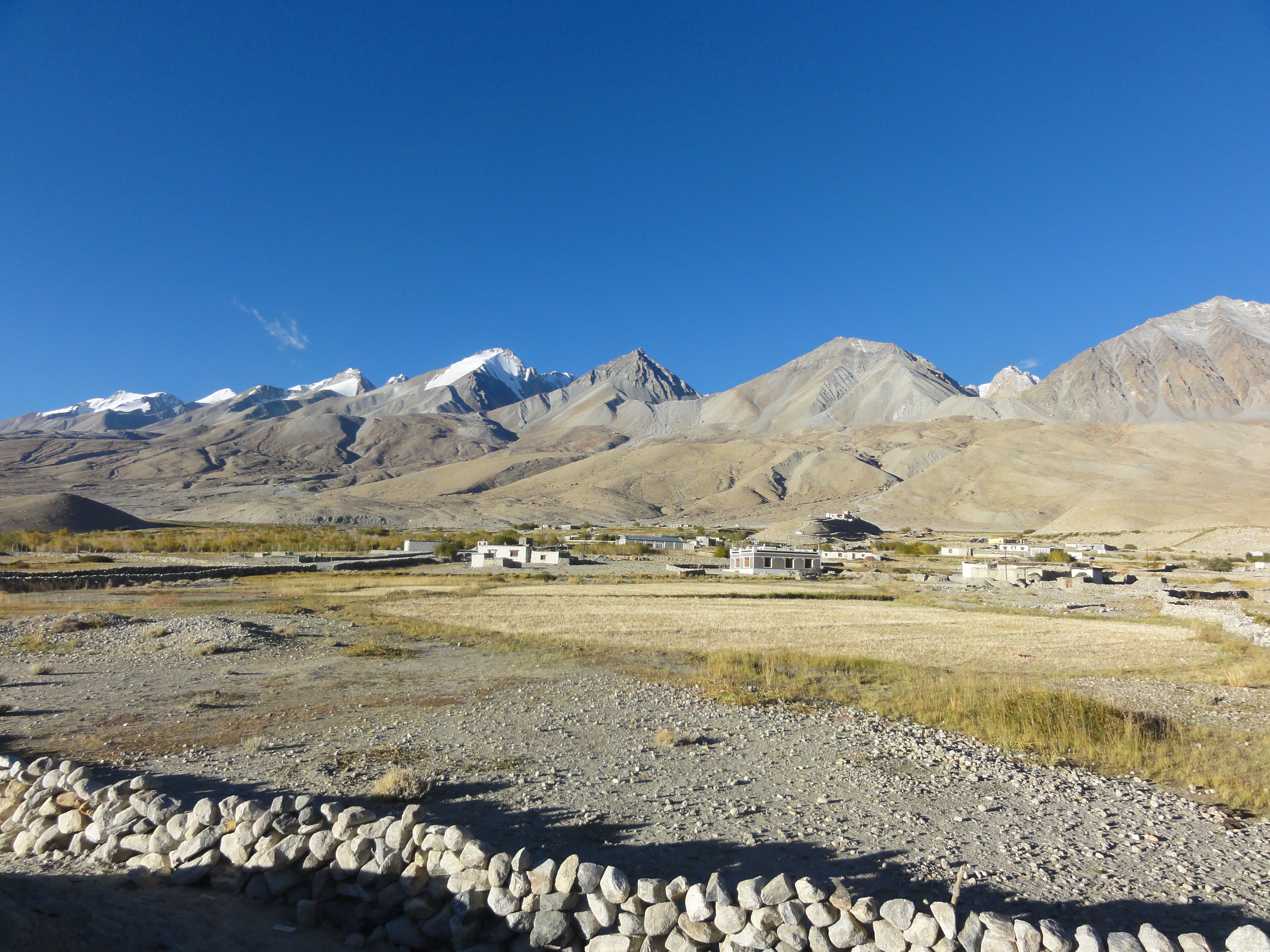
Merak village (October 2016)

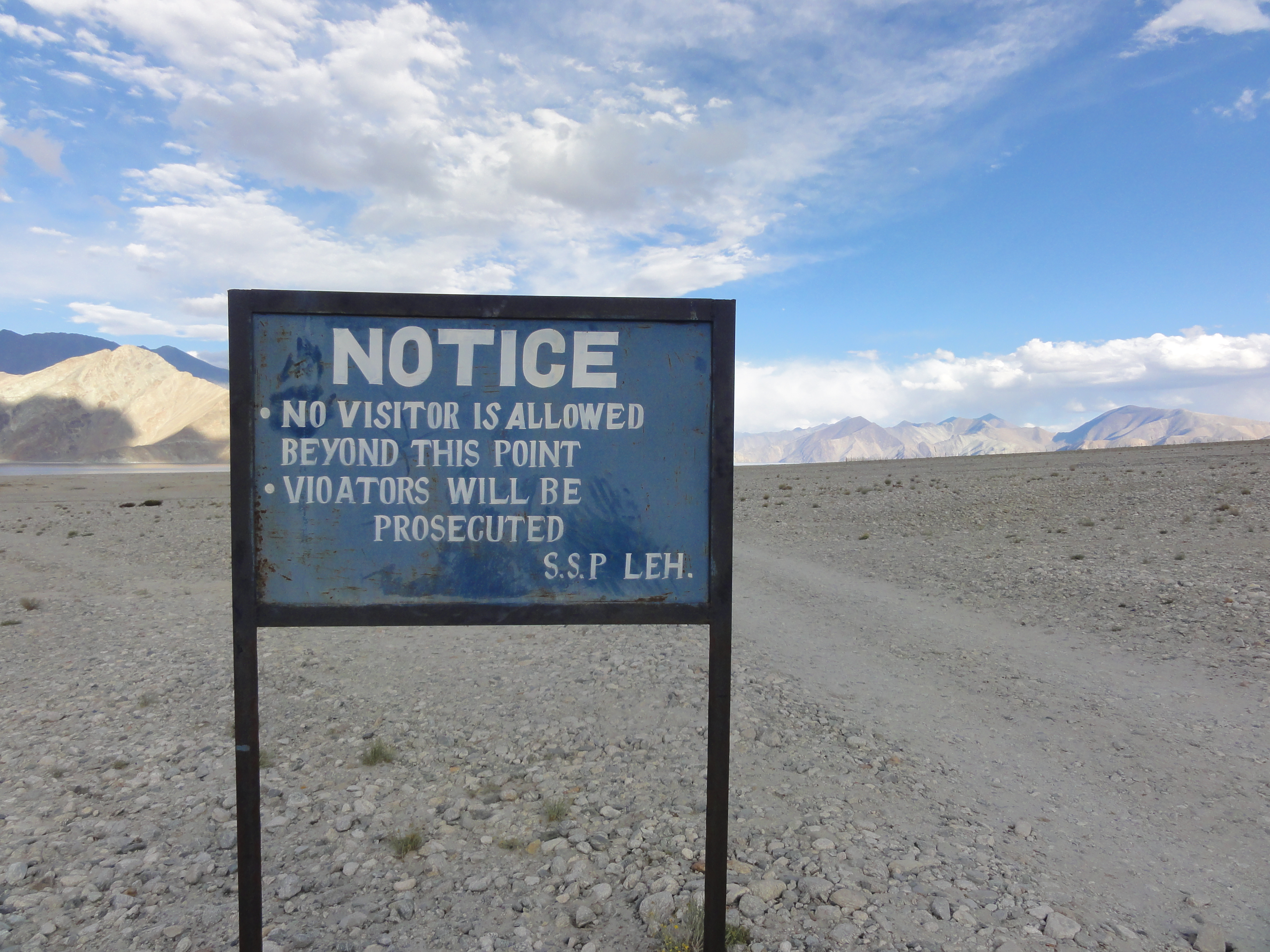
Police signpost, Merak (October 2016)

== See also ==
- Indian Astronomical Observatory
- Hanle (village)
