= Spangmik =

Village in Ladakh, India

- Location in Ladakh Spangmik (India)
- Coordinates: 33°54′25.9″N 78°27′26.28″E
- Country: India
- Union Territory: Ladakh
- Territory: Ladakh
- District: Leh district
- Postal code: 194201

Spangmik is a settlement on the southern bank of the Pangong Lake in Ladakh, India. It is located between Lukung and Man. Tourists visiting the Pangong Lake in India are allowed to travel up to Spangmik, beyond which it is considered sensitive border area with China.

== Location ==
Spangmik is situated 156 kilometers east of Leh, on the southern banks of Pangong Tso. It located on "a narrow stretch of land between the Chang Chenmo mountains and the lake".

The village is very close to the Line of Actual Control thats why tourists are allowed till this village. Further journey is prevented by an Indian Army check post.

In 2019, Ladakh Autonomous Hill Development Council, Leh dismantled illegal tents and other construction on state-owned land in Spangmik village. But, the villagers have sought permission to re-erect these tents camps on the banks of the lake, and blamed the LAHDC for "pushing locals away from their land and unwittingly encouraging the Chinese to occupy it".

== Infrastructure ==
Road

Spangamik Khated road connect this village along lac.

Mobile Internet Connectivity

Jio has made its 4G connectivity inside Spangmik Village.

== Gallery ==
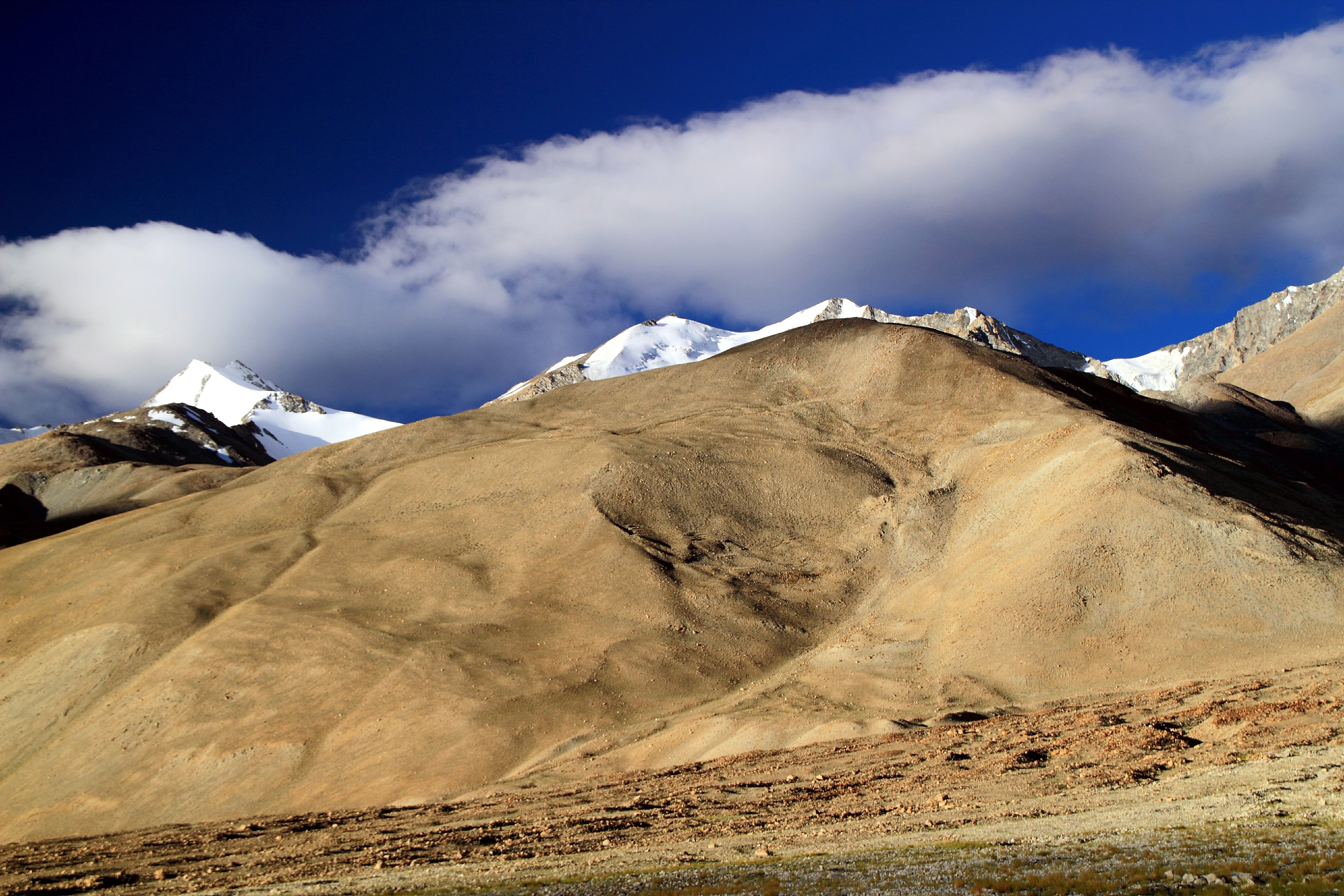
Peaks around the Pangong Tso at Spangmik (September 2013)

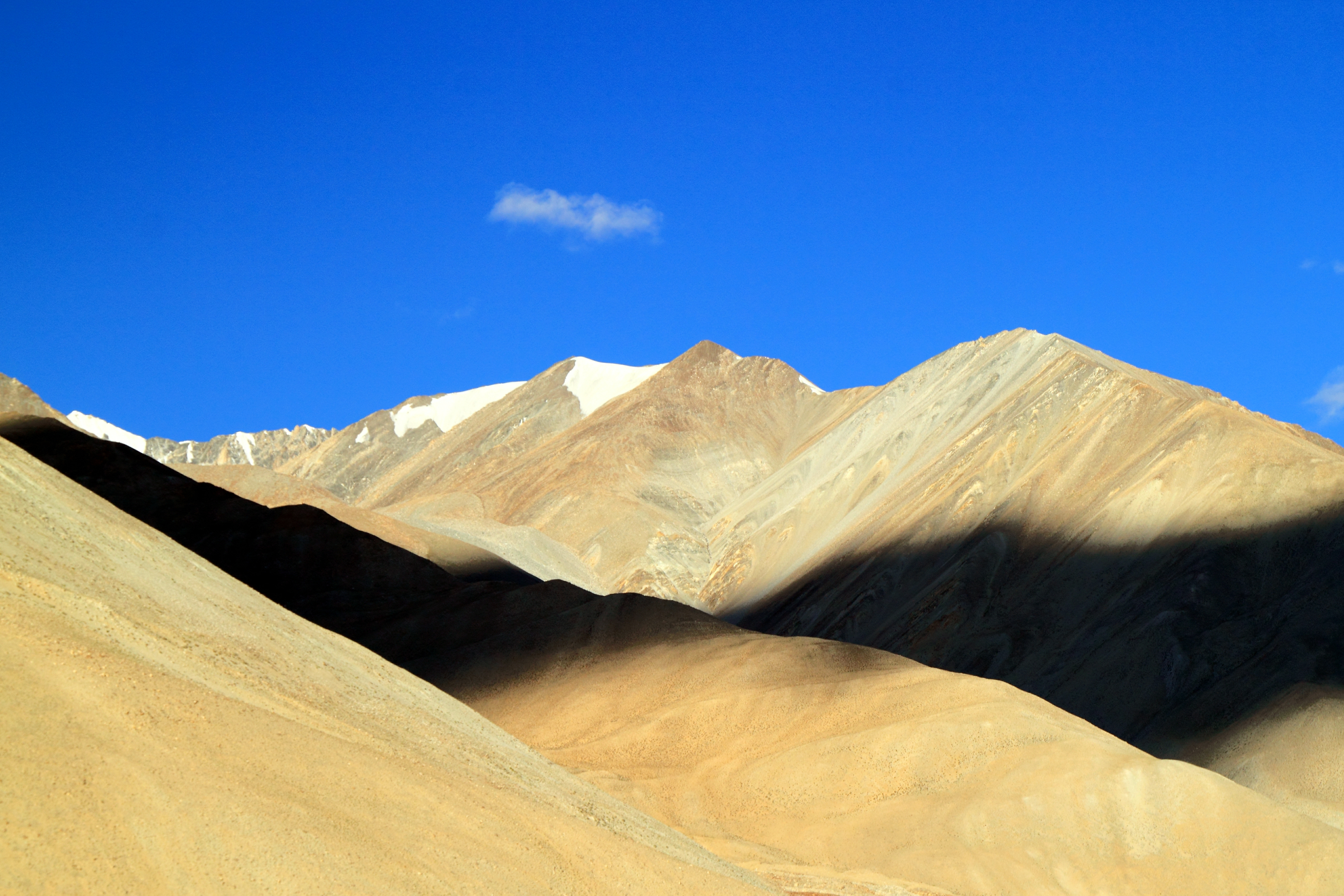
Peaks around the Pangong Tso at Spangmik (September 2013)

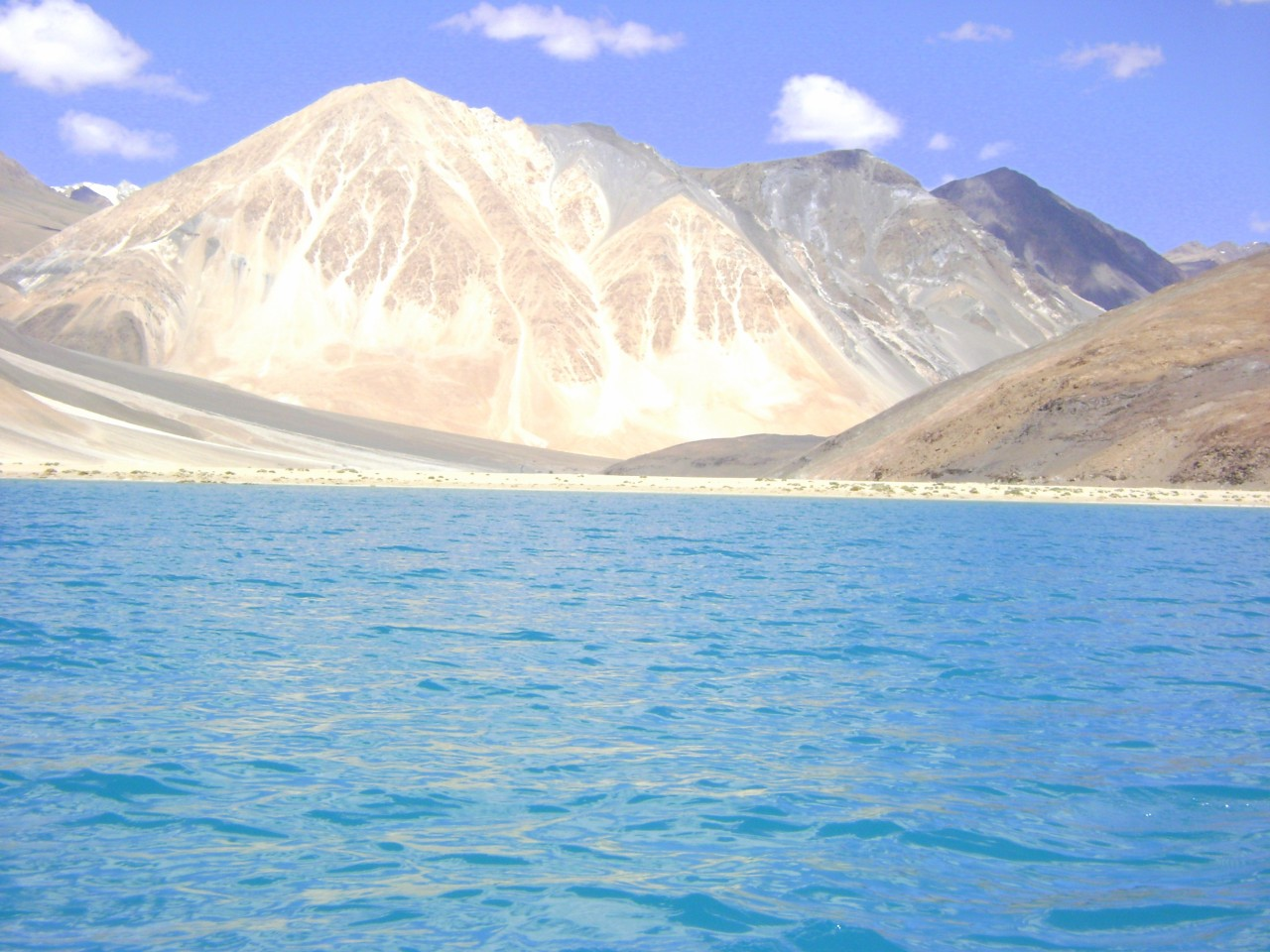
Pangong Tso on a bright sunny day, View from Spangmik (August 2009)

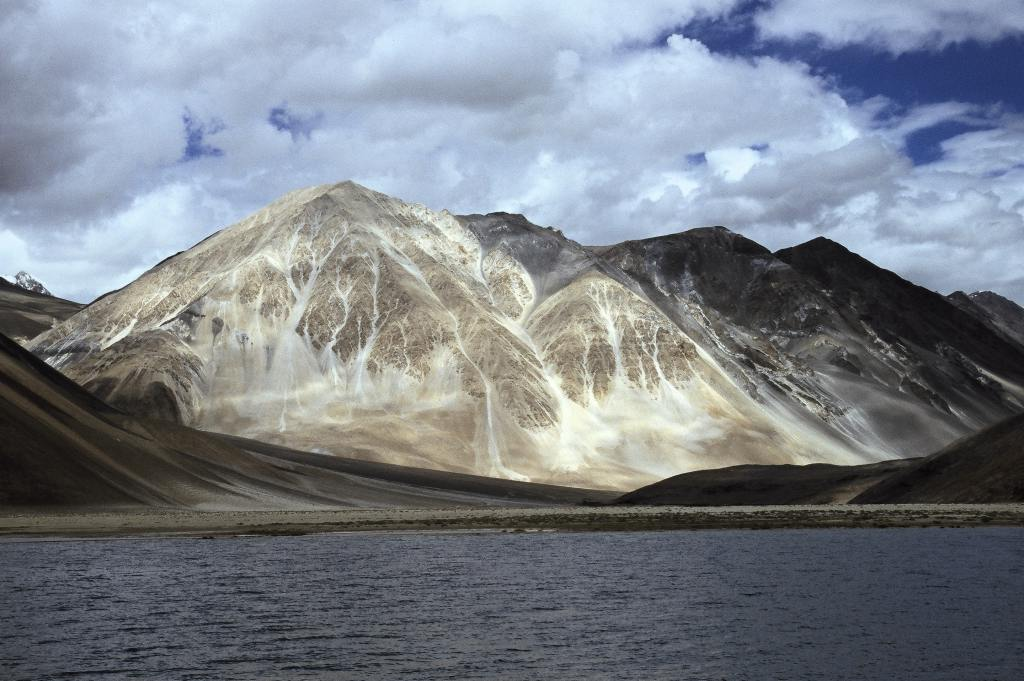
View of Pangong Tso from Spangmik (July 2004)
