= National Large Solar Telescope =

Indian observatory in Ladakh

- Location(s): Ladakh, India

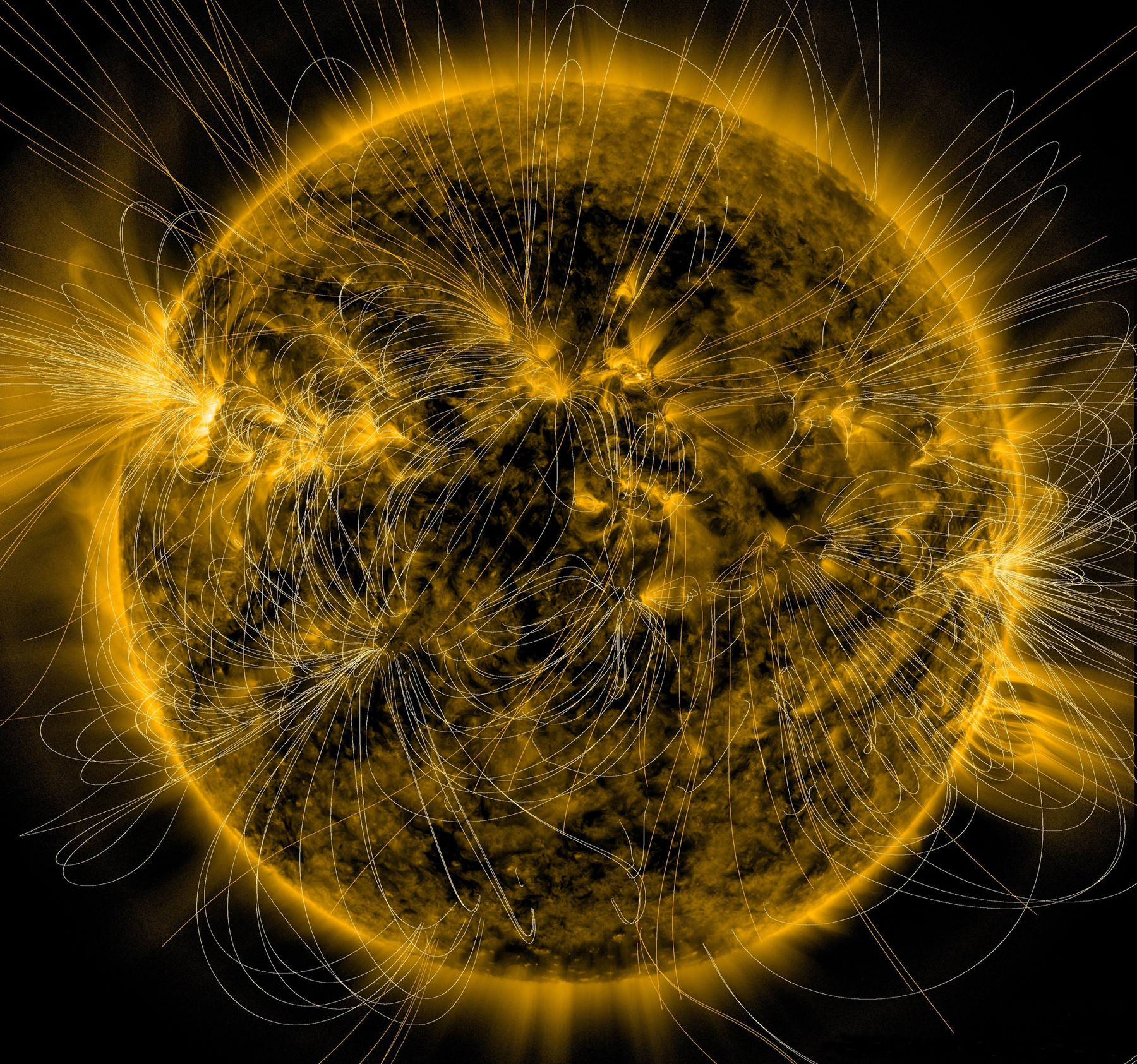
Picturing the Sun’s Magnetic Field (illustration).

The National Large Solar Telescope (NLST) is a Gregorian multi-purpose open telescope, in Merak village (altitude ~ 4,200 m) on the southern shore of Pangong Lake in Ladakh in India, which aims to study the Sun's microscopic structure. The Indian Institute of Astrophysics is the nodal agency for this project which collaborates with various other scientific bodies, such as the Indian Space Research Organisation (ISRO), Aryabhatta Research Institute of Observational-Sciences, Tata Institute of Fundamental Research (TIFR) and Inter-University Centre for Astronomy and Astrophysics (IUCAA). NLST serve as a crucial ground-based counterpart to India's space-based solar mission, Aditya-L1, allowing for multi-wavelength, multi-perspective observations of the Sun.

== History ==
In 2010, the initial proposal for the Merak NLST was made, but Ministry of Defence granted the security clearance only around 2016, and the telescope was installed at Merak in 2018 to study the solar chromosphere. The 2026 Indian budget also proposed multiple upgrades to NLST at a cost of about ₹1,000 crore (US$100 million) to be realised by 2030 for it to serve as a complement to the Aditya-L1 spacecraft.

== Telescope ==
NLST is an on-axis alt-azimuth Gregorian multi-purpose 2-meter-aperture open telescope with the provision of carrying out night time stellar observations using a spectrograph. It aims to resolve features on the Sun of the size of about 0.1 arcsec. The focal plane instruments include a high-resolution polarimeteric package to measure polarization with an accuracy of 0.01 per cent, a high-spectral-resolution spectrograph to obtain spectra in 5 widely separated absorption lines simultaneously, and high-spatial-resolution narrow-band imagers in various lines. The NLST project is a cornerstone of India's long-term strategy in solar physics. Its location in a longitudinal gap between major solar observatories in Europe and Japan is important for providing continuous observation of the Sun. The NLST complements the space-based missions like the Aditya-L1 and ground-based facilities, providing critical data for understanding the Sun's magnetic field and its influence on space weather. Project also includes the construction of the main dome, control rooms, housing for scientists and support staff, power generation facilities, and possibly a satellite communication link for data transfer.

Solar storms or Coronal Mass Ejections are large expulsions of billions of tons of plasma and its associated magnetic fields from the Sun into the interplanetary space, some of which can hit the Earth and produce geomagnetic storms. Extreme geomagnetic storms have the potential to harm space-technology dependent human life on Earth, such as disrupting radio communication, GPS signals, etc. Predicting these storms is an important area of scientific research.

— Indian Institute of Astrophysics

In November 2023, and also during the May 2024 solar storms, the relatively rarer Stable Auroral Red (SAR) arcs caused by the solar wind were observed in Merak.

== See also ==
- Indian Astronomical Observatory, at Hanle in Ladakh
- National Solar Mission, India's green solar energy initiative
- List of largest optical reflecting telescopes, larger than 3-meter-apurture
- List of solar telescopes, global list
- Lists of telescopes, list of global lists
