= Great Tibetan Marathon =

Marathon on the Tibetan Plateau in northern India

The Great Tibetan Marathon is an annual marathon that takes place on the Tibetan Plateau in Ladakh, a union territory in northern India.

== Event ==
The Great Tibetan Marathon is unusual in that it happens at an elevation of 3,500 meters. The high elevation makes the oxygen level extremely low and the marathon equally more physically challenging.

The marathon is influenced by the region's Tibetan Buddhism. The start of the marathon is indicated by the blowing of Buddhist horns, instead of the traditional shot by a starting pistol, and all runners are blessed by Buddhist monks, who also serve as helpers along the way.

== History ==
In 2003, the Great Tibetan Marathon was held on 16 August at Leh, Ladakh. Sonam Angdus of India won the men's marathon (02hr, 59min, 43sec) while Ishey Lhmao, also from India, won the women's marathon (03:35:43). Punchok of India won the men's half marathon (01:13:59) while Sonam Spaldon won the women's half marathon (01:49:02). Thirteen from Denmark and one each from Spain and Australia were in the top ten, in either of the sections of the main marathon.

In the 2007 edition, participating runners came from all over the world. The runners competed in the distances: marathon, half marathon, 10K and 5K. Rigzin Khandap was one of the top finishers who were invited with the other runners for dinner at minister of Ladakh, Jora Rigzin.

In 2009, 74 runners from all over the world finished the three distances: marathon, half marathon and 10 km. Majority of runners came from India and Europe with a minority coming from Southeast Asia and North Asia including Kenny Ng from Singapore who participated in the full marathon twice in 2007 and 2008. The event did not take place in 2010.

== Preparation ==
As it is a high elevation race, organizers recommend that participants arrive in Ladakh a week before the race to get acclimatized to the conditions. As part of the race schedule, the organizers also include a trial run and a trek in the 2 days prior to race day to ensure runners get a sense of the task at hand. The medical team also checks the runners after the trial runs to see whether their bodies have acclimatized to the conditions.

== Past winners ==
Edition	Date	Men's winner	Time	Women's winner	Time
??	16 August 2003	Sonam Angdus (India)	1:13:59	Ishey Lhmao (India)	3:35:43
1st	21 July 2007	Jan Petersen (DEN)	3:22:06	Lykke P. Andersen (DEN)	4:36:57
2nd	19 July 2008	Trausti Valdimarsson (ISL)	3:44:50	Maricruz Lopez (MEX)	4:27:09
03:24:59	Leanne Juul (SAF)	03:58:08			

== See also ==
- Adventure running
- Festivals in Ladakh
