= Major Atmospheric Cerenkov Experiment Telescope =

Ground-based Gamma-ray Cerenkov Telescope part of Indian Astronomical Observatory

- Alternative names: MACE
- Location: Hanle, Leh district, Ladakh, India
- Coordinates: 32°47′N 78°58′E
- Altitude: 4,270 m (14,010 ft)
- Collecting area: 356 m^{2} (3,830 sq ft)
- Focal length: 21 m (68 ft 11 in)
- Website: www.iiap.res.in/centers/iao
- Location within India
- Related media on Commons

Major Atmospheric Cerenkov Experiment Telescope (MACE) is an imaging atmospheric Cerenkov telescope (IACT) located near Hanle, Ladakh, India. It is the highest (in altitude) and second largest Cerenkov telescope in the world. It was built by Electronics Corporation of India, Hyderabad, for the Bhabha Atomic Research Centre and was assembled at the campus of Indian Astronomical Observatory at Hanle. It was originally scheduled to become operational by 2016, but plans were pushed back to begin operations in 2020.

Due to the remote location and harsh environment of the site, the telescope is remotely operated. A dedicated 240 kW solar power station was built to fulfil the power requirements of the observatory.

The telescope is the second-largest gamma ray telescope in the world and will help the scientific community enhance its understanding in the fields of astrophysics, fundamental physics, and particle acceleration mechanisms. The largest telescope of the same class is the 28-metre-diameter High Energy Stereoscopic System (HESS) telescope being operated in Namibia.

Though commissioned on September, 2021, the telescope was formally inaugurated on 4th October 2024

== Description ==
The telescope is named after the Soviet scientist Pavel Cherenkov, who predicted that charged particles moving at high speeds in a medium emit light. The high-energy gamma rays emitted from black holes, centers of galaxies and pulsars do not reach the land as they get absorbed in the atmosphere. Upon interaction with the atmosphere, these photons produce electron–positron pairs, leading to a cascade of particles which while moving at very high speed give rise to Cerenkov radiation.

Very-high-energy (VHE) gamma rays offer a unique insight into some of the most extreme phenomena of the universe. Detection of celestial VHE gamma rays allows the study of exotic objects like pulsars, pulsar wind nebulae, super nova remnants, micro-quasars, active galactic nuclei etc. where particles are accelerated to TeV (10^{12} eV) energies and beyond. These exceptionally energetic photons are detected on the Earth by an indirect process which uses the Earth's atmosphere as a transducer. The Cherenkov light is beamed around the direction of the incident gamma ray and covers an area of around 50,000 square meters on the ground. This effective area is far larger in magnitude than the area of satellite instruments used for detecting gamma rays directly. To detect these flashes of Cherenkov light, photomultiplier tube cameras are used at the focus of large tracking light collectors. The intensity of the image recorded by the telescope is related to the energy of the incident gamma ray photon.

The MACE Telescope consists of a large-area tessellated light collector of 356 m^{2}, made up of 356 mirror panels. A high-resolution imaging camera weighing about 1200 kg, for detection and characterization of the atmospheric Cherenkov events, forms the focal plane instrumentation of the telescope. The elevation over azimuth mounted telescope basket structure has two axes movement capability of ± 270° in azimuth and -26° to +165° in elevation for pointing towards any source in the sky and tracking it. The telescope, which weighs about 180 tons, is supported on six wheels which move on a 27-metre-diameter track.

The telescope has an integrated imaging camera, which contains 1088 photo multiplier-based pixels and all the signal processing and data acquisition electronics. The camera communicates the acquired data to the computer system in the control room over optical fiber.

The main features of the telescope include safe and secure operation of the telescope remotely from anywhere in the world, and its structure is designed to operate in winds of speed up to 30 km/h and retain its structural integrity in the parking position in winds of speed up to 150 km/h.

== Specifications ==
- Built by: Electronics Corporation of India, Hyderabad
- Location: Hanle, Ladakh
- Length: 21 meters
- Weight: 180 metric tons
- Azimuth: −270° to +270°
- Elevation: −26° to +165°
- Area: 356 m^{2}
- Energy range: 20 to 100 GeV and also beyond 5 TeV
- Altitude: 4,500 m above the mean sea level.

== Achievements ==
- On January 26, 2025, MACE observatory detected strong gamma-ray signal from a distant galaxy (OP 313) located ~8 billion light years away.

== See also ==
- Indian Astronomical Observatory
- List of highest astronomical observatories
- Lists of telescopes
- Gamma-ray astronomy
- High Energy Stereoscopic System
