= Indian Astronomical Observatory =

Astronomy station in Hanle, India

Indian Astronomical Observatory (IAO)
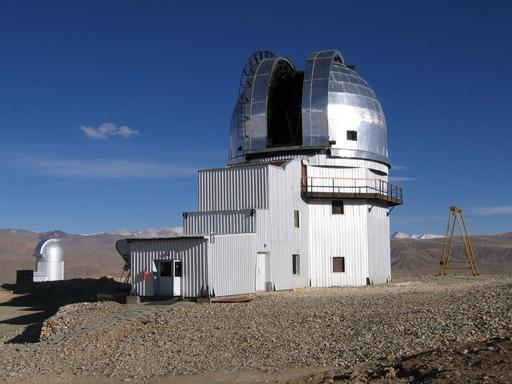
- Image of Himalayan Chandra Telescope part of Indian Astronomical Observatory
- Alternative names: Hanle Observatory
- Organization: Indian Institute of Astrophysics
- Location: Hanle, Leh district, Ladakh, India
- Coordinates: 32°46′46″N 78°57′51″E
- Altitude: 4,500 m (14,800 ft)
- Established: 2001
- Website: www.iiap.res.in?q=iao.htm
- Telescopes: GROWTH-India telescope; High Altitude Gamma Ray Telescope; Himalayan Chandra Telescope; Major Atmospheric Cerenkov Experiment Telescope
- Related media on Commons

The Indian Astronomical Observatory (IAO) is a high-altitude astronomy station in Hanle, Ladakh, India, operated by the Indian Institute of Astrophysics. Situated in the Western Himalayas at an elevation of 4,500 metres (14,800 ft), it is among the world's highest sites for optical, infrared, and gamma-ray telescopes. It is the tenth-highest optical telescope in the world.

== Location ==
The Indian Astronomical Observatory is located on Mount Saraswati, Digpa-rasta Ri, Hanle in the south-eastern Ladakh union territory of India. The observatory is located near the Line of Actual Control, the disputed Indo-Chinese border. Accessing it requires a 250-kilometre-long (160-mile) ten-hour drive from the Leh city.

== History ==
In the late 1980s, a committee chaired by B. V. Sreekantan recommended that a national, large optical telescope must be constructed in India. The search for the observatory site began in 1992 under the leadership of astronomer Arvind Bhatnagar. Scientists from the Indian Institute of Astrophysics found the site at Hanle suitable.

The first light was seen by the 2-metre telescope in the observatory on the midnight hour between 26 and 27 September 2000.

The satellite link between the Centre for Research and Education in Science and Technology (CREST), Bengaluru, and Hanle was inaugurated by the then Jammu and Kashmir Chief Minister Farooq Abdullah on 2 June 2001. The observatory was dedicated to the nation on 29 August 2001.

== Dark-sky preserve ==
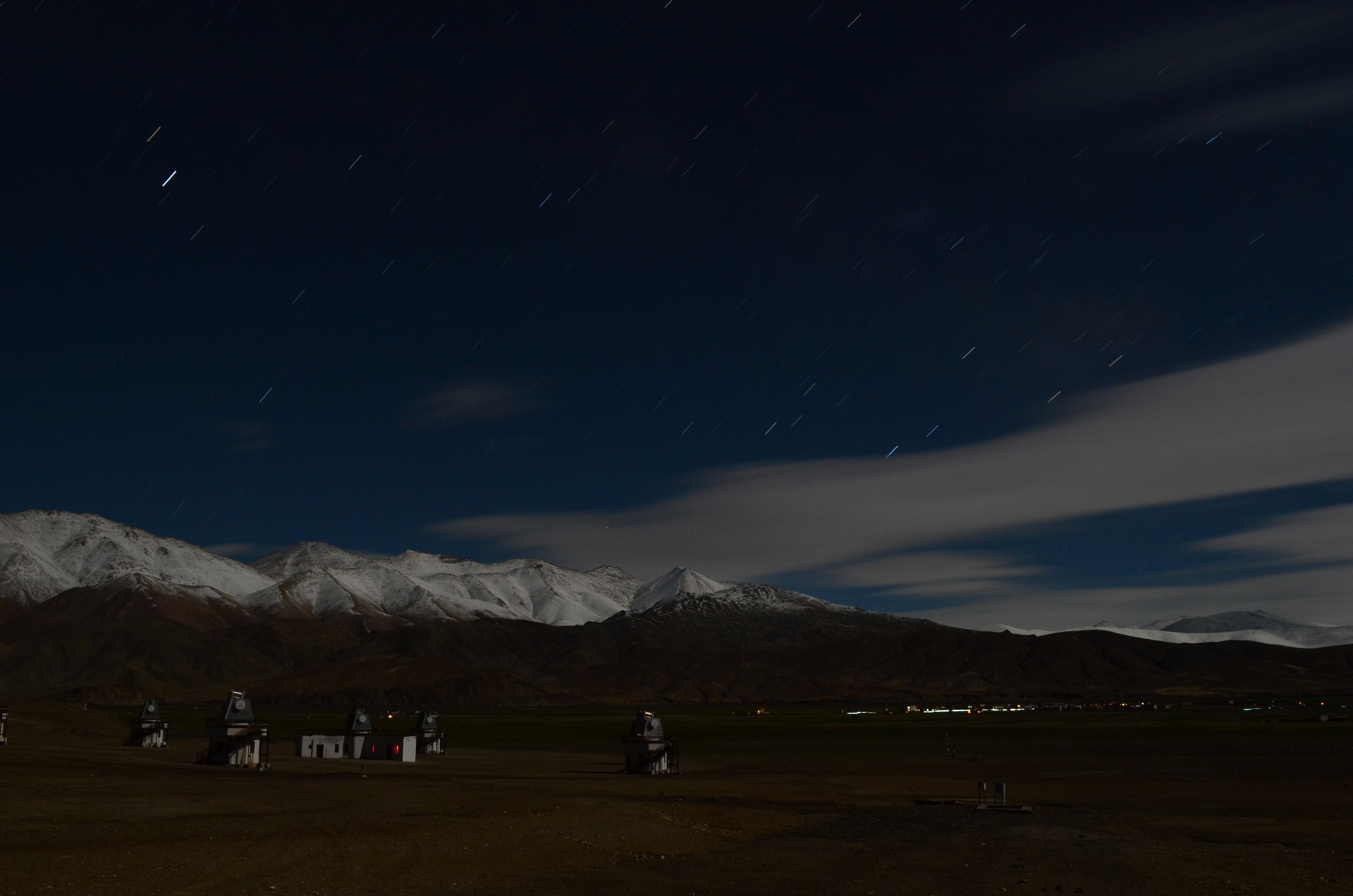
Hanle's high energy gamma-ray telescopes at night

In September 2022, the area surrounding Hanle became India's first dark-sky preserve. The Hanle site is deemed to be excellent for visible, infrared, and submillimeter observations throughout the year. Specifically, the observation conditions yield about 255 spectroscopic nights per year, approximately 190 photometric nights per year, and an annual rain-plus-snow precipitation of less than 10cm. In addition, there are low ambient temperatures, low humidity, low concentration of atmospheric aerosols, low atmospheric water vapour, dark nights, and low pollution. The preserve extends to the 6 hamlets of Hanle village—Bhok, Dhado, Punguk, Khuldo, Naga, and Tibetan Refugee habitation within 1073 km^{2}, part of the Changthang Wildlife Sanctuary in Changthang plateau. The extremities of the preserve are between 19.6 km and 22 km from the observatory.

The darkness of the night sky is classified on the Bortle scale as an "excellent" dark astronomical site with Bortle colour key "Black". Dark sky is important for the conservation of nocturnal animals and ecology. To minimize light pollution and to ensure dark skies, Hanle preserve has many restrictions such as lights being indoors-only in certain places, mandatory light-blocking curtains on windows and doors, street light colors limited to yellow, no high-beam headlights on vehicles, and restricted vehicle movements at night.

To avoid altitude sickness, tourists are recommended to acclimatize themselves for a day or two at Leh or Hanle at 4,500 metres (14,800 ft) elevation.

== Facilities ==
The Observatory has several active telescopes.

=== Himalayan Chandra Telescope (HCT) ===
The Himalayan Chandra Telescope is a 2.01-metre (79 in) optical-infrared telescope named after the India-born Nobel laureate Subrahmanyam Chandrasekhar. It contains a modified Ritchey-Chretien system with a primary mirror made of ULE ceramic which is designed to withstand low temperatures. The telescope was manufactured by Electo-Optical System Technologies Inc. at Tucson, Arizona, USA. The telescope is mounted with 3 science instruments called the Himalaya Faint Object Spectrograph (HFOSC), the near-IR imager, and the optical CCD imager. The telescope is remotely operated via an INSAT-3B satellite link which allows operation in sub-zero temperatures in winter. The satellite link is controlled by the Center for Research and Education in Science and Technology (CREST) situated near Hoskote, Bengaluru.

=== GROWTH-India Telescope ===
The GROWTH-India telescope is a 0.7-metre (28 in) wide-field optical telescope that had first light in 2018. It is India's first fully robotic research telescope. It was set up as a part of the international GROWTH program, and has been widely used for time-domain astronomy. The telescope is operated jointly by IIT Bombay and the Indian Institute of Astrophysics.

=== IIA-Washington University Cassegrain Telescope ===
Since 2011, the Indian Institute of Astrophysics has collaborated with the McDonnell Center for the Space Sciences of Washington University in St. Louis to operate two 0.5-metre (20 in) Cassegrain telescopes to monitor active galactic nuclei. One of these observatories is established in Hanle. The facilities, 180 degrees apart in longitude, are together to be called the Antipodal Transient Observatory (ATO).

=== High Altitude Gamma Ray Telescope ===
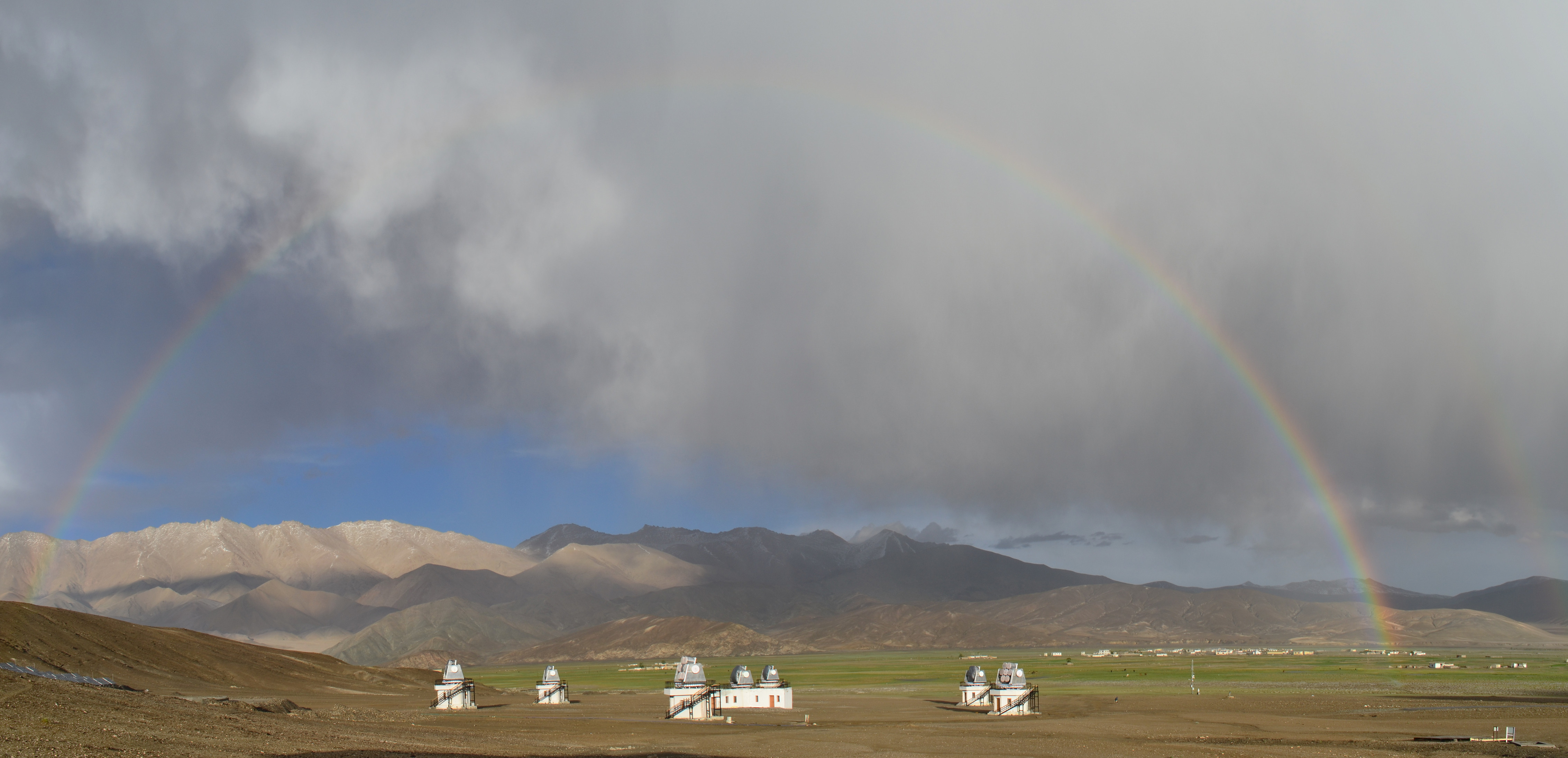
High Altitude Gamma Ray Telescope (HAGAR), Hanle

The High Altitude Gamma Ray Telescope (HAGAR) is an atmospheric Cerenkov experiment with seven telescopes set up at Hanle in 2008. Each telescope has seven mirrors with a total area of 4.4 square metres (47 ft^{2}). The telescopes are deployed on the periphery of a circle of radius 50 metres (160 ft) with one telescope at the center. Each telescope has alt-azimuth mounting. A Himalayan Gamma Ray Observatory (HiGRO) was set up at Hanle in collaboration with Tata Institute of Fundamental Research, Mumbai and Bhabha Atomic Research Centre, Mumbai.

The Major Atmospheric Cerenkov Experiment Telescope (MACE) was set up here in December 2012. The Experiment has a 21-metre (69 ft) collector which can collect gamma rays from space. The facility is a result of an initiative led by Bhabha Atomic Research Centre in collaboration with the Tata Institute of Fundamental Research, Indian Institute of Astrophysics, Bangalore and Saha Institute of Nuclear Physics, Kolkata. The facility cost Rs. 400 million for construction. In 2011, it was the first and only such facility in the Eastern Hemisphere. The telescope was fabricated by the Electronics Corporation of India and was installed at the IAO in June 2014. This telescope became the second-largest gamma-ray telescope in the world and the world's largest telescope at the highest altitude.

== See also ==
- Astrotourism in India
- List of astronomical observatories
- National Large Solar Telescope
- List of highest astronomical observatories
