= Lukung =

Village in Ladakh, India

- Location in Ladakh Lukung (India)
- Coordinates: 33°59′43.722″N 78°24′47.292″E
- Country: India
- Union Territory: Ladakh
- Territory: Ladakh
- District: Leh district
- Elevation: 4,378 m (14,364 ft)
- Postal code: 194201

Lukung is a village located on the banks of Pangong Tso, near Line of Actual Control in the Leh District, Ladakh.

== Location ==
Lukung is located 142 km east of Leh and is known as Gateway to Pangong Tso. Its elevation is 4,378 m (14,364 ft).

== Gallery ==
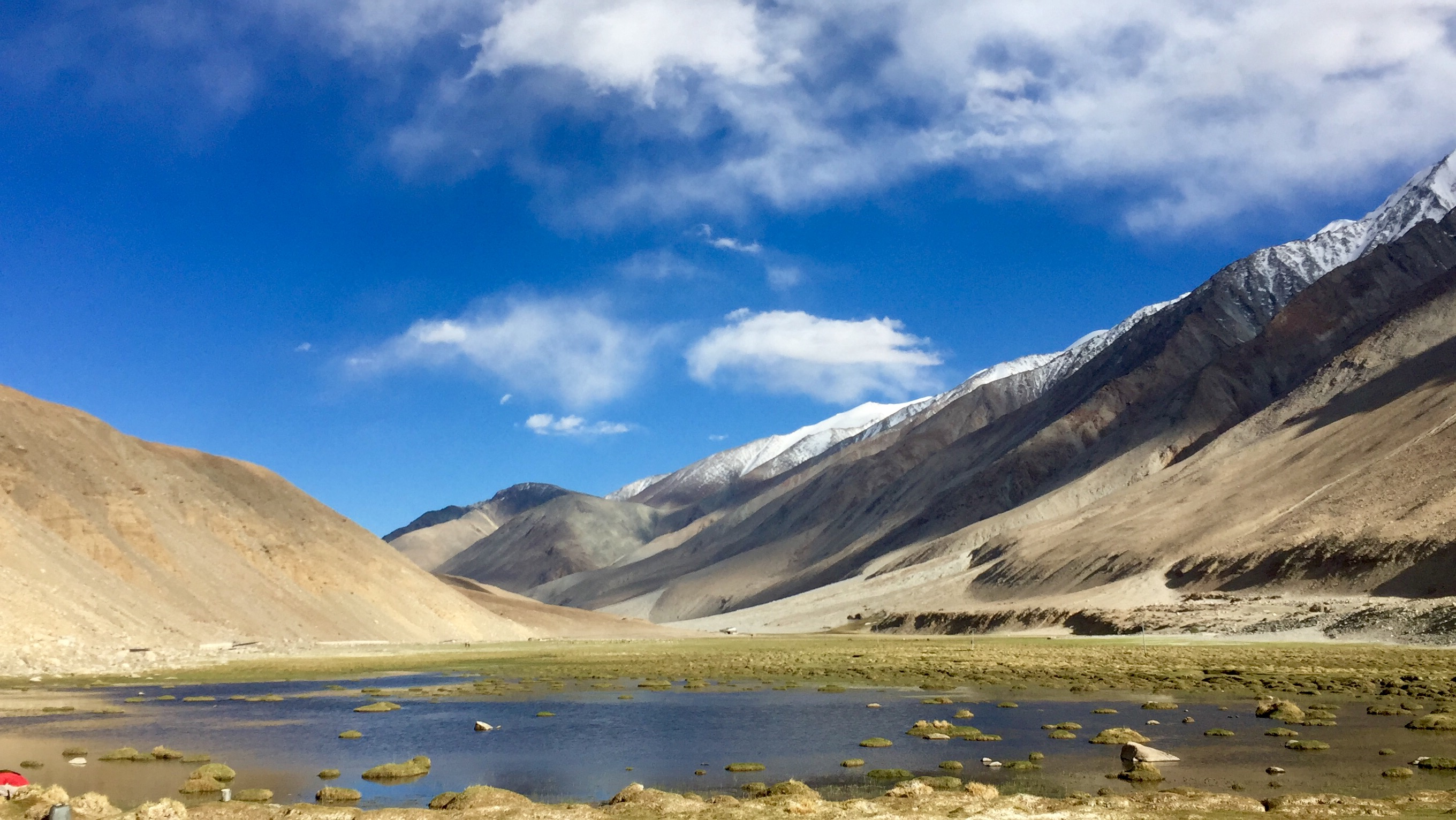
Lukung valley area (May 2016)

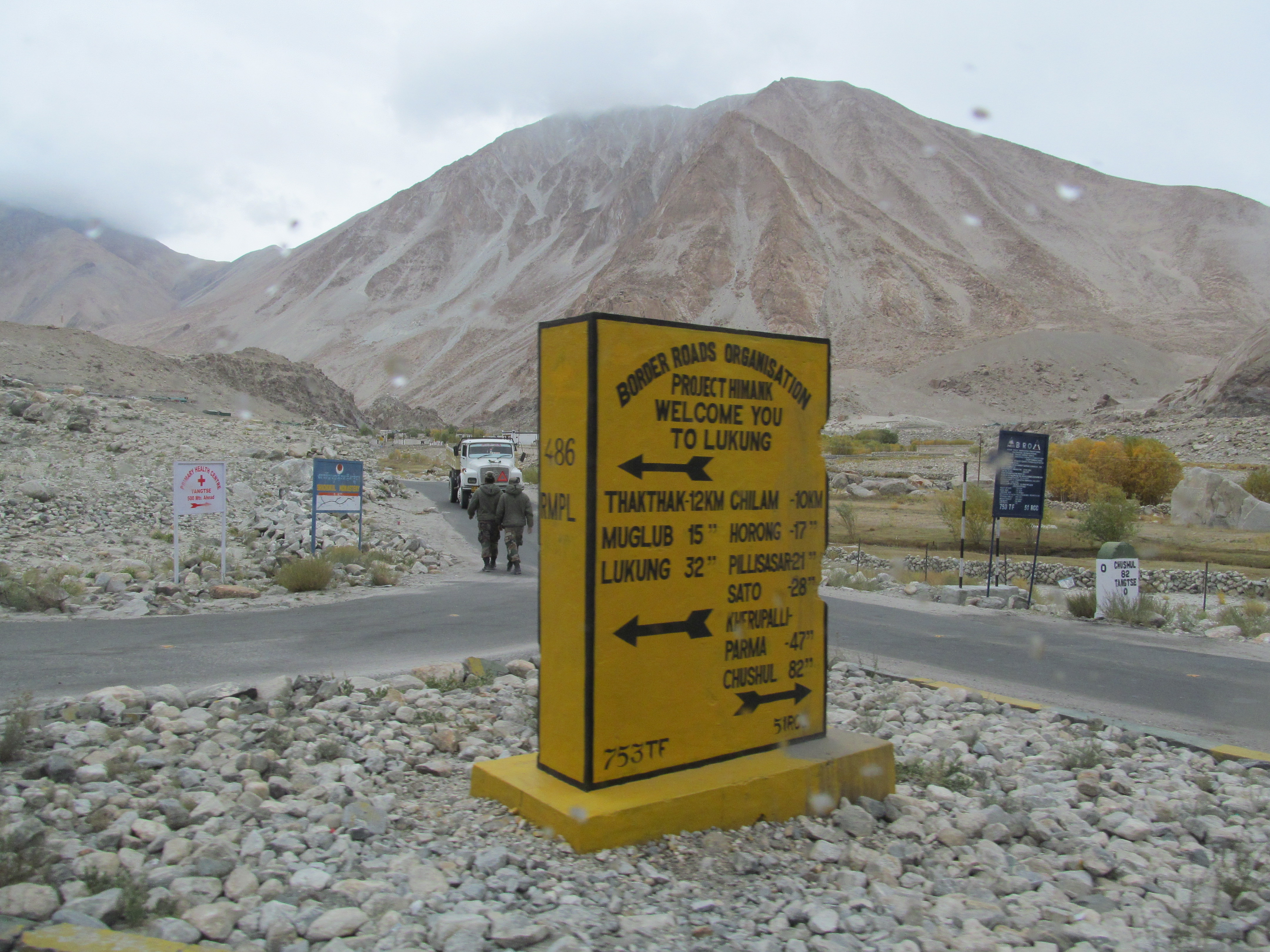
Welcomen to Lukung, the milestone (September 2013)

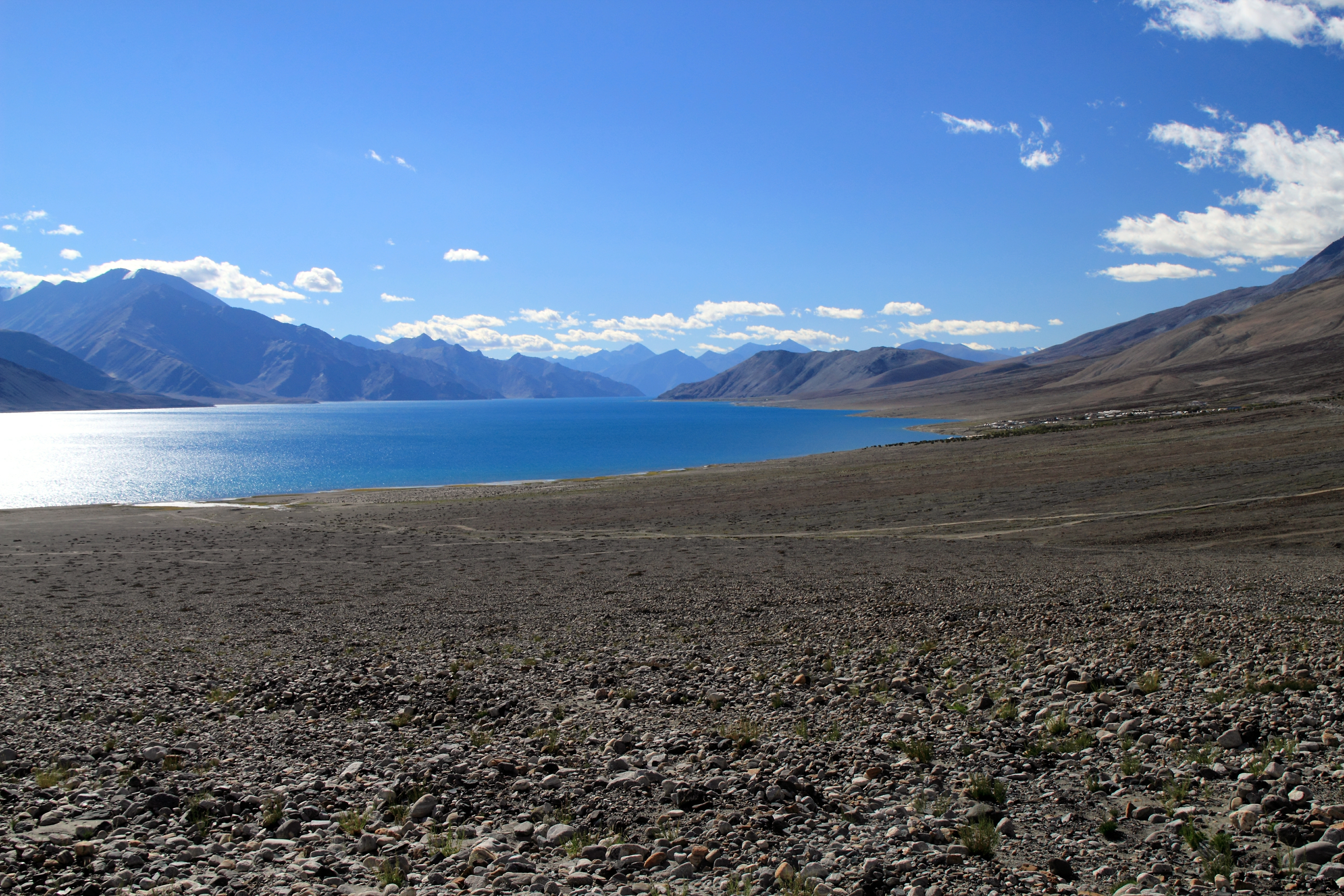
The Pangong Tso and Lukung on the right (September 2013)
