= Man Pangong =

- Village
- Location in Ladakh, India Man Pangong (India)
- Coordinates: 33.801923°N 78.433250°E
- Country: India
- Union Territory: Ladakh
- District: Changthang
- Tehsil: Tangtse

Population (2011)
  - Total: 977
- Time zone: UTC+5:30 (IST)
- Census code: 876

Man Pangong is a village in the Changthang district of the Indian union territory of Ladakh. It is located in the Tangtse tehsil, near the Pangong Tso lake.

== Demographics ==
According to the 2011 census of India, Man Pangong has 171 households. The effective literacy rate (i.e. the literacy rate of population excluding children aged 6 and below) is 69.52%.

Demographics (2011 Census)
	Total	Male	Female
Population	977	459	518
Children aged below 6 years	111	52	59
Scheduled caste	0	0	0
Scheduled tribe	969	455	514
Literates	602	338	264
Workers (all)	670	317	353
Main workers (total)	435	234	201
Main workers: Cultivators	345	179	166
Main workers: Agricultural labourers	6	4	2
Main workers: Household industry workers	1	1	0
Main workers: Other	83	50	33
Marginal workers (total)	235	83	152
Marginal workers: Cultivators	215	69	146
Marginal workers: Agricultural labourers	3	1	2
Marginal workers: Household industry workers	0	0	0
Marginal workers: Others	17	13	4
Non-workers	307	142	165
