= No =

No or NO may refer to:

== Linguistics and symbols ==
- Yes and no, responses
- No, an English determiner in noun phrases
- No (kana) (の, ノ), a letter/syllable in Japanese script
- No symbol (🚫), the general prohibition sign
- Numero sign (№ or No.), a typographic symbol for the word "number"
- Norwegian language (ISO 639-1 code "no")

== Places ==
- Niederösterreich (NÖ), Lower Austria
- Norway (ISO 3166-1 country code NO, internet top level domain .no)
- No, Denmark, a village in Denmark
- Nō, Niigata, a former town in Japan
- No Creek (disambiguation), several streams
- Lake No, in South Sudan
- New Orleans, Louisiana, US or its professional sports teams:
  - New Orleans Saints of the National Football League
  - New Orleans Pelicans of the National Basketball Association
- Province of Novara (Piedmonte, Italy), province code NO

== Arts and entertainment ==
=== Film and television ===
- No (2012 film), a 2012 Chilean film
- Nô (film), a 1998 Canadian film
- Julius No, the titular character of the 1958 novel and 1962 film Dr. No

=== Music ===
==== Albums ====
- No!, 2002, by They Might Be Giants
- No (Boris album), 2020
- No (Old Man Gloom album), 2012

==== Songs ====
- "No" (Bulldog song), 1972
- "No" (Little Mix song), 2021
- "No" (Louane song), 2017
- "No" (Meghan Trainor song), 2016
- "No" (Meladze song), 2012
- "No" (Shakira song), 2005
- "No" (Summer Walker song), 2025
- "No", by Jason Aldean on his album Relentless, 2007
- "No", by De La Soul on their album The Grind Date, 2004
- "No", by Fontaines D.C. on their album A Hero's Death, 2020
- "No", by Hunter Hayes on his album Wild Blue (Part I), 2019
- "No", by Nicolas Jaar on his album Sirens, 2016
- "No", by Miranda! on their album Fuerte, 2017
- "No", by Moka Only on his album Magickal Weirdness, 2015
- "No", by Monrose on their album Temptation, 2006
- "No", by Moodymann on his album Moodymann, 2014
- "No", by Alanis Morissette from the Japanese edition of Havoc and Bright Lights, 2012 and featured in the Broadway musical Jagged Little Pill
- "No", by Soulfly from Soulfly, 1998
- "No", by Timbiriche from Timbiriche VII, 1987
- "N.O", by BTS from their O!RUL8,2? album, 2013

=== Other media ===
- Noh (Nō), a style of Japanese theatre

== Organizations ==
- National Offensive, a German neo-Nazi party between 1990–1992
- Aus-Air (IATA code), a defunct Australian airline
- Neos (airline) (IATA code), an Italian airline

== Science and technology ==
- .no, the internet ccTLD for Norway
- Nitric oxide (NO), a chemical compound
- Nobelium (No), a chemical element
- Surreal number ($\mathbb{No}$), class of numbers in mathematics
- Normally open, a type of electrical switch

== Other uses ==
- Roh (name) (transliteration: No), a Korean surname

== See also ==
- List of acronyms: N#NO
- Dr. No (disambiguation)
- Nô (disambiguation)
- No, No, No (disambiguation)
- No-no (disambiguation)
- Noo (disambiguation)
- Noh (disambiguation)
- Nou (disambiguation)
- Number sign (#)
