= No Drama =

No Drama may refer to:

== Music ==
- No Drama, a 2007 album by OJB Jezreel

=== Songs ===
- "No Drama" ('Tinashe' song), 2018
- "No Drama" ('Becky G' and 'Ozuna' song), 2020
- "No Drama (Clap and Revolve)", a song by Fat Joe
- "No Drama", a 2018 song by James Hype
- "No Drama", a 2018 song by Noizy; see Noizy discography
- "No Drama", a 2019 song by High15
- "No Drama", a 2020 song by Two Friends (DJs)
- "No Drama", a 2021 song by Anxhelina Hadërgjonaj
- "No Drama", a 2021 song by Better Off from the album Self-Titled

== Stage and screen ==
- Nō drama, a drama, a stageplay in the Japanese Nō dramatic art form; see Noh (also spelled "Nō")

=== Television ===
- "No Drama", a 2021 season 3 episode of Jann (TV series)
- "No Drama", a 2022 episode of High School Musical: The Musical: The Series season 3

== People ==
- "No Drama" Adama, a nickname for president of Ghana Adama Barrow
- "No Drama" Obama, a nickname for U.S. president Barack Obama
- "No Drama" Starmer, a nickname for UK prime minister Keir Starmer; see 2024 United Kingdom general election

== Other uses ==
- "No Drama", a Swiss advertising campaign that won the Gold at 2022 Effie Awards, which starred Roger Federer

== See also ==
- Drama (disambiguation)
- No (disambiguation)
- Noh (disambiguation)
