= Nyagzu =

Pasture and campground north of Pangong Lake

Nyagzu ནགས་བཙུགས
- Campsite
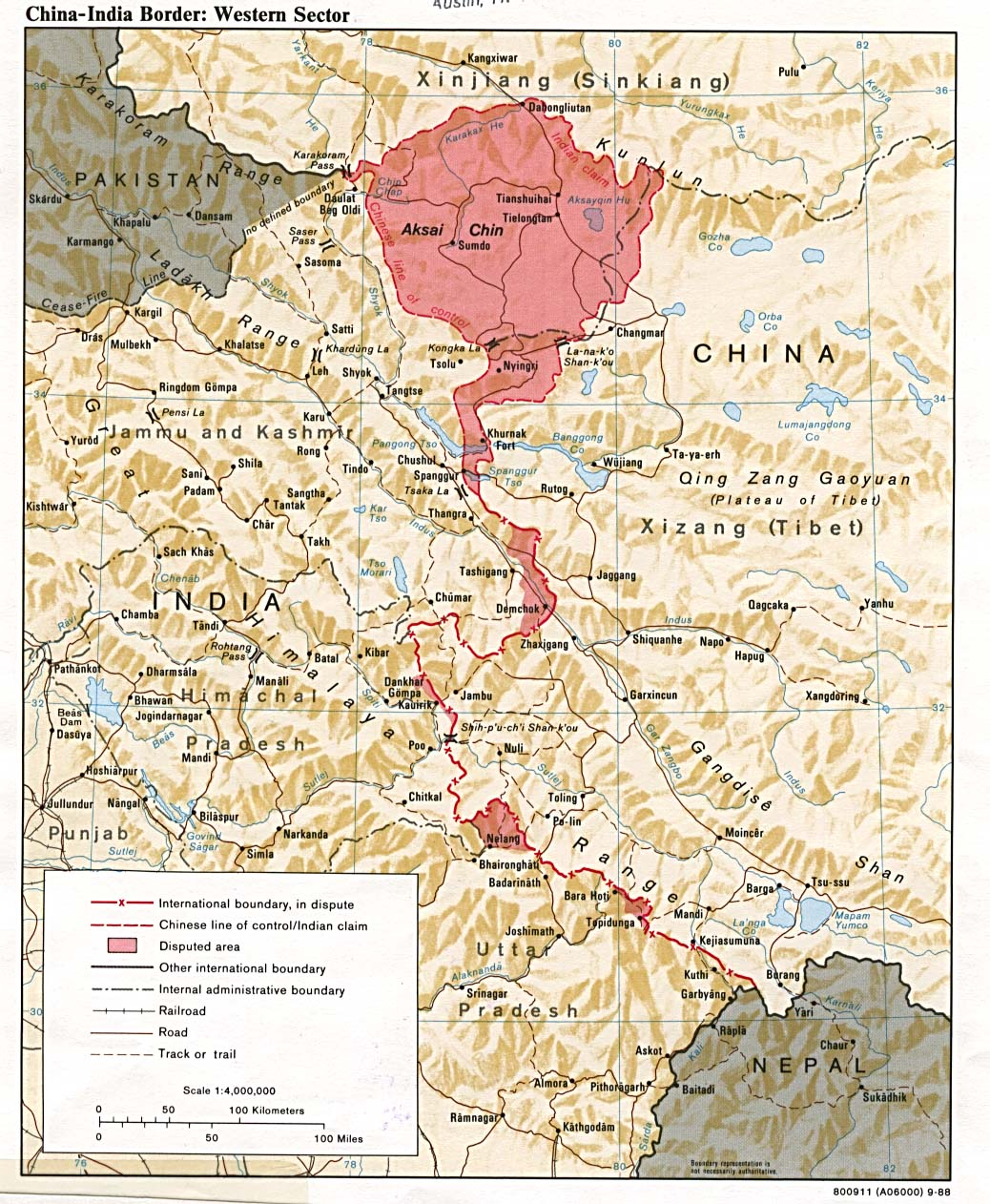
- Interactive map of Nyagzu
- Location within Kashmir Location within Ngari Location within Ladakh
- Coordinates: 34°00′31″N 78°54′19″E
- Country: China
- Region: Tibet
- Prefecture: Ngari Prefecture
- County: Rutog
- Elevation: 4,620 m (15,160 ft)

Nyagzu (Note: Alternative spelling: Niagzu, and "Niazi".) or Nagzug (Tibetan: ནགས་བཙུགས, Wylie: nags btsugs, THL: nak tsuk) is a pasture and campground in the Chumesang river valley to the north of Pangong Lake. It is in territory disputed between India and China, that has been under Chinese administration since 1960–1961.

Nyagzu lies at the location where the Ruang Yogma (Note: Alternative spellings: "Rawang Yogma", and "Lubang Yogma".) stream debauches into the Chumesang river valley, and has been known to have ample vegetation amidst a barren landscape. Multiple sources during the British colonial administration mentioned Nyagzu and the Ruang Yogma stream being the border between Ladakh and Tibet in this region. The Chinese claim line in 1956 can also be seen to follow this border. However, by 1960, China enlarged its claims much further west, and opened military outposts at Nyagzu and at the nearby spot of Dambu Guru.

== Etymology ==
In standard Tibetan, ནགས་ (Wylie: nags) means forest, and བཙུགས་ (Wylie: btsugs) has meanings such as "planted", "established" and "raised" etc.

== Geography ==
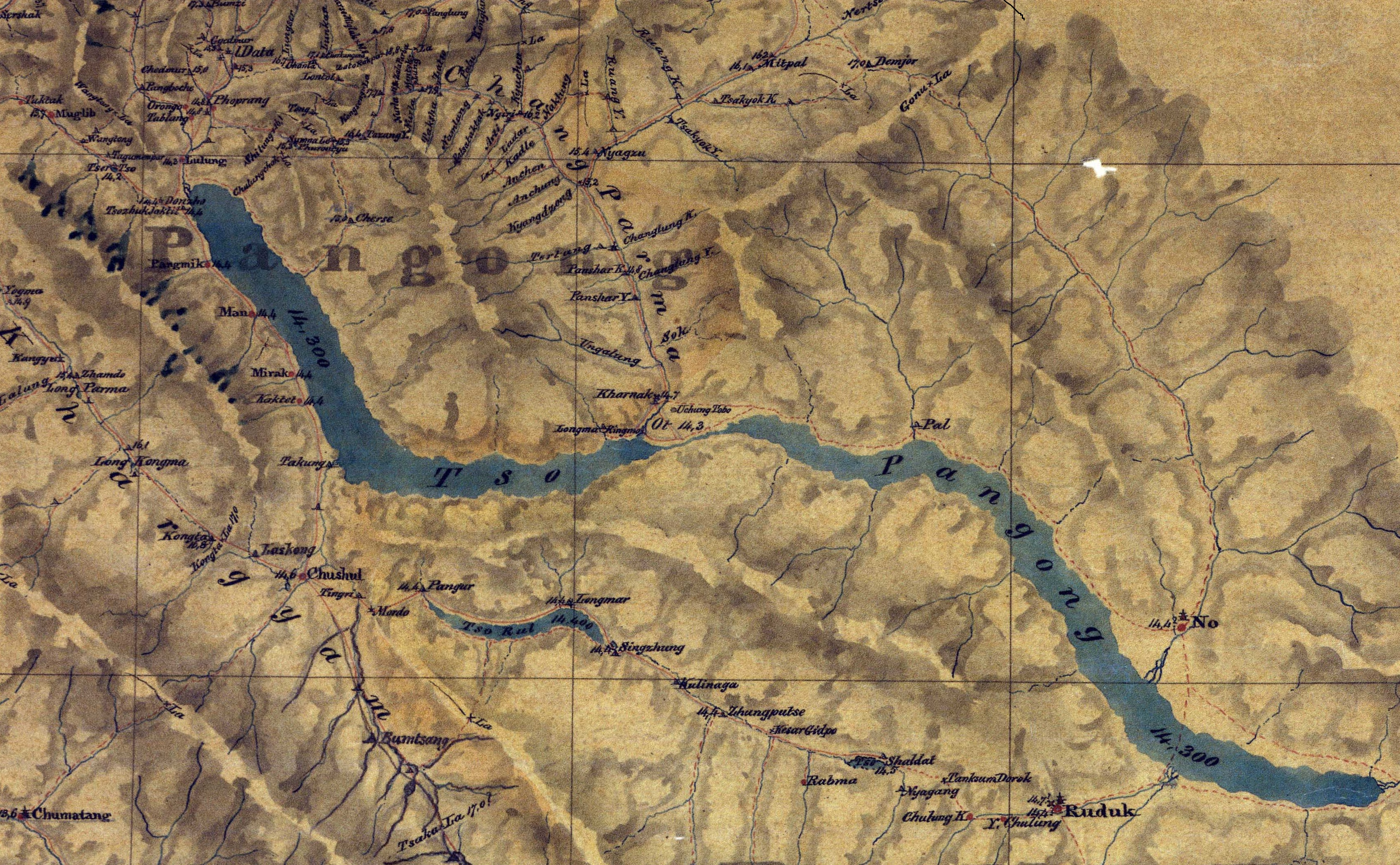
Map 1: Pangong Lake mapped by Henry Strachey (Note: Henry Strachey was an officer of the British Indian Army, who was noted for his independent exploration effort. In 1947, he was included as a commissioner in a Kashmir Boundary Commission headed by Alexander Cunningham.) in 1851. Ladakh–Rudok border shown by a faint orange colour wash. (Note: Henry Strachey explored the frontier of Ladakh as part of the British boundary commission for the princely state of Jammu and Kashmir in 1847. The extensive local knowledge gathered by him is published in Physical Geography of Western Tibet in 1951. His boundary commissioner's report is only available in Government archives.)

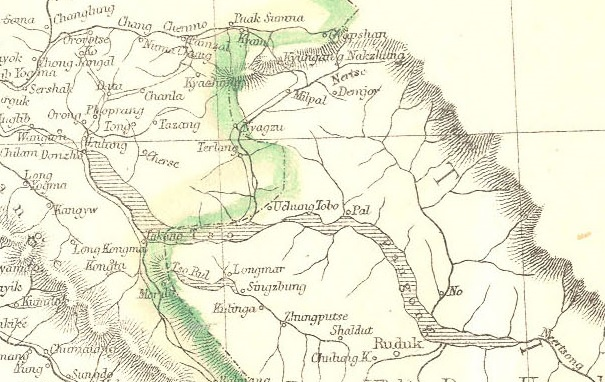
Map 2: An Edward Weller map of Ladakh in 1863 indicates the border marked by the Boundary Commission.

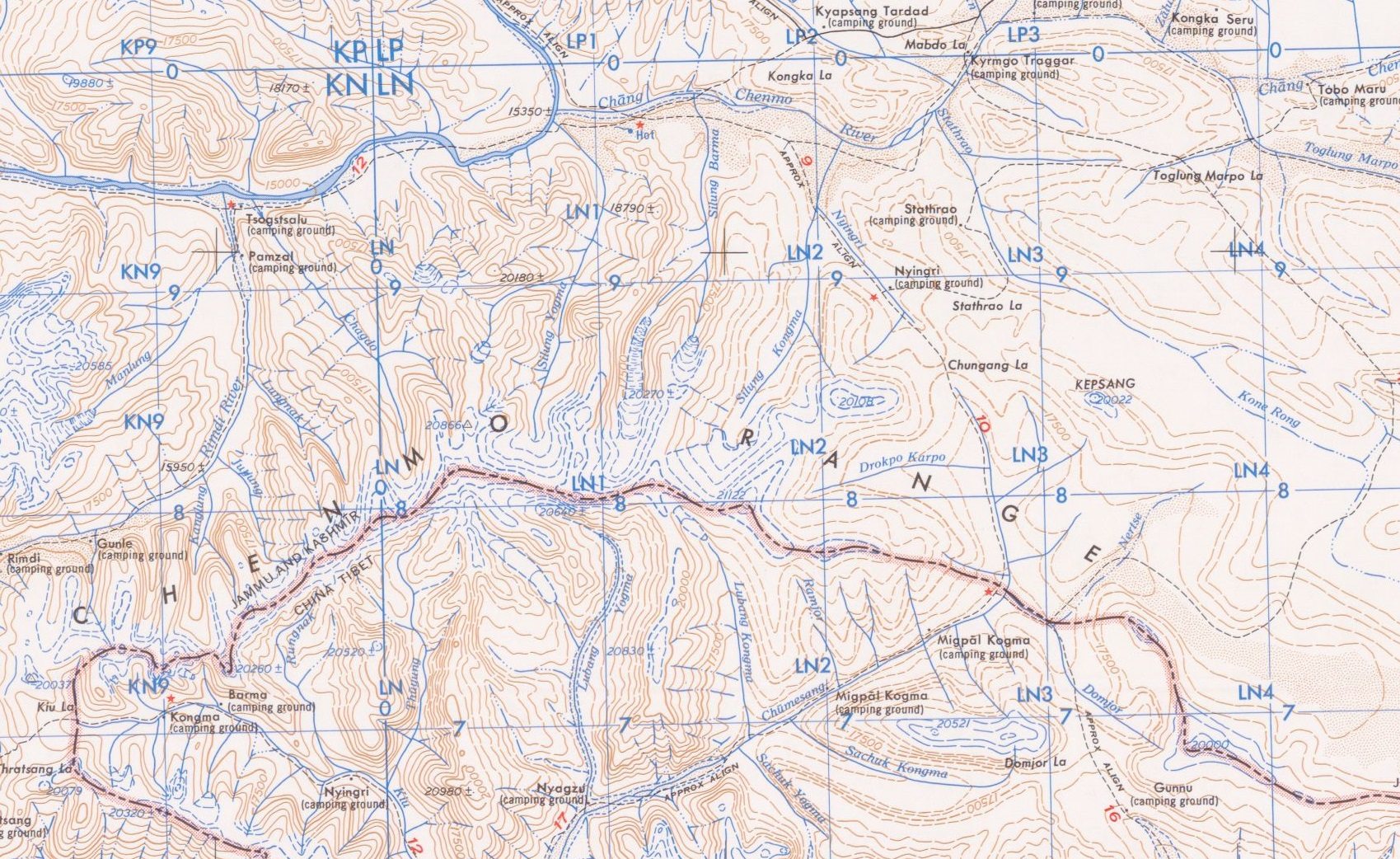
Map 3: Chumesang River Valley (AMS, 1955) (Note: From map: "THE DELINEATION OF INTERNATIONAL BOUNDARIES ON THIS MAP MUST NOT BE CONSIDERED AUTHORITATIVE")

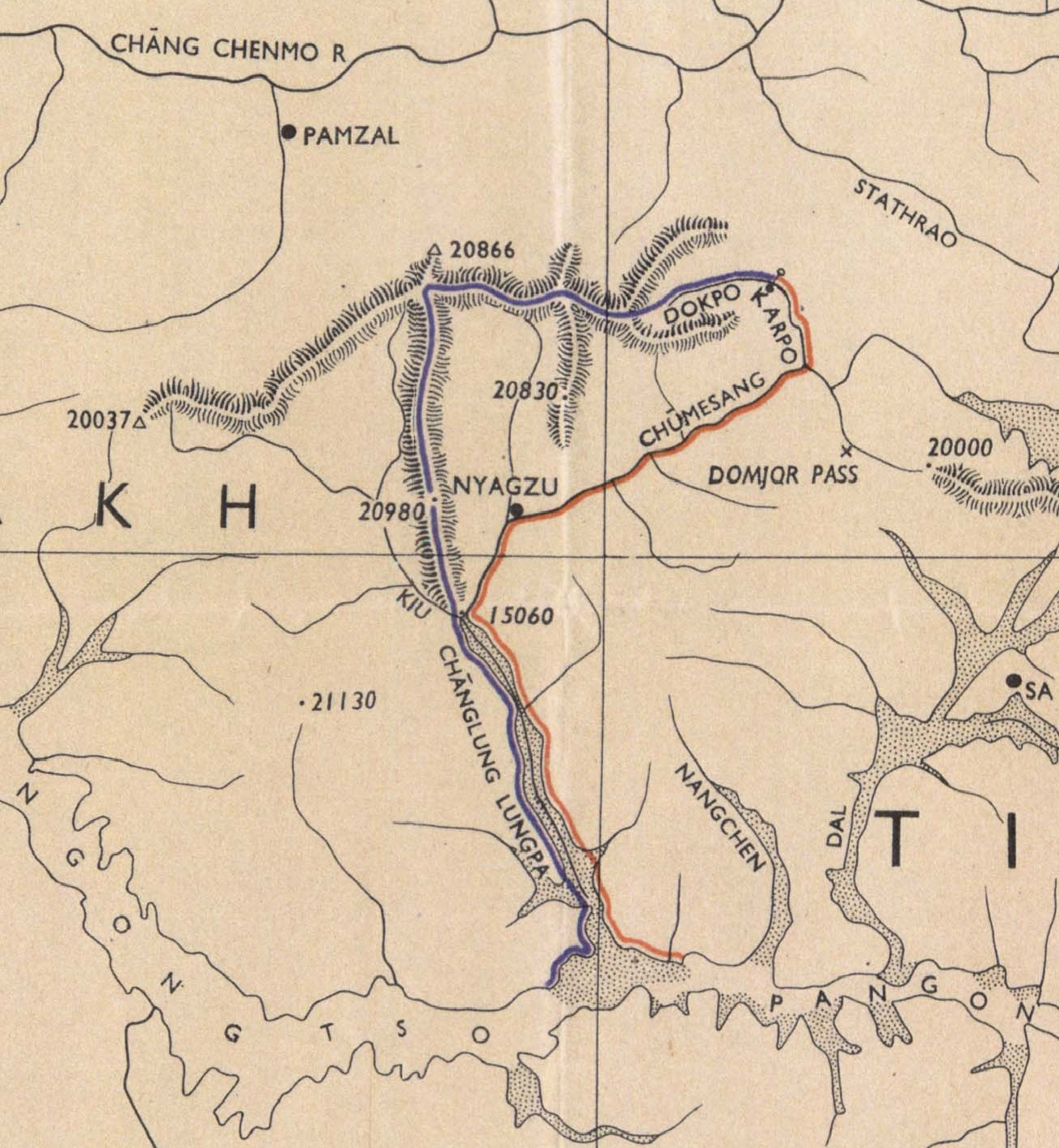
Map 4: Map of the Dokpo Karpo dispute—Tibetan claimed border in blue and the Ladakhi claimed border in orange (Hugh Richardson, 1945)

The Panggong Lake is divided in its middle by the Khurnak Plain, which juts into the lake and reduces it to a narrow channel of 50 yards width. The section of the lake to the west of this point has been traditionally called Panggong Tso by the Ladakhis, and the section to the east has been called Tso Ngombo and other names by the Tibetans.

The Khurnak plain is formed from the alluvium brought by two rivers, Kiu Chu that flows from the west and Chumesang that flows from the east, which join together at Dambu Guru and flow through the Changlung Lungpa valley to reach the Khurnak Plain. (Note: It is a convention in the Tibetan language to use the name of the valley for the river that flows through it.) The name "Dambu Guru" was not marked on the 19th century maps, but was mentioned early in the 20th century. Trotter called it "Mandal" in 1877.

Nyagzu lies in the Chumesang valley, about 4 kilometres northeast of Dambu Guru. At Nyagzu, a stream called Ruang Yogma (or Rawang Yogma) flows from the north and falls into the Chumesang valley. The alluvium brought by the stream creates a rich pasture at Nyagzu, with grass and "brushwood" growing in it. It is "abounding in hares", according to a traveller, with antelope and kiang residing in adjacent valleys. It is a "warm spot", with birds singing on the branches of shrubs. It seemed like the "threshold of paradise" to a traveller returning from the barren highlands of Tibet. Nain Singh, who called the location "Rawang Yokma" (by the name of the stream), mentioned that the names of the trees as changma (willow), shukpa (pencil cedar), and womphu (tamarisk).

Another pasture is formed downstream closer to Dambu Guru, where the Ruang Yogma stream actually joins the Chumesang river. (Ruang Yogma flows parallel to Chumesang for some distance before actually joining it near Dambu Guru.) Tibetans appear to call this lower pasture as Nyagzu. The Chinese also follow this terminology, setting up their Nyagzu Post (pinyin: Ní yǎ gé zǔ shàosuǒ) at Dambu Guru itself.

The Chumesang river is joined by two large streams (Ruang Yogma and Ruang Kongma) and several small streams flowing from the north. Two other pastures are formed by these streams which go by the name Migpal (Tibetan: མིག་པ, Wylie: mig pa, THL: mik pa), called "Migpal Yogma" and "Migpal Kongma" respectively. Tibetan border guards were apparently stationed here in the 19th century to bar foreigners from entering the Rudok territory. However, there seems to have been no bar on them travelling north along the Chumesang valley to go to Chang Chenmo Valley and Kyam.

=== Border point ===
Nyagzu itself was described as the border between Ladakh and Tibet by a number of travellers. The native explorer ("pundit") Nain Singh passed through here in 1874 on his way to Tibet. He described the Ruang Yogma stream as the boundary between the two states with the west bank of the stream belonging to Ladakh and the east bank belonging to Tibet. Surveyor Henry Trotter narrated this fact with some amazement since the Survey of India maps showed the border considerably to the west of the location. (Note: It is unclear how and why the border shown on the Survey of India maps was decided.) He also mentioned that Walker's map that accompanied Alexander Cunningham's book Ladakh showed Nyagzu as the boundary. Montagu Sinclair Wellby who travelled to Tibetan highlands from Ladakh passed through Nyagzu in 1898. He described it as "a place well worthy of note, for it neither lies in Ladakh nor in Tibet".

=== Trade routes ===
Nyagzu lay on a trade route between Ladakh and Rudok. Travellers crossed into the Khurnak Plain watershed at Kiu La or Ane La and came down to Dambu Guru via the Kiu Chu valley. At Dambu Guru they switched to the Chumesang river valley and, after passing through Nyagzu, Migpal Yogma and Migpal Kongma, turned right to follow a route via Domjor La and Dingo La to reach a plain called Pal on the bank of Pangong Lake. A lake shore route took them to the village of Noh (or Wujang). Another route went via the valleys of Nertse and Kone Rong over a pass called Kone La.

Nain Singh mentioned a large party of Tangtse (Note: Tangtse was also used as the name of the entire district that covered the Pangong Lake region.) villagers returning from Rudok with wool and salt. Fernand Grenard found here a caravan of Tibetan traders from Rudok, who were taking salt to Ladakh to exchange it for flour, barley, and other items. A round trip journey was said to take them four months. It was considered acceptable because they could not grow grain for themselves.

== History ==
The modern-era Ladakh–Tibet border came into being after the Tibet–Ladakh–Mughal War and the ensuing Treaty of Tingmosgang agreed between Ladakh and Tibet. Through these developments, according to scholars, the Rudok district (modern day Rutog County), which had been part of Ladakh since its inception in c. 930, was annexed to Tibet. Alexander Cunningham reported that the boundary was marked by piles of stones after the withdrawal of the Tibetan troops. But this demarcation is now lost to history and the prevailing border was inferred by the British administrators after the formation of the princely state of Jammu and Kashmir in 1846.

In 1847, the British appointed a boundary commission with Cunningham, Henry Strachey and Thomas Thomson for demarcating the boundary between Ladakh and Tibet in association with boundary commissioners expected from Tibet. However, Tibet did not send its own commissioners. In their absence, the British commissioners documented whatever they learnt from their own investigations.

The border marked by Henry Strachey (Maps 1 and 2) passes by the Khurnak Plain and Nyagzu. It allocates Khurnak Plain to Tibet, but the rest of the Changlung Lungpa valley to Ladakh (by passing over the eastern watershed of this valley), and drops down to the valley at Nyagzu. From Nyagzu, it runs north on a presumed ridgeline to the northern watershed of Chumesang, and then runs east on the watershed through Kyungang La to Lanak La. The Trigonometrical Survey of India also compiled a map from all the explorations of the boundary commissioners, which was published along with Cunningham's book titled Ladak.

Strachey's map (Map 1) suggests that he might have travelled to the region from Kyam via Kyungang La. And, after exploring Changlung Lungpa and Khurnak Plain, he returned via Kiu La. His map shows considerable detail of the region with numerous streams marked and labelled, indicating the close familiarity of his Ladakhi informants with the terrain.

It is known from later explorations that the Khurnak Plain was used by the residents of Noh (in Rudok district) as a winter pasture. It appears that Tibet asserted its right to the pasture by building the Khurnak Fort in this plain, possibly to thwart any attempt by the Ladakhis to cross the lake at that point. The Ladakhis had access to the region above the plain through numerous passes on the north side of the lake, and thus the Changlung Lungpa valley was maintained as the effective boundary between the two sides. By the time of the British arrival on the scene, the fort itself was in ruins but the customary boundary seems to have been well-respected. In addition to Strachey, numerous other explorers including Nain Singh, Wellby, Deasy and Grenard, observed the boundary in effect.

However, by early 20th century, this consensus appears to have gotten diluted. Godwin-Austen observed already in 1867 that the Ladakhis were claiming the Khurnak Plain with backing from the Kashmir authorities. In later times, the Ladakhis appear to have extended their claims to the entire Chumesang valley up to Kyungang La. A side valley of Chumesang called Dokpo Karpo came into dispute in 1918, when the Tibetans arrested a Kashmiri subject there, turning it into an international dispute that required British mediation. The two sides met in 1924 and advanced their respective claims. It transpired that both the sides claimed the Khurnak Plain, Changlung Lungpa valley, the Chumesang valley and the Dokpo Karpo valley (Map 4). No agreement was reached but the British let the dispute die down.

== Sino-Indian border dispute ==
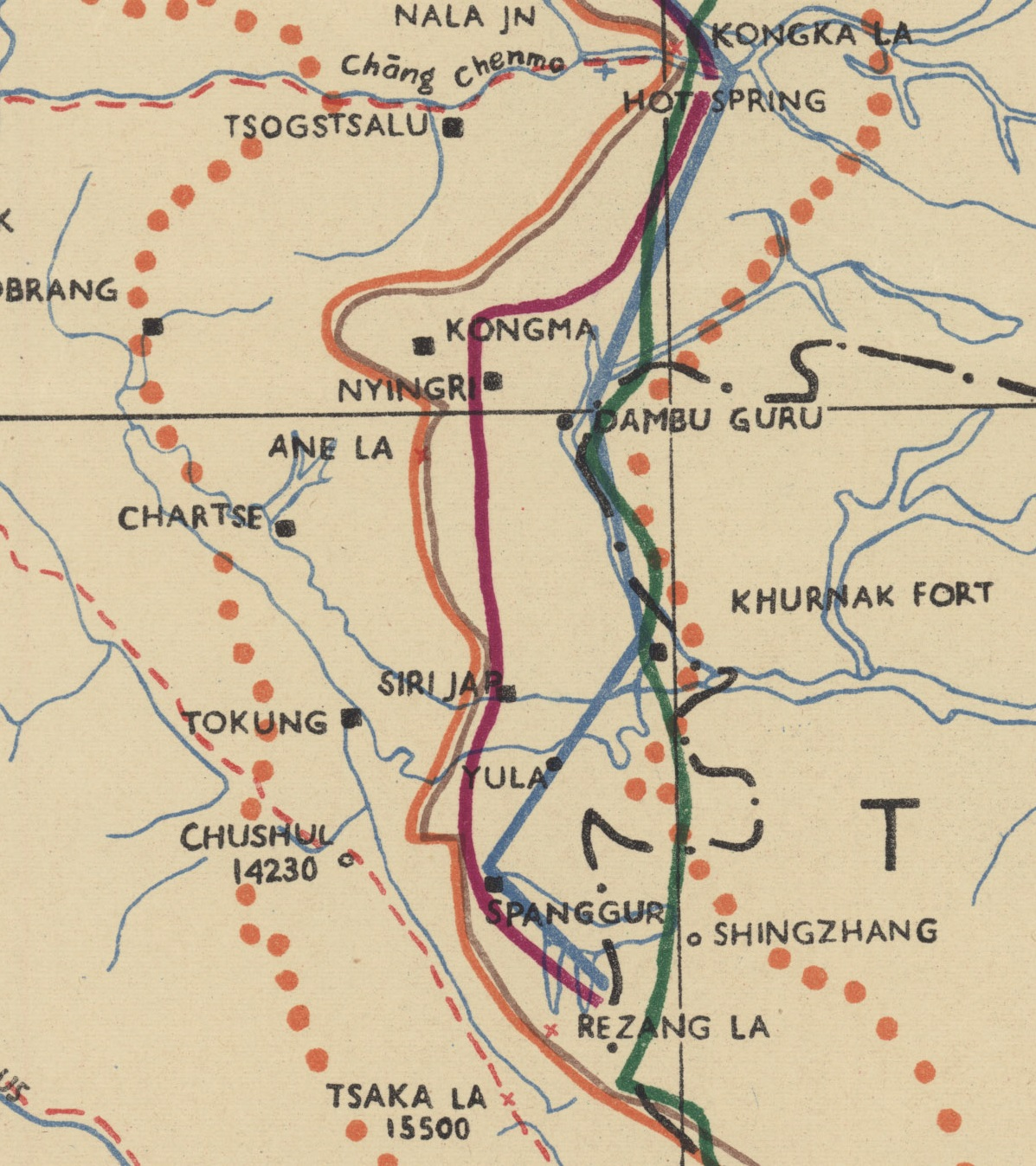
Map 5: Chinese border claims–1956 claim in green, 1960 claim in dark brown; Indian border claim in black (US Army, 1962)

India defined its border in 1954, which reflects the Ladakhi claims made in the Dokpo Karpo dispute, but it leaves the Chumesang valley near Nyagzu to follow a watershed boundary in heading to Lanak La (Map 5). China published its border claim in 1956 in the "Big Map of the People's Republic of China", which is similar to Strachey's border up to Nyagzu, and then headed north to Kongka La (Map 5). (Note: This border is similar to Strachey's border in that it allocates the Khurnak Plain to Tibet, a good part of the Changlung Lungpa valley to Ladakh, but drops down to the valley at Dambu Guru (which is "Nyagzu" in Tibetan terminology) and then follows the Ruang Yogma stream north. At the source of Ruang Yogma, Strachey's border followed the watershed ridge line to Lanak La, whereas this border crosses the ridge line and heads to Kongka La.) This border was described by Premier Zhou Enlai as "correctly showing" the traditional boundary of China.

However, when Indian and Chinese officials met to conduct border negotiations in 1960, the Chinese negotiators unveiled a new border claiming additional territory to the west. Instead of connecting to the Khurnak Plain, the new border traced the western watershed of the Changlung Lungpa river, through Kiu La and Ane La and headed south to the Sirijap plain. (Map 5–Brown line) When the difference between the two borders was pointed out, the Chinese negotiators first dismissed them as trivial, and then took the position that both the maps were equally valid.

According to the Indian Intelligence Bureau chief, the Chinese occupied the Khurnak Fort area in 1959 and then prevented Ladakhi graziers from going to Dambu Guru and Nyagzu. In 1960 they opened posts at the two locations.

== Map gallery ==
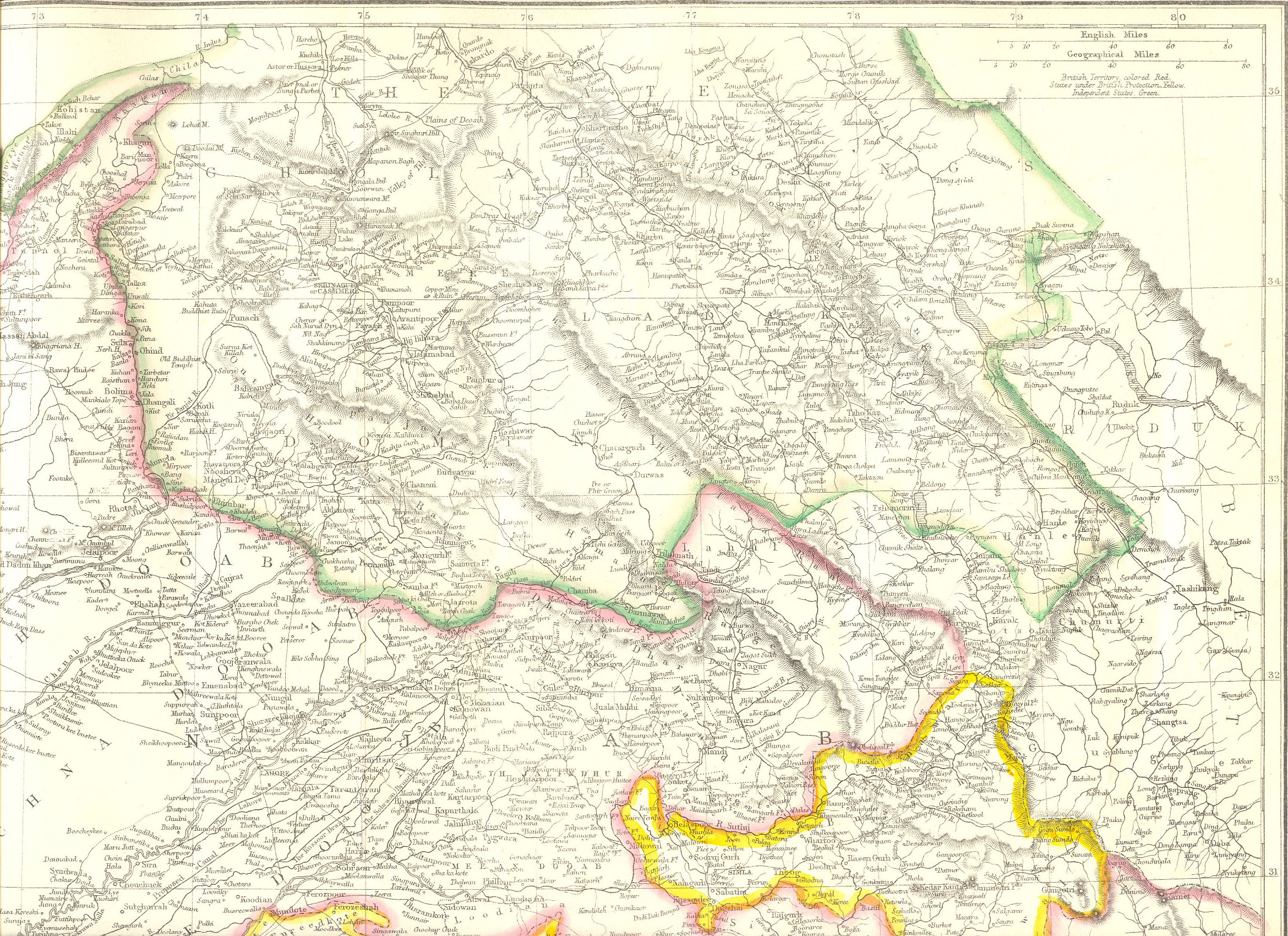
Edward Weller map of Ladakh and Garhwal, 1863

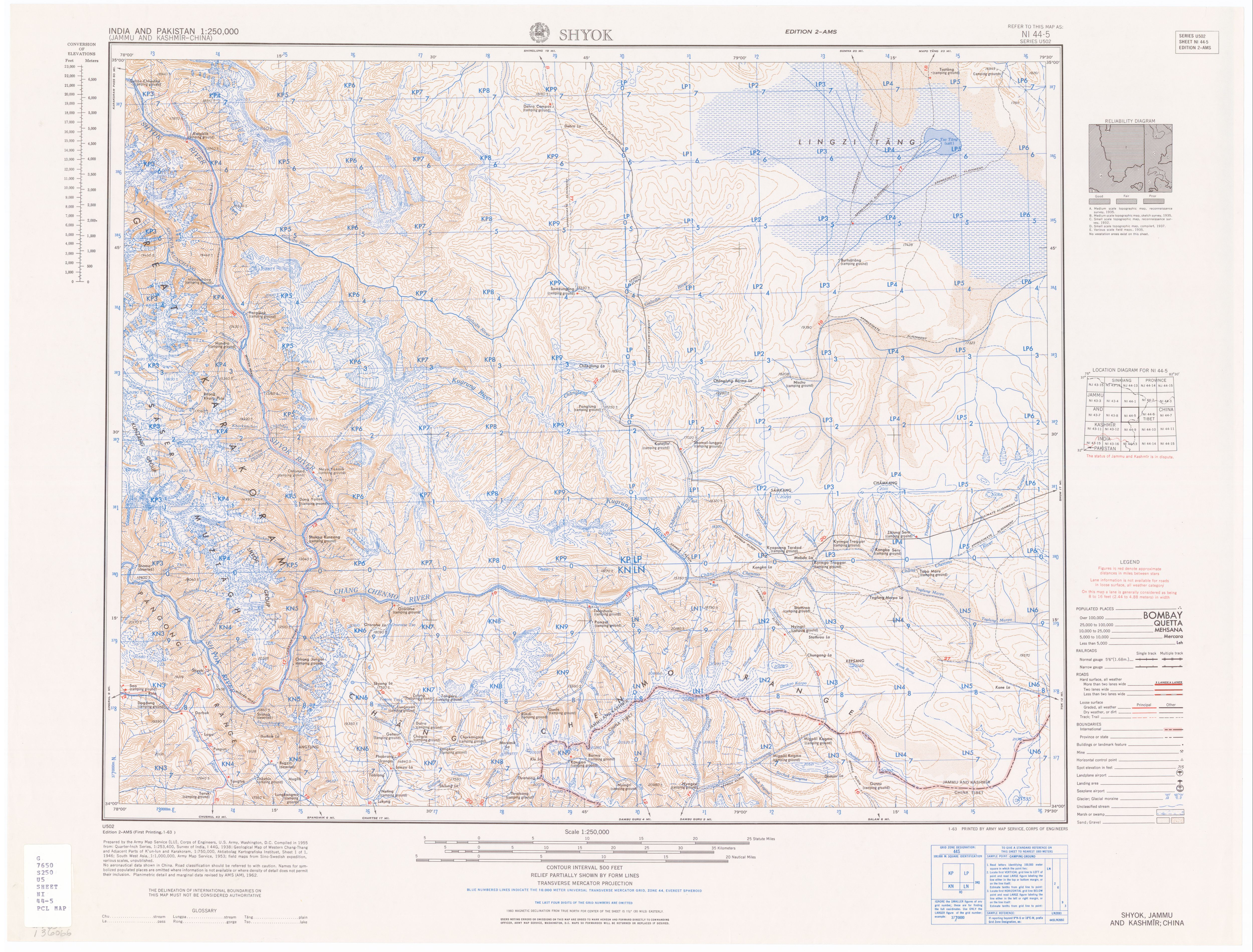
Map including Nyagzu (AMS, 1954)(AMS, 1954)

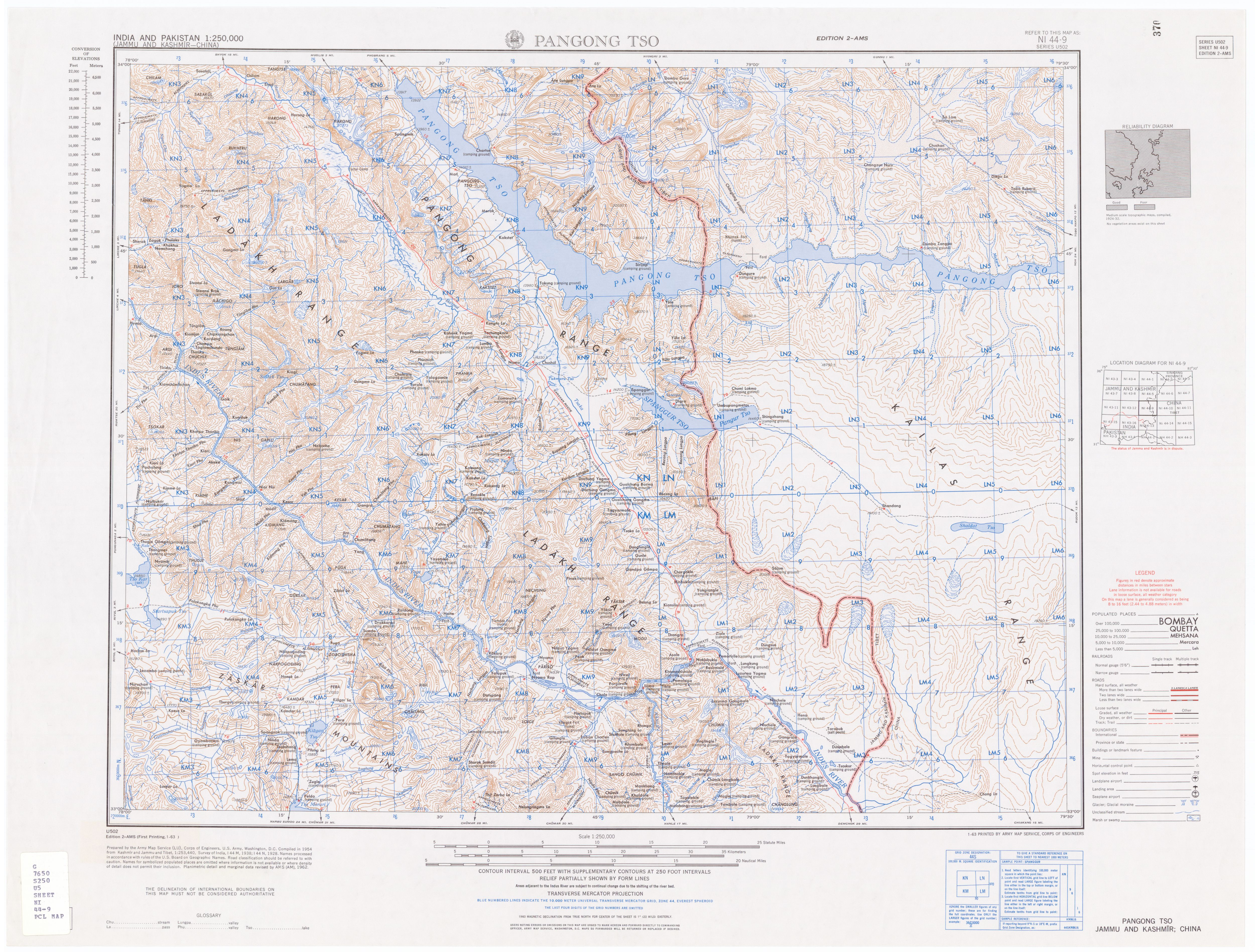
Map including Khurnak Fort (AMS, 1954)

== See also ==
- List of locations in Aksai Chin

== Bibliography ==
Explorers' works

- Deasy, H. H. P. (1901), In Tibet and Chinese Turkestan being the Record of Three Years' Exploration, New York: Longmans, Green & Co. – via archive.org
- Godwin-Austen, H. H (1867). "Notes on the Pangong Lake District of Ladakh, from a Journal Made during a Survey in 1863". Journal of the Royal Geographical Society of London. 37: 343–363. doi:10.2307/1798534. JSTOR 1798534.
- Grenard, Fernand (1904), Tibet, Hutchinson & Co
- Hedin, Sven (1907), Scientific Results of a Journey in Central Asia, 1899–1902, Vol. IV: Central and West Tibet, Stockholm: Lithographic Institute of the General Staff of the Swedish Army – via archive.org
- Strachey, Henry (1854), Physical Geography of Western Tibet, London: William Clows and Sons – via archive.org
- Trotter, H (1877), "Account of the Pundit's Journey in Great Tibet from Leh in Ladakh to Lhasa, and of his Return to India via Assam", The Journal of the Royal Geographical Society, 47: 86–136, doi:10.2307/1798740, JSTOR 1798740 – via archive.org
- Ward, A. E. (1896), The Tourist's and Sportsman's guide to Kashmir and Ladak, Thaker, Spink & Co – via archive.org
- Wellby, M. S. (September 1898), "Through Tibet to China", Geographical Journal, 12 (3): 262–280 – via archive.org
- Wellby, Montagu Sinclair (1898), Through Unknown Tibet, Philadelphia: J. B. Lippincott Company – via archive.org

General sources

- Gazetteer of Kashmir and Ladak, Calcutta: Superintendent of Government Printing, 1890 – via archive.org
- Fisher, Margaret W.; Rose, Leo E.; Huttenback, Robert A. (1963), Himalayan Battleground: Sino-Indian Rivalry in Ladakh, Praeger – via archive.org
- Lamb, Alastair (1964), The China-India border, Oxford University Press – via archive.org
- Lamb, Alastair (1989), Tibet, China & India, 1914-1950: a history of imperial diplomacy, Roxford Books
- Mason, Kenneth (1929), Routes in the Western Himalaya, Kashmir Etc., Vol. I, Calcutta: Government of India Press – via archive.org
- Mullik, B. N. (1971), My Years with Nehru: The Chinese Betrayal, Allied Publishers – via archive.org
- Kaul, Hriday Nath (2003). India China Boundary in Kashmir. Gyan Publishing House. ISBN 978-81-212-0826-0.
- Petech, Luciano (1977), The Kingdom of Ladakh, c. 950–1842 A.D., Instituto Italiano Per il Medio ed Estremo Oriente – via archive.org
- Ramachandran, K. N (20 June 1981), "Dimensions of Sino-Indian Relations", Mainstream Weekly
- Sinha, P.B; Athale, A.A (1992), S. N. Prasad (ed.), History of the Conflict with China, 1962 (PDF), History Division, Ministry of Defence, Government of India
- Woodman, Dorothy (1969), Himalayan Frontiers: A Political Review of British, Chinese, Indian, and Russian Rivalries, Praeger – via archive.org
