= Phursook Bay =

Bay on the China-India border

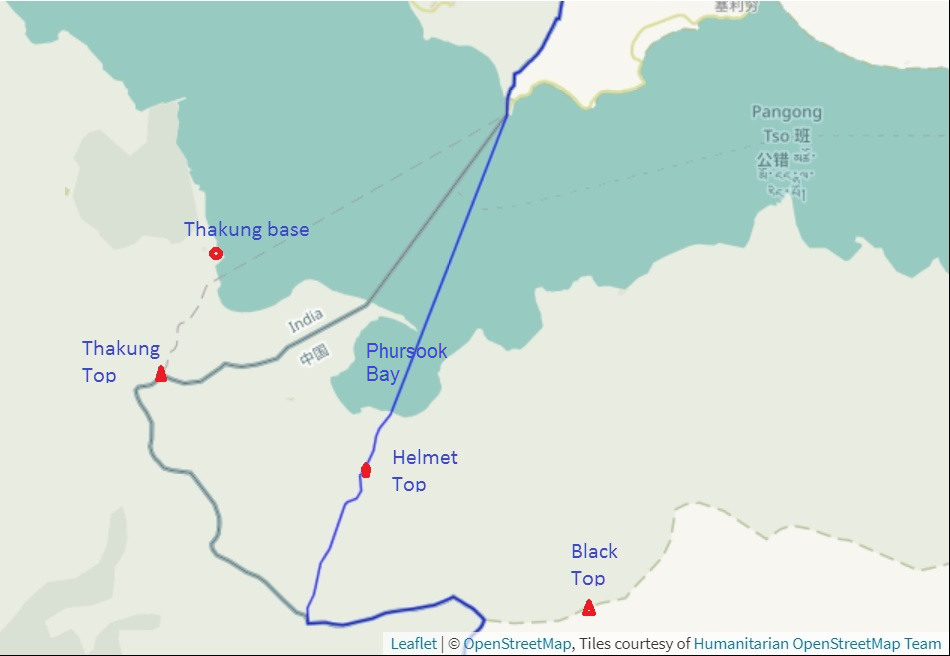
- Contested China–India border near the Phursook Bay (Note: The blue line that through the bay is the Line of Actual Control between India and China, as marked by the US Office of Geographer in 2013. The green line was the line claimed by China in August 2020, and the faint green line was an attempt to enlarge the claim close to the Thakung plain.)

- Location of the Phursook Bay in the Kashmir region
- Location: Ladakh (India) and Rutog County (Tibet, China)
- Coordinates: 33.67°N 78.735°E
- Type: bay
- Part of: Pangong Tso
- Salinity: salt
- Surface elevation: 4,225 metres (13,862 ft)
- Frozen: during winter

Phursook Bay (Chinese: 普尔楚; pinyin: Pǔ'ěr chǔ) is a bay in the Pangong Tso that is said to have formed the border between Ladakh and Tibet's Rutog County during the British Raj. The present day Line of Actual Control between China and India runs near the same location and remains fiercely contested.

== Geography ==
The Phursook Bay was described by the British surveyor H. H. Godwin-Austen in 1867 in his notes on the Pangong Lake district. Traversing the southern shore of the lake, he arrived at the plain of Thakung, where the Chushul River joins the lake, found a bay at its southeastern corner, then a low spur abutting on the lake and then another large bay. It is called Phursook and is said to form the boundary between the princely state of Jammu and Kashmir and the district of Rudok. His description continued:

Phursook formed a circular, sheltered little lake in itself. A narrow strait only connects it with the water outside. It was evidently of great depth in places where the hills came down in cliffs upon it; a narrow beach ran along the foot of these, formed of talus cemented by lime. The bay formed a perfect harbour, in which a line-of-battle ship might have floated, and sailed in and out of it. Were this lake in a less elevated region, or on a line of trade, how useful would the water-communication prove up and down the extent of its two long portions.

Henry Strachey had traversed the same region earlier in 1847 as a boundary commissioner for Kashmir. He drew the frontier between Kashmir and Rudok at the same location. After crossing the lake at this location, his frontier line hugged the northern shore of the lake and ran east until the Khurnak Plain. The narrow channel at the Khurnak Plain was included entirely within Tibet. (Maps 1 and 2)

== Historical maps ==
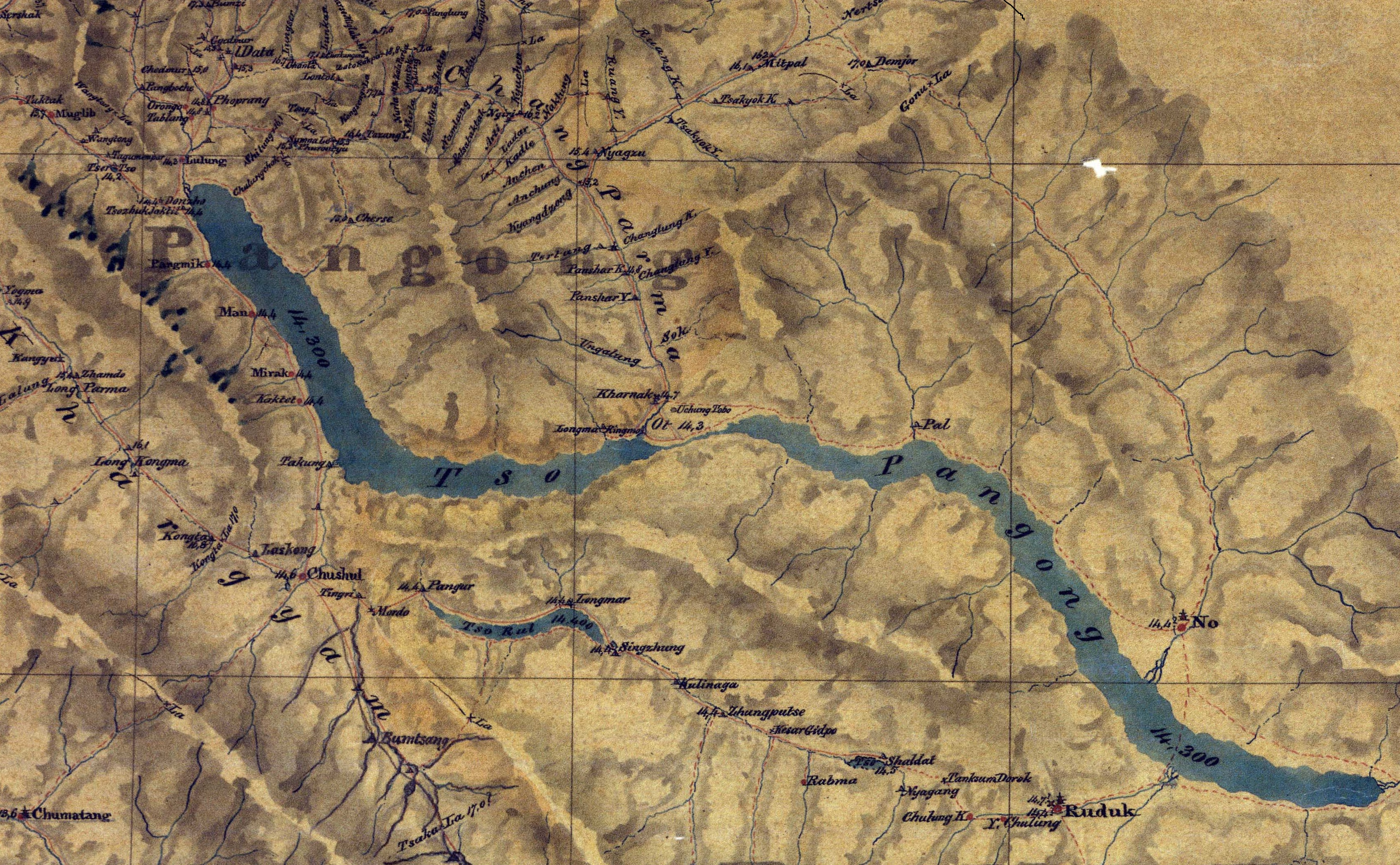
Map1: Boundary between Kashmir and Rudok shown as a faint orange colour wash in the map of Henry Strachey (1851)

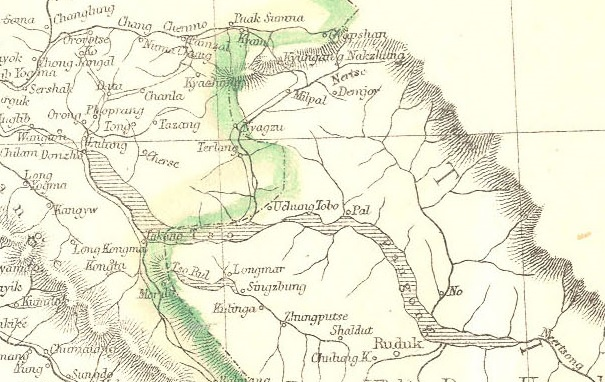
Map 2: The frontier depicted in a map by Edward Weller (1863)
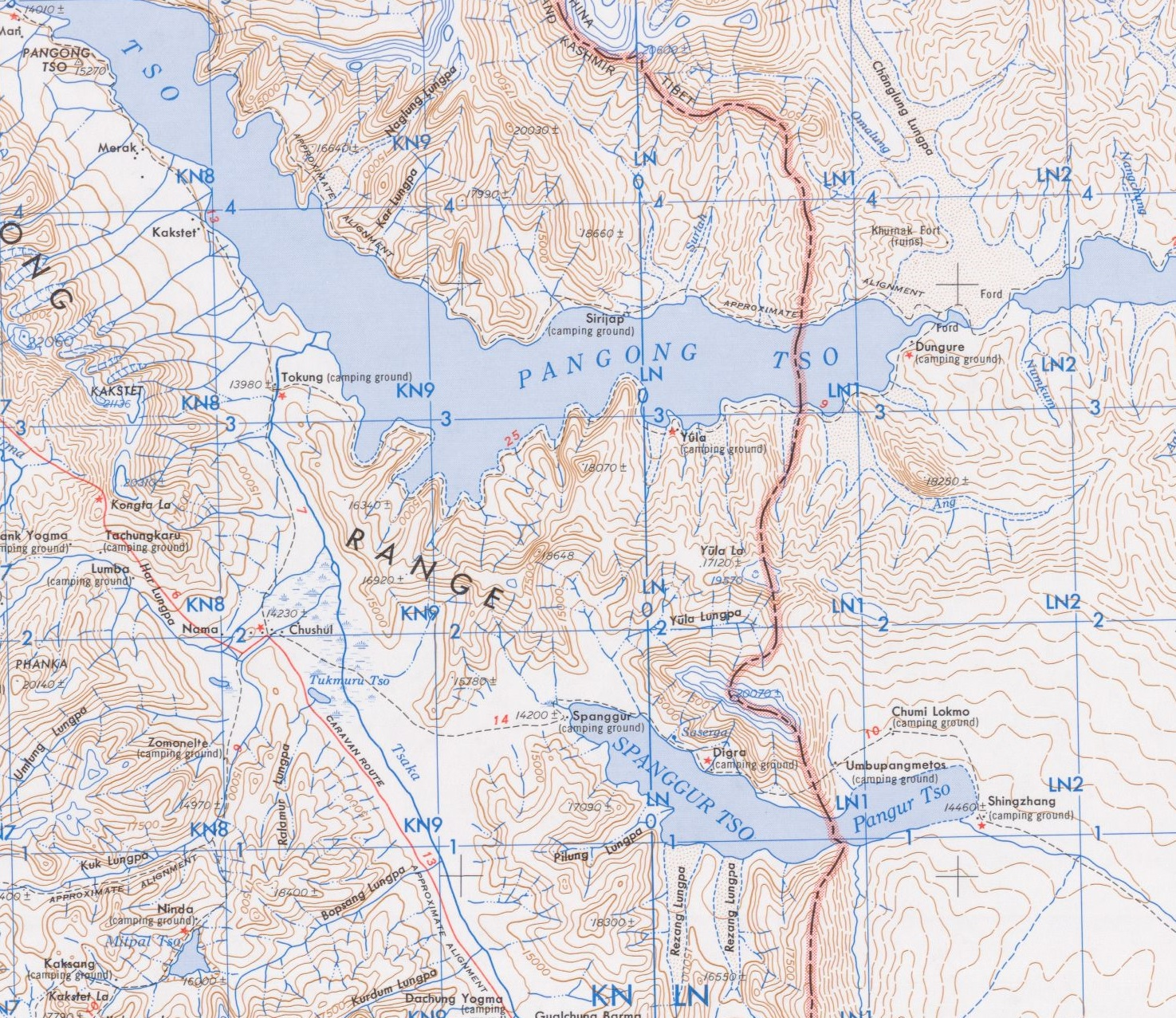
Map 3: China-India border after the Kashmir Survey (AMS, 1954)

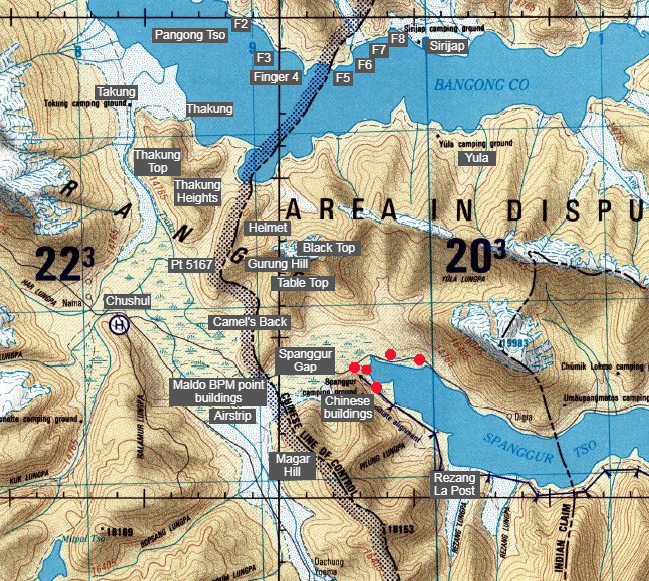
Map 4: The Line of Actual Control between China and India (DMA, 1992)

== Bibliography ==
- Godwin-Austen, H. H. (1867), "Notes on the Pangong Lake District of Ladakh, from a Journal made during a Survey in 1863", The Journal of the Royal Geographical Society of London, 37, London: J. Murray: 343–363, doi:10.2307/1798534, JSTOR 1798534
