= No Creek =

No Creek may refer to:

- No Creek (Kentucky), a stream in Ohio County
- No Creek (Missouri), a stream in Livingston and Grundy counties
