= Chang Chenmo Kangri =

Mountain peak in Ladakh, India

- Location within India Location within Ladakh

Highest point
- Elevation: 6,536 m (21,444 ft)
- Prominence: 1,232 m (4,042 ft)
- Coordinates: 34°13′27.95″N 78°39′30.39″E

Geography
- Location: Ladakh

Chang Chenmo Kangri is a mountain peak located at 6,536 m (21,444 ft) above sea level in the easternmost subrange of the Karakoram range in Ladakh, India.

== Etymology ==
The name Chang Chenmo means "Great Northern" in Tibetic languages. Kangri means "snow mountain".

== Location ==
The peak is located south-west of Tsogstsalu, a campsite and the location of an Indian border outpost on the banks of Chang Chenmo River.

== Ascents ==
=== First civilian ascent ===
On 11 September 2026, 9 members of Sonarpur Arohi, a mountaineering club from Sonarpur, near Kolkata, reached the summit via a new route. They also made the first ascent of 3 nearby peaks of heights 6,400 m, 6,420 m and 6,274 m. All the climbs were done in alpine style without high-altitude porters and fixed ropes.
