= Nuo =

Nuo, NUO or nuo may refer to:

- Nuo folk religion, a variant of Chinese folk religion
- Nuo opera or Nuo drama, a Chinese folk opera and ritual performance
- Nguồn language, spoken in Vietnam and Laos (ISO 639 code nuo)
- Patrick Nuo, a Swiss singer, songwriter and model

== See also ==
- Nou (disambiguation)
