= No, No, No =

No, No, No or other variations may refer to:

== Music ==
- NoNoNo (band), a Swedish dance-pop trio

=== Albums ===
- No No No (Beirut album), 2015
- No, No, No (Dawn Penn album), 1994
- No No No (compilation), a garage rock compilation album released in 1998

=== Songs ===
- "No No No" (Apink song), 2013
- "No, No, No" (Destiny's Child song), 1997
- "No, No, No" (Ted Nugent song), 1982
- "No, no, no" (Thalía song), 2006
- "No, No, No" (Yoko Ono song), 1981
- "Can Anyone Explain? (No! No! No!)", a 1950 song by Bennie Benjamin and George David Weiss
- "You Don't Love Me (No, No, No)", a 1994 song by Dawn Penn
- "No, No, No", a 1956 song by James Brown
- "No, No, No", a 1965 song by Crispian St. Peters
- "No, No, No", a song by Eve from her 2001 album Scorpion
- "No, No, No", a song by Kiss from their 1987 album Crazy Nights
- "No No No", a song by Deep Purple from their 1971 album Fireball
- "No No No", a song by Def Leppard from their 1981 album High 'n' Dry
- "No No No", a song by Yeah Yeah Yeahs from their 2003 album Fever to Tell
- "No No No", a 2016 song made by TheFatRat
- "No No No", a 2020 song by Flipp Dinero featuring A Boogie Wit Da Hoodie

== Other uses ==
- "No No No", also known as "N3", a large alliance of players in the video game Ark: Survival Evolved
- "No. No. No." (speech), quote by Margaret Thatcher

== See also ==
- No (disambiguation)
