= Marsimik La =

Mountain pass

- Location within Ladakh Location within India
- Elevation: 5,582 metres (18,314 ft)

Third Approach
- Location: Ladakh, India
- Range: Himalaya
- Coordinates: 34°05′36″N 78°37′04″E

Marsimik La or Marsemik La, also called Lankar La, elevation 5,582 metres (18,314 ft) is a high mountain pass in the Chang Chenmo Range in the Indian union territory of Ladakh, 96 km (60 mi) east of Leh as the crow flies. Ladakh's route to the Chang Chenmo Valley traverses the pass.

== Geography ==
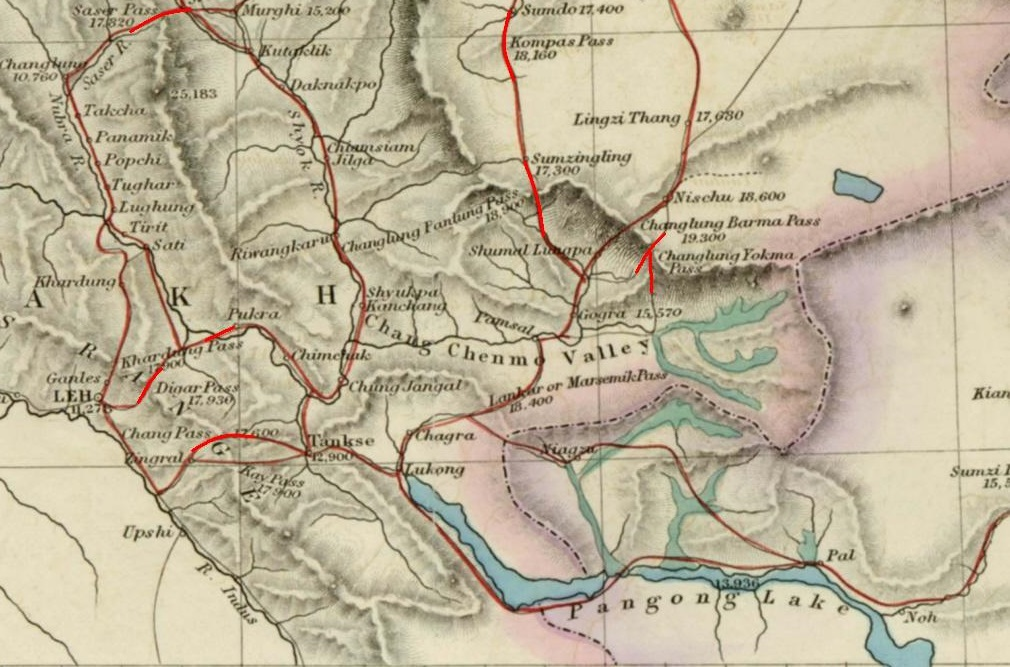
Trade routes of Ladakh (1878)

Marsimik La is located about 20 km (10 mi) northeast of Lukung at the tip of Pangong Lake, and 15 km (9 mi) southwest of Pamzal in the Chang Chenmo Valley. The ridge line of Marsimik La divides the basin of the Pangong Lake from the Chang Chenmo River.

The description of Marsimik La in the Gazetteer of Kashmir and Ladak (1890) states:

This pass, though very high, is by no means difficult in summer. It is free from glaciers, and generally clear of snow during the summer and early autumn.

About 4 km to the east of Marsimik La is another ridge line which divides the western portion of the Pangong Lake basin with the central portion that drains into the lake via the Khurnak Plain. China's claimed border and the present Line of Actual Control runs through this ridge line. The passes Kiu La (Tibetan: རྒྱ་ལ, Wylie: rgya la, THL: gya la) and Ane La (Tibetan: ཨན་ལ, Wylie: an la, THL: en la) lie on this ridge line. The river Kiu Chu flows down from Kiu La and joins Chumesang River at Dambu Guru, the combined river flowing through Changlung Lungpa to drain into the Pangong Lake.

== Transportation ==
The "Phobrang-Marsimik La-Tsogtsalu-Hot Springs Road" (PMTHR) or "Marsimik La Road" via Phobrang-Marsimik La-Tsogstsalu to Hot Springs, This Marsimik La Road via Lukung to Pamzal, constructed by India's Border Roads Organisation, traverses the pass. It is regarded as one of the highest motorable passes in the world. The other alternate route to Tsogtsalu is the 55 km long "Changchenmo-Tsogtsalu Road" (CTR) from confluence of Changchenmo & Shyok River to Tsogtsalu.

== Bibliography ==
- Gazetteer of Kashmir and Ladak, Calcutta: Superintendent of Government Printing, 1890
