= NOH =

NOH or NOH may refer to:

- Noh, a Japanese musical drama
- Noh, Burkina Faso, a town in Burkina Faso
- Nōhime, wife of Oda Nobunaga
- New Oriental Hotel, former name of Amangalla, a franchise hotel in Galle, Sri Lanka
- New Orleans Hornets, former name of the New Orleans Pelicans, an American basketball team
- Nitroxyl, a chemical compound
- A spelling variant of surname Roh (name)
- Noh, Ngari Prefecture, village in Tibet

== See also ==
- Nô (disambiguation)
- NOU (disambiguation)
