= Noo =

Noo or NOO may refer to:

== Places ==
- Nõo, a small borough in Tartu County, Estonia
  - Nõo Parish

== Fictional entities ==
- Noo, a fictional character from Creatures the World Forgot
- Noo-noo, a fictional character from Teletubbies

== Other uses ==
- National Obesity Observatory, publisher of British and Irish public health data
- Noo Saro-Wiwa, British/Nigerian writer and journalist
- nine one one

== See also ==
- New (disambiguation)
- No (disambiguation)
- Nu (disambiguation)
