= Khurnak Fort =

Ruined fort in eastern Ladakh

- མཁར་ནག (Standard Tibetan)
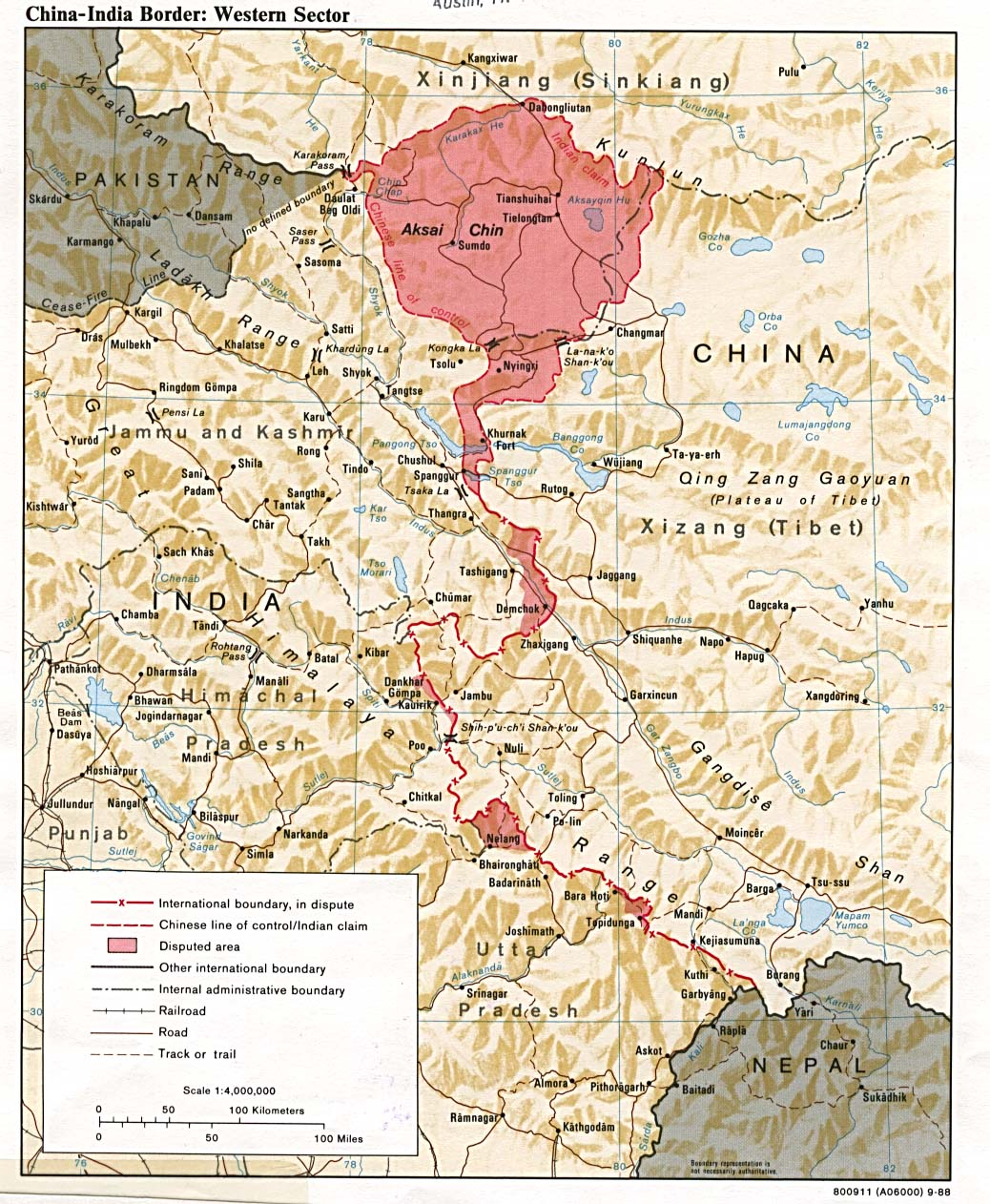
- 1988 CIA map showing Khurnak Fort in Aksai Chin

- Location within Ngari Location within Ladakh
- 33°45′54″N 78°59′20″E

Site notes
- Elevation: 4,257 meters

Khurnak Fort
- Traditional Chinese: 庫爾納克堡
- Simplified Chinese: 库尔纳克堡
Transcriptions
Standard Mandarin
- Hanyu Pinyin: Kùěrnàkè bǎo

Alternative Chinese name
- Traditional Chinese: 庫爾那克堡
- Simplified Chinese: 库尔那克堡
Transcriptions
Standard Mandarin
- Hanyu Pinyin: Kùěrnàkè bǎo

The Khurnak Fort (Tibetan: མཁར་ནག, Wylie: mkhar nag, THL: khar nak) is a ruined fort on the northern shore of Pangong Lake, which spans eastern Ladakh in India and Rutog County in the Tibet region of China. The area of the Khurnak Fort is disputed by India and China, and has been under Chinese administration since 1958.

Though the ruined fort itself is not of much significance, it serves as a landmark denoting the middle of Pangong Lake. The fort lies at the western edge of a large plain formed as the alluvial fan of a river called Changlung Lungpa, which falls into Pangong Lake from the north. The plain itself is called Ote Plain locally, but is now generally called the Khurnak Plain.

== Geography ==
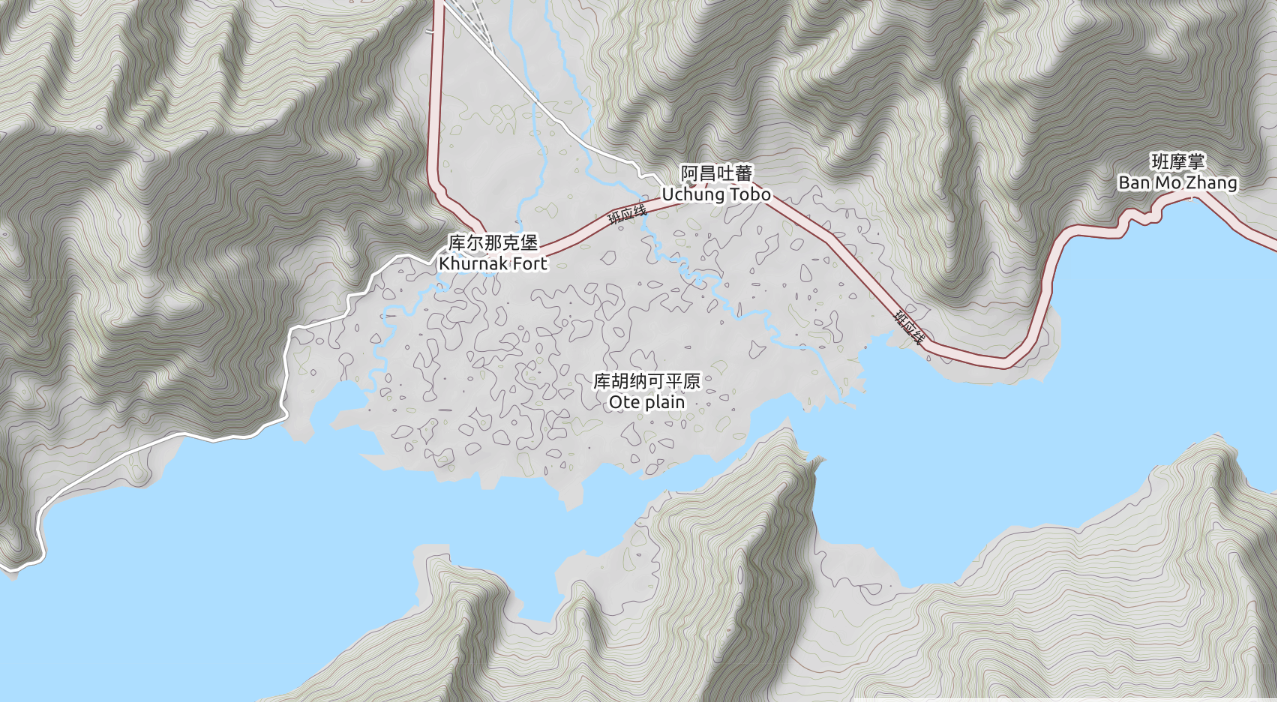
The Khurnak Plain and the narrow channel of Pangong

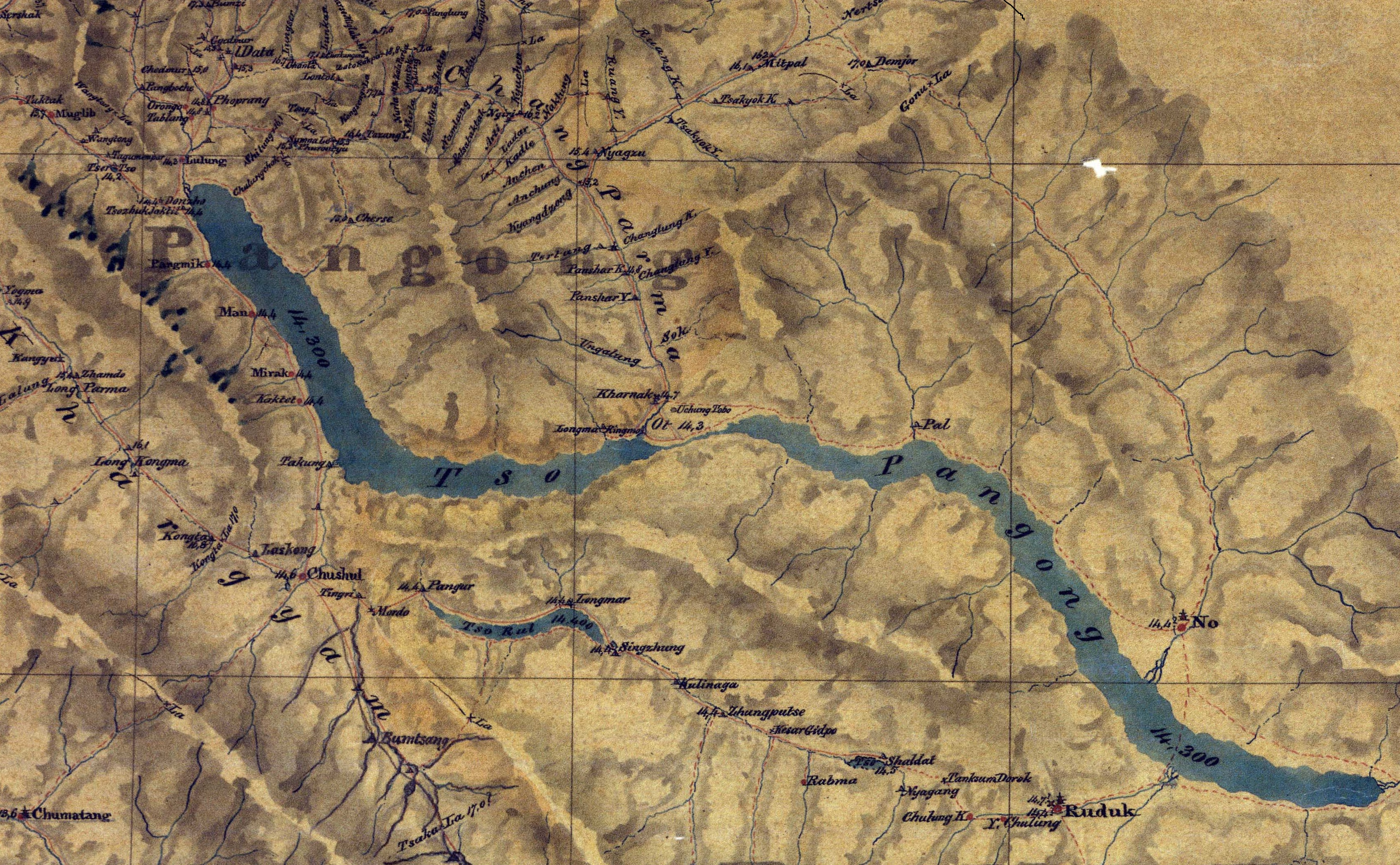
Map 1: Pangong Lake mapped by Henry Strachey (Note: Henry Strachey was an officer of the British Indian Army, who was noted for his independent exploration effort. In 1947, he was included as a commissioner in a Kashmir Boundary Commission headed by Alexander Cunningham.) in 1851. Ladakh–Rudok border shown by a faint orange colour wash. (Note: Henry Strachey explored the frontier of Ladakh as part of the British boundary commission for the princely state of Jammu and Kashmir in 1847. The extensive local knowledge gathered by him is published in Physical Geography of Western Tibet in 1951. His boundary commissioner's report is only available in Government archives.)

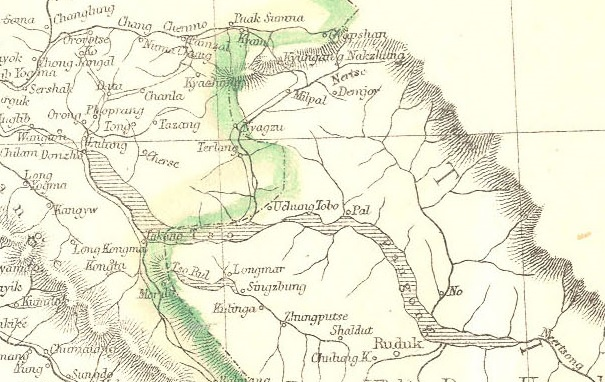
Map 2: An Edward Weller map of Ladakh in 1863 indicates the border marked by the Boundary Commission.

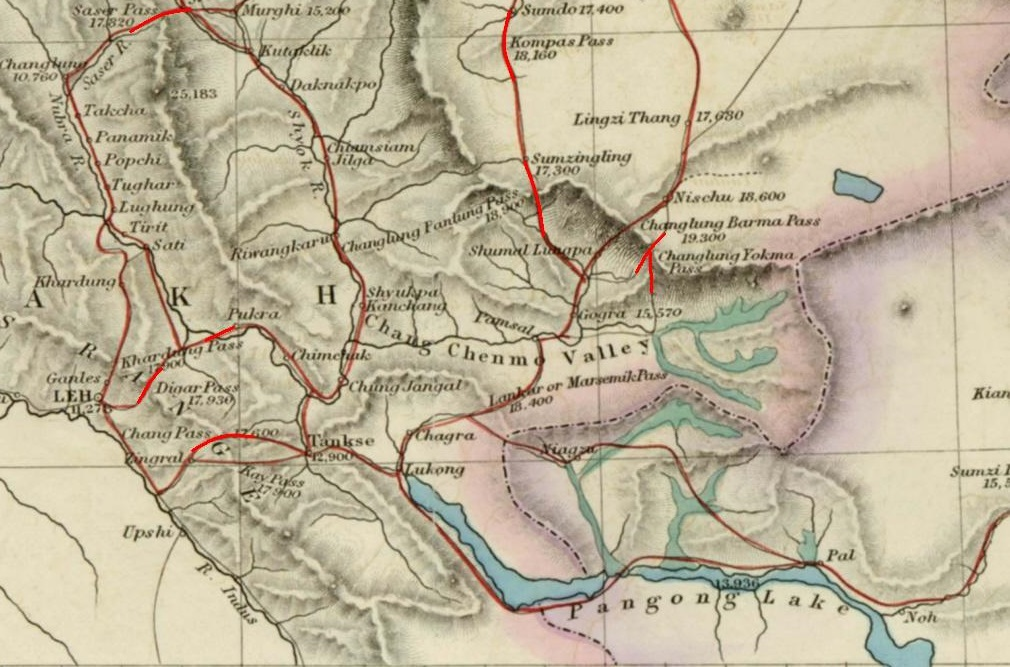
Map 3: Trade routes of Ladakh (Trotter, 1873)

The Khurnak Fort stands on a large plain called Ot or Ote at the centre of Pangong Lake on its northern bank. In recent times, the plain has come to be called the "Khurnak Plain", after the fort. The plain divides Pangong Lake into two halves: to the west is the Pangong Tso proper and to the east are a string of lakes called Nyak Tso, Tso Ngombo, or other names. (Note: Godwin-Austen says that the eastern lake is divided into fourth sections called Nyak Tso, Rum Tso and Tso Nyak. Hedin says that he never heard those names from the local people and its real name is Tso Ngombo.)

The Khurnak Plain is 8 miles long and 3 miles wide. It is, in fact, the mouth of a valley called "Changlung Lungpa" ( also called "Chang Parma", meaning "northern middle"). The river that flows through the valley (Note: The stream flowing from here is unlabelled in British maps, but it is occasionally referred to as the Nyagzu stream. Hedin has noted the similarity of "Nyagzu" to "Nyak Tso" (the "middle lake"). A better parsing of Nygazu might be "Nyak Chu", which would mean the middle stream or middle river.)—about 40 to 50 miles long—brings down waters from numerous glaciers lying between Pangong Lake and the Chang Chenmo Valley. The plain is formed by the alluvial deposits of the river encroaching into the bed of the lake. The growth of the plain over the millennia has reduced the lake in its vicinity to a narrow channel "like a large river" for about 2–3 miles, with a minimum breadth of 50 yards. The constrained flow of water from east to west makes the lower lake to the west (Pangong Tso) considerably more saline than the eastern lake (Tso Ngombo).

The top of the Changlung Lungpa valley is marked by a grazing ground called Dambu Guru. Here, the valley branches into two valleys, one going northwest to the Marsimik La pass and the other going northeast to the pastures of Nyagzu and Migpal. Migpal is connected via mountain passes to both the Chang Chenmo Valley in the northwest and the well-watered village of Noh in the southeast.

H. H. Godwin-Austen (Note: H. H. Godwin-Austen was a surveyor with the Great Trigonometric Survey, who was part of the Kashmir Survey team, 1855–1865. He did plane-tabling in this part of Ladakh. He also explored the Karakoram Range and named its peaks.) noted in 1867 that all of Khurnak Plain had considerable growth of grass and formed a winter grazing area for the Changpa nomads. The snow never stayed for long on the Khurnak Plain, even when the lake itself froze. The Changpa nomads of Noh (also called Üchang or Wujiang) and Rudok camped out at the plain during the winter. To protect the tents against the wind, walls of stone and earth were built, and the floors were dug 3 feet deep. Strachey also labelled the Khurnak Plain as "Uchang Tobo", which might indicate a connection with the village of Noh.

=== Access ===
The Khurnak Plain is accessible from both Ladakh and Rudok via multiple routes. Strachey noted two access routes from Ladakh, one via Kiu La and the other via the Chang Chenmo valley and Kyungang La. These were usable in the summer. A third route from the south, crossing the narrow channel of the lake, shown in later maps as a ford, would have been the easiest route to the Khurnak Plain (Map 3). The ability to ford the lake here was found erroneous in later British testimonies.

From the Tibetan side, a route along the northern shore of Pangong Lake was available. Sven Hedin witnessed it being used as a trade route by Ladakhi traders going to Rudok. The route was difficult to traverse in parts because of cliffs jutting into the lake. However, this was no impediment in winter when the lake froze. In addition, a longer route from Noh via Migpal was also available. (Map 3)

=== Khurnak Fort ===
Godwin-Austen mentioned the Khurnak Fort, whose ruins stood on a low rock (elevation: 4,257 m) on the northwestern side of the plain. Judging from its site, he believed that it belonged to Tibetans who presumably built it "years ago". But its proximity to Leh and the strength of its Thanadar (governor), he thought, placed it in Kashmiri territory. The Khurnak Plain was a "disputed ground", according to Godwin-Austen, which was claimed by the Ladakhis as well as the Tibetans of Rudok.

Evidently, the purpose of the fort was to guard against Ladakhis crossing to the Khurnak Plain from the south, crossing the narrow channel of the lake. Such activity was witnessed during the times of the British Raj as well. The Khurnak Plain, being a prized winter pasture ground, was the preserve of the shepherds from Noh, the only permanently inhabited place on the north shore of Pangong Lake. Ladakhis, who lived south of Pangong Lake, had their winter pastures in Skakjung, much further to the south.

== History ==
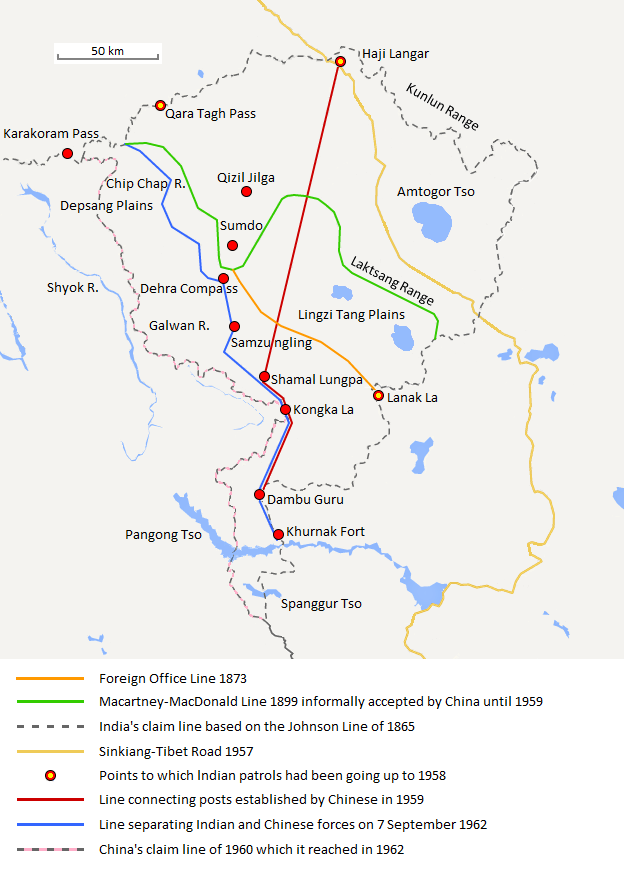
Map including Khurnak Fort

In 1863, British topographer Henry Haversham Godwin-Austen described Khurnak as a disputed plain claimed both by inhabitants of Panggong district and Tibetan authorities from Lhasa. He personally believed that it should belong to the latter due to the "old fort standing on a low rock on the north-western side of the plain" previously built by the Tibetans. Godwin-Austen remarked that the Kashmiri authorities in Leh had recently exerted their influence in the region such that Khurnak was effectively controlled by the Maharaja of Jammu and Kashmir.

According to Alastair Lamb, the majority of British maps published between 1918 and 1947 showed Khurnak as being in Tibet.

=== Sino-Indian border dispute ===
Prior to 1958, the boundary between India and China was considered to be at the Khurnak Fort and Indian forces visited it from time to time and had a post there. China wrested its control since around July 1958, according to most sources.

During the 1960 talks between the two governments on the boundary issue, India submitted official records, including the 1908 Settlement Report, which recorded the amount of revenue collected at Khurnak, as proof of jurisdiction over Khurnak. The Chinese claim line of 1956 did not include the Khurnak Fort, but the 1960 claim line included the Khurnak Fort.

In 1963, Khurnak Fort was described by the US National Photographic Interpretation Center as follows:

Location--33-44N 78-59E, 20 nm north-east of Chushul, on the north shore of PangongTso. Facilities--one large barracks-type building, 2 large storage-type buildings, and 9 smaller buildings; dry moat on three sides; six AW positions and several individual firing positions. Served by natural surface road; no vehicles observed.

As of 2019, a PLA border patrol company of the Western Theater Command was stationed nearby.

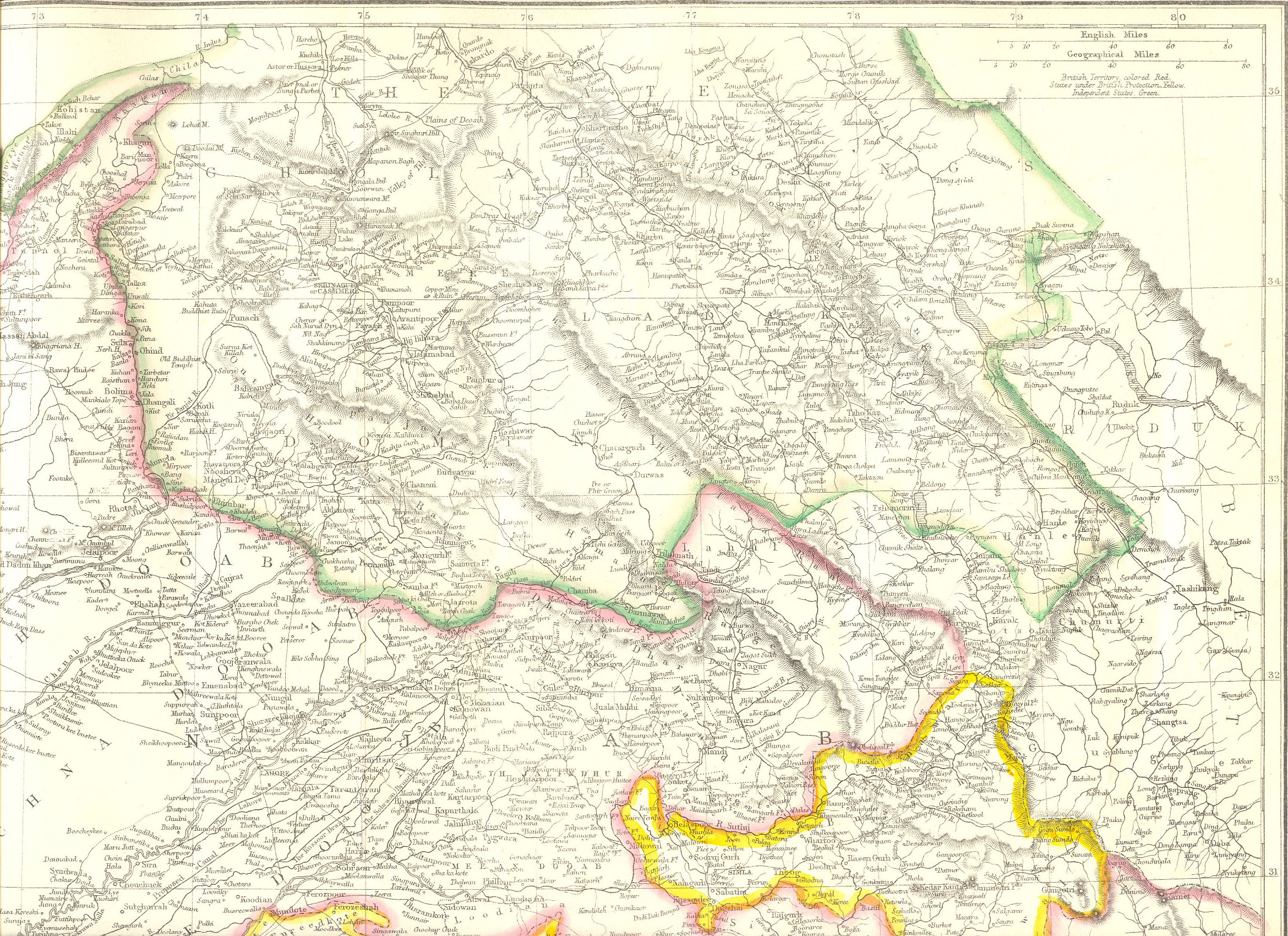
Edward Weller map of Ladakh and Garhwal, 1863

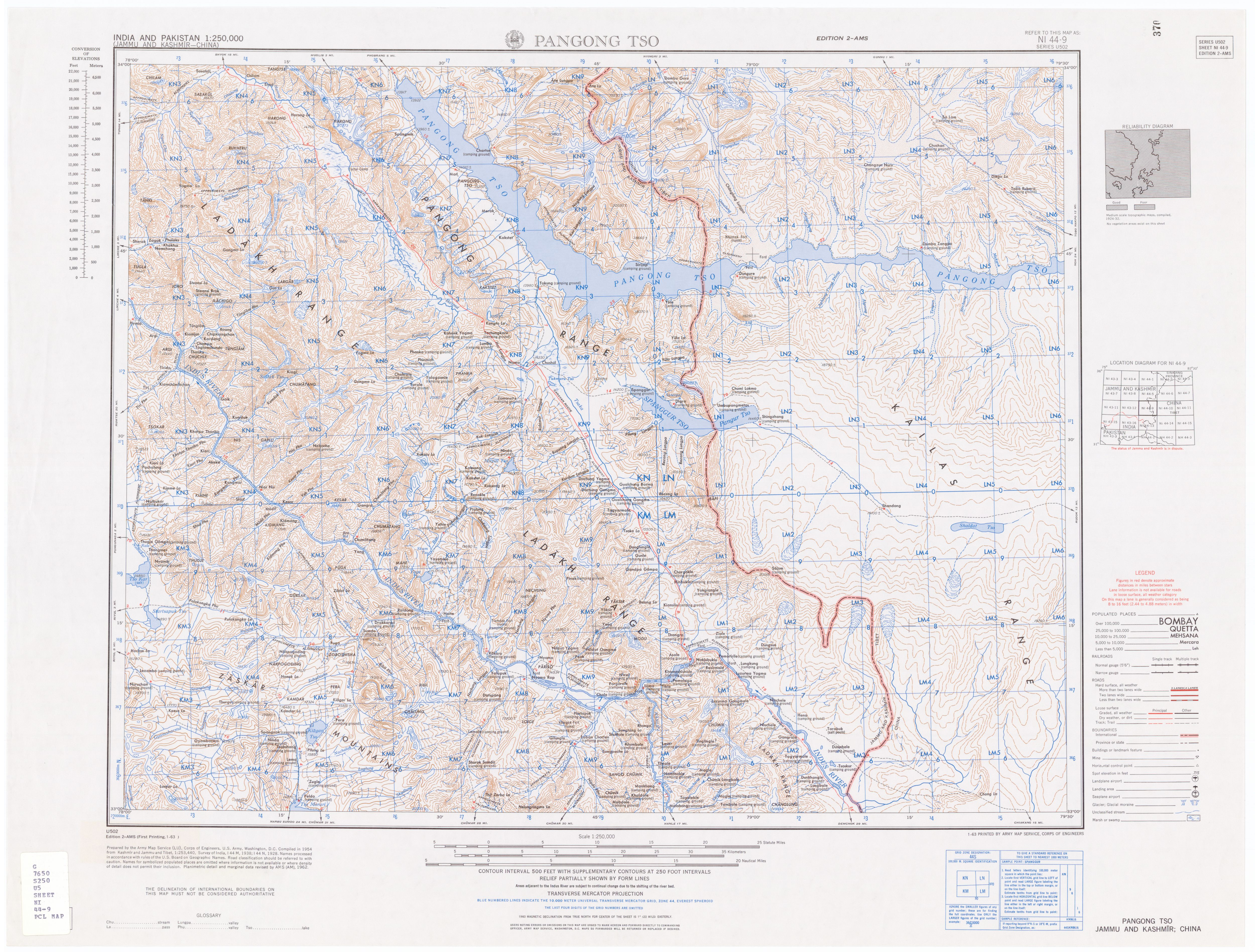
Map including Khurnak Fort (ruins) (AMS, 1954)(AMS, 1954) (Note: From map: "THE DELINEATION OF INTERNATIONAL BOUNDARIES ON THIS MAP MUST NOT BE CONSIDERED AUTHORITATIVE")

Map including Khurnak Fort (DMA, 1982)

== See also ==
- List of locations in Aksai Chin

== Bibliography ==
- Gazetteer of Kashmir and Ladak, Calcutta: Superintendent of Government Printing, 1890 – via archive.org
- Godwin-Austen, H. H. (1867). "Notes on the Pangong Lake District of Ladakh, from a Journal Made during a Survey in 1863". Journal of the Royal Geographical Society of London. 37: 343–363. doi:10.2307/1798534. JSTOR 1798534.
- Hedin, Sven (1907), Scientific Results of a Journey in Central Asia, 1899–1902, Vol. IV: Central and West Tibet, Stockholm: Lithographic Institute of the General Staff of the Swedish Army – via archive.org
- Kaul, Hriday Nath (2003). India China Boundary in Kashmir. Gyan Publishing House. ISBN 978-81-212-0826-0.
- Lamb, Alastair (1965). "Treaties, Maps and the Western Sector of the Sino-Indian Boundary Dispute" (PDF). The Australian Year Book of International Law. 1 (1): 37–52. doi:10.1163/26660229-001-01-900000005. Archived from the original (PDF) on 2020-06-08.
- Strachey, Henry (1854), Physical Geography of Western Tibet, London: William Clows and Sons – via archive.org
- Ward, A. E. (1896), The Tourist's and Sportsman's guide to Kashmir and Ladak, Thaker, Spink & Co – via archive.org
