= Noh, Tibet =

Wujiang Üchang Noh
- Village
- Location within Tibet
- Coordinates: 33°37′06″N 79°48′34″E
- Country: China
- Region: Tibet
- Prefecture: Ngari
- County: Rutog

Area
  - Total: 4,500 km^{2} (1,700 sq mi)
- Elevation: 4,322 m (14,180 ft)

Population (2009)
  - Total: 818

Wujang
- Chinese: 乌江村
- Hanyu Pinyin: Wūjiāng cūn
- Literal meaning: "Wujang Village"
Transcriptions
Standard Mandarin
- Hanyu Pinyin: Wūjiāng cūn

Noh, also called Üchang or Wujang (Tibetan: དབུས་བྱང, Wylie: dbus byang, THL: wü jang) is a village in the Rutog County, Ngari Prefecture of the Tibet region of China. It is located on the northern bank of the eastern Pangong Lake (Tso Ngombo), watered by the Doma River (Tsanger-schar). The village is now part of the Domar Township.

Noh is described as a temple town by European travellers. It is the only permanently inhabited place on the northern bank of the Pangong Lake. It is frequently referred to in the British records of the Pangong Lake, but the British (and "foreigners" in general) were not generally allowed to visit it.

== Geography ==
The state highway S520 called Banying Highway connects Noh with the Khurnak Plain and the Kongka Pass in the Chang Chenmo Valley. The latter is on the Line of Actual Control with India. S520 also connects to the National Highway G219 (Aksai Chin road) in the east.

== Current status ==
As of 2009, there are 818 people living in the village. There is also an army base of a border defence company, which is said to have the hard task of defending a long border. According to the Xizang Government, the villagers and the army get along well with each other.

== Historical maps ==
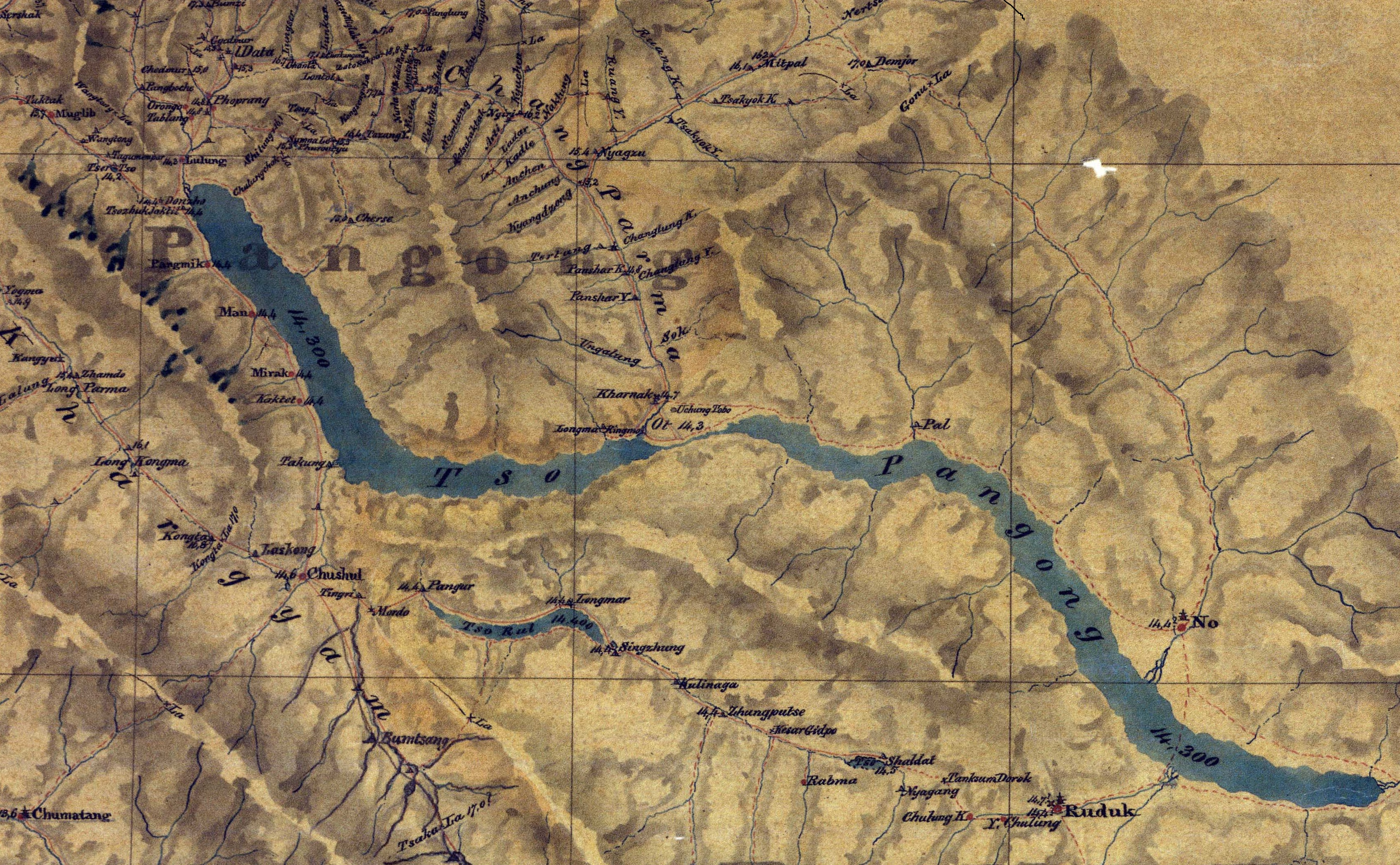
The Pangong Lake area in a map of Ngari Khorsum by Henry Strachey, 1851

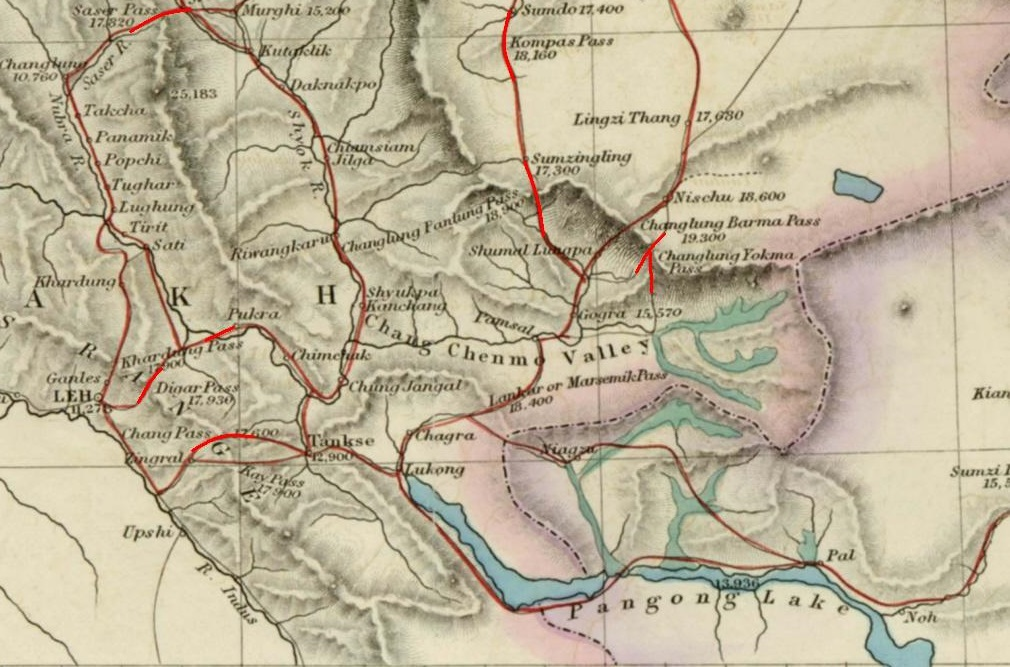
Noh along a trade route of Ladakh (1873)
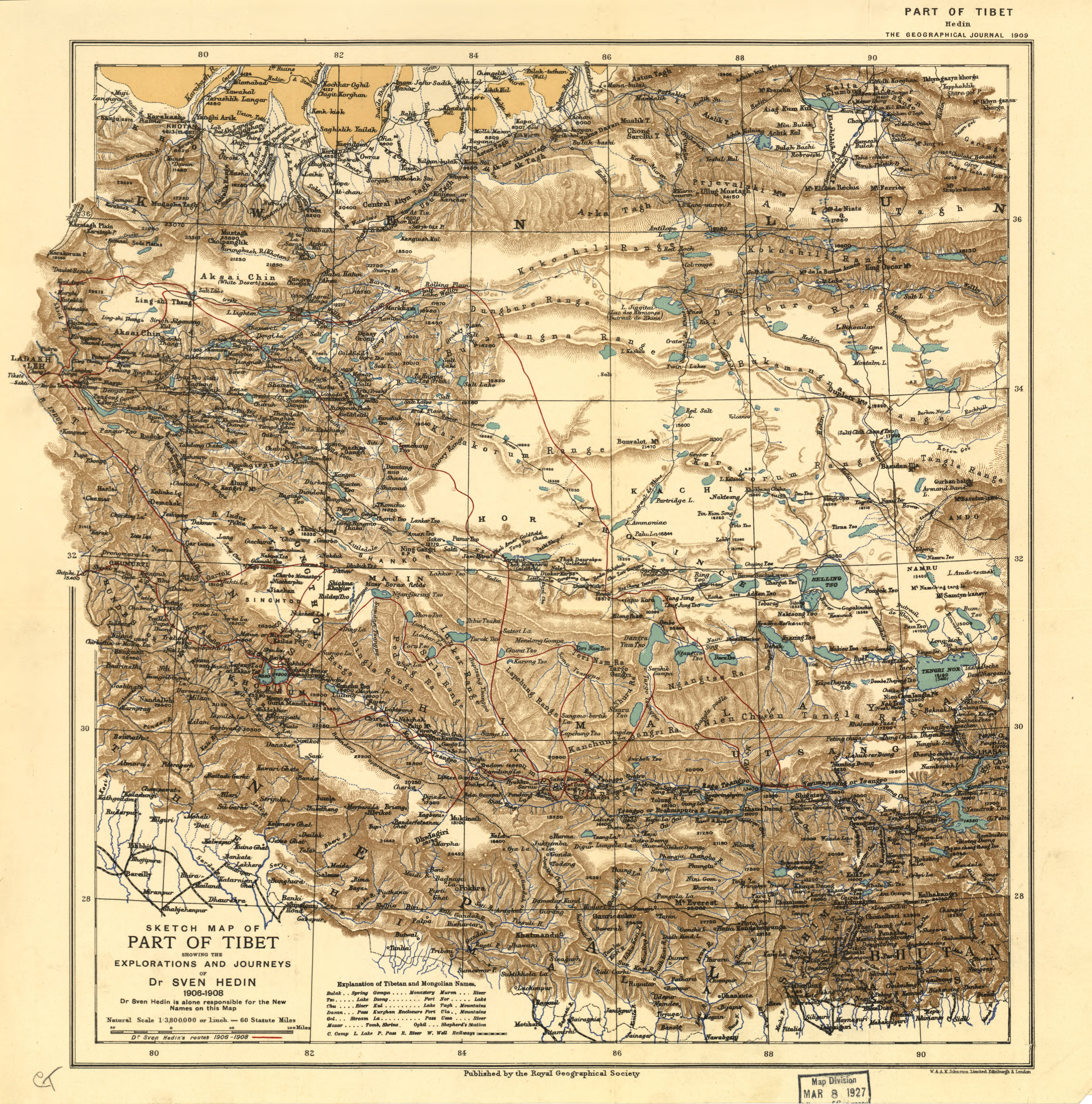
Map of the expeditions of Sven Hedin (1906-8) including Noh (RGS, early 20th century)

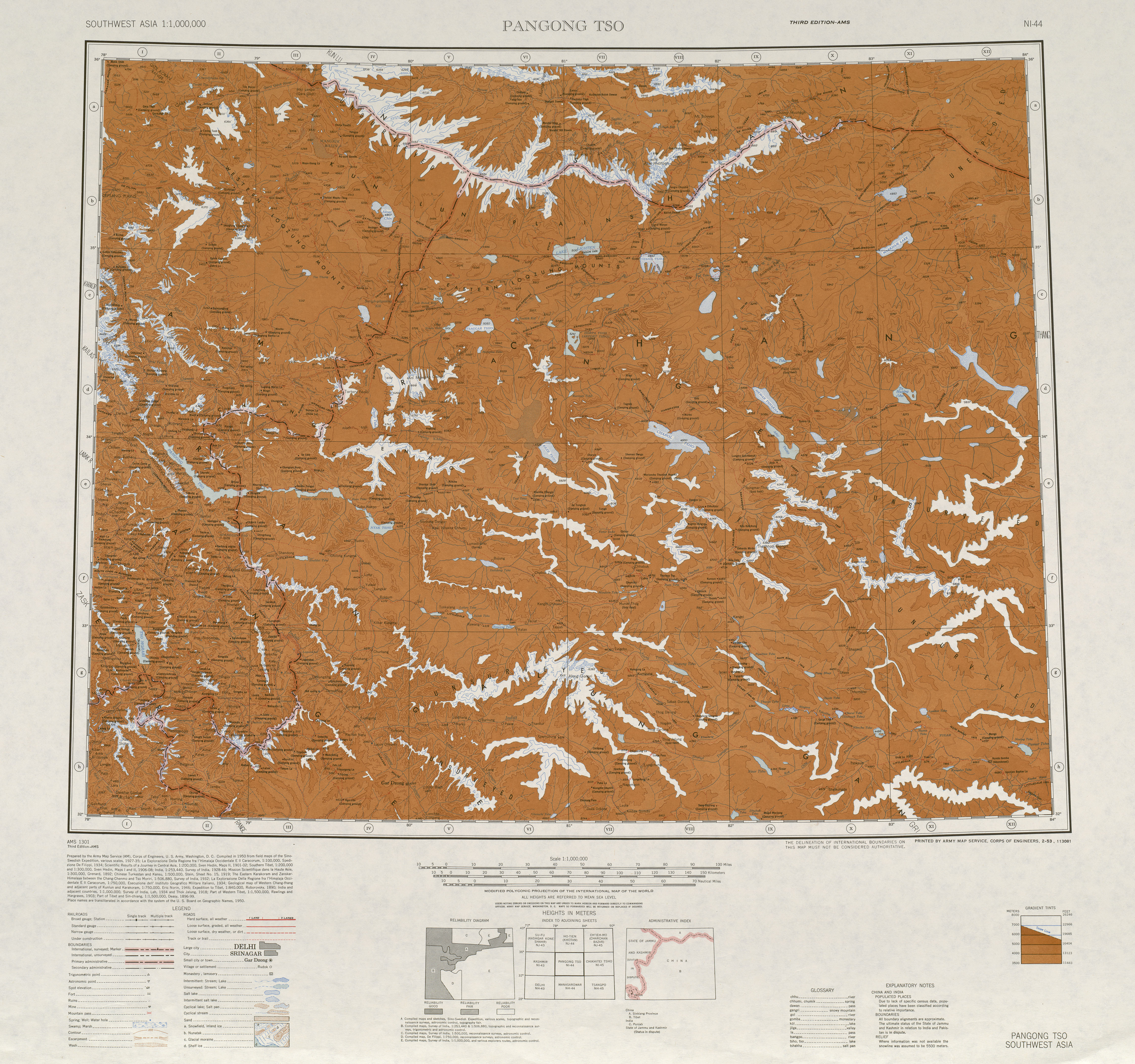
Map including Noh (AMS, 1950) (Note: From map: "THE DELINEATION OF INTERNATIONAL BOUNDARIES ON THIS MAP MUST NOT BE CONSIDERED AUTHORITATIVE.")

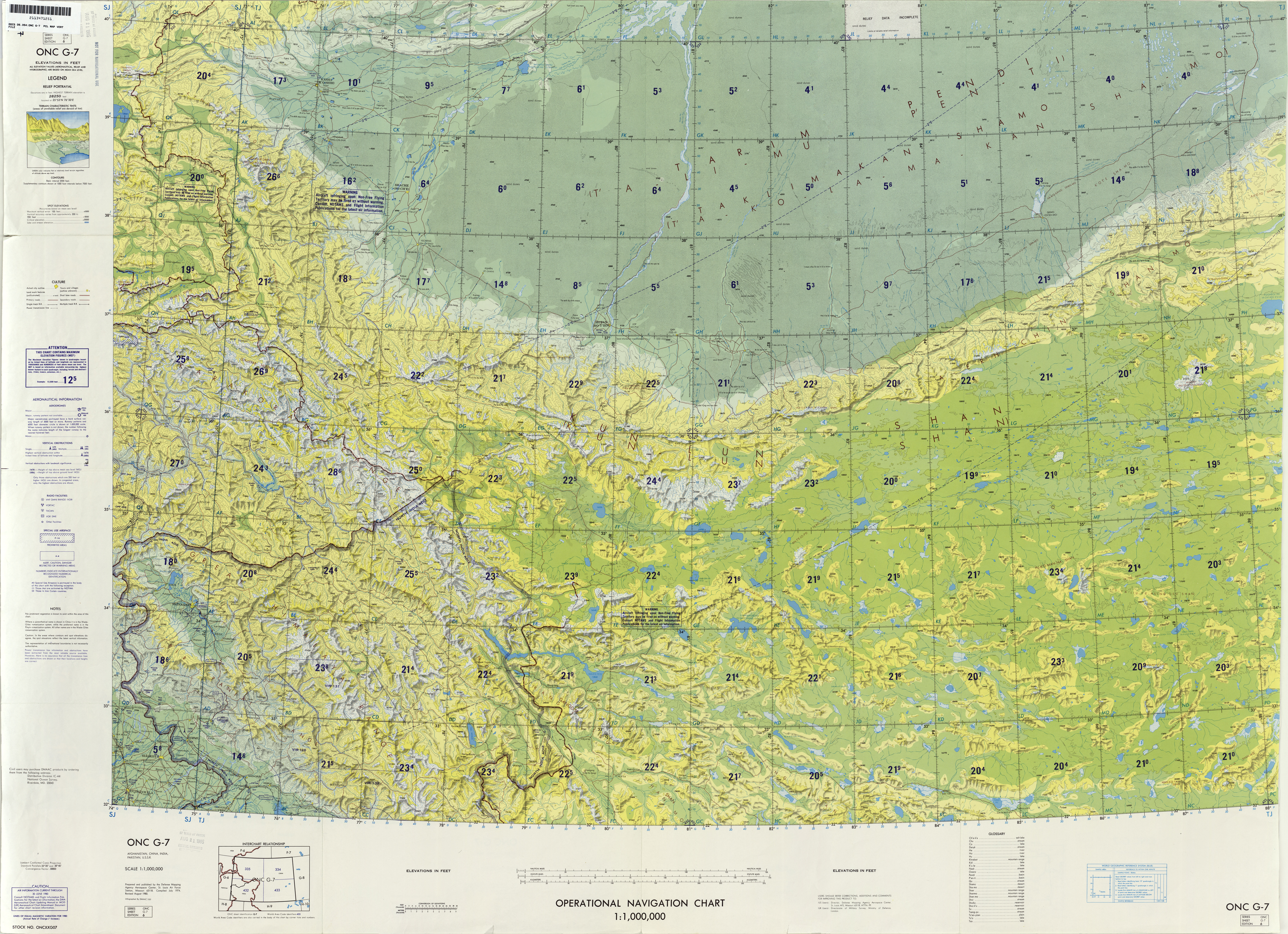
Map showing Shan-ho (DMA, 1980)

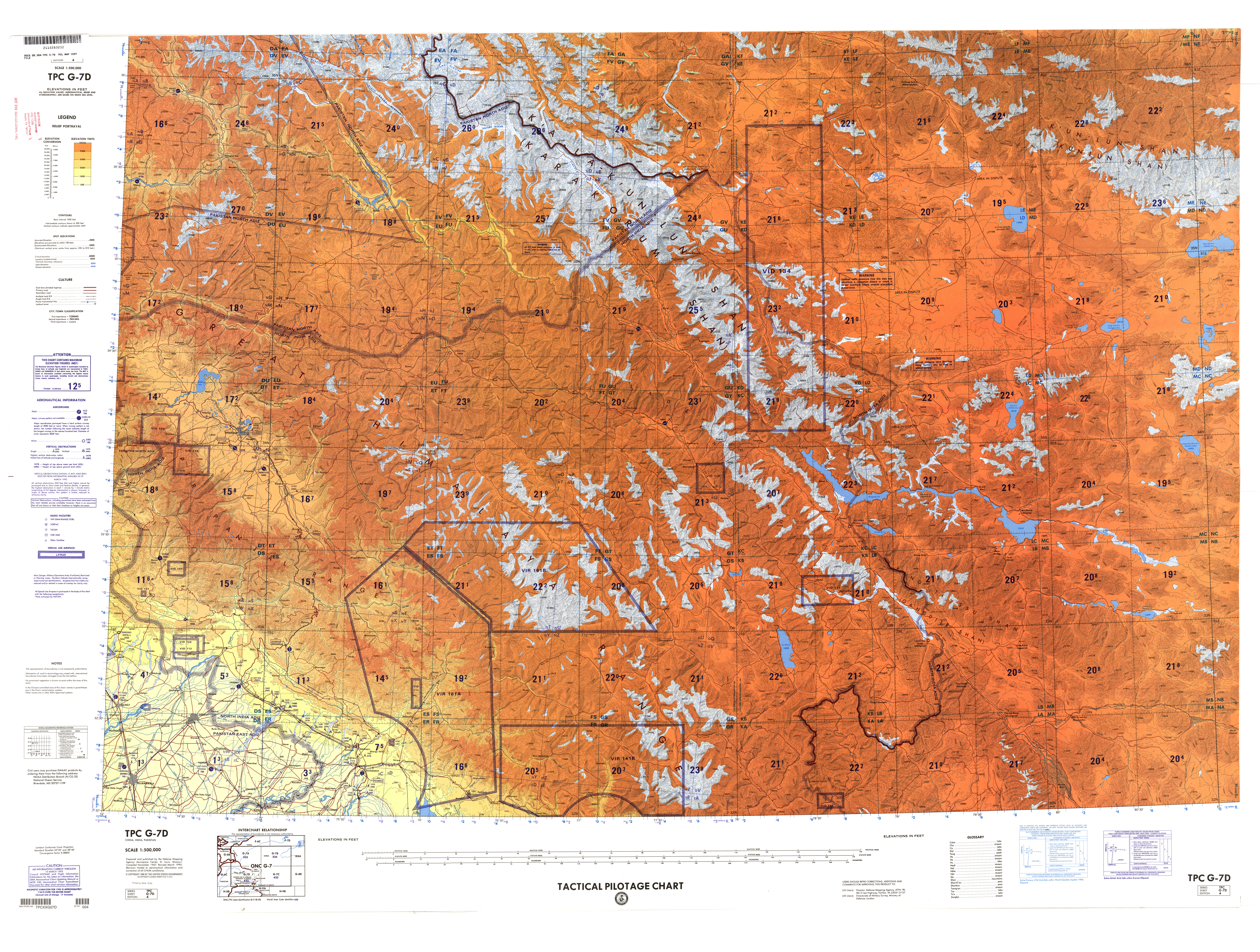
Map showing Wu-chiang (Wüjang) (DMA, 1995)

== Bibliography ==
- Gazetteer of Kashmir and Ladak, Calcutta: Superintendent of Government Printing, 1890
- Godwin-Austen, H. H. (1867). "Notes on the Pangong Lake District of Ladakh, from a Journal Made during a Survey in 1863". Journal of the Royal Geographical Society of London. 37: 343–363. doi:10.2307/1798534. JSTOR 1798534.
- Hedin, Sven (1907), Scientific Results of a Journey in Central Asia, 1899–1902, Vol. IV: Central and West Tibet, Stockholm: Lithographic Institute of the General Staff of the Swedish Army – via archive.org
- Strachey, Henry (1854), Physical Geography of Western Tibet, London: William Clows and Sons – via archive.org
