= No Creek (Missouri) =

Stream in the American state of Missouri

Coordinates: 39°56′49″N 93°33′36″W

No Creek is a stream in Livingston and Grundy counties of northern Missouri in the United States. It is a tributary of the Thompson River.

The origin of the name No Creek is obscure.

== See also ==
- List of rivers of Missouri
