= Tsogtsalu =

Indian border checkpost in Ladakh, India

Tsogstalu
- Pasture and border outpost
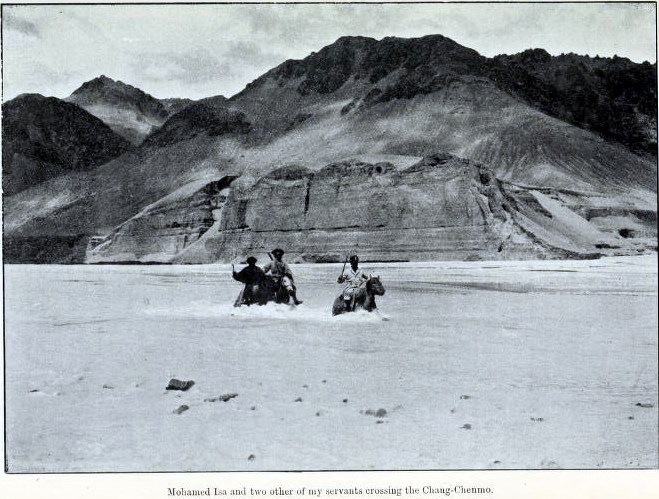
- Cheng Chenmo River near Tsogtsalu

- Location within Ladakh
- Coordinates: 34°16′04″N 78°44′32″E
- Country: India
- Union territory: Ladakh
- District: Leh
- Elevation: 4,500 m (14,760 ft)

Tsogtsalu (Note: Alternative spellings: Tsogatsalu and Tsogstsalu.) or Tsolu is a pasture, traditional campsite, and Indian Military's base in the Ladakh union territory of India, in the Chang Chenmo Valley close to India's LAC border with Tibet. It is located at the confluence of the Rimdi Chu river that flows north from Marsemik La and the west-flowing Chang Chenmo River.

== History ==
During the British Raj, this was a halting spot for travellers to Central Asia via the 'Chang Chenmo route', passing through Aksai Chin.

== Military post ==
After Indian independence, a border outpost was established here by a border police party headed by Captain Karam Singh. It continues to serve as a base for India's border forces.

A Formation Ammunition Storage Facility (FASF) is being established over an area of 24.2 ha (242,000 m^{2}) at Tsogtsalu within the Changthang Wildlife Sanctuary for the Indian Army.

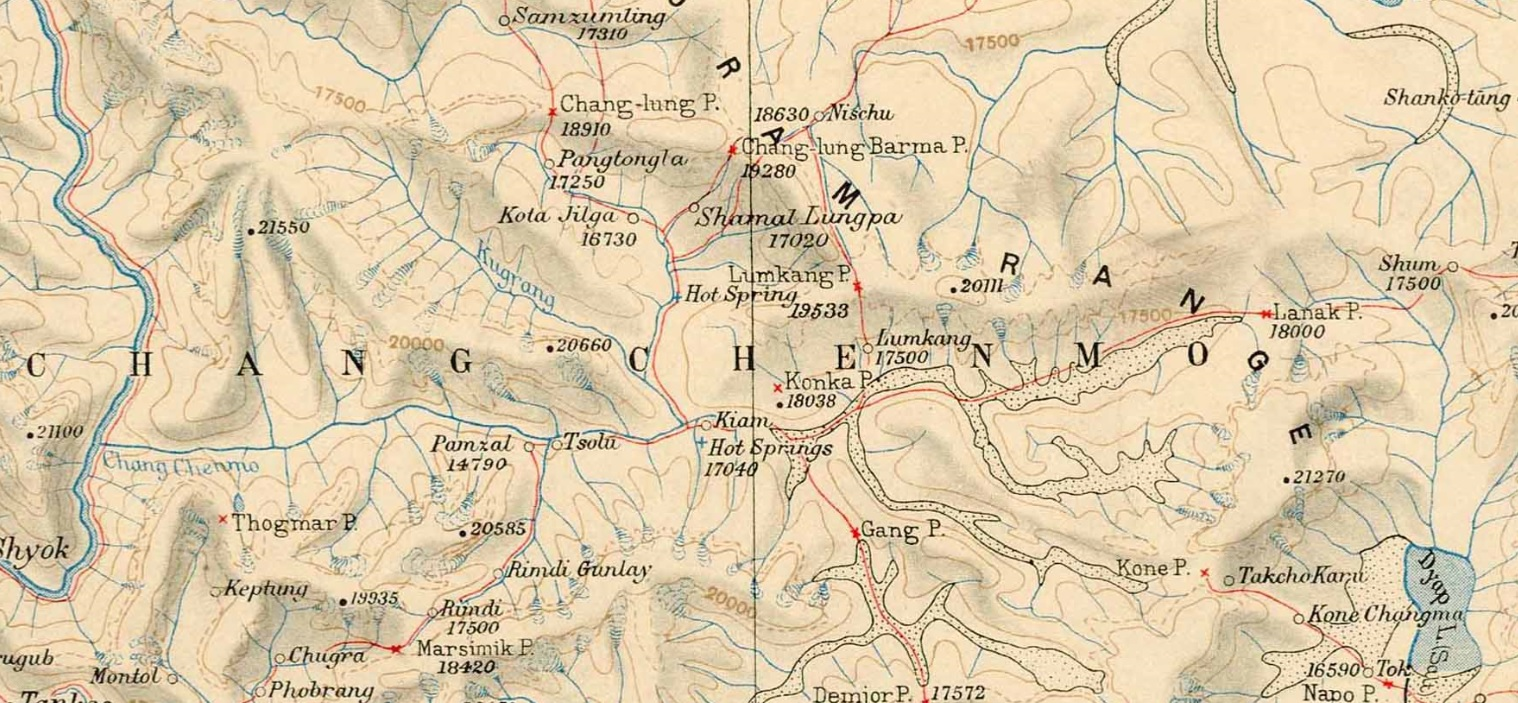
Map 1: Changchenmo Valley and its branch valleys (Survey of India, 1916)

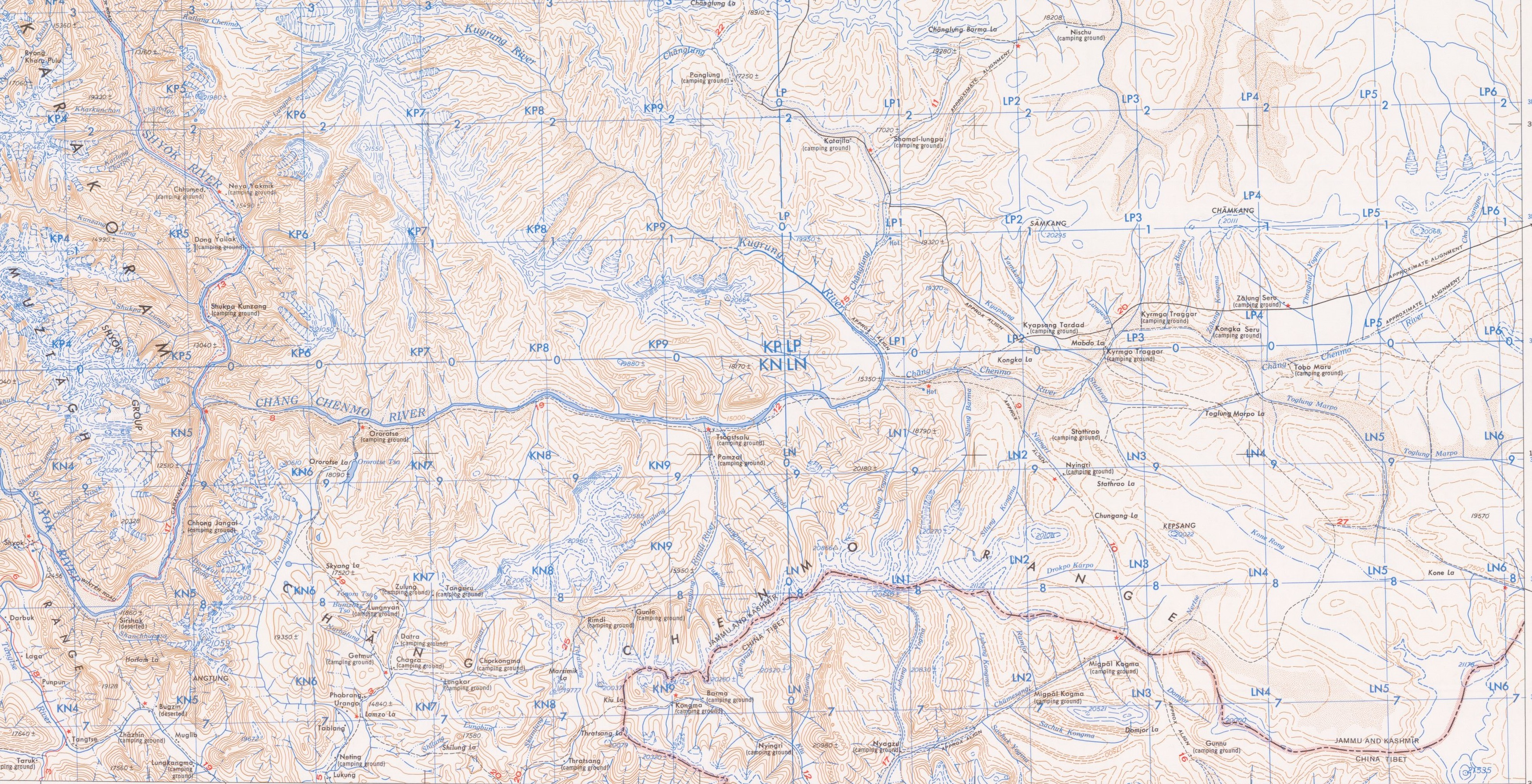
Map 2: Changchenmo Valley and its branch valleys (US AMS, 1955)

== Transport ==
Within India, it is reachable by the "Marsimik La Road" from Phobrang via Marsimik La. An additional route the 55 km long from the west along the Changchenmo valley is under construction.

== See also ==
- Kongka Pass
- Geography of Ladakh
- Tourism in Ladakh
- India-China Border Roads

== Bibliography ==
- Gazetteer of Kashmir and Ladak, Calcutta: Superintendent of Government Printing, 1890
- India, Ministry of External Affairs, ed. (1962), Report of the Officials of the Governments of India and the People's Republic of China on the Boundary Question, Government of India Press
- Johri, Sitaram (1969), Chinese Invasion of Ladakh, Himalaya Publications
- Hoffmann, Steven A. (1990), India and the China Crisis, University of California Press, ISBN 978-0-520-06537-6
- Maxwell, Neville (1970), India's China War, Pantheon Books, ISBN 978-0-394-47051-1 – via archive.org
- Mullik, B. N. (1971), My Years with Nehru: The Chinese Betrayal, Allied Publishers – via archive.org
- Sandhu, P. J. S.; Shankar, Vinay; Dwivedi, G. G. (2015), 1962: A View from the Other Side of the Hill, Vij Books India Pvt Ltd, ISBN 978-93-84464-37-0
