= NOU =

NOU or Nou may refer to:

== Education ==
- Nalanda Open University, Patna, Bihar, India
- National Open University, Taiwan
- North Orissa University, Baripada, Orissa, India

== People ==
- Enn Nõu (born 1933), Estonian writer
- Loa Nou (born 1987), Papua New Guinean cricketer

== Places ==
=== Japan ===
- Nō, Niigata, a dissolved town
  - Nō Station, Itoigawa

=== Romania ===
- Nou, Sibiu, Roșia, Sibiu
- Nou Român, Arpașu de Jos, Sibiu
- Nou Săsesc, Laslea, Sibiu

=== Elsewhere ===
- Nou, Iran
- Camp Nou, a stadium in Barcelona, Spain
- La Tontouta International Airport, New Caledonia (IATA: NOU)

== Other uses ==
- Noh, a Japanese form of musical drama
- Norwegian Official Report (Norwegian: Norges offentlige utredninger)
- Ewage language, spoken on New Guinea (ISO 639:nou)

== See also ==
- NOH (disambiguation)
- Nô (disambiguation)
