= No Creek (Kentucky) =

Stream in Ohio County, Kentucky, U.S.

Coordinates: 37.4856034°N 87.0008283°W

No Creek is a stream in Ohio County, Kentucky, in the United States.

No Creek was named after a surveyor was overheard saying "Why, that's no creek at all".

== See also ==
- List of rivers of Kentucky
