= Nô =

Nô may refer to:

- Noh, a form of Japanese musical drama
- Nô (film), a 1998 film which uses Noh theatre as a dramatic device

== See also ==
- No (disambiguation)
