= Henry Strachey (explorer) =

British explorer

Sir Henry Strachey
- Born: 1816
- Died: 1912 (aged 95–96)
- Known for: Extensive explorations and surveys in Western Tibet
- Honours: Patron's Medal

Lieutenant-Colonel Sir Henry Strachey (1816–1912) was a British officer of the Bengal Army. Despite a longstanding prohibition by the Tibetan authorities on the entry of Europeans into Tibet, Strachey surveyed parts of western Tibet during the late 1840s.

He was the second son of Edward Strachey, second son of Sir Henry Strachey, 1st Baronet. His brothers included Sir Richard Strachey, Sir John Strachey and Sir Edward Strachey, 3rd Baronet.

== Tibetan surveys ==
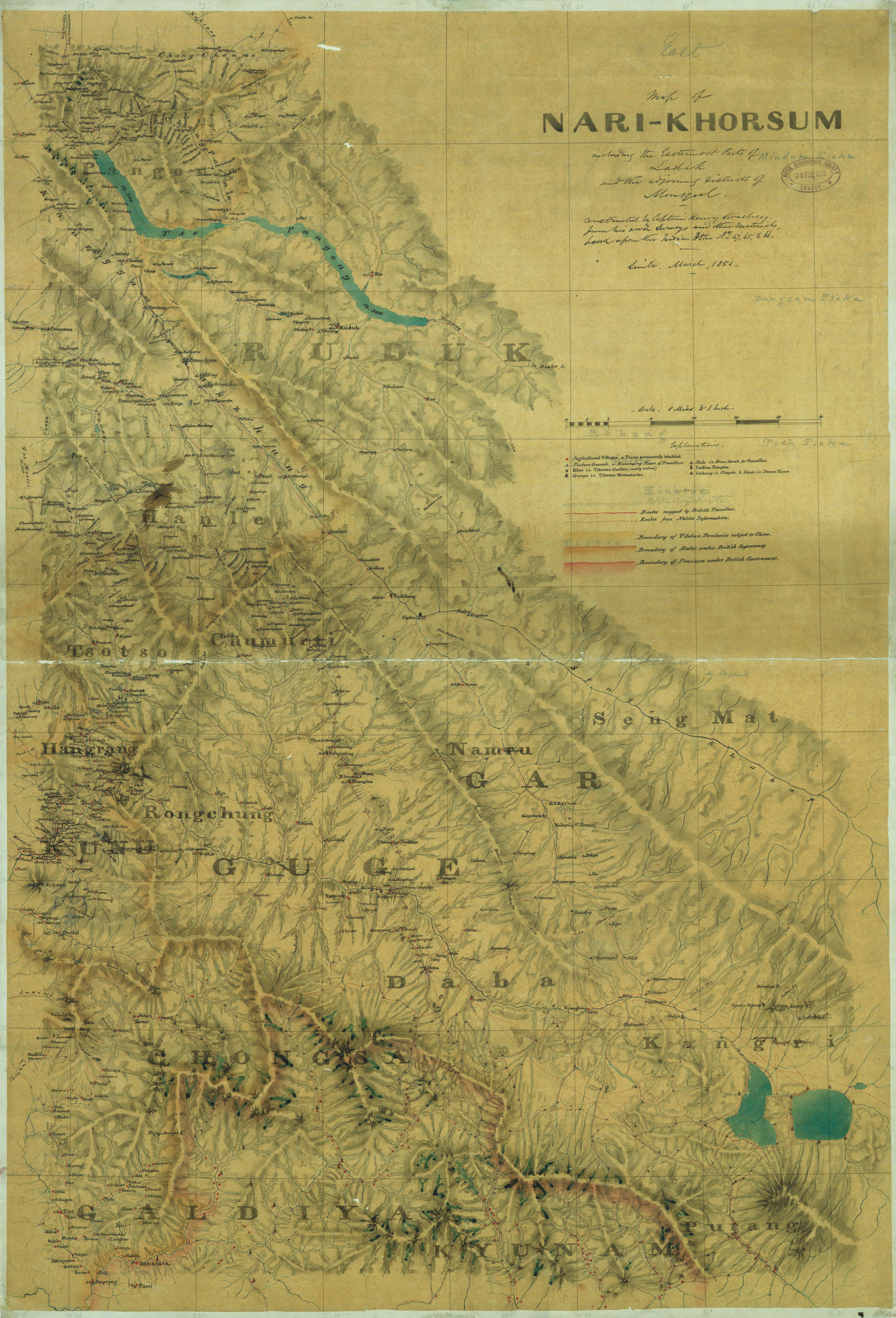
One of Strachey's maps (1851)

In 1846, while a lieutenant of the 66th Regiment of Bengal Native Infantry, Strachey explored the Tibetan regions surrounding Lakes Manasarovar and Rakshastal. He found a channel between the lakes, suggesting that Manasarovar, and not Rakshastal, was the source of the Sutlej River. Strachey's brother Richard, with J. E. Winterbottom, continued the exploration of the lakes in 1848.

In 1847 Strachey was appointed to a boundary commission of Jammu and Kashmir led by Alexander Cunningham. The third member was Thomas Thomson. The commission was set up to fix the boundary between Tibet and Ladakh. Raja Gulab Singh's forces had previously annexed Ladakh and invaded Tibet in 1841. The British deemed it important to formalise the boundary so as to prevent any future conflicts. However, the Tibetan authorities did not participate. Neither was the commission given permission to enter Tibet. The commission based itself at Leh, Ladakh. It eventually drafted a description of the boundary and retired. In 1848 Strachey was the first European to find the Siachen Glacier, and ascended it for 2 miles.

In 1849, Henry Strachey and his brother Richard Strachey briefly entered Tibet by following the Niti Pass out of Garhwal. Their route included Tholing Monastery and Hanle.

Strachey's Tibetan surveys won him the Royal Geographical Society's Patron's Medal in 1852.

== Family ==
On 6 September 1859, by this time a captain of the 66th Goorkha Regiment of Bengal Native Infantry, he married Joanna Catherine, daughter of Rudolphe Cloete, of Newlands, Cape Town, South Africa. The wedding was in Claremont, Cape Town. Their only child was Julia Charlotte, who in 1884 married barrister William Chance (2 July 1853 – 9 April 1935), son of James Timmins Chance of the glassmaking company Chance Brothers. Julia was an amateur sculptor, and a supporter of the Arts and Crafts movement. The couple's house, Orchards in Surrey, was designed by architect Edwin Lutyens. In 1902, Sir William Chance succeeded his father to the Chance baronetcy. Julia, Lady Chance died in 1949.

== Writings ==
- "Narration of a Journey to Cho Lagan, (Rakas Tal), Cho Mapan (Manasarowar), and the valley of Pruang in Gnari, Hundes, in September and October 1846", The Journal of the Asiatic Society of Bengal, Volume 17, 1848, pp. 98–120, 127–182, 327–351
- "Physical Geography of Western Tibet", Journal of the Royal Geographical Society 23, 1853.
