= Karsha, Ladakh =

Karsha in Ladakh in India

Karsha
- Village
- Location of Karsha in Ladakh, India Karsha (India)
- Coordinates: 33.5358°N 76.8286°E
- Country: India
- Union territory: Ladakh
- District: Zanskar
- Tehsil: Padum

Population (2011)
  - Total: 964
- Time zone: UTC+05:30 (IST)

Karsha (also spelled Karcha or karshah) is a Village in the Zanskar district of the Union territory of Ladakh, India.

== Demographics ==
According to the 2011 Census of India, the village named Karsha recorded a population of 964 spread across roughly 189 households.

Demographics of Karsha (2011 Census)
Parameter	Total	Male	Female
Population	964	496	468
Children (0–6 years)	135	67	68
Literacy Rate	66.83%	84.38%	48%
Scheduled Tribes	961	493	468

The predominant population belongs to the Zanskari ethnic group, classified as Scheduled Tribes.

== Karsha Monastery ==
Karsha Monastery (Karsha Gompa) dominates the town's landscape.

== See also ==
- Karsha Monastery
- Padum
- Zanskar district
