= Warrior Films =

Film Production Company from California

Warrior Films is a 501(c)(3) non-profit film production company headquartered in Oakland, California. Founded by Oscar and Emmy nominated producer/director Frederick Marx (Hoop Dreams) in 2003, the organization produces documentary films about people overcoming social-economic barriers to create social change. Warrior Films also runs a documentary filmmaking course in partnership with colleges and universities.

== Films ==
=== Boys to Men? (2004) ===
In Newark, New Jersey, 32 boys from across different races, classes, and cultures meet to discuss violence, anger, girls, homophobia, masculinity, and coming manhood. This mini-series also follows the journey of three 15-year old boys over the course of nine months as they deal with issues of masculinity and coming manhood.

=== Journey From Zanskar (2010) ===
Journey From Zanskar tells the emotional story of 17 small children who leave home and family, possibly forever, in order to save their dying Tibetan culture. Parting from one of the most remote and desolate places on Earth – Zanskar, in northwest India – the expedition must travel on foot over 16,000 foot Shinkula Pass in the Himalayas. Two monks, serving as guides, walked this same path 30 years ago when they were children. Narrated by Richard Gere, featuring the Dalai Lama, the film tells the story of their incredible journey.

=== Rites of Passage (In Production) ===
An estimated $500 billion is spent yearly on teen dysfunctions: drug and alcohol abuse, teen pregnancy and STDs, school dropouts and expulsions, gang and property crimes, traffic accidents, ADD, ADHD, depression and violence. The film will show why healthy rites of passage (initiation, mentoring) are the solutions to teenage dysfunctions.

Rites of Passage will show how historically all major cultures and religions have had their own rites of passage. The film will also show the price society pays for not initiating teens and how communities are answering the call by co-creating their own functional rites of passage today. Rites of Passage will show real families who have been struck by the horrors and crimes of youth and how they are repairing themselves and their neighborhoods. Finally, the film will not only show teens who have been transformed by rites of passage, but also how their metamorphosis has revolutionized their relations with family, friends, teachers, and bosses, thereby creating positive changes rippling across homes, schools, neighborhoods, workplaces, cities and farms across the planet.

A short film version of Rites of Passage was released in March 2015. It was screened at the Film For (A Better) Future Film Festival in Atlanta, Georgia in May 2016.

=== Veterans Journey Home (In Production) ===
Veterans Journey Home will tell the story of the 1.7 million returning U.S. veterans and what it takes for them to successfully transition back into civilian life. The film will examine how these veterans can be emotionally healed from the scars of war.

== Filmography ==
- Veterans Journey Home (in production)
- Rites of Passage (in production)
- Rites of Passage (short film) (2015)
- Journey From Zanskar (2010)
- Boys To Men? (documentary mini-series) (2004)
