= Sengge-La =

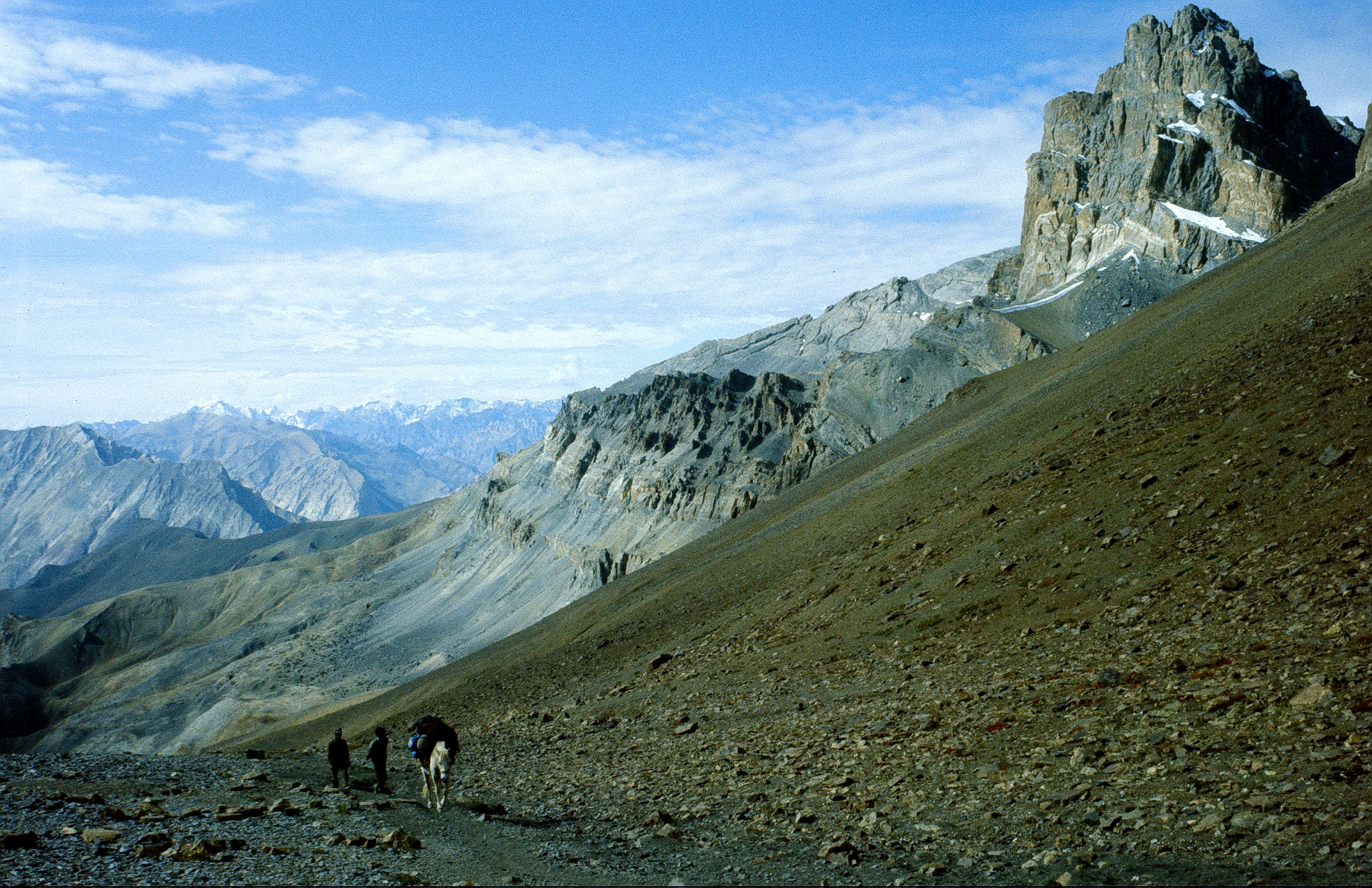
Sengge-La

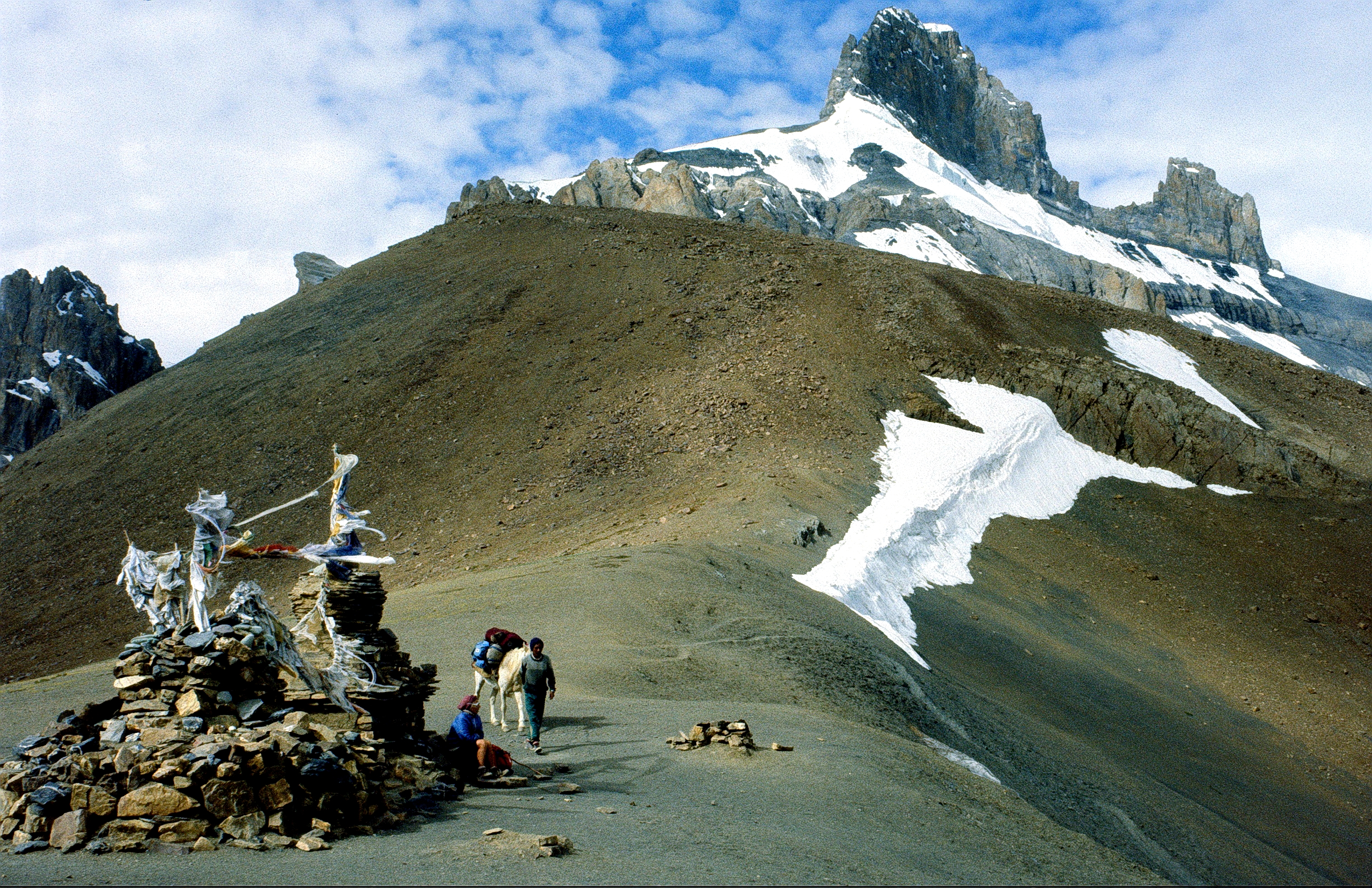

The Sengge-La is a mountain of around 4700 metres in the Zanskar region in the union territory of Ladakh in northern India.
