= Zangla Monastery =

Former palace in Zanskar, India

Zangla Fort
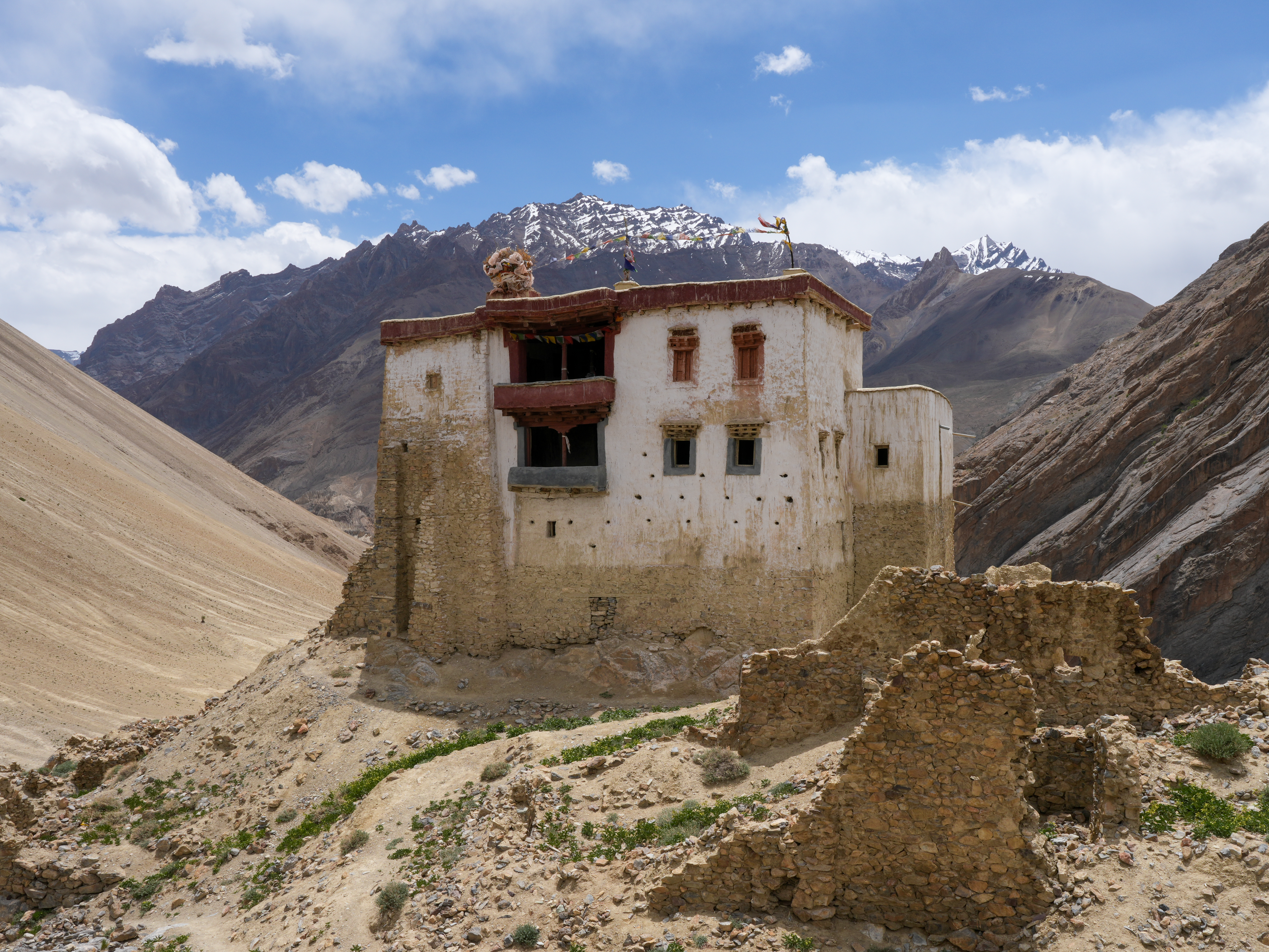
- Zangla Monastery

- Location within India Zangla Monastery (India)

Religion
- Affiliation: Tibetan Buddhism
- Sect: Gelug

Location
- Location: Zangla, Zanskar, Kargil district, Ladakh, India
- Country: India
- Interactive map of Zangla Fort
- Coordinates: 33°40′12″N 76°58′48″E

Architecture
- Style: Tibetan

Current day Zangla village has no monastery, only a nunnery. Zangla Palace is sometimes called Zangla Monastery due to a mistake probably first made by Tivadar Duka, biographer of Alexander Csoma de Kőrös, and later by Ervin Baktay, an Indologist who visited Zangla in 1928 to identify the locations related to Alexander Csoma de Kőrös. Suffering from malaria, he described Zangla Palace – probably due to the shrine and the monks living there – as a monastery.

Tsazar Monastery is a Buddhist monastery in the village of Tsa-zar, 6 kilometres south of Zangla, Zanskar, Kargil district, Ladakh, northern India, formerly part of the Zangla Kingdom.

Tsazar Monastery is home to a small number of lamas and has some notable wall paintings.

Hungarian philologist Sándor Kőrösi Csoma edited the first Tibetan-English dictionary while living at Zangla Palace in 1823. The dictionary was published in 1824.

== See also ==
- List of buddhist monasteries in Ladakh
- Geography of Ladakh
- Tourism in Ladakh
