= Bardan Monastery =

Buddhist monastery in Ladakh, India

Coordinates: 33.3983°N 76.9193°E

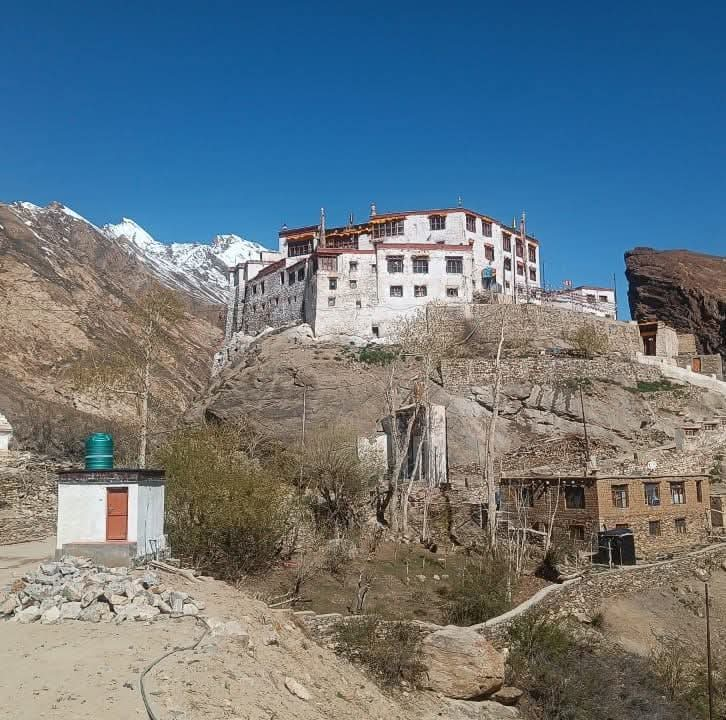

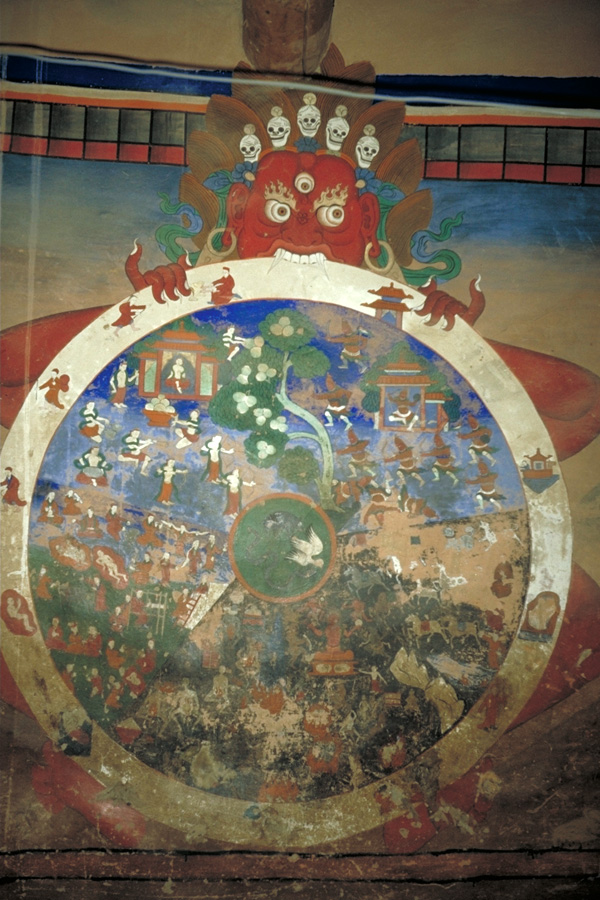
A thangka on the wall of Bardan representing the wheel of life

Bardan Monastery or Bardan Gompa is a 17th-century Buddhist monastery, approximately 12 kilometres south of Padum, in Zanskar, Ladakh, northern India at the side of the Lungnak river. The monastery also ran several smaller hermitages in the area.

The monastery consists of a large Dukhang or assembly hall which has some grand statues of Buddhist figures and several small stupas.

== See also ==
- List of buddhist monasteries in Ladakh
- Tourism in Ladakh
