= Zangla =

Zangla Sangla
- Town
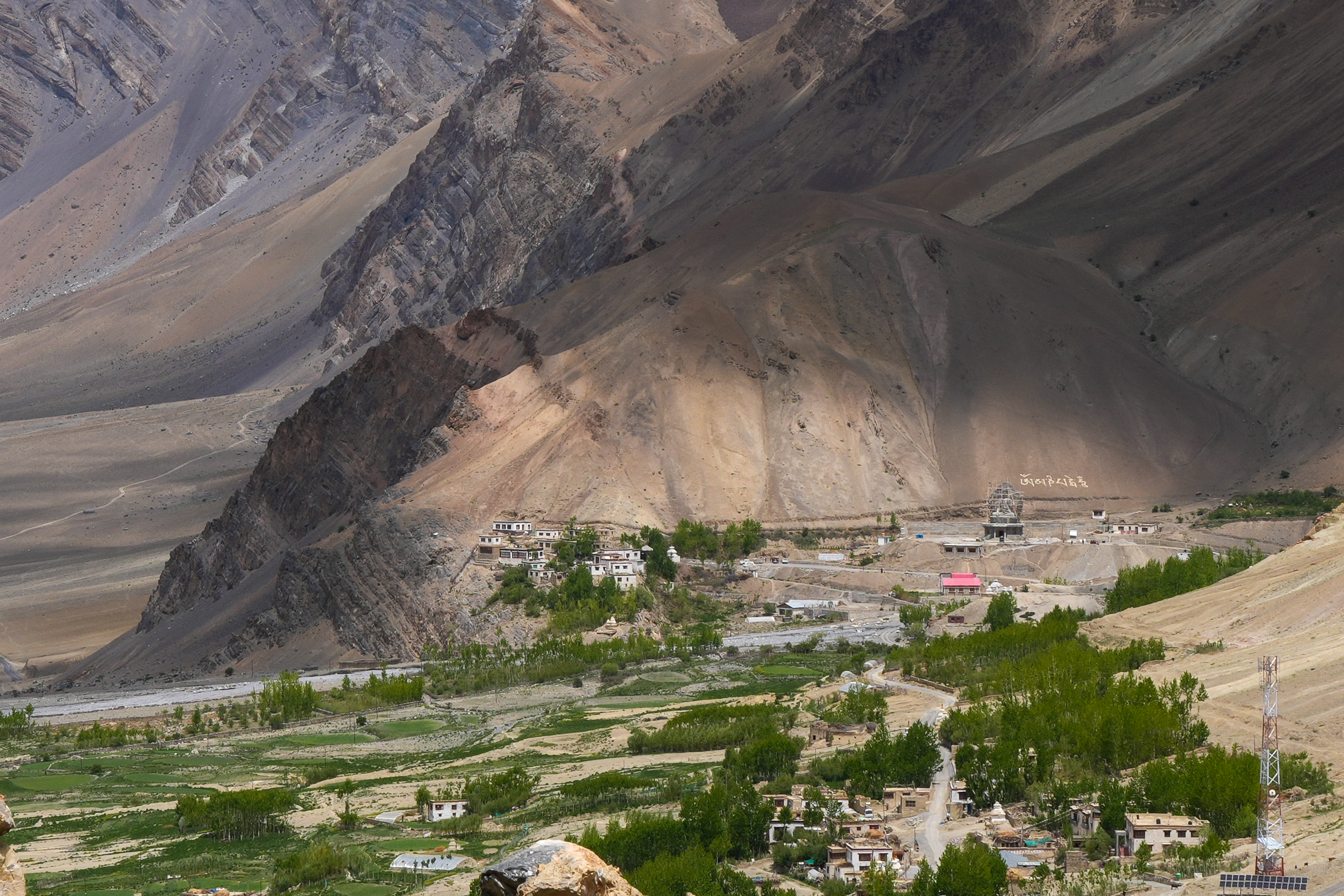

- Location in Ladakh, India Zangla (India)
- Coordinates: 33.67°N 76.98°E
- Country: India
- Union Territory: Ladakh
- District: Zanskar
- Tehsil: Zangla
- Named for: Zangla Fort

Government
  - Body: Sarpanch
- Elevation: 3,931 m (12,897 ft)

Population (2014)
  - Total: 400

Languages
  - Official: Ladakhi
- Time zone: UTC+5:30 (IST)
- Postal code: 194302

Zangla is a Town and one of tehsil of Zanskar district, in the Indian union territory of Ladakh. It is located 262 km (163 mi) southeast of Kargil city, the district headquarters, and 32 km (20 mi) northeast of Padum, the headquarters of Zanskar. An ancient ruined palace, known as Zangla Fort or Zangla Khar is located on a hilltop 1 km (0.62 mi) outside the village, believed to be 11th-century. The Buddhist nunnery in Zangla contains some impressive paintings.

== Geography ==
Zangla is located at 33.67°N 76.98°E on the right bank of the Zanskar River, and has an average elevation of 3,931 m (12,897 ft).

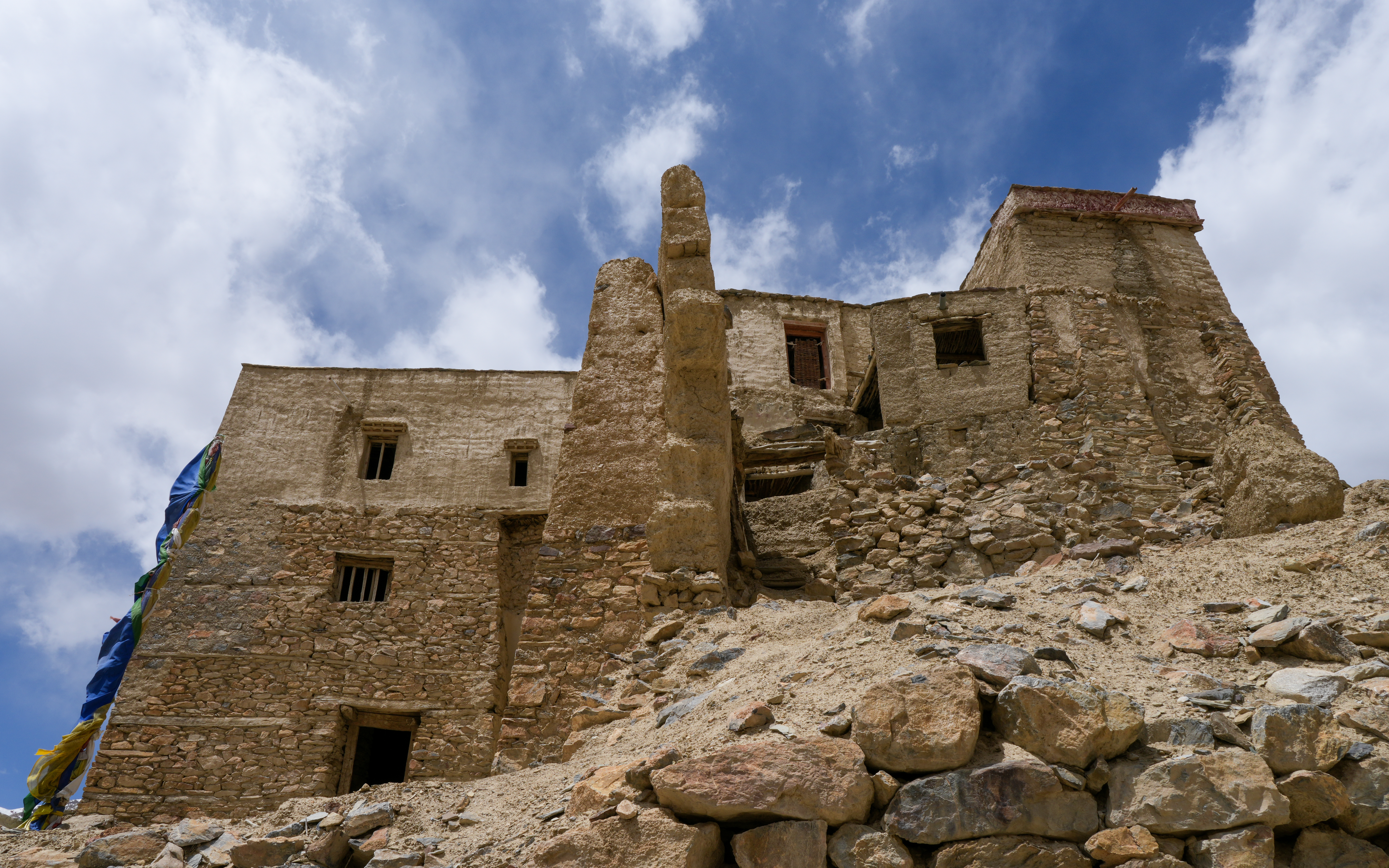
Zangla Khar (Fort)

== Demographics ==
According to the 2011 census of India, Zangla had 182 households. The literacy rate of Zangla village is 59.81%. In Zangla, Male literacy stands at 75.06% while the female literacy rate was 45.27%.

Demographics (2011 Census)
	Total	Male	Female
Population	954	471	483
Children aged below 6 years	108	58	50
Scheduled caste	0	0	0
Scheduled tribe	953	470	483
Literacy	59.81%	75.06%	45.27%
Workers (all)	443	227	216
Main workers (all)	231	–	–
Marginal workers (total)	212	99	113

== Transport ==
=== Road ===
Zangla is connected by road to other places in Ladakh and India by NH 301.

=== Rail ===
The nearest railway stations to Zangla are Sopore railway station and Srinagar railway station located at a distance of 480 km (300 mi) and 487 km (303 mi) respectively. The nearest major railway stations are Jammu Tawi railway station and Udhampur railway station, located 725 km (450 mi) and 658 km (409 mi) respectively from Zangla.

=== Air ===
The nearest airport is located in Kargil at a distance of 269 km (167 mi) but it is currently non-operational. The next nearest major airport is Leh Airport located at a distance of 476 km (296 mi).

== See also ==
- Ladakh
- Kargil
- Zanskar
