= Frederick Marx =

American film director (born 1955)

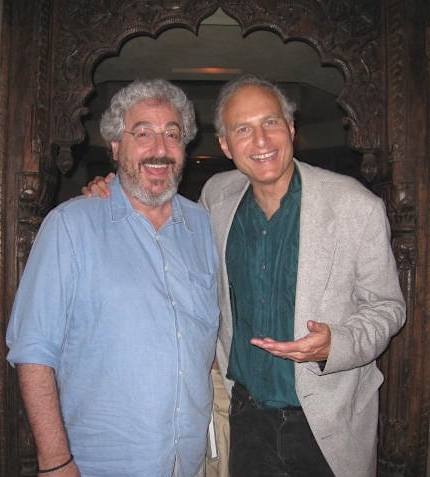
- Filmmakers Harold Ramis and Marx in June 2009
- Born: October 31, 1955 (age 70)
- Occupations: Film director; Film editor; Film producer; Author

Frederick Marx is a film producer/director/writer. He was named a Chicago Tribune Artist of the Year for 1994, a 1995 Guggenheim Fellow, and a recipient of a Robert F. Kennedy Special Achievement Award. Marx achieved international fame for co-writing the film Hoop Dreams with Steve James, the director of the film. It is one of the highest grossing non-musical documentaries in United States history.

== Career ==
Marx began his movie career as a film critic, and has worked both as a film distributor and exhibitor.

Marx graduated from the University of Illinois Laboratory High School in Urbana, Illinois in 1973.

Marx has a B.A. in Political Science and an MFA in filmmaking from Southern Illinois University at Carbondale. His interest in languages and foreign cultures is reflected in PBS' international human rights program Out of the Silence (1991), the personal essay Dreams from China (1989), and Learning Channel's Saving the Sphinx (1997). He consulted on Iranian-Kurdish director Bahman Ghobadi's feature Turtles Can Fly (2004) and was a teacher of Thai feature filmmaker Apichatpong Weerasethakul.

In 1993, Marx received an Emmy nomination for Higher Goals (1992) for Best Daytime Children's Special. The Unspoken (1999), Marx's first feature film, features performances from Russian actor Sergei Shnirev of the Moscow Art Theatre, and Harry Lennix.

Three of Marx's films premiered at the New York Film Festival.

Hoop Dreams (1994) is the film that first interested Marx in the welfare of teenage boys. Boys to Men? (2004), distributed by Media Education Foundation, takes that as its central theme.

A hobbyist songwriter, in 1991 Marx recorded a number of his songs collectively known as Rolling Steel. Two of those 11 songs are used over The Unspoken (1999) tail credits and one is used in Boys to Men.

Marx attended University Laboratory High School in Urbana, IL. In 1995, the school honored him with its Max Beberman Memorial Distinguished Alumni Award in recognition of his work as a filmmaker.

=== Hoop Dreams (1994) ===
Frederick Marx's film Hoop Dreams gained widespread acclaim after winning the Audience Award at the Sundance Film Festival. It was the first documentary ever chosen to close the New York Film Festival. The film appeared on over 100 "Ten Best" lists nationwide and was named Best Film of the Year by Roger Ebert, who also later named it as the Best Film of the Decade. The International Documentary Association named the Best Documentary of All Time. In 2005 it was added to the US Library of Congress’s National Film Registry. It won many major international awards, including the Producers Guild of America (PGA), the Motion Picture Editors Guild (MPEG), the Peabody Award, the National Society of Film Critics (NSFC), Prix Italia, and the Robert F. Kennedy Special Achievement Award.

Though Marx was nominated for editing Hoop Dreams by the Academy of Motion Picture Arts and Sciences (Oscars), the film itself was never nominated as Best Film or Best Documentary.

=== Journey From Zanskar (2010) ===
Journey From Zanskar tells the story of 17 children who leave home and family, possibly forever, in order to save their dying Tibetan culture. Leaving one of the most remote and desolate places on Earth – Zanskar, in northwest India – the expedition must travel on foot over 17,000 foot Himalayan passes. Written, produced, and directed by Frederick Marx, narrated by Richard Gere, featuring the Dalai Lama, the film tells the story of their journey. Distributed in France by Jupiter films, Frederick Marx is currently self-distributing Journey From Zanskar in the United States through his non-profit company Warrior Films.

=== Rites of Passage - short film (2015) ===
An estimated $500 billion is spent yearly on teen dysfunctions: drug and alcohol abuse, teen pregnancy and STDs, school dropouts and expulsions, gang and property crimes, traffic accidents, ADD, ADHD, depression and violence. Teenagers unconsciously push up against the confines of their own bodies, the rules of parents and society, and the capacity of their own minds and willpower to discover the true limits of their potential. The film explains how they need to be initiated into adulthood and the social benefits that will accrue.

=== At Death Do Us Part (book) (2018) ===
Marx shares the history, depth and the power of his relationship with his wife Tracy Seeley (who had breast cancer when they met), the journey they traveled together to her ultimate death, and his subsequent odyssey through the grief. He reflects on how his lifelong study of Buddhism (up to and including his being ordained as a Rinzai Zen Priest in the Hollow Bones Order), his work with the ManKind Project and his studies in mature masculinity, and his Rites of Passage work, all helped pull him through.

== Filmography ==
- Rites of Passage (feature film, in production)
- Surviving Home (2017) (Producer)
- The Tatanka Alliance (2015)
- The World As It Could Be (2014-2015)
- Journey From Zanskar (2010)
- Boys To Men? (2004) (documentary mini-series)
- The Unspoken (1999)
- The Mankind Project (MKP) Homecoming Chicago (1998)
- Saving the Sphinx (1997) (Learning Channel Special) (Exec. Producer, Producer)
- Joey Skaggs: Bullshit & Balls (1996)
- A Hoop Dreams Reunion (1995) (PBS-TV Special) (Producer, Editor, Talent)
- Hoop Dreams (1994) (Producer, Editor, Writer)
- Higher Goals (1992) (PBS-TV Special) (Producer, Editor, Talent)
- Inside/Out (1991) (play excerpt)
- Out of the Silence (1991) (Co-Producer, Editor)
- Hiding Out For Heaven (1989)
- House of Unamerican Activities (1984)
- Dream Documentary (1981)

== Bibliography ==
- At Death Do Us Part: A Grieving Widower Attains Healing After the Loss of his Wife to Cancer (2018)
- Rites to a Good Life: Everyday Rituals of Healing and Transformation (2020)
