= Padum =

Town in Union Territory of Ladakh

Padum Padam
- Town
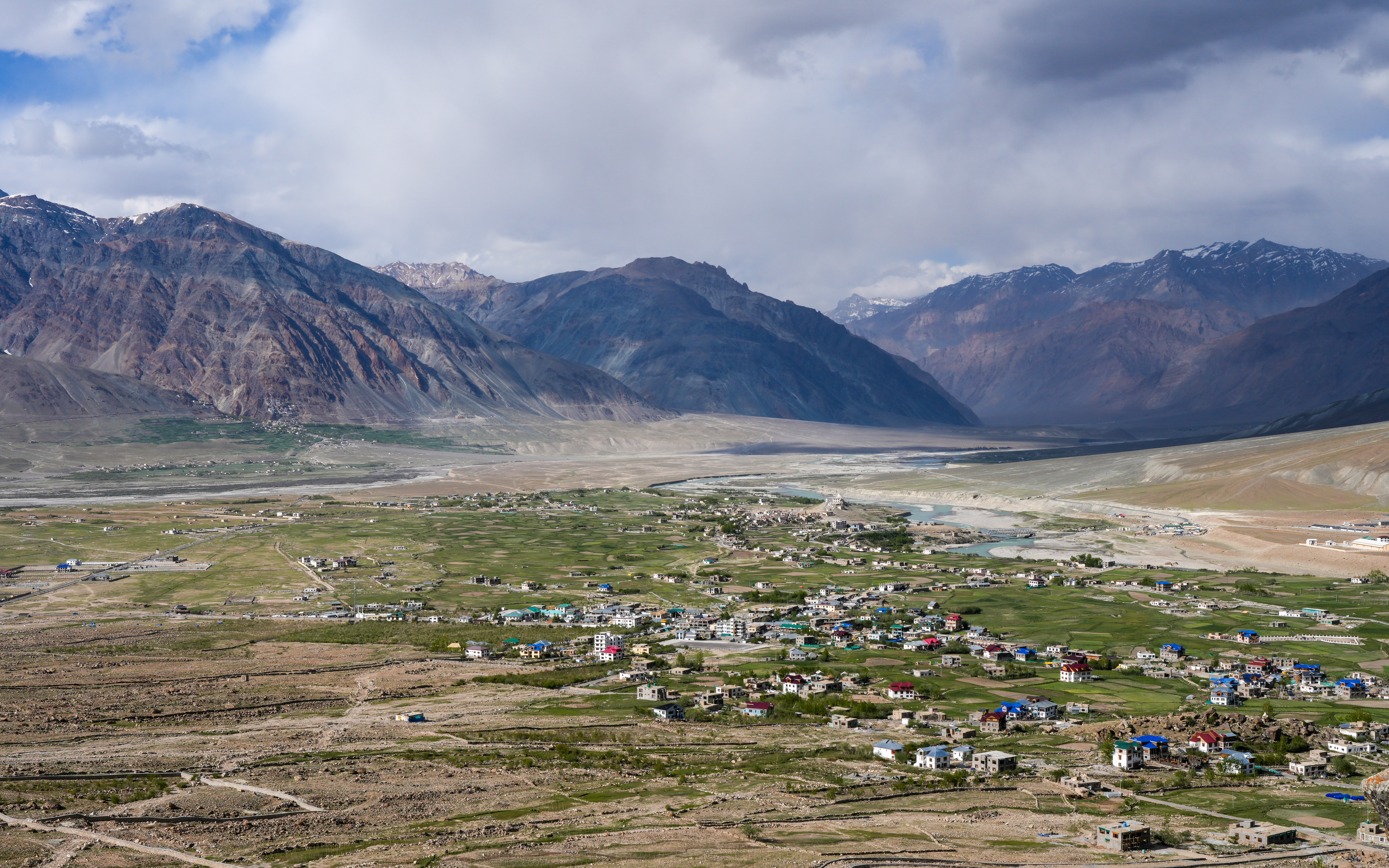
- View of Padum town from the southwest

- Location in Ladakh, India
- Coordinates: 33°27′50″N 76°52′43″E
- Country: India
- Union Territory: Ladakh
- District: Zanskar
- Tehsil: Padum

Government
  - Type: Autonomous Hill Development Council
  - Body: LAHDC, Zanskar
- Elevation: 3,669 m (12,037 ft)

Population (2011)
  - Total: 1,550

Languages
  - Official: Ladakhi, Hindi, Tibetan
- Time zone: UTC+5:30 (IST)
- Postal code: 194302
- Vehicle registration: LA 01 XXXX
- Website: kargil.nic.in

Padum (also known as Padam) is a town and the administrative headquarter of the Zanskar district of Ladakh in India. Named after the Buddhist guru Padmasambhava, it was historically one of the two main capitals of the Zanskar Kingdom, the other being Zangla.

== Geography ==
Padum is at the centre of the tri-armed Zanskar River valley. It has an average elevation of 3,669 m (12,037 ft). There are several villages to the north-east of Padum leading to Karsha monastery.

== Administration ==
The sub-divisional capital Padum is a town of the Zanskar sub-division or tehsil in the Kargil district of Ladakh state, India. The Zanskar River flows through the valley from its source at the Drang Drung glacier of the Pensi La. The Zanskar River joins the Lungnak River near Pibiting village.

In August 2024, the Central Government proposed creation of 5 additional districts in the union territory of Ladakh, including Zanskar district from the southeastern part of Kargil district with Padum as likely HQ as the demand for Zanskar as new district is more seven decades old. Lungnak or Zangla likely to be upgraded to tehsil for the reduced travel time for the administrative work.

== People ==
=== Demography ===
2001 census of India population of Padum town is about 2,000 people. The traditional heart of the village is below the gompa and Palace khar (now in ruins) where two large chortens stand above old buildings.

=== Culture ===
Padum is largely inhabited by people of Tibetan descent who follow Tibetan Buddhism. There is also a sizable Muslim population that's been established for several centuries who share several aspects of Zanskari culture and origins.

== Tourism ==
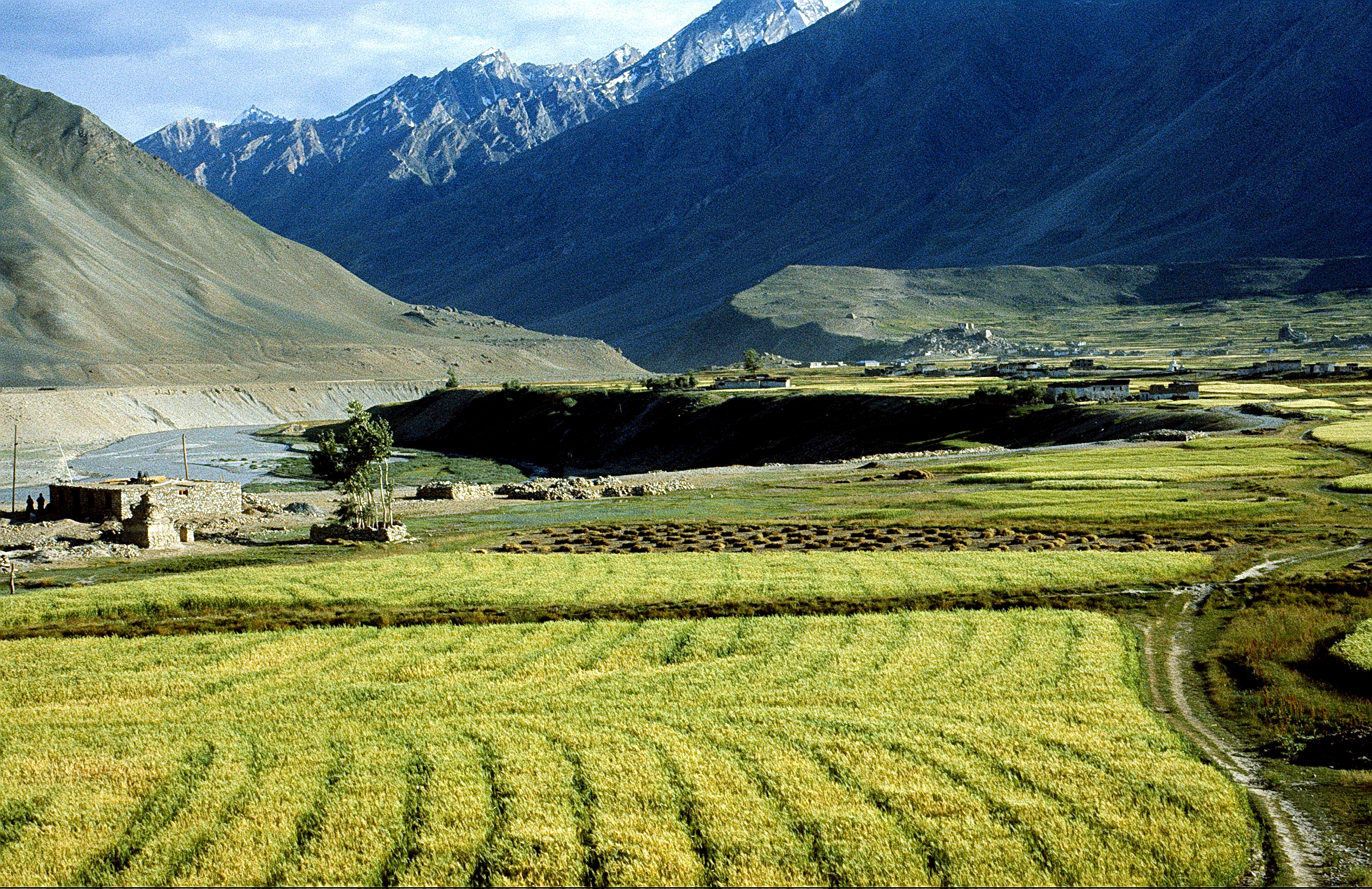
Padum from Pibiting village in the north.

A number of notable Buddhist monasteries are located near Padum, including Bardan Monastery and Karsha Monastery and the newly built Dalai Lama Photang. The Phugtal Monastery is accessible from here. It is a day's trek from Dorzang, the end of the road leading from Padum. Chadar trek passes through Padum.

Padum has several hotels, homestays and restaurants for tourists. Padum has a post office, internet cafes and telephone booths.

== Connectivity ==
=== Transport ===
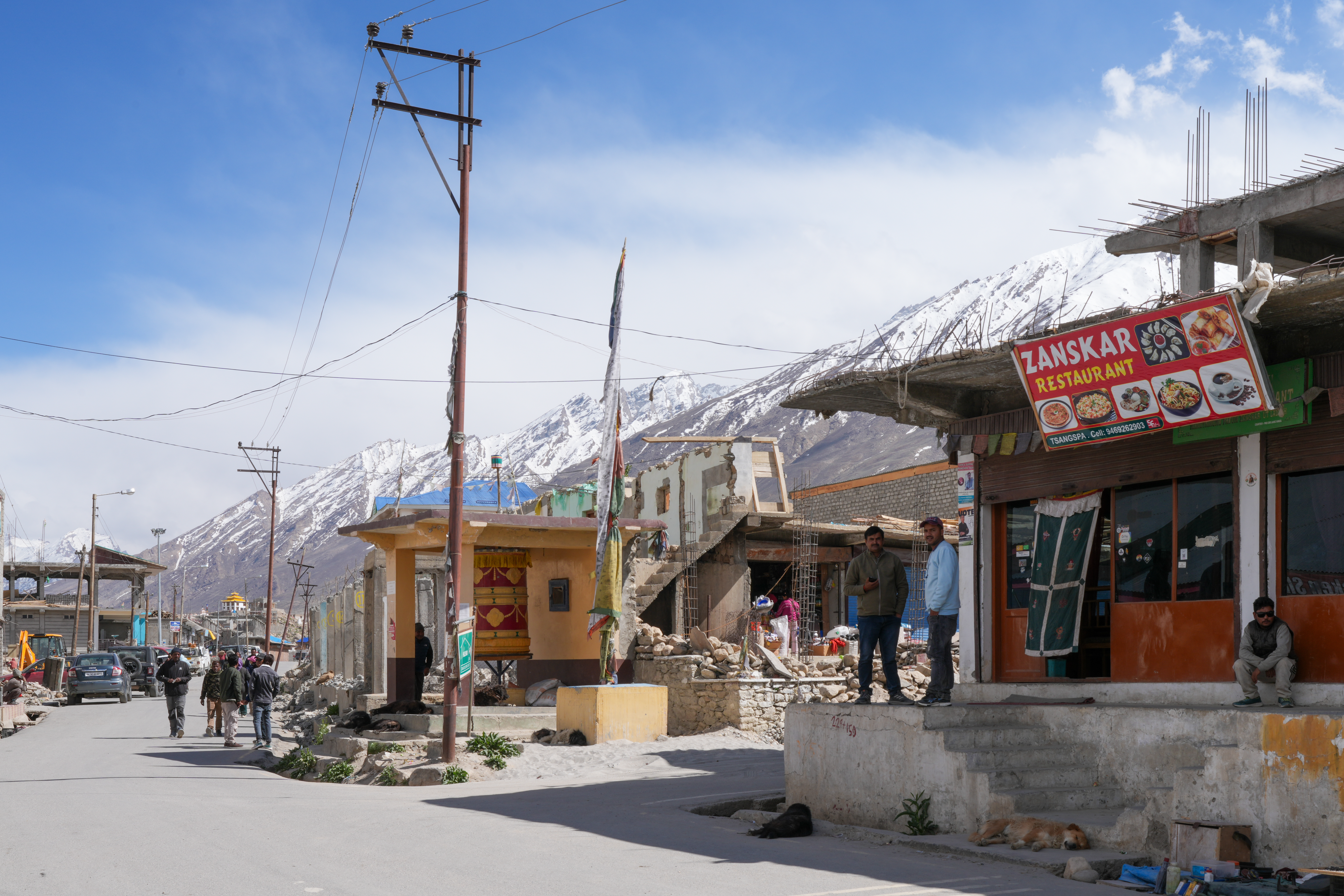
Padum market, Padum-Darcha road.

Nearest airports are Kushok Bakula Rimpochee Airport at Leh and Kargil Airport.

Jammu Tawi railway station, the nearest railway station, is 750 km south. Under construction Bhanupli–Leh line will have a railway station at Debring about 150 km southeast of Padum.

The Nimmu–Padum–Darcha road (NPD Road) connects Padum directly to Leh in the east and to Darcha (on NH3 Leh-Manali Highway) in Himachal Pradesh. The 235 km (146 mi) long 2-lane NH301 Padum-Pensi La-Kargil Highway connects Padum to Kargil city (on NH1). A road (now NH301) was constructed in 1980 from NH1 at Kargil over Pensi La, which is 235 km away. The 145 km road to Darcha passing through Shinkula pass is now operational, connecting to the Manali-Leh Highway. A bus operates between 1 June and 30 September, after which the Manali–Leh (NH21) highway is normally closed. Other roads, including the NH1 highway from Leh to Srinagar via Kargil, remain open until the end of October.

=== Internet and phone ===
Airtel has started providing its mobile services in Padum since 2023. Jio Has started providing its 4G connectivity from 2020, and now Padum is also connected to 4G network.

== Gallery ==
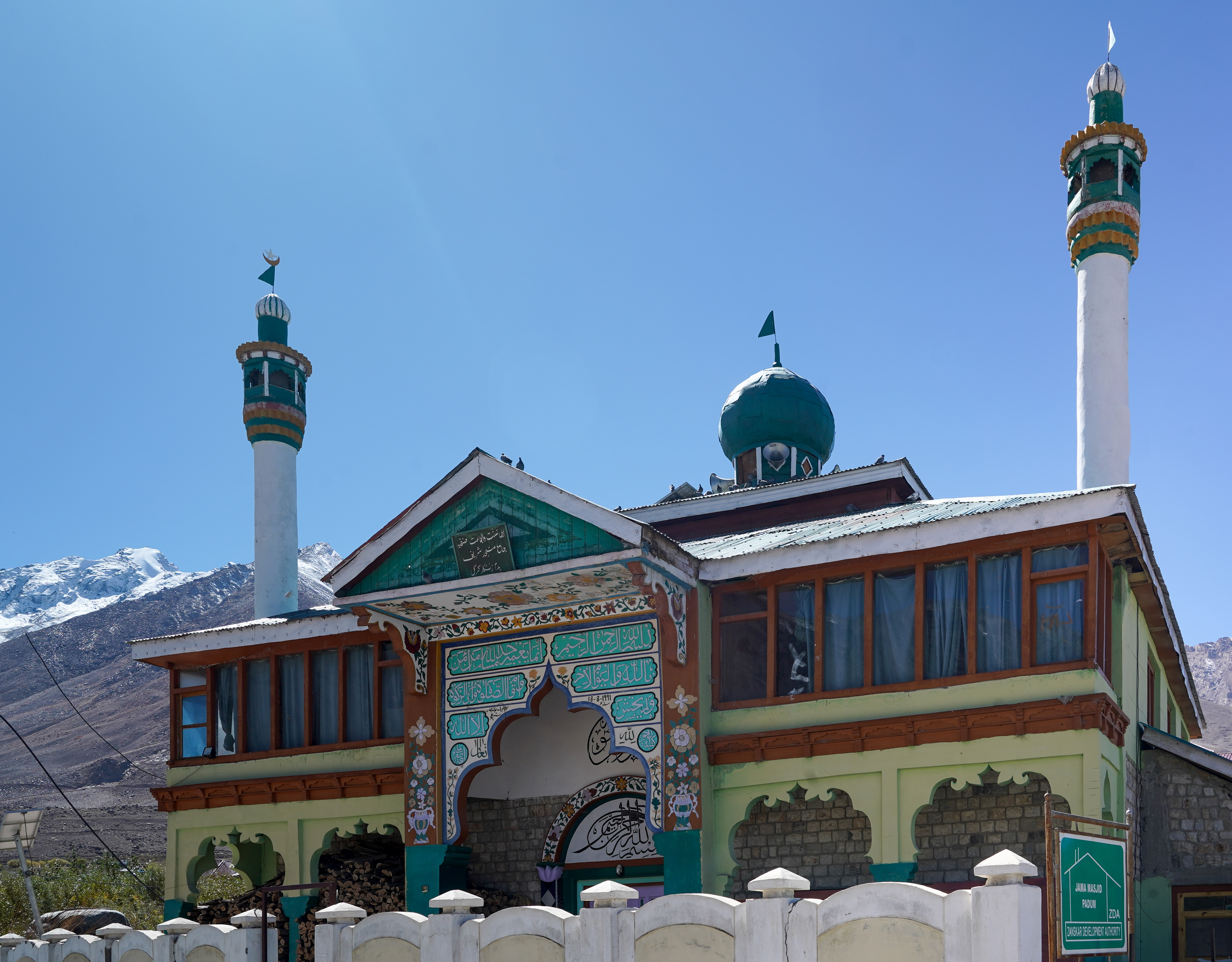
Jama Masjid in Padum.

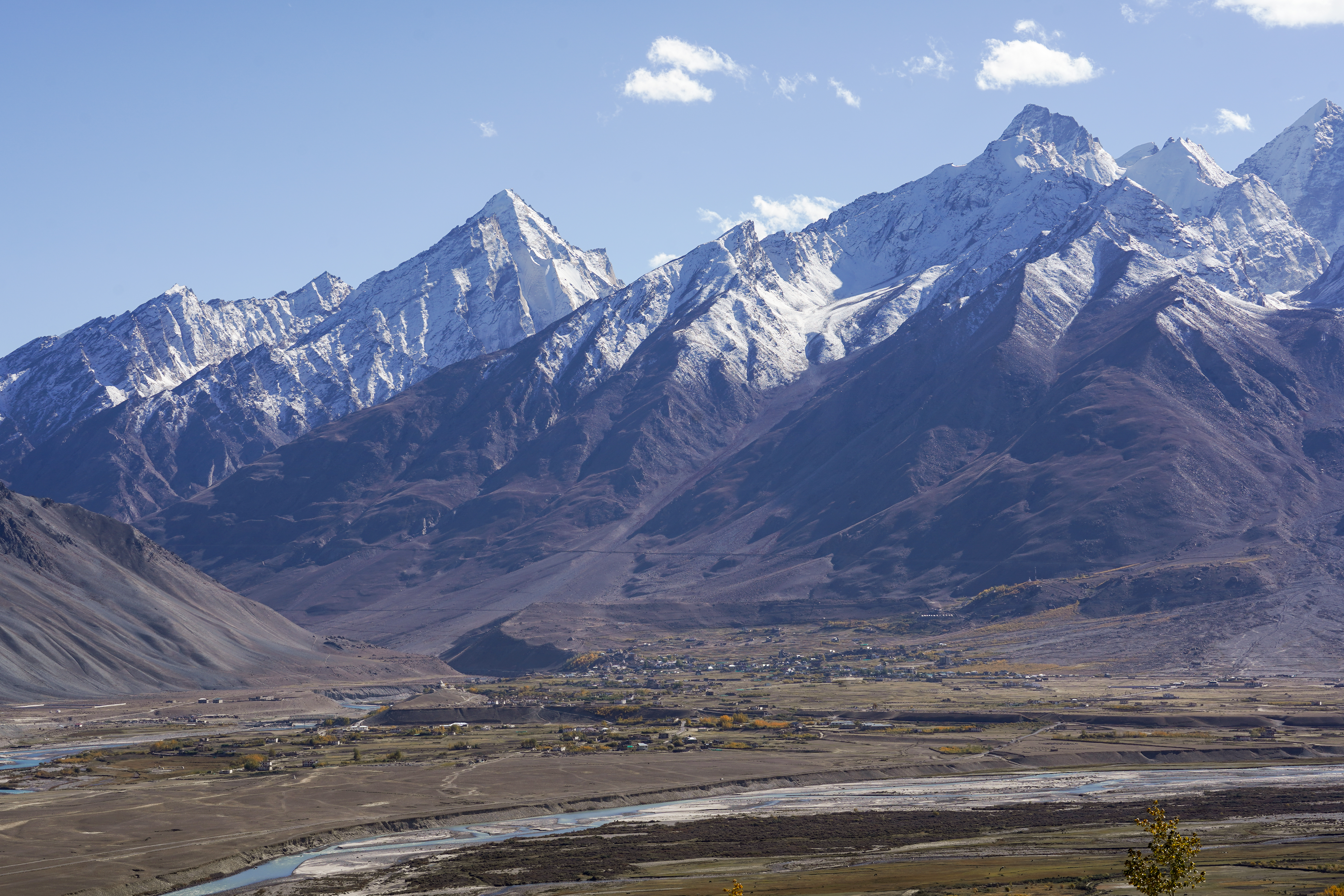
Looking south to Padum and Pibiting from Karsha Monastery.

== See also ==
- India-China Border Roads
- Line of Actual Control
- List of disputed territories of India

== Bibliography ==
- Janet Rizvi. (1996). Ladakh: Crossroads of High Asia. Second Edition. Oxford University Press, Delhi. ISBN 0-19-564546-4.
- Osada et al. (2000). Mapping the Tibetan World. Yukiyasu Osada, Gavin Allwright, and Atsushi Kanamaru. Reprint: 2004. Kotan Publishing, Tokyo. ISBN 0-9701716-0-9.
- Schettler, Margaret & Rolf (1981). Kashmir, Ladakh & Zanskar. Lonely Planet Publications. South Yarra, Victoria, Australia. ISBN 0-908086-21-0.
