= Karsha Monastery =

Tibetan Buddhist monastery at Pensi-la, Ladakh, India

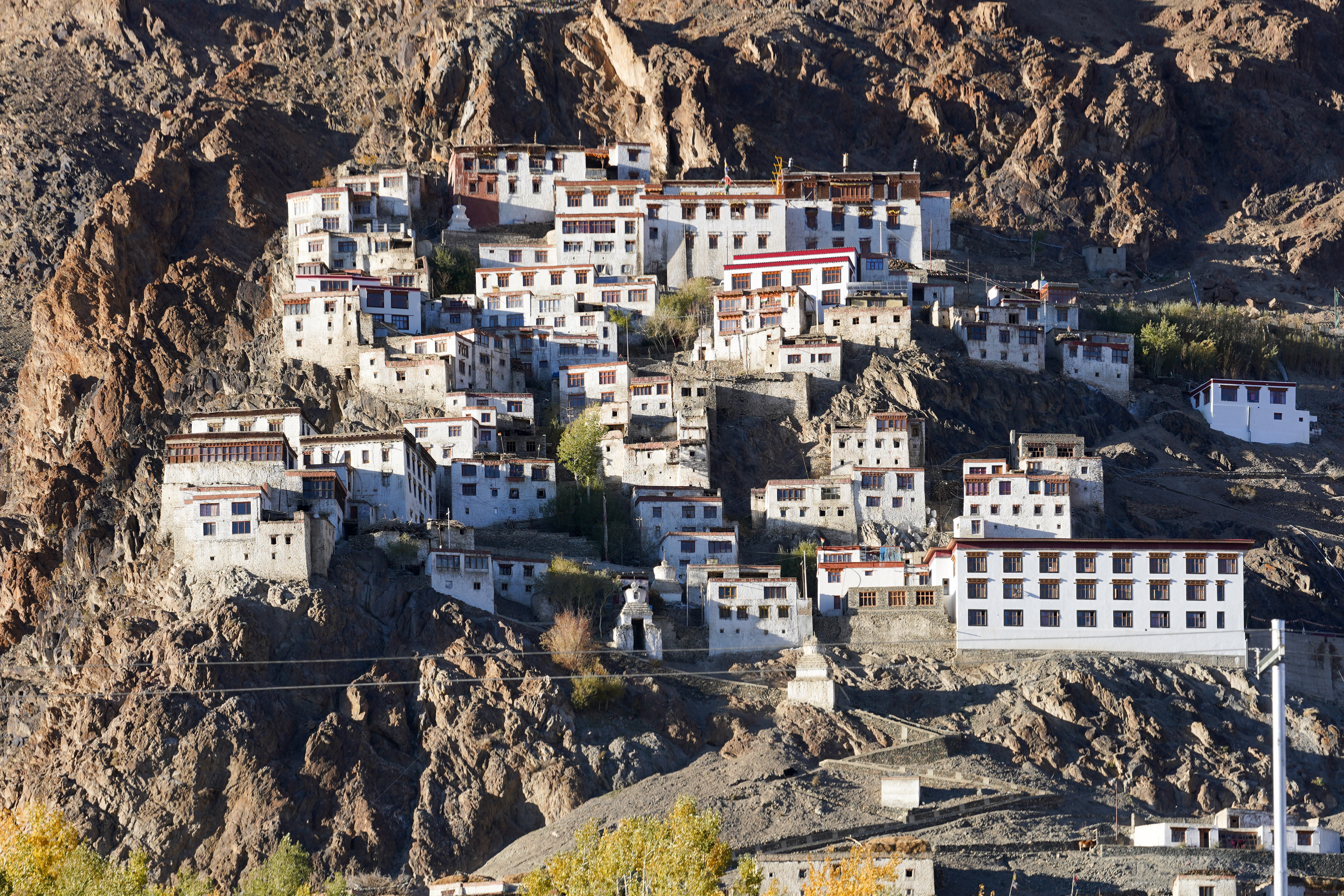
- Karsha Gompa in the Padum Valley

- Location within India

Religion
- Affiliation: Tibetan Buddhism
- Sect: Gelug
- Festival: Karsha Gostor

Location
- Location: Pensi La, Padum Valley, Ladakh, India
- Coordinates: 33°32′3.78″N 76°54′25.35″E

Architecture
- Founder: Phagspa Shesrab

Karsha Monastery or Karsha Gompa is a Buddhist monastery in the Padum Village of the Zanskar region of the union territory of Ladakh in northern India. The Doda River flows past the monastery from its source at the Drang Drung Glacier of the Pensi La (14,500 feet (4,400 m)). It was founded by the translator Phagspa Shesrab. The monastery, also known by the name Karsha Chamspaling, was founded by Phagspa Shesrab, under the Gelugpa Order or Yellow Hats. It is 11 km north of Padum in Zanskar River valley.

== History ==
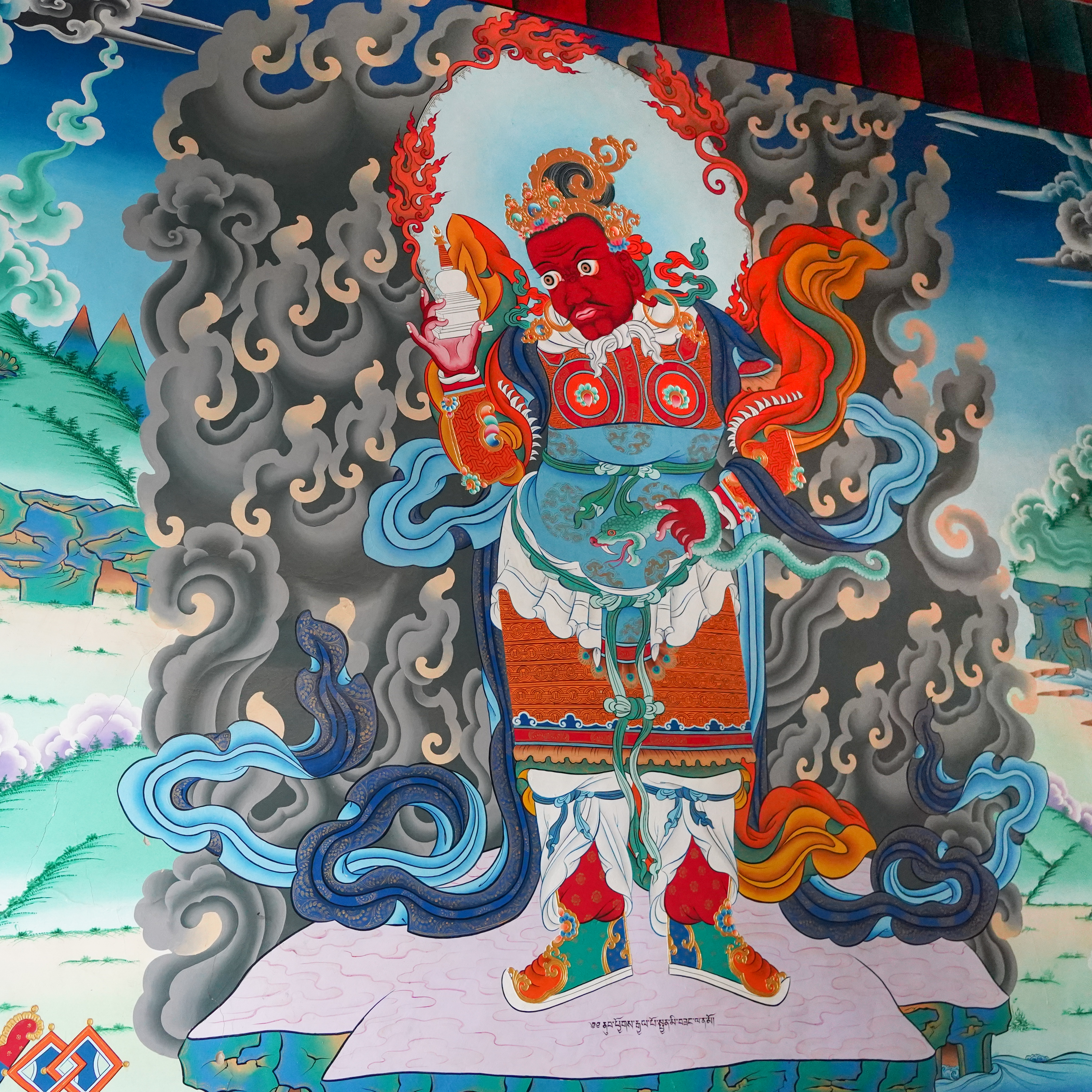
Mural inside the gompa

Karsha is the largest and most important monastery in Zanskar. It is attributed to Padmasambhava, and there are ancient rock-carvings at the site. The oldest remaining structure, an Avalokiteshvara temple, Chuk-shik-jal, contains wall paintings which seem to associate it with the era of Rinchen Zangpo (958–1055).

The monastery is under the control of the younger brother of the Dalai Lama. Behind his seat in the chapel is a statue of Lhaso Cho Rinpoche, brought from Lhasa in the 1960s, with a golden crown decorated with carnelian and turquoise. The most important festival, known as the Karsha Gustor, is held with masked cham dances on the 26th to the 29th day of the 11th Tibetan month, which is usually in January.

Mons of the Khesa race were dominant in the past in the region of western Himalayas. The Mons have been Buddhist in the region from the time of the Kushan dynasty, established by Emperor Kanishka. Mons, the dominant population in the Zanskar valley, and are said to belong to an Aryan race linked to Kaniskha's period as their features do not match those of the local tribes or the Mongolians. Mons are credited with building 30 monasteries, chortens and temples, including the Kursha Monastery in the main Zanskar valley; some of the other monasteries they built are: Teta, Muni, Phugtal, Pune, Burdal, Togrimo, Padum, Pipting, Tondhe, Zangla, Linshot and Sumda. Gelugpa monastery is another important monastery in Khursha village, which has an excellent display of mural arts.

== Structure ==
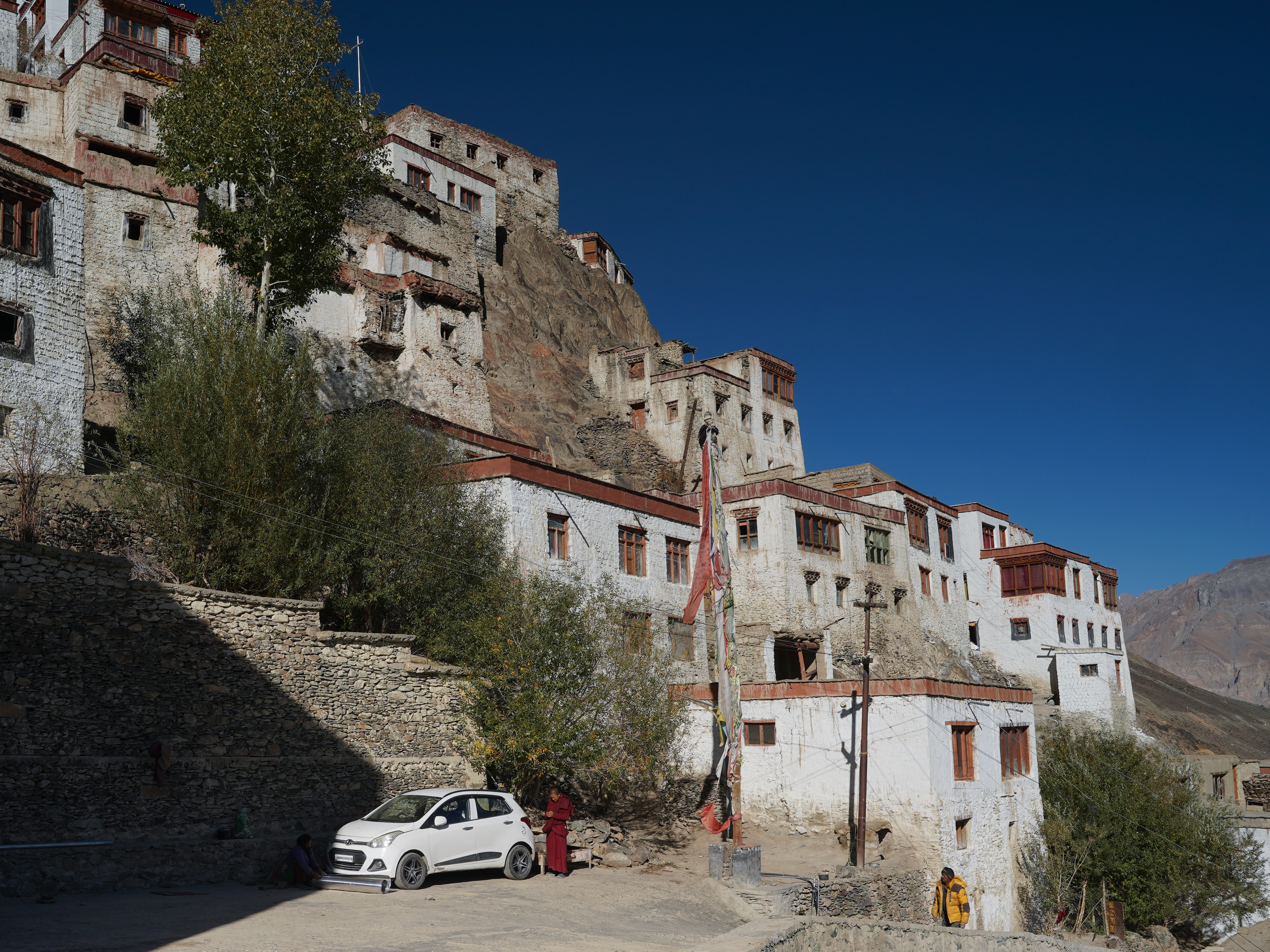
Multiple tiers of buildings

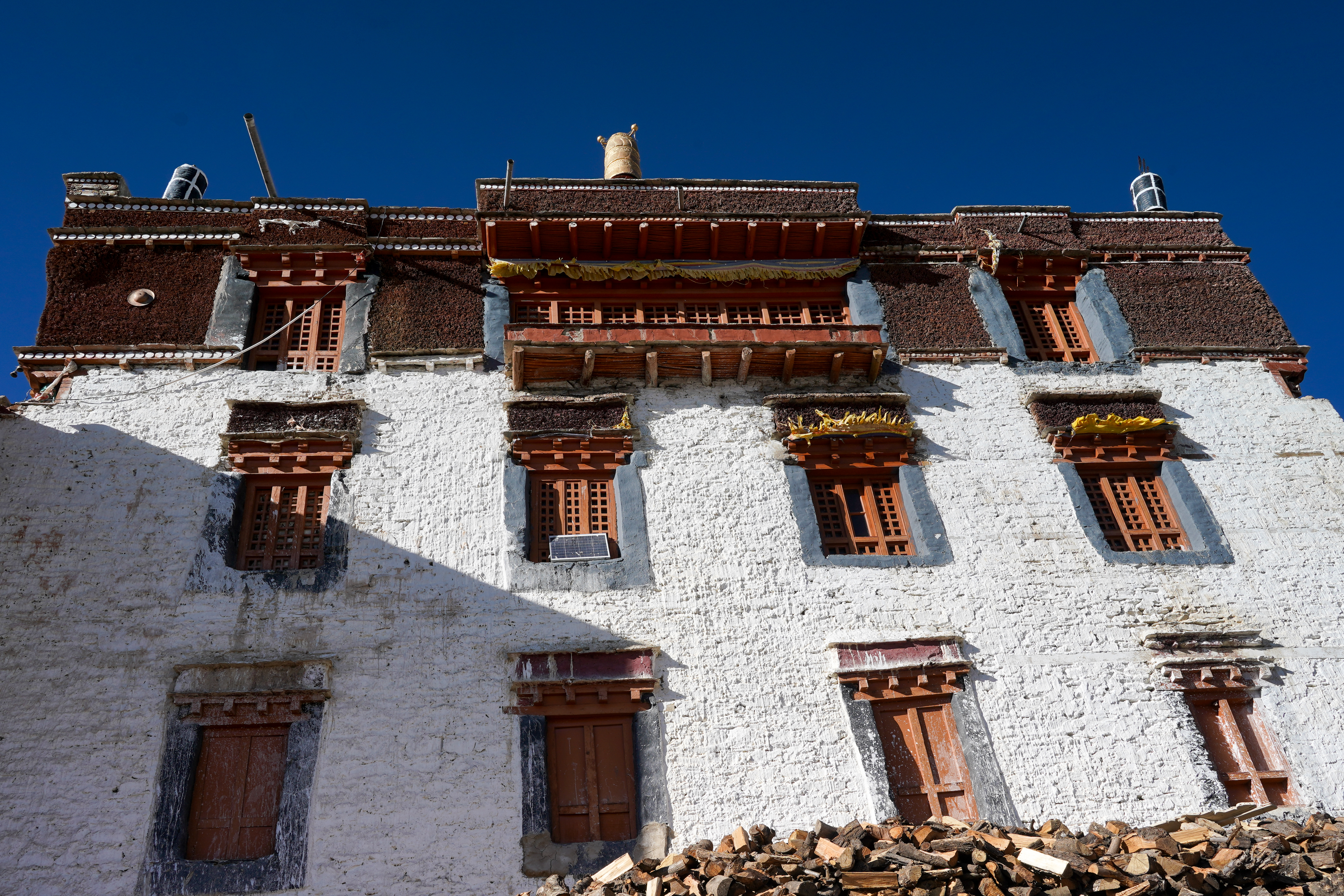
South facade of main building at the top

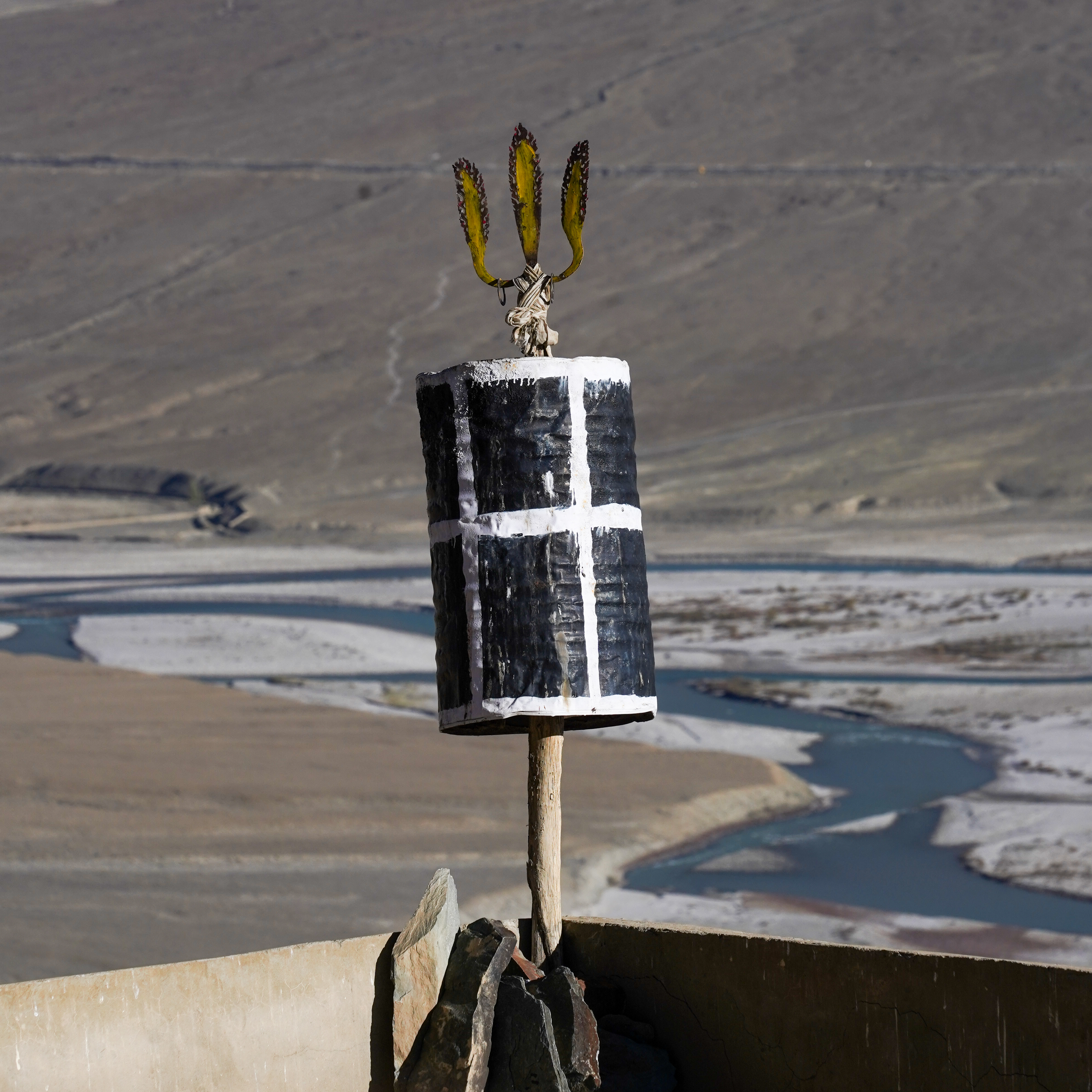
Trident on roof at the top

The monastery, the largest monastery of Zanskar, has a number of shrines and has been embellished with exquisite paintings by the Lama Dzadpa Dorje. It also houses the relics of Dorje Rinchen. 100 monks reside in this monastery. The popular festival held in the monastery precincts is called the Gustor festival, celebrated between the 26th and 29th day of the sixth month of the Tibetan calendar, when events such as the sacred masked cham dance take place. The monastery also has bone relics of Dorje Rinchen and serves as the residence of approximately 100 monks.

Other temples built close to the monastery are Thugsjechhenpoi Lhakhang and the Lhakhang Karpo. Other Monasteries in the vicinity are the Khagsar Monastery, Purang Monastery and Phagspa Monastery. Dorjee Zong Nunnery, founded in the 14th century and one of the oldest monastic centres in Zanskar, is located at the top of the valley. In the nunnery, a sacred image of 11-headed Avaloketeshvara is deified.

In the Karsha monastery there is a cloth painting, unfolded by the Lamas, which is intricately embroidered in gold and colourful threads on an orange cloth, which depicts Buddha surrounded by his tutelary deities.

"It [Karsha] was built against the craggy hillside like a massive white fortress, with deep-set, black-edged windows. From a distance, village, gompa and mountainside were fused together, ... It was a medieval world. Lamas of all ages gossiped and giggled, lounging on the steps in front of heavy wooden doors with iron studs. In the evening sun the angles of the roof and squared lintels cast black-and-white shadows in geometrical patterns. Mastiffs still sheltering from the day's heat stretched out in shady corners squalid with gompa debris - old bones, pieces of cloth, and the odd tattered boot. Despite the midsummer warmth the old lamas' maroon cloaks were of heavy tweed. The cheeky, shaven-headed boys wore their cotton cloaks slipped off one shoulder and their yellow hats at a rakish angle. A bearskin hung above the door into the main shrine, its massive head loured from above as though it might at any minute bare its fangs.
Lamas wearing red and yellow robes and brocade hats sat in lines to chant the evening prayers. Serving lamas, two to each heavy copper kettle, moved up and down pouring salt tea. Ibex heads looked down from the ceiling, and there was a banner depicting running deer, yaks and a leopard, partially hidden by dust and cobwebs. Murals illuminating scenes from the life of the Buddha glowed with rich pigments, and multicoloured tsampa and ghi offerings were displayed like exotic wedding cakes. The last rays of the sun glinted off the gold brocade in the altar cloth and off the rows of thankas. Images of the Buddha, three times the size of man, stood above the altar, dominating the theatrical scene. Trumpets blasted, cymbals clashed and conch shells were blown through cupped hands, the sound escaped through the closed windows and curtained doorways into the courtyards and out across the valley."

=== Chorten ===
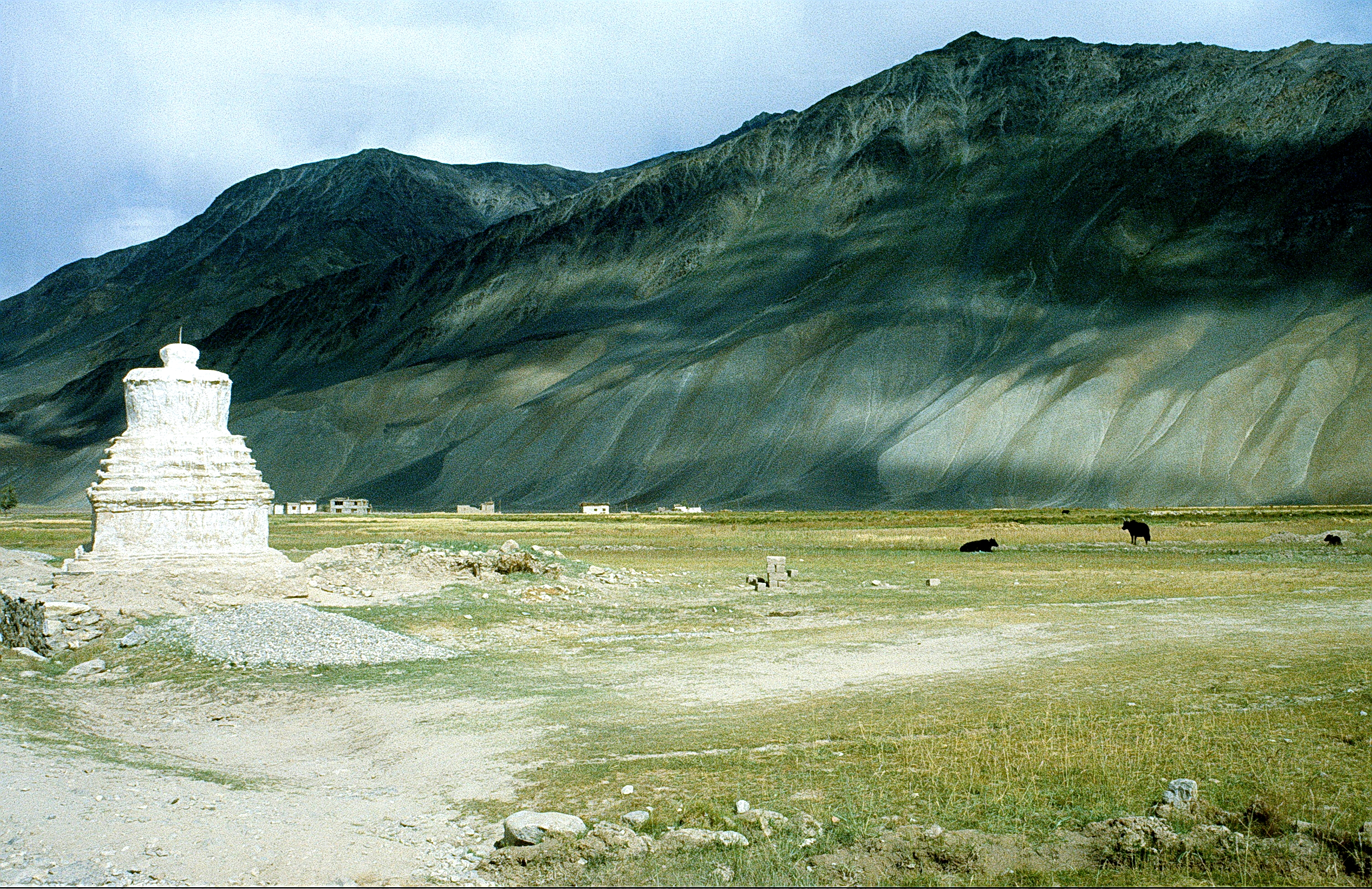
The chorten, near Padum, on the Doda plain on way to Kursha gompa, Zanskar valley

A chorten in the precincts of Kursha monastery houses the mummified body of an incarnate lama called the Rinchen Zangpo, sealed in a silver-lined wooden box. During the Indo-Pakistan war, the silver sheet covering of the chorten was ransacked, which resulted in exposure of the wooden frame work of the reliquary. It was later refurbished and painted.

Chortens not only represent various stages of the spiritual attainments of Sakyamuni Buddha, as a memorial structure but also intern the physical body of (Buddha kapala). In the dome of the chorten, in addition to the mortal remains of saints and lamas, their spiritual elements are also said to be infused. Chorten are identified with a perfect human body.

== Geography ==
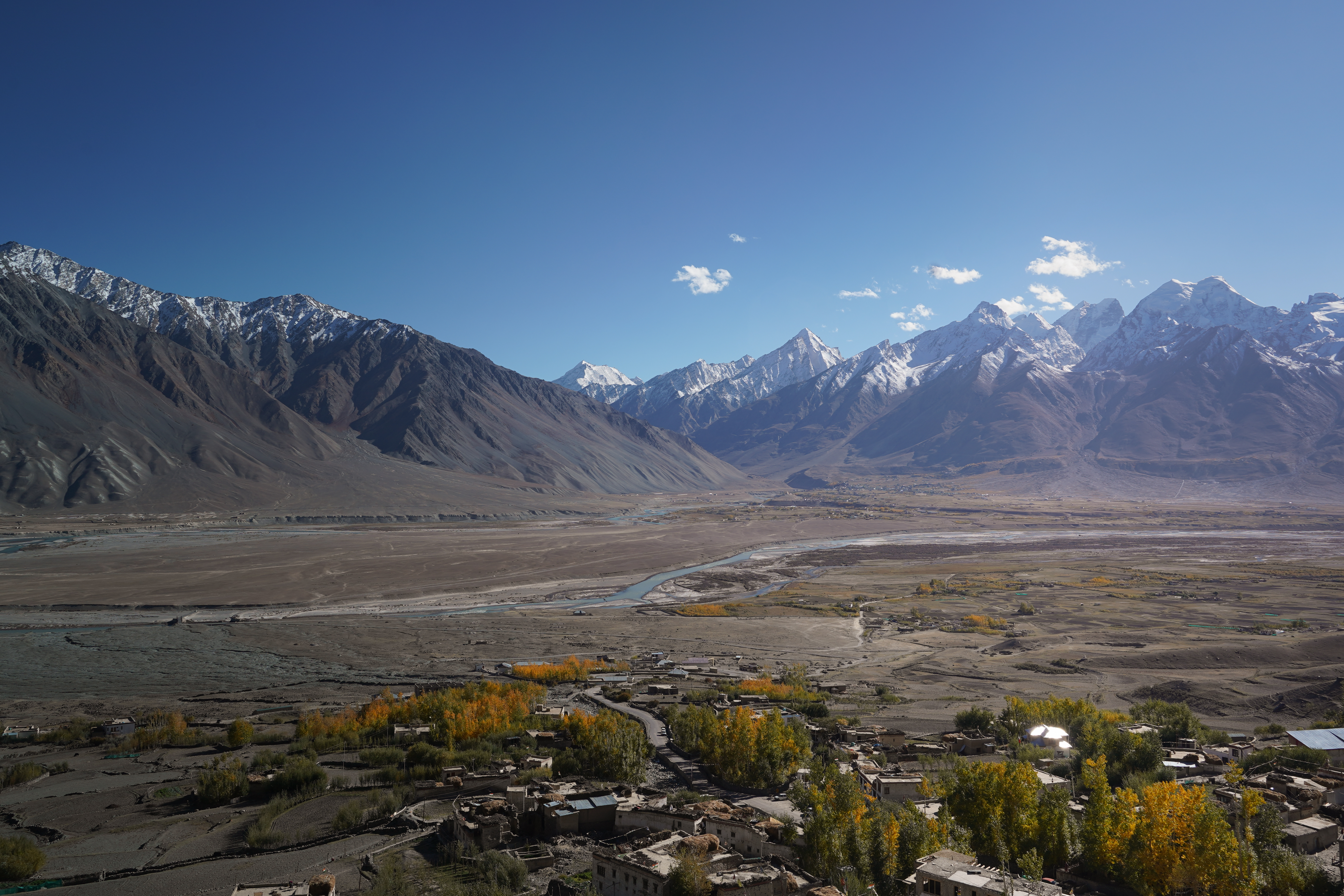
Gompa overlooks tri-armed valley, Karsha village in foreground. View to the south.

Karsha is at the confluence of the Lungtsi river, which raises from the Lingti peak of Doda basin that forms the Zanskar River. Zanskar takes a turn at Karsha and flows in a northwesterly direction to eventually join the Indus River near Nimmu in Ladakh. Below the Khlangpu peak (5,160 metres (16,930 ft)) of the Zanskar hill range, the river flows in deep ravines near Karsha monastery. It is in this stretch of the Zanskar river in the Lungti and the Doda valleys that there is a maximum concentration of villages.

== Visitor information ==
It is a highly revered monastery in Khurshan village, which is 14 kilometres (8.7 mi)) from Padum village. The village has a market, school, a dispensary, and post and telegraph offices. Interesting information for visitors to the village is of the facilities available for river rafting in the Zanskar river; it is a five hours ride on a very rough river, in the gorge portion of the Zanskar river called the "Grand Canyon" of Asia, in freezing cold conditions. The rafting starts from Remala and ends in Karsha village near Padum (30 kilometres (19 mi)) rafting in the river in 'Rapids of Class II category' considered suitable for beginners); after completing the rafting, a short walk from the camp would lead to the Karsha monastery for an evening prayer. Zanskar valley is closed from November to May due to heavy snow conditions.

Leh is the nearest airport; while Srinagar is also another airport that could be used. Kargil (6 kilometres (3.7 mi) from Pakistan border) is at a distance of 240 kilometres (150 mi) from Padum, which is a further 14 kilometres (8.7 mi) away from the monastery. Karsha is now accessible directly from Manali, Himachal Pradesh via the new Nimmu–Padum–Darcha road that goes over the Shingo La pass separating Lahaul and Zanskar.

== See also ==
- List of buddhist monasteries in Ladakh
- Tourism in Ladakh
