= Zanskar district =

District in Ladakh, India

- District of Ladakh
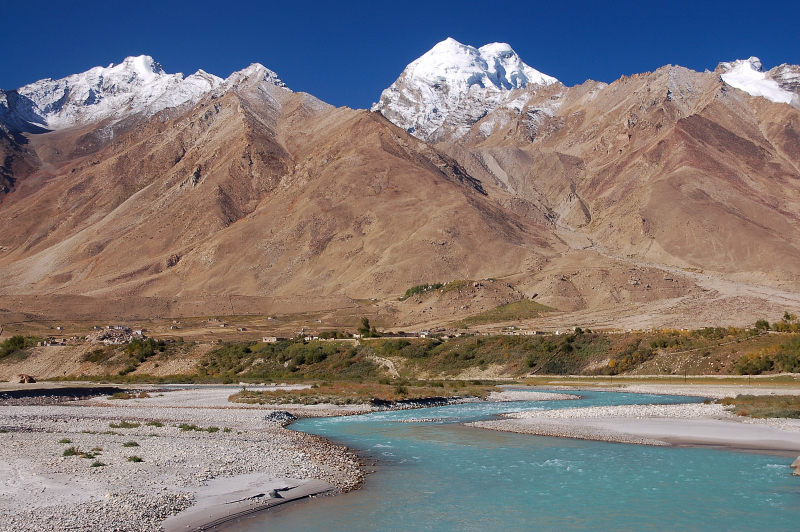
- View of Zanskar Valley
- Interactive map of Zanskar district
- Coordinates: 33°28′6″N 76°52′41″E
- Country: India
- Union Territory: Ladakh
- Headquarters: Padum
- Established: 27 April 2026

Government
  - Deputy Commissioner: Sh. Omkar Rajendra Gundage IAS
  - Lok Sabha constituencies: Ladakh
  - MP: Mohmad Haneefa

Area
  - Total: 6,688 km^{2} (2,582 sq mi)

Population (2011)
  - Total: 13,793
  - Density: 2.062/km^{2} (5.341/sq mi)

Languages
  - Official: Hindi, English, Ladakhi, Urdu and Purgi
  - Spoken: Zangskari, Shina, Balti, Tibetan
- Time zone: UTC+05:30 (IST)

Zanskar is an administrative district in the Union Territory of Ladakh in India with headquarters at Padum. It was carved out of the Kargil district in 2026 to give autonomy to this historically isolated Himalayan region. Covering an area of approximately 6,688 km^{2} (2,582 mi^{2}) at elevations between 3,600 and 4,000 m (11,800 and 13,100 ft), Zanskar is a high-altitude semi-desert lying between the Great Himalayas and the Zanskar Range. The district contains the Lungnak and Doda river valleys and has 13,793 inhabitants, who predominately speak the Zangskari language and adhere to Tibetan Buddhism. The Karsha, Phugtal, and Sani monasteries are important religious centers. Economically, the population relies on high-altitude subsistence farming and tourism. Access to the district has traditionally been difficult due to high mountain passes, with a frozen route over the Zanskar River being an alternative during the winter. Roads such as NH 301, which connects Padum to Kargil, have lessened the district's isolation.

== Etymology ==
Zanskar (Standard Tibetan: ཟངས་དཀར་, romanized: zangs dkar) appears as "Zangskar" mostly in academic studies in social sciences (anthropology, gender studies), reflecting the Ladakhi pronunciation, although the Zanskari pronunciation is Zãhar (IPA: /zãː.har/). Older geographical accounts and maps may use the alternate spelling "Zaskar". An etymological study (Snellgrove and Skorupsky, 1980) of the name reveals that its origin might refer to the natural occurrence of copper in this region, the Tibetan word for which is "Zangs". The second syllable however seems to be more challenging as it has various meanings: "Zangs-dkar" (white copper), "Zangs-mkhar" (copper palace), or "Zangs-skar" (copper star). Others claim it derives from zan = copper + skar = valley. John Crook (1994) partly shares this interpretation but suggests that the origin of this name might also be "Zan-mKhar" (food palace), because the staple food crops are so abundant in an otherwise rather arid region. The locally accepted spelling of the name in Tibetan script is zangs-dkar.

Some of the religious scholars of the district, also cited by Snellgrove and Skorupsky (1980) and Crook (1994), hold that it was originally "bzang-dkar", meaning good (or beautiful) and white. "Good" would refer to the triangular shape of the Padum plain, the triangle being the symbol of Dharma and religion; "white" would refer to the simplicity, goodness, and religious inclinations of the native population.

== History ==
The first traces of human activity in Zanskar seem to go back as far as the Bronze Age. Petroglyphs attributed to that period suggest that their creators were hunters on the steppes of central Asia, living between Kazakhstan and China. It is suggested that an Indo-European population known as the Mon might then have lived in this region, before mixing with or being replaced by the next settlers, the Dards. Early Buddhism coming from Kashmir spread its influence in Zanskar, possibly as early as 200 BC. The earliest monuments date from the Kushan period. After this eastward propagation of Buddhism, Zanskar and large parts of the Western Himalaya were overrun in the 7th century by the Tibetans, who imposed their then animistic Bön religion.

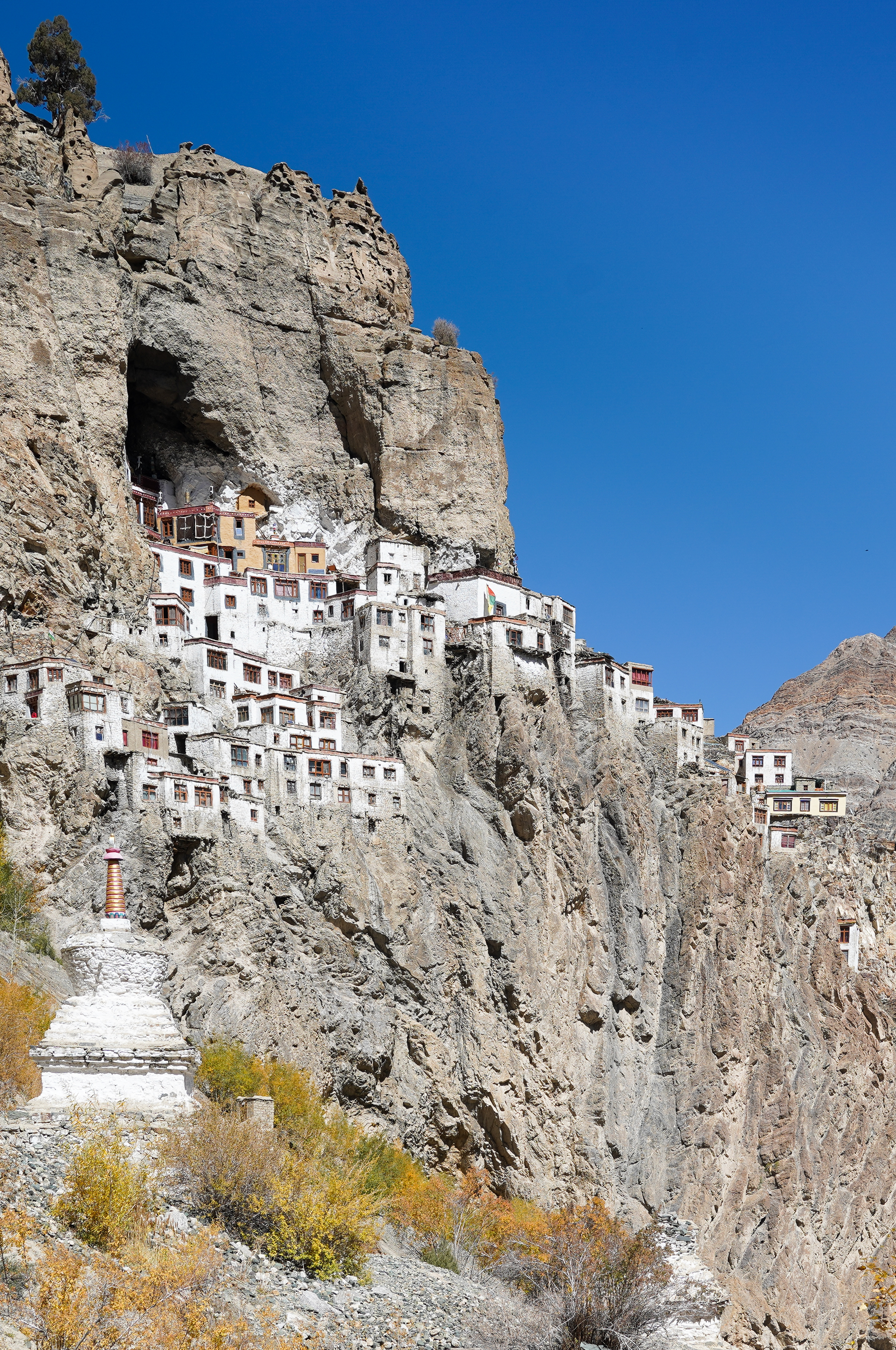
The Phugtal Monastery in south-east Zanskar

Buddhism regained its influence over Zanskar in the 8th century when Tibet was also converted to this religion. Between the 10th and 11th centuries, two Royal Houses were founded in Zanskar, and the monasteries of Karsha and Phugtal (see picture) were built. Until the 15th century Zanskar existed as a more or less independent Buddhist Kingdom ruled by two to four related royal families. In the early 17th century, Zanskar was conquered by Sengge Namgyal and was incorporated into Ladakh. In 1822 a coalition of Kulu, Lahaul, and Kinnaur invaded Zanskar, plundering the country and destroying the royal palace at Padum.

One of the first Tibetologists to spend an extended period in the region was Hungarian scholar Sándor Csoma de Kőrös who spent over a year living in the region in 1823.

After being integrated into the newly formed state of India in 1947, Zanskar and the neighbouring region of Ladakh were both declared restricted areas closed to foreigners, due to border conflicts between India, Pakistan, and China. Zanskar was opened to foreigners in 1974. In 1979 the first road in Zanskar was built to connect Padum with the main road from Srinagar into Ladakh. The opening of the road and the massive influx of tourists and researchers have brought many changes to the traditional social organisation of Zanskar.

In 2007 the valley suffered its third year of a desert locust infestation with many villages losing their crops. The response of the monasteries puja (prayer) to get rid of them, while the government advocated insecticides, which the Buddhists were reluctant to use, but in some cases were forced to try, with as yet undocumented success. In 2008 it was reported that the locusts had left the central Zanskar plains.

=== Formation of new district ===
People of Zanskar demanded having their own district, separate from the existing Kargil district, for more than 70 years.The Ladakh Buddhist Association also demanded the creation of a Zanskar district. In August 2024, the Ministry of Home Affairs announced that Zanskar will become a district in Ladakh. On 27 April 2026, Zanskar became a new district, with headquarters at Padum.

== Geography ==
=== Topography ===
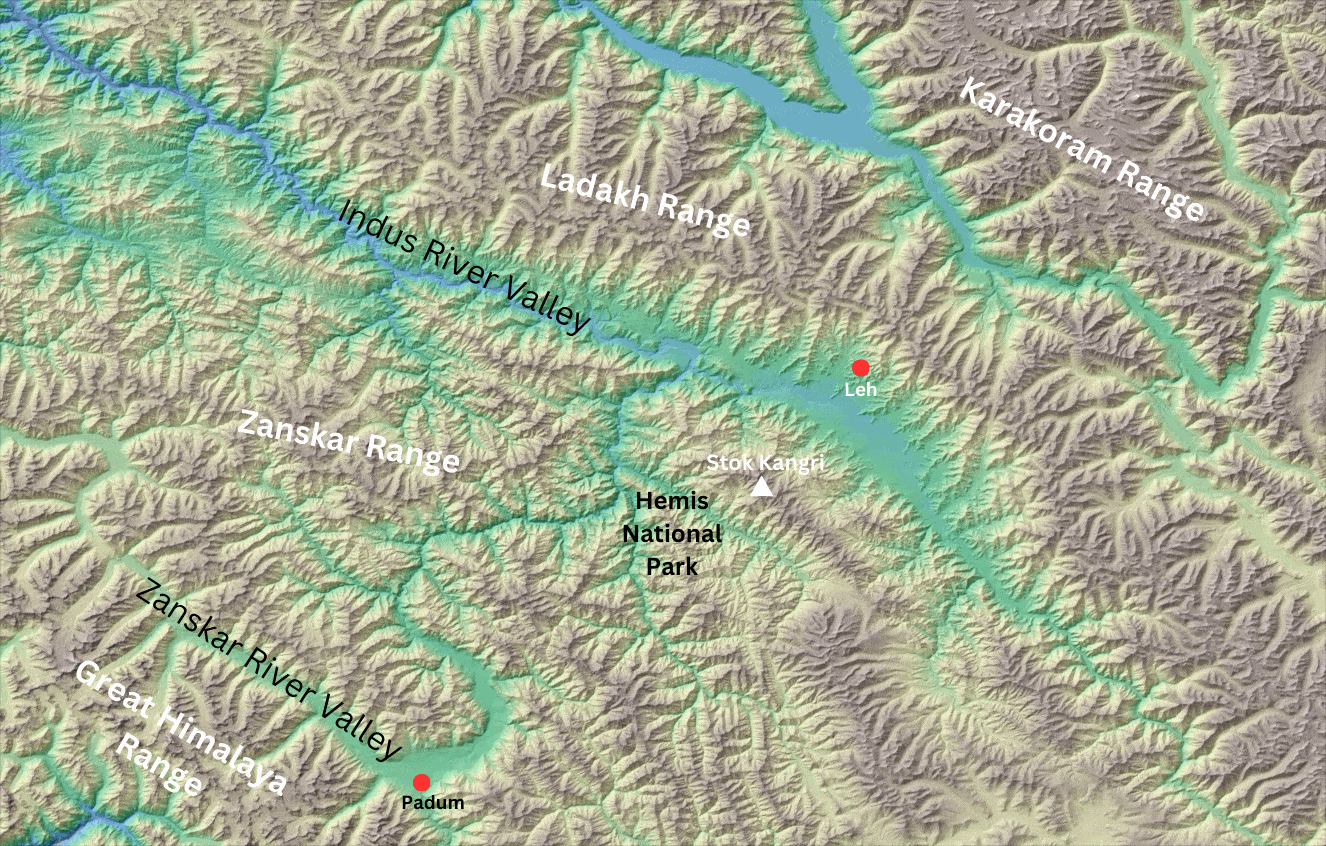
Topographic map of Zanskar region

Zanskar covers an area of some 6,688 square kilometres (2,582 sq mi), generally at an elevation between 3,600 and 4,000 m (11,800 and 13,100 ft). It consists of the country lying along the two main branches of the Zanskar River. The first, the Doda River, has its source near the Pensi La 4,400 metres (14,400 ft) mountain-pass, and then flows south-eastwards along the main valley leading towards Padum, the capital of Zanskar.

The second branch is formed by two main tributaries known as Kargyag river (also known as Kurgiakh river), with its source near the Shinku La 5,091 metres (16,703 ft), and Tsarap River, with its source near the Baralacha-La. These two rivers unite below the village of Purney to form the Lungnak river (also known as the Lingti or Tsarap river). The Lungnak river then flows north-westwards along a narrow gorge towards Zanskar's central valley (known locally as jung-khor), where it unites with the Doda river to form the Zanskar river.

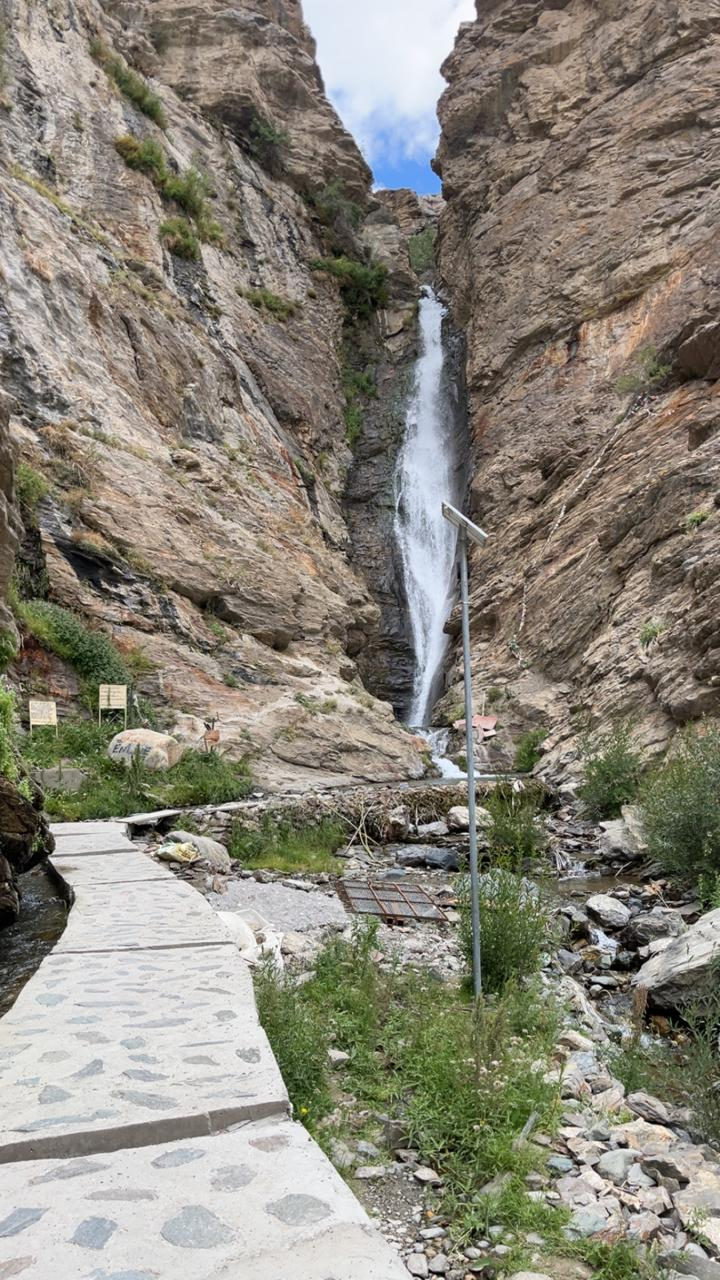
Sheela waterfall, eventually feeding the Tsarap River

The Zanskar river then takes a north-eastern course until it joins the Indus in Ladakh. High mountain ridges lie on both sides of the Doda and Lingti–kargyag valleys, which run north-west to south-east. To the south-west is the Great Himalayan Range which separates Zanskar from the Kisthwar and Chamba basins. To the north-east lies the Zanskar Range, which separates Zanskar from Ladakh. The only outlet for the whole Zanskar hydrographic system is thus the Zanskar river, which cuts the deep and narrow Zanskar Gorge through the Zanskar range.

These topographical features explain why access to Zanskar is difficult from all sides. Communication with the neighbouring Himalayan areas is maintained across mountain passes or along the Zanskar river when frozen. The easiest approach leads from Kargil through the Suru valley and over the Penzi-La.

=== Climate ===
Zanskar is a high altitude semi-desert lying on the northern flank of the Himalayan Range. This mountain range acts as a barrier protecting Ladakh and Zanskar from most of the monsoon, resulting in a pleasantly warm and dry climate in the summer. Rain and snowfall during this period are scarce, although recent decades have shown a trend towards increasing precipitation. Several water-driven mills were built during ancient periods of drought at a great distance from the villages, but have been abandoned because running water is now available nearer to the settlements. Zanskari houses, though otherwise well built, are not adapted to the recently increasing rainfall, as their roofs leak, catching their surprised inhabitants unprepared. Most of the precipitation occurs as snowfall during the harsh and extremely long winter period. These winter snowfalls are of vital importance, since they feed the glaciers which melt in the summer and provide most of the irrigation water.

Climate data for Padum
Month	Jan	Feb	Mar	Apr	May	Jun	Jul	Aug	Sep	Oct	Nov	Dec	Year
Mean daily maximum °C (°F)	−16.5 (2.3)	−14.3 (6.3)	−10.4 (13.3)	−4.9 (23.2)	0.2 (32.4)	6.7 (44.1)	13.0 (55.4)	13.3 (55.9)	9.1 (48.4)	1.4 (34.5)	−7.0 (19.4)	−13.8 (7.2)	−1.9 (28.5)
Daily mean °C (°F)	−20.6 (−5.1)	−18.0 (−0.4)	−15.1 (4.8)	−10.1 (13.8)	−4.7 (23.5)	1.6 (34.9)	7.6 (45.7)	7.8 (46.0)	3.3 (37.9)	−4.6 (23.7)	−12.7 (9.1)	−18.9 (−2.0)	−7.0 (19.3)
Mean daily minimum °C (°F)	−26.0 (−14.8)	−23.1 (−9.6)	−21.4 (−6.5)	−16.8 (1.8)	−11.6 (11.1)	−5.3 (22.5)	1.3 (34.3)	1.6 (34.9)	−3.7 (25.3)	−11.9 (10.6)	−19.6 (−3.3)	−25.4 (−13.7)	−13.5 (7.7)
Average precipitation mm (inches)	58 (2.3)	74 (2.9)	70 (2.8)	49 (1.9)	26 (1.0)	28 (1.1)	53 (2.1)	57 (2.2)	27 (1.1)	12 (0.5)	22 (0.9)	36 (1.4)	512 (20.2)
Average rainy days	8	9	8	7	4	5	9	9	4	2	3	5	73
Average relative humidity (%) (daily average)	64	67	69	74	76	72	65	63	56	50	55	63	65
Mean daily sunshine hours	5.0	5.1	6.8	7.8	8.6	8.7	8.0	7.4	7.8	7.9	6.9	5.8	7.2
Source: climate-data.org, 1991-2021 weather averages

== Administration ==
Sub-divisions, Development Blocks, Tehsils and Villages in Zanskar district
Current district	Sub-division	Tehsil	Development Blocks	Villages
Zanskar district	Zanskar	Padum	Padum	Padum, Karsha, Uptipipiting, Rukruk, Salapi Gyapak, Techakhasar, Langmi Riging, Sani
Zanskar district	Zanskar	Phey	Phey	Phey, Rangdum, Ramilskyagam, Hemiling, Abran, Aksho, Ating, Tungri, Rantaksha
Zanskar district	Zanskar	Zangla	Zangla	Zangla, Thungday Khumi
Zanskar district	Zanskar	Lungnak	Lungnak	Pipcha, Raru Muney, Icher
Zanskar district	Zanskar	Chah	Chah	Chah, Testa, Kargyak, Shunshday
Total	1	5	5	26

== Demographics ==
Zanskar's population is small, the 2011 census recorded a population of 13,793 people. The sex ratio was 862 females per 1,000 males. The literacy rate was 59.73%. The majority of Zanskaris are of mixed Tibetan and Indo-European origins; notably Changpa, Dard and Mon. The latter are ethnically Dard, but "Mon" is used in order to distinguish them from later Dard settlers. A small fraction are Sunni Muslims whose ancestors settled in Padum and its environs in the 19th century.

=== Religion ===
Religion in Zanskar (2011)
Religion	Percent(%)
Buddhism	93.91%
Islam	5.53%
Hinduism	0.17%
Other or not stated	0.39%

An overwhelming majority of Zanskar is Buddhist. Almost every village has a local monastery, often containing ancient wall-paintings and images. There are two main branches of Tibetan Buddhism here — the Drugpa, including Sani Monastery, Dzongkhul, Stagrimo and Bardan Monastery — all loosely affiliated with Stakna in the Indus Valley. The Gelugpa control Rangdum Monastery, Karsha, Stongde and Phugtal Monastery, which all pay allegiance to the Ngari Rinpoche, who has his main seat at Likir Monastery in Ladakh. The present emanation of the Ngari Rinpoche is the younger brother of the Dalai Lama.

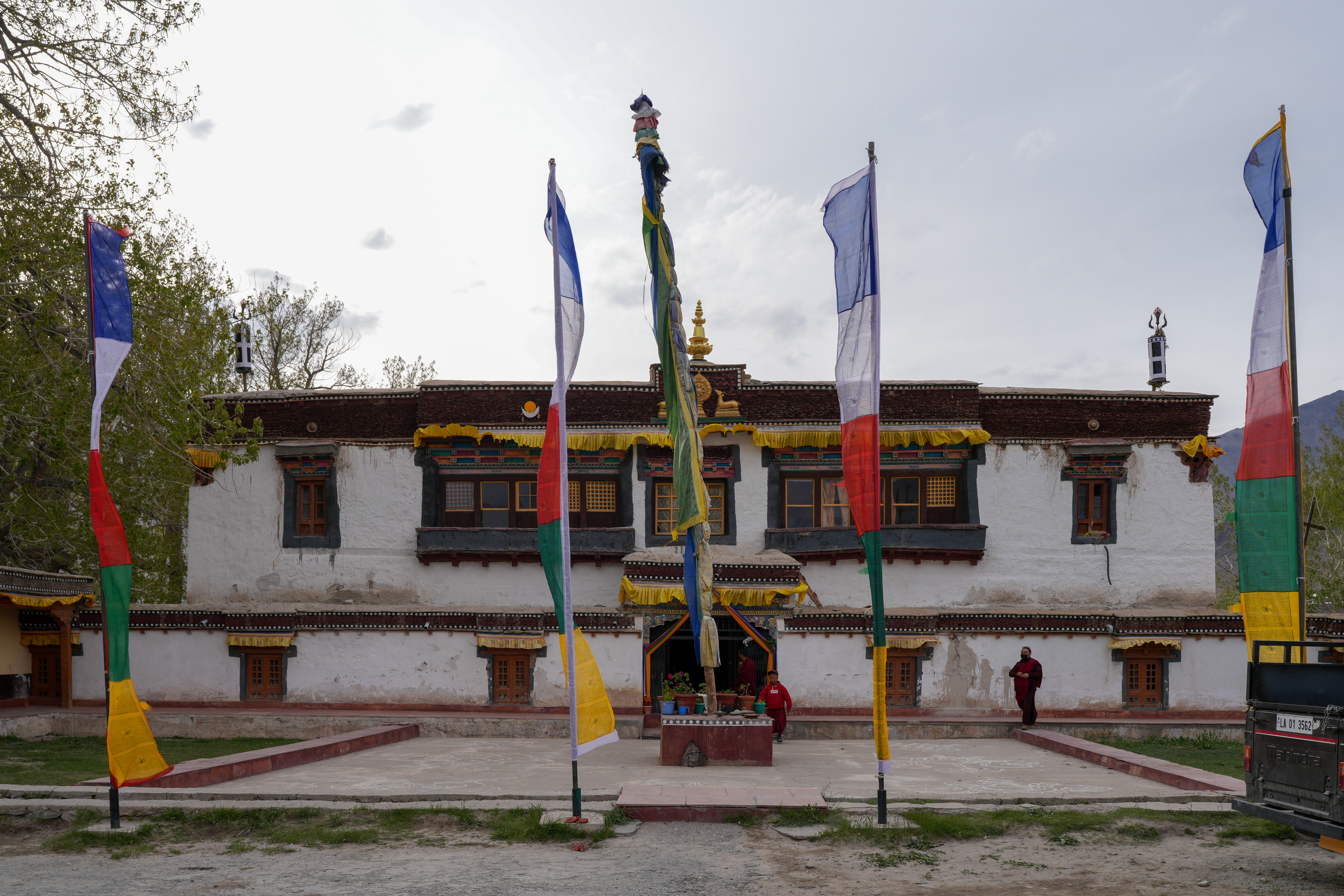
Sani Monastery, considered to be the oldest religious site in Ladakh.

=== Language ===
99.4% of people living in Zanskar speak Zanskari language of the Ladakhi-Balti language group. It is written using the Tibetan script. Monks who have studied outside of Zanskar may know Standard Tibetan. Educated people of Zanskar know English as it is a compulsory subject in numerous Indian schools.The population lives mainly in scattered small villages, the largest being the capital Padum, with nearly 700 inhabitants. Most of the villages are located in the valleys of the Zanskar River and its two main tributaries. Given the isolation of this region, the inhabitants tend towards self-sufficiency, and until recently lived in almost complete autarky. External trade has, however, always been necessary for the acquisition of goods such as tools, jewellery, or religious artefacts.

== Politics ==
=== Parliamentary Constituency ===
The district falls under Ladakh Lok Sabha constituency. The present Member of Parliament (MP) of Ladakh is Mohmad Haneefa (independent candidate).

=== Autonomous Hill Council ===
Zanskar District is administered by an elected body known as the Ladakh Autonomous Hill Development Council, Zanskar. The LAHDC was established in 2026.

== Flora and fauna ==
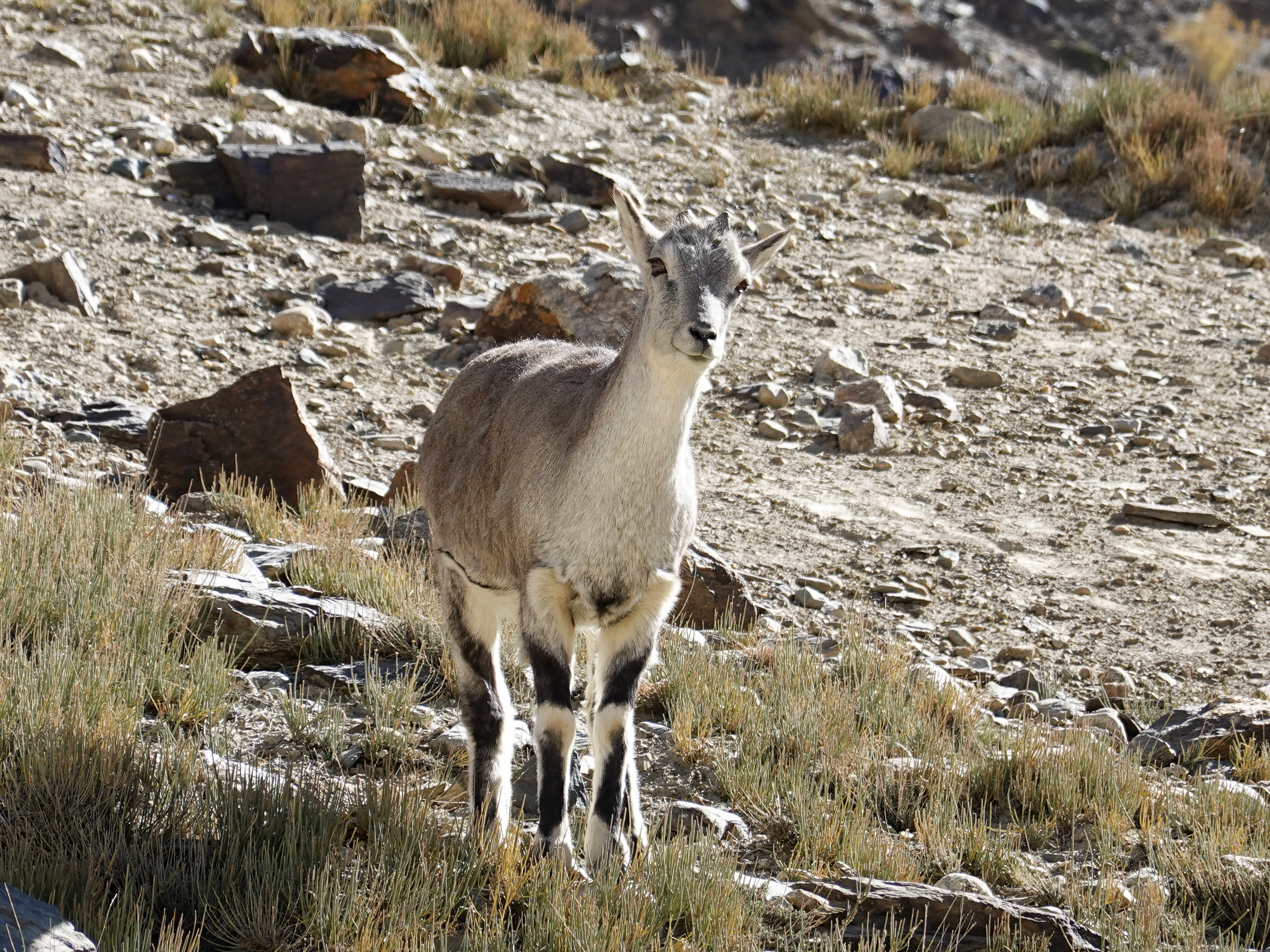
Gray goral (female)

Much of Zanskar's vegetation is found in the irrigated villages, and on the upper slopes, which receive more precipitation and grow alpine and tundra species. Most impressive are the meadows covered with thousands of edelweiss. At the foot of the Gumburanjon mountain, blue poppies can be found. Crops including barley, lentils, and potatoes are grown by farmers at the lower elevations. Domesticated animals such as the yak, dzo, sheep, horse, and dog are found in the region.

Among the wildlife found in Zanskar are the marmot, bear, Himalayan wolf, snow leopard, bharal, alpine ibex, gray goral, and lammergeier.

== Economy ==
=== Agriculture ===
The Zanskaris' main occupations are cattle-rearing and farming of land that they almost always own. Cultivable land is scarce, and restricted to alluvial fans and terraces, cultivated fields being rarely found above an altitude of 4,000 metres. The Zanskaris have developed a system of intensive arable agriculture and complex irrigation to produce enough food in these conditions. As of 2016, the Zanskar lowlands support 20,000 sheep, 5,000 goats, 15,000 cattle and 3,500 horses.

The scarcity of cultivable land has also resulted in a tendency towards a stable, zero-growth population. An efficient birth-control system in Zanskar has historically been achieved by the common practice of polyandrous marriage, in which several brothers are married to the same wife, and the widespread adoption of a celibate religious life. A high infant mortality rate also contributes to population stability.

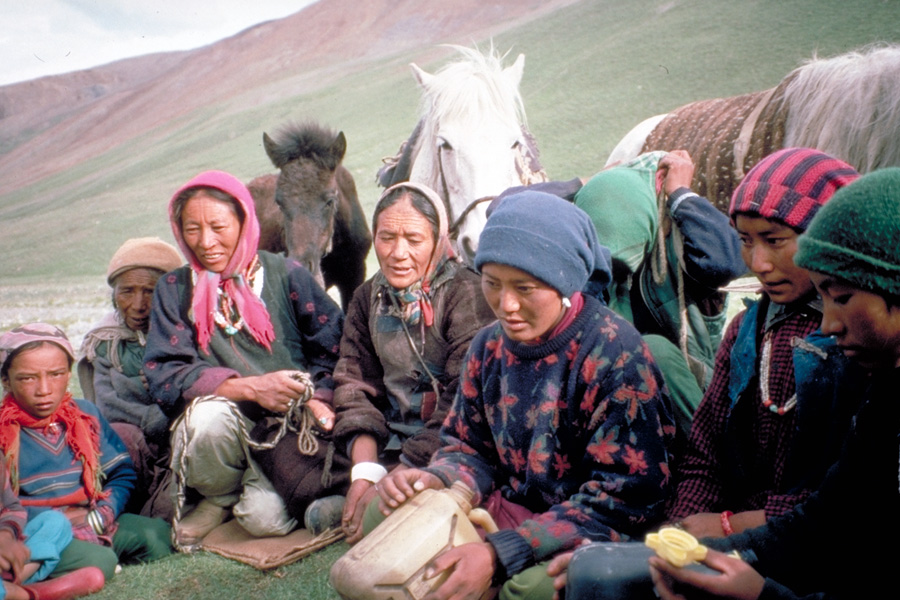
Group of Zanskari women and children.

Zanskar has a system of high-altitude transhumance, known as doksa, where livestock are tended by women at higher elevations during the summer. This system is similar to livestock grazing in the European Alps. The livestock is pooled between multiple households and drive to high elevation pastures near the glaciers.

=== Tourism ===
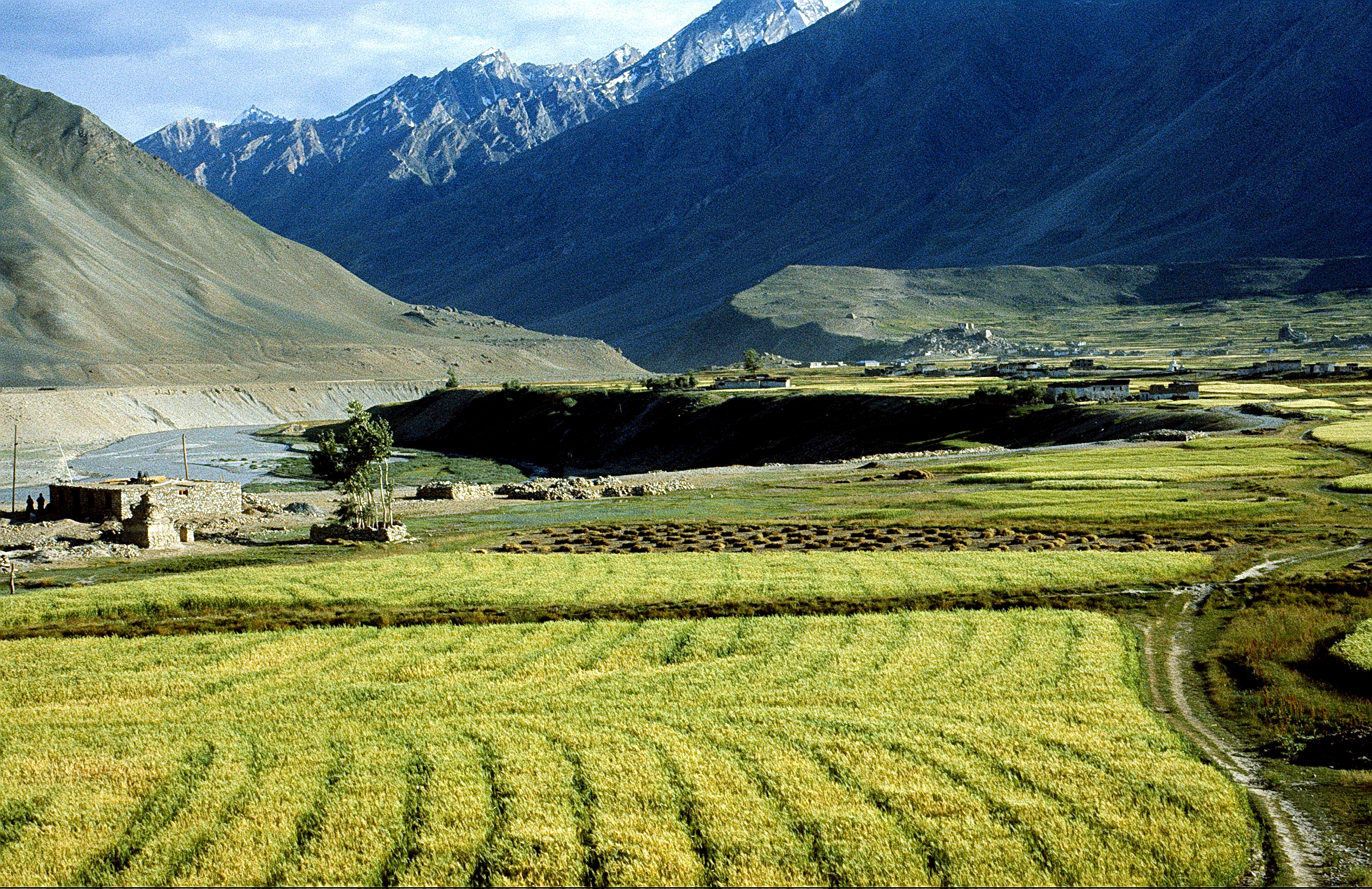
Padum from Pibiting village in the north.

Tourism is probably the major disruption that Zanskar has experienced during recent times. The opening of this region to foreigners has brought changes such as the financing of schools and the restoration of monasteries and roads, but has also taken its toll on the fragile mountain environment and its population.

A number of notable Buddhist monasteries are located near Padum, including Bardan Monastery and Karsha Monastery and the newly built Dalai Lama Photang. The Phugtal Monastery is accessible from here. It is a day's trek from Dorzang, the end of the road leading from Padum. Chadar trek passes through Padum.

Padum has several hotels, homestays and restaurants for tourists.

=== Transport ===
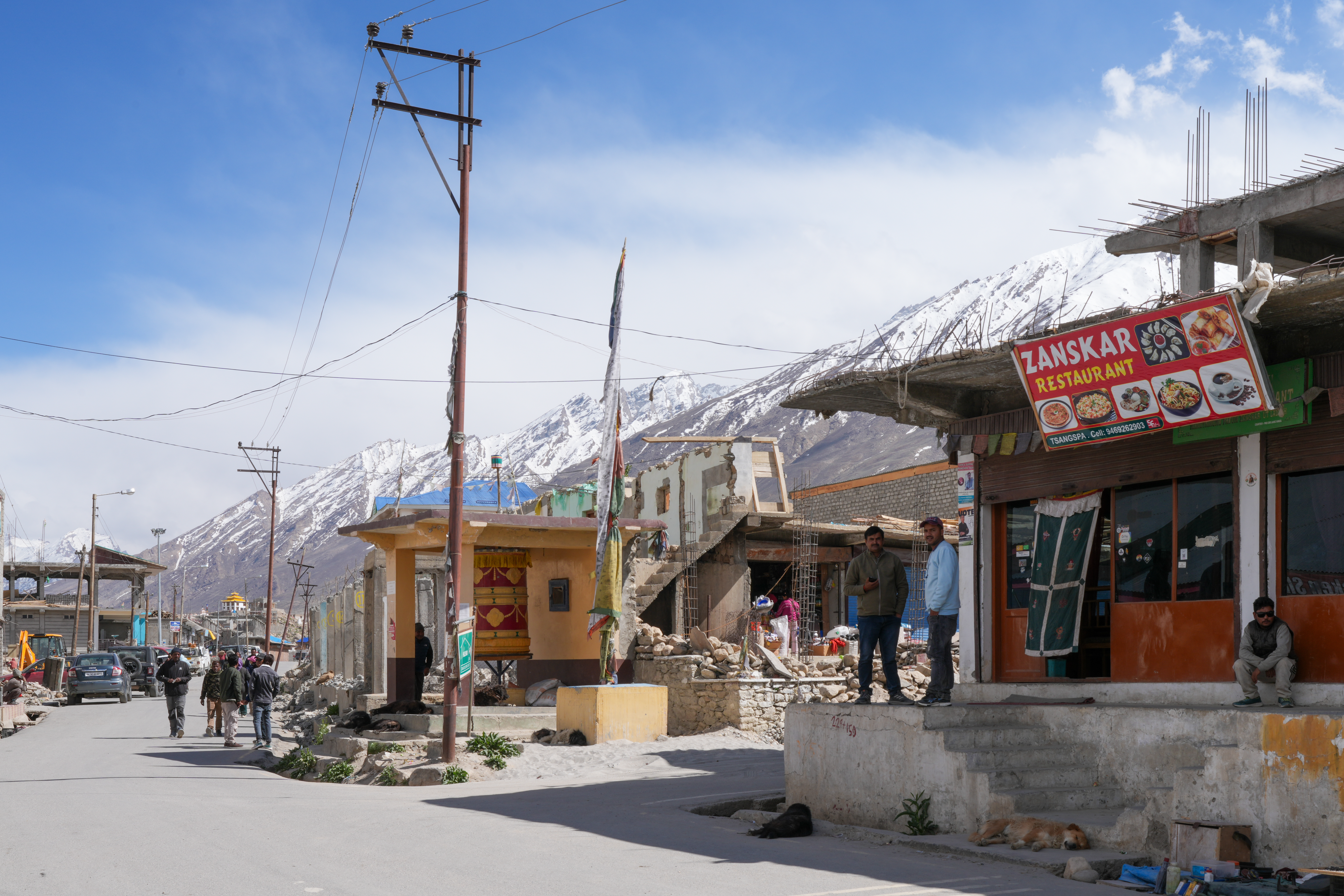
Padum market, Padum-Darcha road.

The nearest airports to Zanskar are Kushok Bakula Rimpochee Airport at Leh and Kargil Airport. The nearest railway station is Jammu Tawi railway station, 750 km to the south.

The Nimmu–Padum–Darcha road (NPD Road) connects Padum directly to Leh in the east and to Darcha (on NH3 Leh-Manali Highway) in Himachal Pradesh. The 235 km (146 mi) long 2-lane NH301 Padum-Pensi La-Kargil Highway connects Padum to Kargil city (on NH1). A road (now NH301) was constructed in 1980 from NH1 at Kargil over Pensi La, which is 235 km away. The 145 km road to Darcha passing through Shinkula pass is now operational, connecting to the Manali-Leh Highway. A bus operates between 1 June and 30 September, after which the Manali–Leh (NH21) highway is normally closed. Other roads, including the NH1 highway from Leh to Srinagar via Kargil, remain open until the end of October.

== In popular culture ==
The first colour film of life in Zanskar was shot in 1958 by an expedition of three British housewives.

The 2001 movie Samsara was entirely shot in Zanskar. In 2010, the American film director Frederick Marx made a documentary called "Journey from Zanskar". Narrated by Richard Gere, the film tells the story of two monks helping 17 poor children reaching Tibetan schools in India through a difficult and dangerous terrain.

== See also ==
- List of districts of Ladakh
- Geography of Ladakh
- Tourism in Ladakh
- Pensi La
- Shingo La

== Bibliography ==
- Boyden, Mark (2013). Travels In Zanskar: A Journey to a Closed Kingdom. Dublin: The Liffey Press. ISBN 978-1-908308-51-1.
- Conover, Ted (2010). The Routes of Man: How Roads Are Changing the World and the Way We Live Today. New York: Alfred A. Knopf. pp. 71–112. ISBN 978-1-4000-4244-9.
- Crook, John; Osmaston, Henry (1994). Himalayan Buddhist Villages: Environment, Resources, Society and Religious Life in Zangskar, Ladakh. Bristol: University of Bristol UK. p. 866. ISBN 0-86292-386-7.
- Crowden, James (2020). The Frozen River: Seeking Silence in the Himalaya. William Collins. ISBN 978-0008353179.
- Deboos, Salomé (2010). Être musulman au Zanskar: Himalaya indien. Editions Universitaires Européenne. ISBN 978-613-1-52976-4.
- Dèzes, Pierre (1999). "Tectonic and metamorphic Evolution of the Central Himalayan Domain in Southeast Zanskar (Kashmir, India)". Mémoires de Géologie. Doctoral thesis. 32. Universite de Lausanne: 149. ISSN 1015-3578. Archived from the original on 31 October 2016.
- Gutschow, Kim (2004). Being a Buddhist Nun: The Struggle for Enlightenment in the Indian Himalayas. Harvard University Press.
- Namgail, T. (2004). "Zangskar: mystic land". Sanctuary Asia. 24: 44–47. Archived from the original on 13 November 2021.
- Noble, Christina (1991). At Home in the Himalayas. London: Fontana. ISBN 0-00-637499-9.
- Rizvi, Janet (1998). Ladakh, Crossroads of High Asia. Oxford University Press. ISBN 0-19-564546-4.
- Schettler, Margaret; Schettler, Rolf (1981). Kashmir, Ladakh & Zanskar. South Yarra, Victoria, Australia: Lonely Planet Publications. ISBN 0-908086-21-0.
- Snellgrove, D.L.; Skorupsky, T. (1980). The Cultural Heritage of Ladakh. Warminster, Aris and Phillips. ISBN 0-85668-058-3.
- Tsering, Tobden (1985). Lamas of Zaṅs-dkar a collection of manuscript material about the lives of Kun-dgaʼ-chos-legs, Bla-ma Kar-ma, and Grub-dbaṅ Nag-dbaṅ-tshe-riṅ. Gemur, Distt. Lahul. Mkhas-grub-chen-po Dpal Bzad-pa-rdo-rje rnam thar mgur bum Ma rig mun sel dran pai klog phren.
