= Chatra =

Chatra or Chhatra may refer to:

== Places ==
=== India ===
- Chatra district, Jharkhand
  - Chatra, Jharkhand, the headquarters of Chatra district
  - Chatra Assembly constituency
  - Chatra Lok Sabha constituency
  - Chatra subdivision an administrative subdivision of North Chotanagpur division
    - Chatra (community development block)
- Chatra, Bankura, West Bengal
- Chatra, Serampore, West Bengal
- Chatra railway station, Birbhum district, West Bengal

=== Other countries ===
- Chatra, Bangladesh
- Chatra, Republic of Bashkortostan, Russia
- Chatra Gorge, a canyon of the Kosi River in Nepal

== People ==
- Chatra Shah (fl. c.1605–1606), King of the Gorkha Kingdom in present-day Nepal
- Chhatra Man Singh Gurung (born 1952), Nepali military officer
- Chhatra Manikya (died 1667), Maharaja of Tripura 1661–1667

== Other uses ==
- Chatra (moth), a genus in the family Lasiocampidae
- Chatra (umbrella), a symbol in Hinduism, Jainism, and Buddhism
- Choultry, or chathra, a resting place for pilgrims to Buddhist, Jain, and Hindu temples

== See also ==
- Chadar (disambiguation)
