= Chadar =

Chadar may refer to:

- an alternative spelling of chador, traditional Islamic female garment
- the Zanskar River in Ladakh, when frozen in winter months
  - Chadar trek, the trail over the frozen Zanskar River
  - Chadar Road, a section of the Nimmu–Padum–Darcha road that runs next to the Zanskar River

== See also ==
- Chatra (disambiguation)
