= Chatra (moth) =

Scientific classification
- Kingdom: Animalia
- Phylum: Arthropoda
- Class: Insecta
- Order: Lepidoptera
- Family: Lasiocampidae
- Genus: Chatra; Moore, 1879

Genus of moths

Chatra is a genus of moths in the family Lasiocampidae. The genus was erected by Frederic Moore in 1879.

The Global Lepidoptera Names Index gives this name as a synonym of Metanastria.

== Species ==
- Chatra grisea Moore, 1879

Catalogue of Life gives this name as a synonym of Kunugia latipennis.
