= Metanastria hyrtaca =

- Caterpillar in Sri Lanka

Scientific classification
- Kingdom: Animalia
- Phylum: Arthropoda
- Class: Insecta
- Order: Lepidoptera
- Family: Lasiocampidae
- Genus: Metanastria
- Species: M. hyrtaca

Binomial name
- Metanastria hyrtaca Cramer, 1782

Synonyms
- Phalaena hyrtaca Cramer, 1779; Bombyx lusca Fabricius, 1787; Lebeda repanda Walker, 1855; Metanastria laricis Hübner, 1789

Species of moth

Metanastria hyrtaca, called the hairy caterpillar as a larva, is a moth of the family Lasiocampidae first described by Pieter Cramer in 1782. It is found in Sri Lanka.

== Biology ==
The adult has a grayish head and thorax and a whitish abdomen. Forewings are brownish with a characteristic reddish-brown spot ringed with white. Hindwings are whitish. Larva yellowish brown with black spots and long lateral tufts of hairs. A reddish band is found in the neck region.

The caterpillar is a serious pest of many economically important crops such as cashew, badam, moringa, sapota, jamun, guava, Vachellia nilotica, Shorea robusta, Schima wallichii, Nyctanthes arbor-tristis, Mimusops elengi and Madhuca longifolia.
