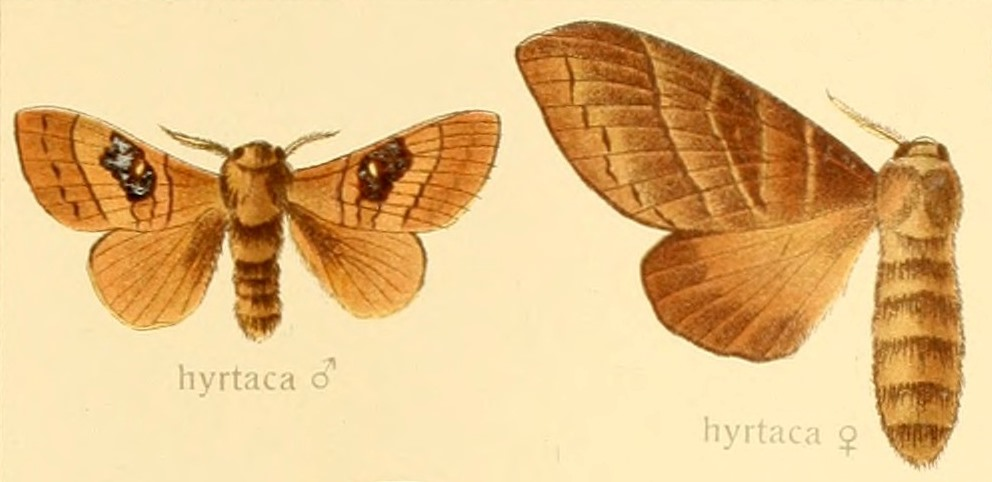
- Male and female Metanastria hyrtaca

Scientific classification
- Kingdom: Animalia
- Phylum: Arthropoda
- Clade: Pancrustacea
- Class: Insecta
- Order: Lepidoptera
- Family: Lasiocampidae
- Genus: Metanastria; Hübner, 1820

= Metanastria =

Genus of moths

Metanastria is a genus of moths in the family Lasiocampidae described by Jacob Hübner in 1820. The species of this genus are found in Europe, Japan, China, South Africa, throughout India, Sri Lanka, Myanmar, Java and Borneo.

== Description ==
Palpi long and broad. Antennae with the branches gradually decreasing to the apex in the male, which is short throughout in female. Mid and hind tibia have minute terminal spur pairs. Forewings are broad, where vein 1c present, veins 6, 7, 8 or 6 and 7 only stalked. Stalk of veins 9 and 10 are long. Hindwings with veins 4 and 5 stalked or from cell. Vein 8 is almost touching vein 7. There are slight accessory costal veinlets.

== Species ==
- Metanastria aconyta Cramer, 1777
- Metanastria albisparsa Wileman, 1910
- Metanastria asteria
- Metanastria capucina
- Metanastria gemella De Lajonquière, 1979
- Metanastria hyrtaca Cramer, 1782
- Metanastria jani Zolotuhin, Treadaway & Witt, 1998
- Metanastria lajonquierei
- Metanastria marmorata Zolotuhin, Treadaway & Witt, 1998
- Metanastria minor
- Metanastria pika
- Metanastria protracta Herrich-Schäffer, 1856
- Metanastria subpurpurea Butler, 1881
- Metanastria trefa Zolotuhin, Treadaway & Witt, 1998
