= Nimmu–Padum–Darcha road =

Road in India

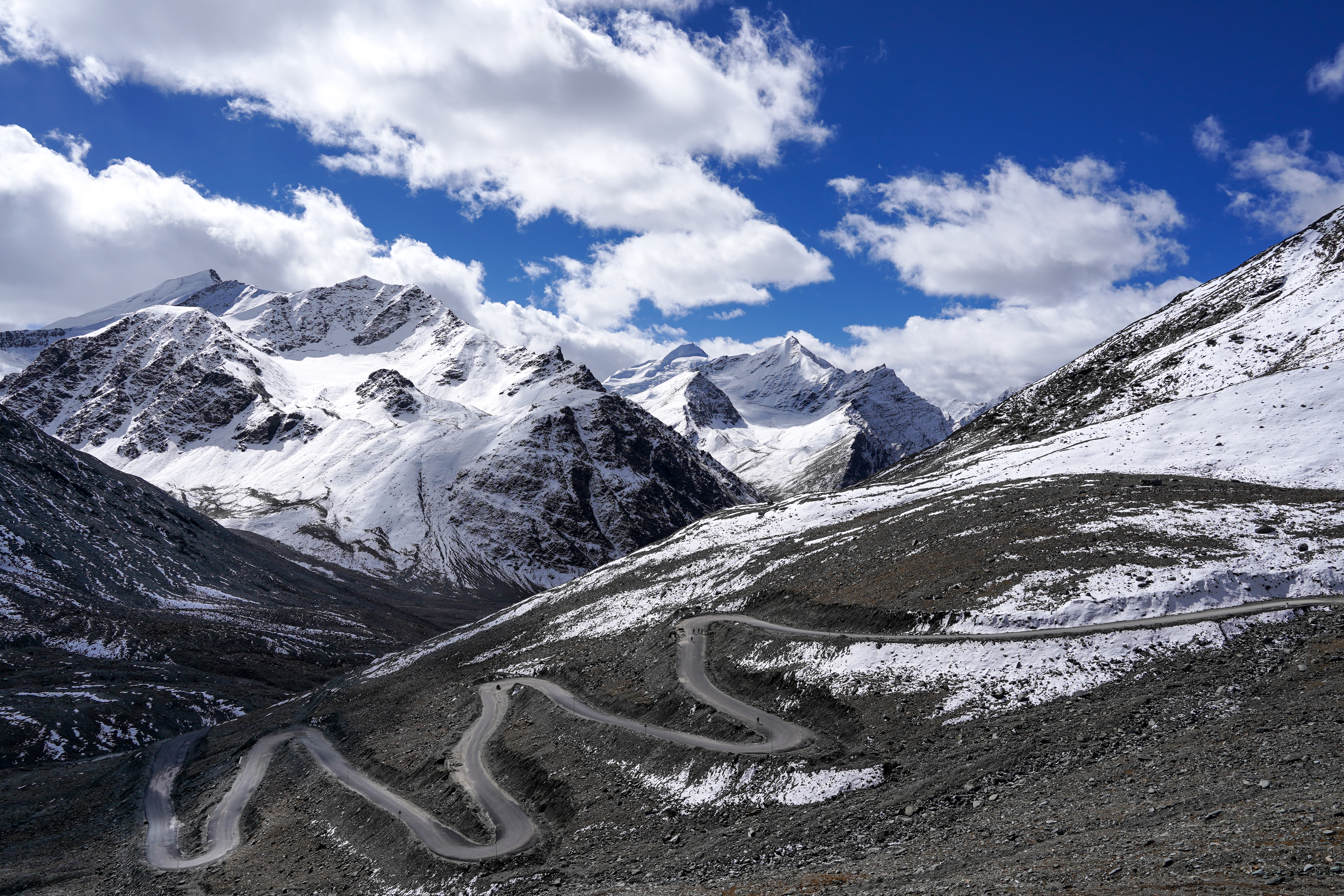
- Darcha-Padum road winding up to Shingo La, elev. 4,975m (16,322 ft)

Major junctions
- North end: Nimmu, Ladakh
- South end: Darcha, Himachal Pradesh

Location
- Country: India
- States: Ladakh, Himachal Pradesh
- Primary destinations: Nimmu, Ladakh; Padum, Ladakh; Darcha, Lahaul & Spiti, Himachal Pradesh

Highway system
- Roads in India; Expressways; National; State; Asian

Nimmu–Padum–Darcha road (NPD road) or Zanskar Highway is a modern 2-lane 298 km long paved road between the Indian union territory of Ladakh and the state of Himachal Pradesh, passing through the region of Zanskar, which will become all-weather road once the under-construction Shunku La Tunnel is completed in 2028–29. It connects Nimmu in the Indus Valley to Padum, the capital of Zanskar, and to Darcha village in Lahul and Spiti. It provides an alternative to the Leh–Manali Highway in linking Ladakh with the rest of India. It was built by the Border Roads Organisation (BRO) of the Indian Army. The construction of road was completed in March 2024. The already completed Atal tunnel, and the under-construction unidirectional-twin-tube 4-lane Shingo La Tunnel, which is expected to be completed by 2027 will provide all weather connectivity and reduce the distance from Manali to Kargil by 522 km.

It is estimated that travel on this road will only take 10–12 hours to reach Leh from Manali, as opposed to the Leh-Manali highway taking almost 14–16 hours under good weather conditions. The road is strategic for the Indian Army as it is set back from the international border and can facilitate safe troop movements. The Nimmu-Padam Darcha road is just 298 km from Darcha in Himachal Pradesh.

== History ==
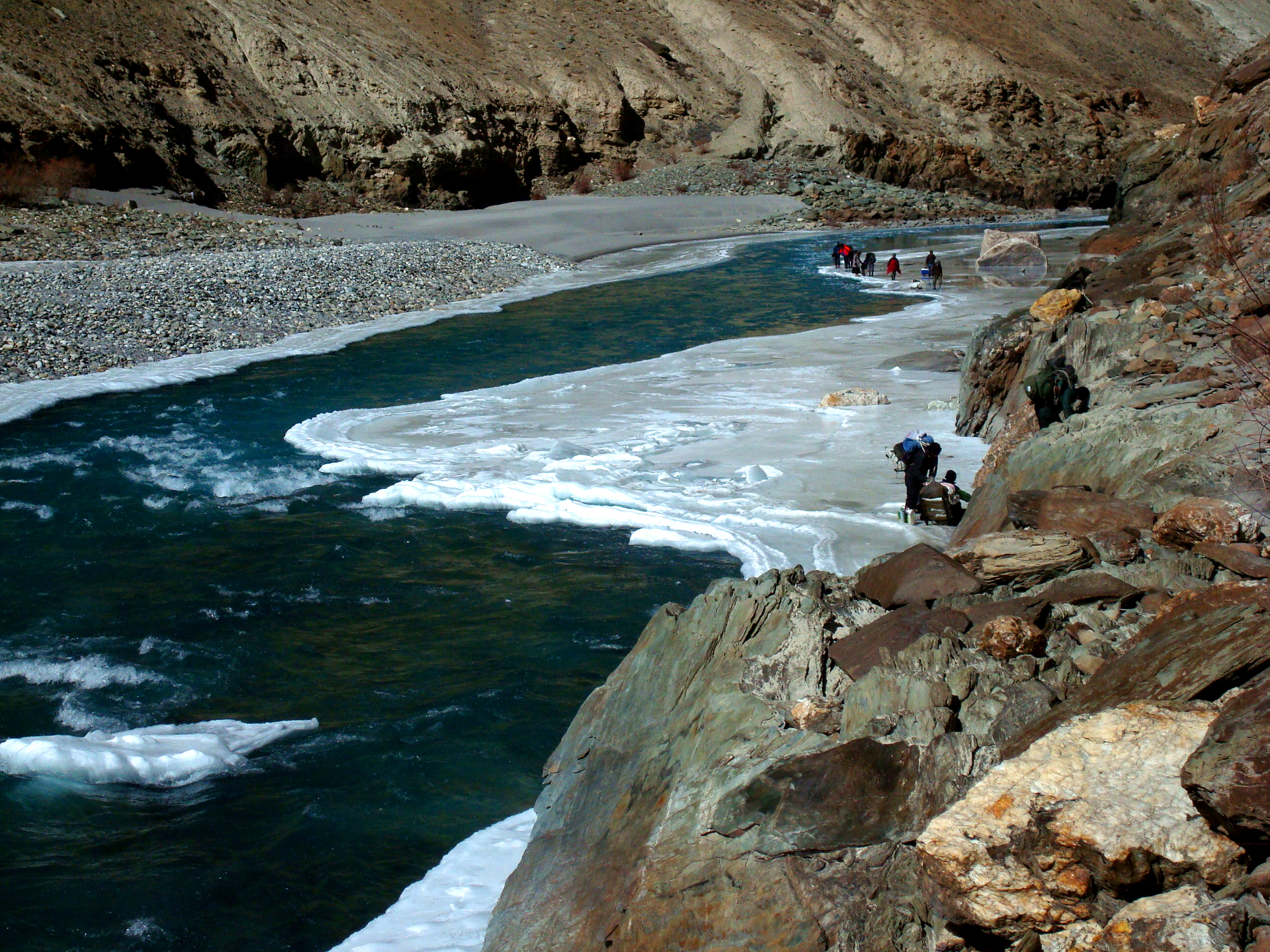
Frozen Zanskar River (called "Chadar") was used for travelling between Padum and Leh.

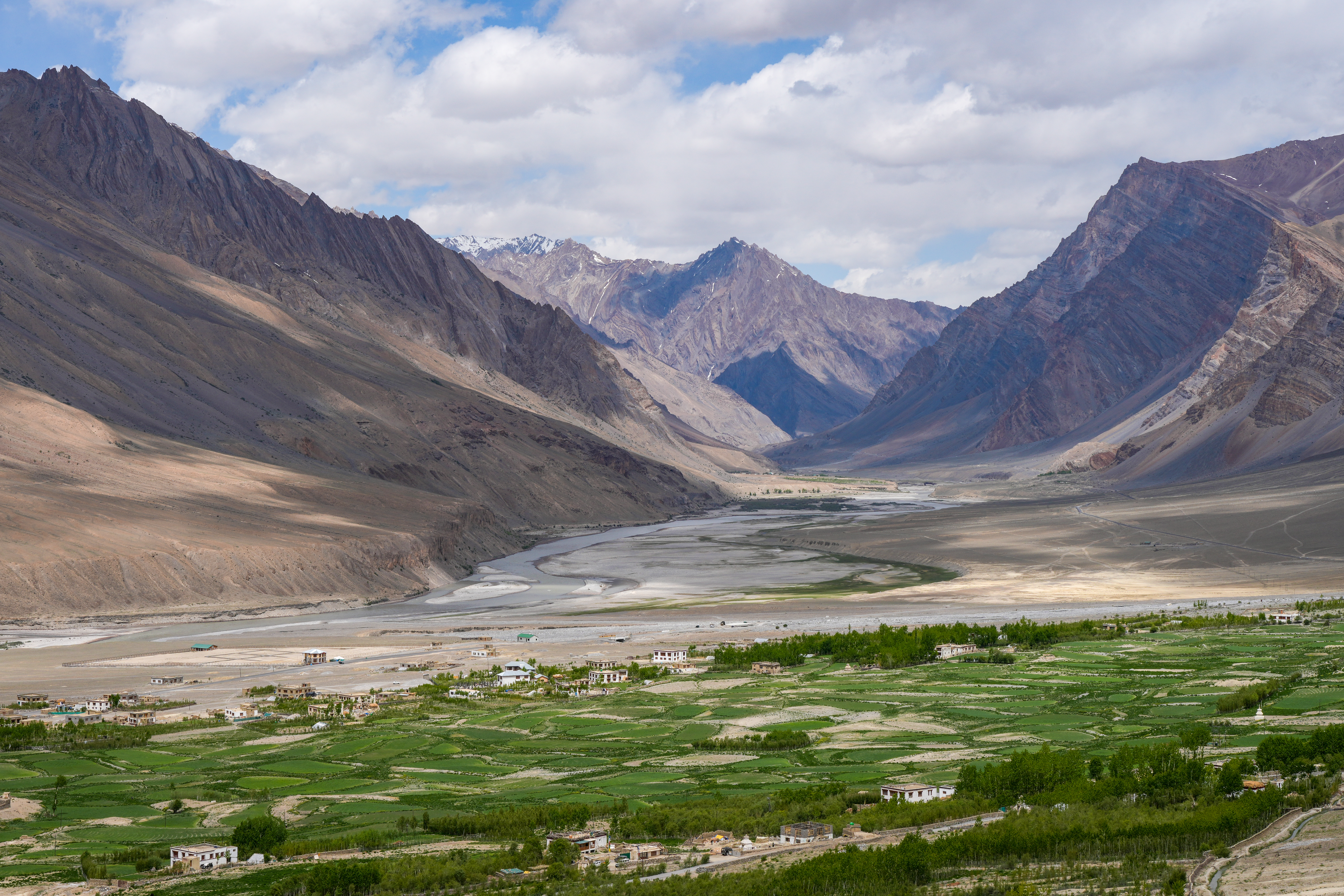
Nimmu-Padum road enters the valley at centre, runs along the Zanskar past Zangla in the foreground.

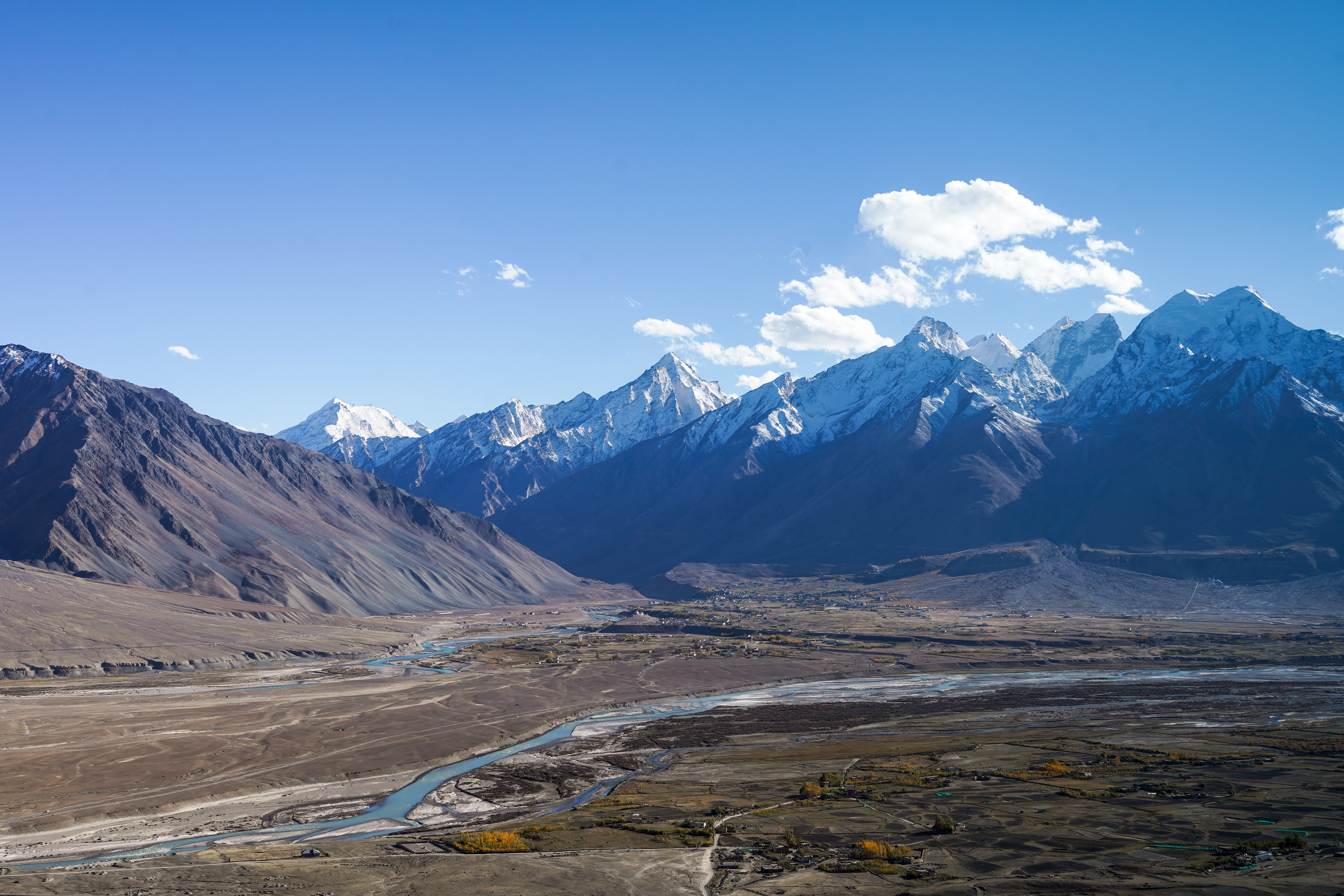
Padum nestled beneath the Zanskar Range. Road from Nimmu lower left, road to Darcha centre left, Oct 2022.

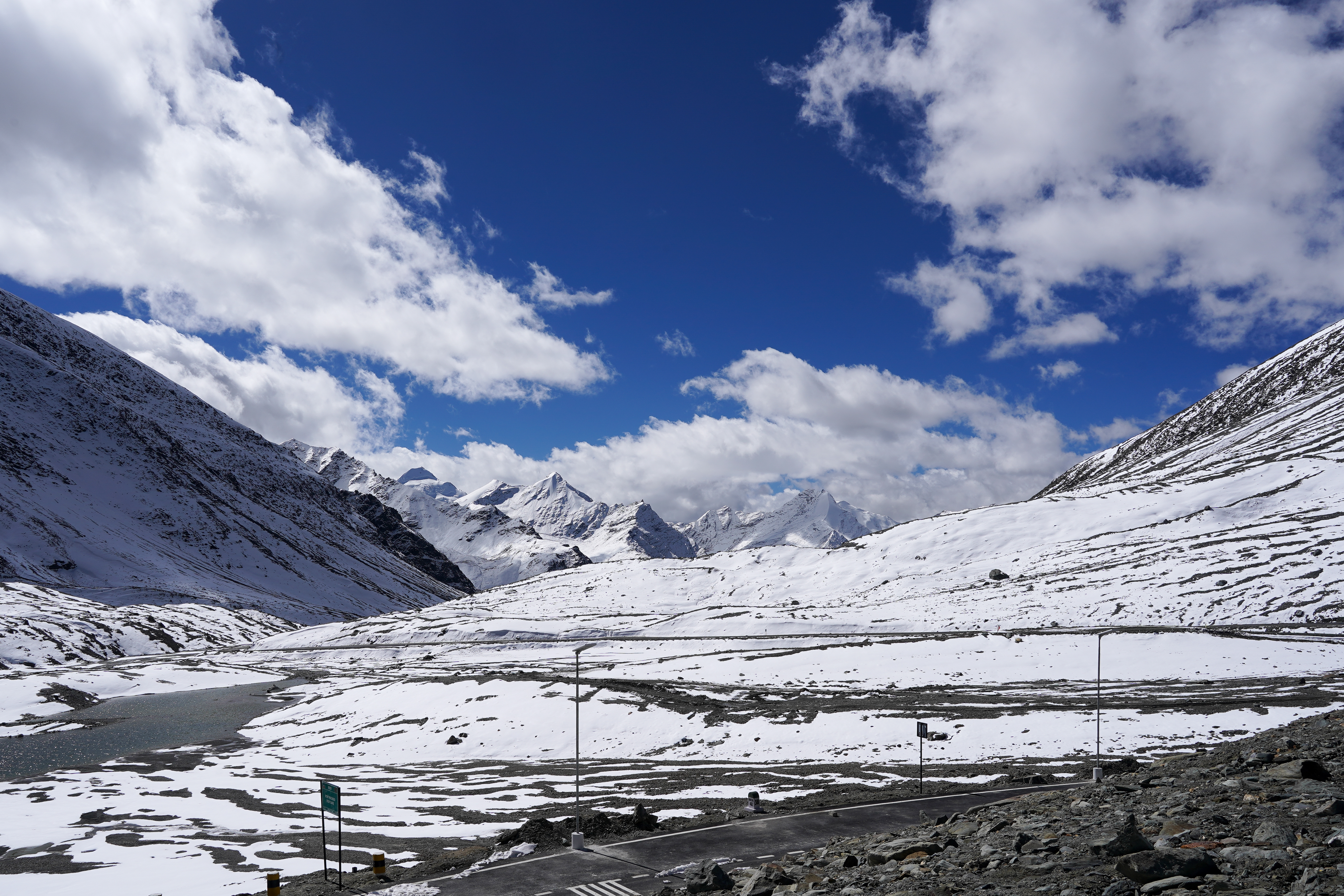
Shingo La, view towards Darcha, Oct 2022

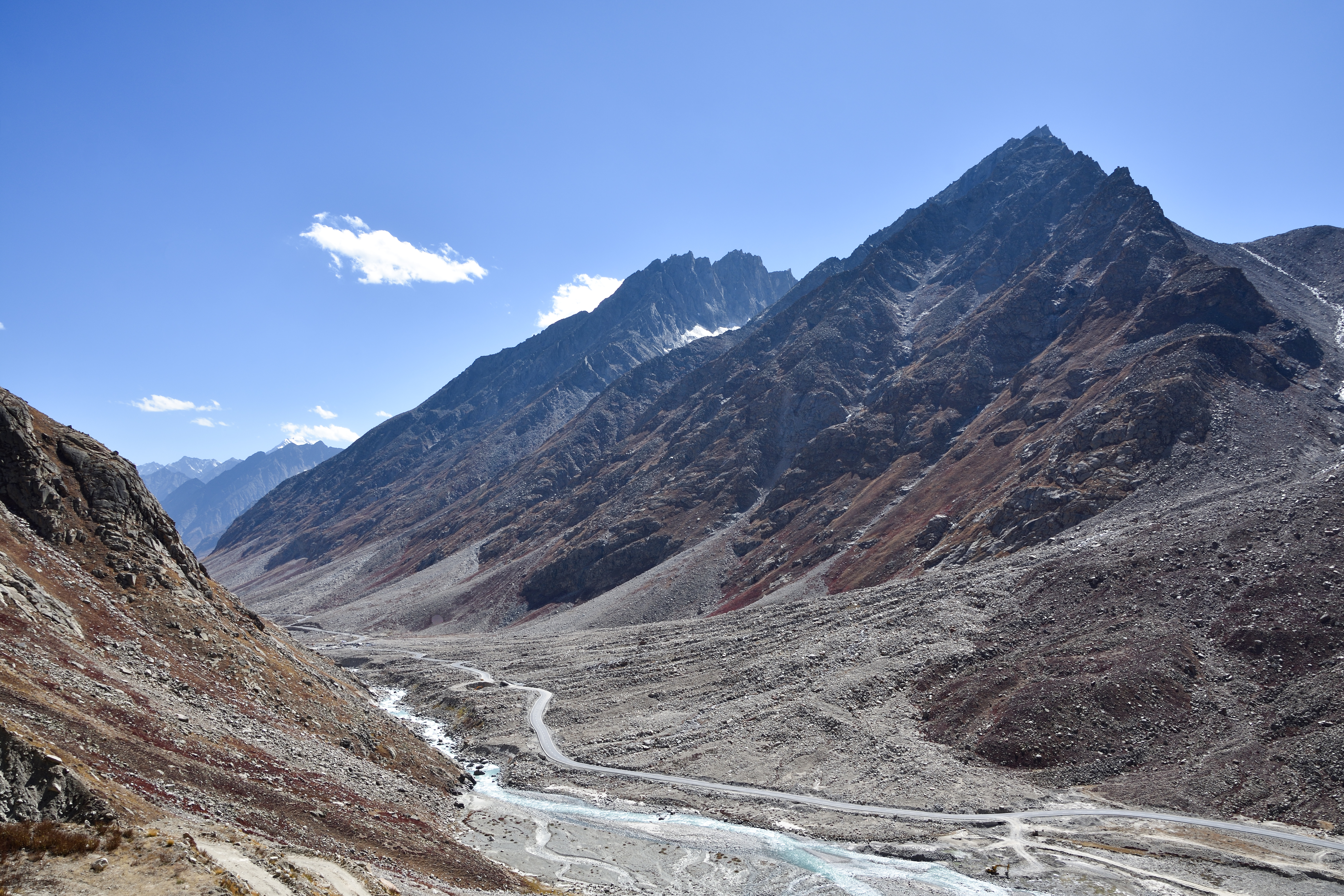
New road from Zanskar Sumdo to Darcha, Oct 2020.

The regions of Lahul (Lha yul) and Spiti (sPi ti) were earlier parts of Ladakh, but since 1684-1847 they were one by one removed from Ladakh. At the end of the Tibet–Ladakh–Mughal war (1679–1684 CE), Lahaul valley was separated from Ladakh by king Bidhi Singh of Chamba State who had sided with the Tibet-Mughal alliance. Following the end of the independent Kingdom of Ladakh (1842) and the Treaty of Amritsar (1846) between British East India Company and king Gulab Singh of Jammu and Kashmir princely state, Spiti valley too was officially separated from Ladakh by the British. In 1847, Lahaul and Spiti were formally added to the Kangra district of British Punjab by the British Raj, legally severing the ancient ties to Zanskar. (Note: Lahul was separated from Ladakh at the end of the Tibet–Ladakh–Mughal War (1679–1684) and Upper Kinnaur was annexed to Bashahr. Spiti was annexed to British India after the Treaty of Amritsar through a poorly documented transaction.)

Nevertheless, Lahaulis fought for the defence of Ladakh and Zanskar during the Indo-Pakistani War of 1947–1948. Major Prithi Chand of Indian Army trekked over the Zoji La pass in winter to arrive in Leh before the Pakistan-backed raiders from Gilgit could.

In 1979, when Ladakh was divided into two districts by the state of Jammu and Kashmir, the predominantly Buddhist region of Zanskar was attached to the Muslim-majority Kargil district. Work on the stretch of the road between Nimmu and Padum, called the Chadar Road, was begun by the Jammu and Kashmir Public Works Department in the 1970s. But it was reportedly cancelled by a member of the Legislative Assembly from Srinagar to prevent linking of Zanskar with Leh. Due to linguistic and religious similarities between Tibeta Buddhist-majority Zanskar and Leh, the Muslim politicians of Kargil had apprehensions that Zanskar might eventually come under Leh district's jurisdiction. So, instead of the Chadar Road, a road between Kargil and Padum was constructed, keeping Padum and Zanskar valley cut off from the road access to Leh city and Lahaul and Spiti valleys.

Following the Kargil War in 1999, the unfinished Nimmu–Padum "Chadar Road" project was handed over to the Border Roads Organisation (BRO) for completion. The construction of a road along the Chadar trek (the frozen Zanskar River during winters) faced opposition from stakeholders, such as trekkers who believed it would destroy the area's wild, pristine environment. Furthermore, in 2007, the central government questioned the Jammu and Kashmir state government regarding the necessity of this project. Despite this, the Buddhist councillor of the Lingshed constituency defended the construction of road, arguing that its construction was a vital "right" for developing the region's remote and underdeveloped villages.

Between May 2014 and June 2017, a 38 km long rudimentary road on the Padum-Darcha section was first constructed from Ramjak in Lahaul to Kargyakh in Zanskar via the Shingo La. It was built by Tsultrim Chonjor (also called "Meme Chonjor"), a Buddhist retired government employee from Zanskar who funded the project himself with the help from local villagers.After failing to convince the government to construct the road, he decided to build it himself; he was subsequently awarded the Padma Shri in 2021 for his efforts.

On 20 June 2024, the Himachal Road Transport Corporation (HRTC) conducted a trial run of a bus service from Keylong in Lahaul to Padum. This is the first time that a public bus has traversed this route. The 37-seat bus took 9 hours for the journey. Commercial service during the summer months only, June to October, is expected to start after further formalities.

== Route ==
The northern terminus is located at Nimmu in Ladakh, about 35 km (22 mi) east of Leh. The distance from Nimmu via Padum to the southern terminus at Darcha in Himachal Pradesh is 297 km (185 mi). The road consists of three major sections: Nimmu – Padum, Padum – Shingo La, Shingo La – Darcha.

=== Nimmu terminus to Padum ===
The total distance from Nimmu to Padum is 156 km (97 mi) on the proposed alignment. Only 15 km remained to be commissioned as of May 2023. This section covers the following towns/villages:

- Nimmu
- Chiling
- Nerak
- Zangla
- Padum
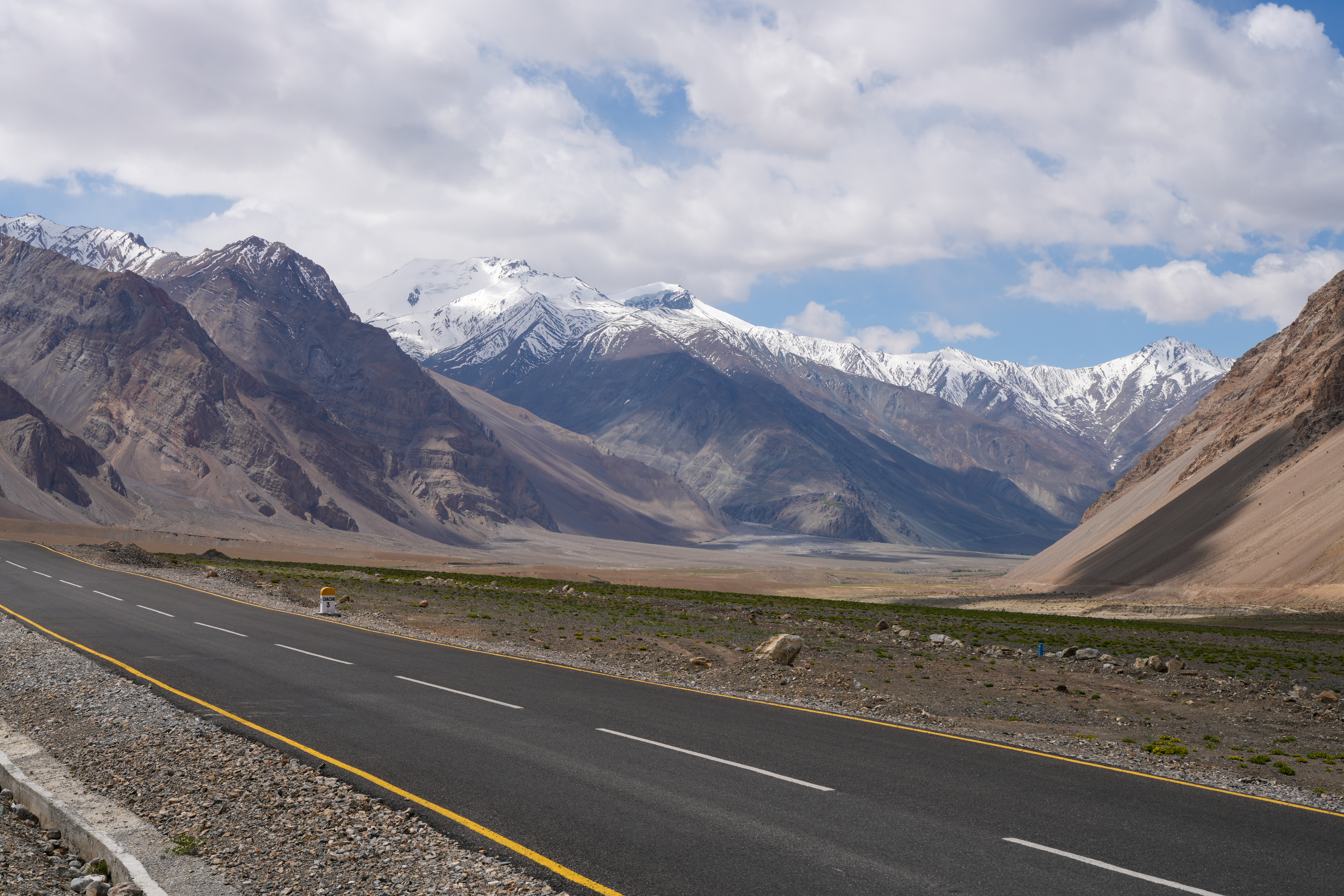
NPD road towards Padum, ~6 km (3.7 mi) south of Zangla

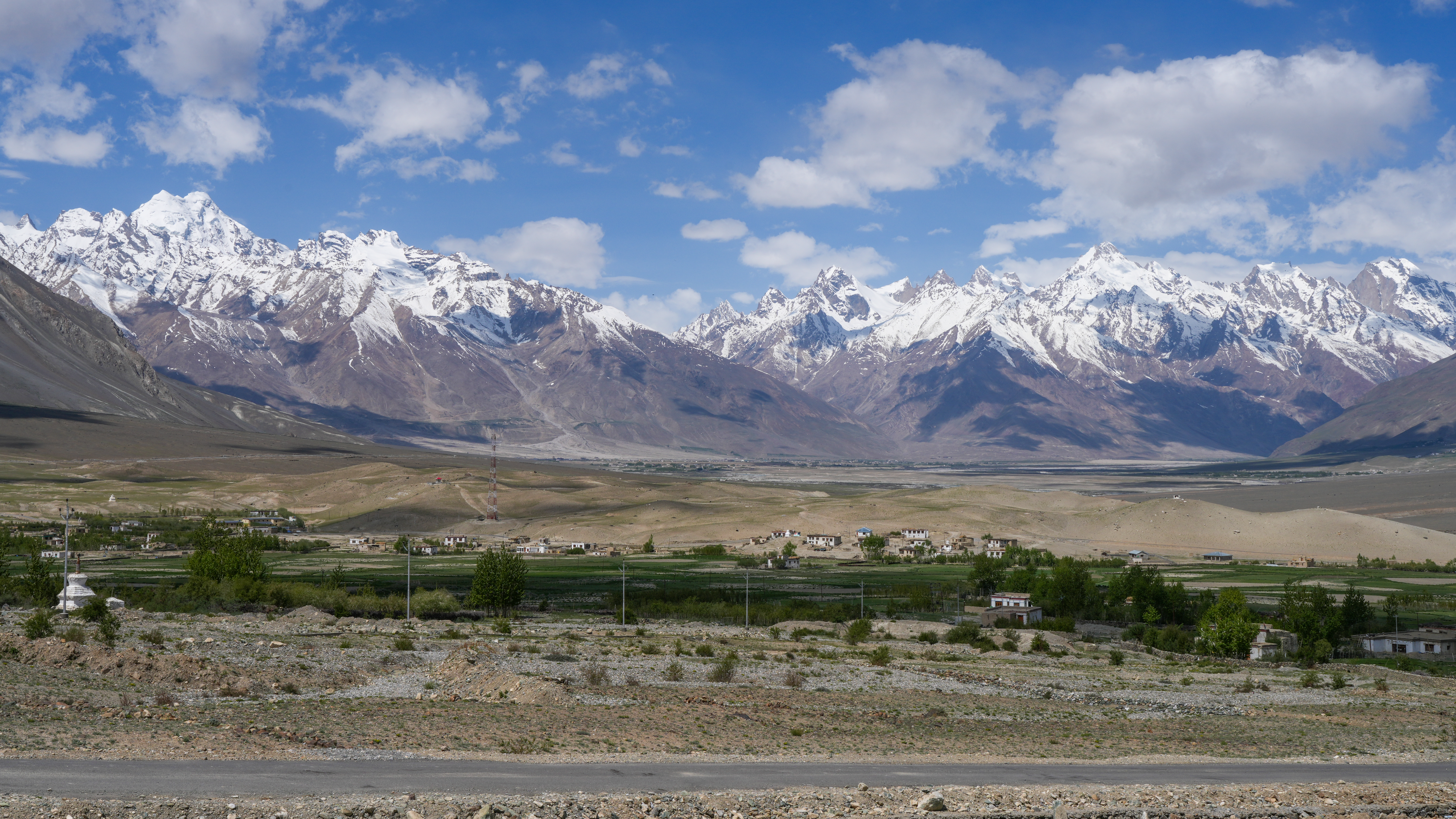
Stongdey village below the NPD road

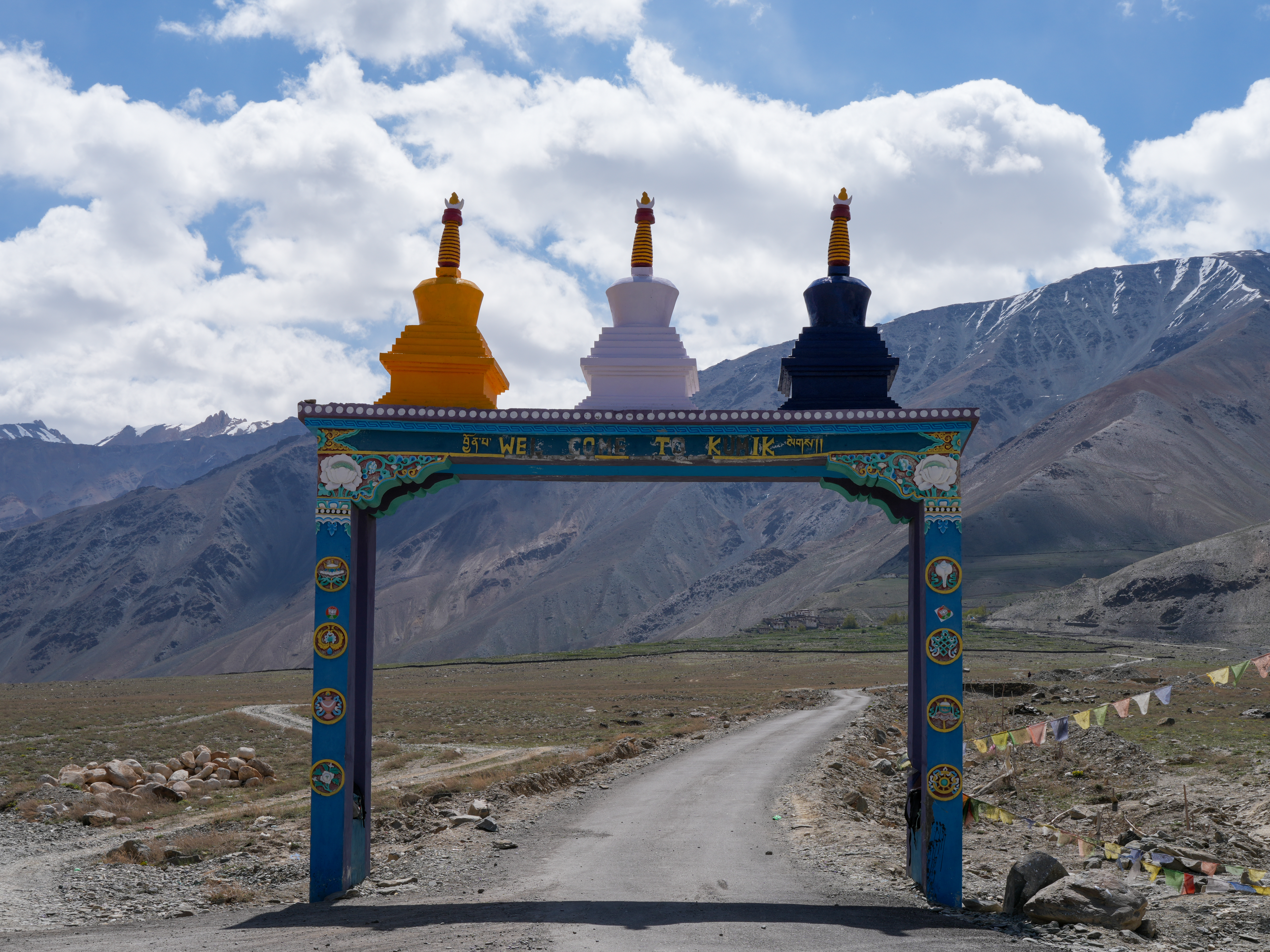
Entrance arch to spur road to Kumik village

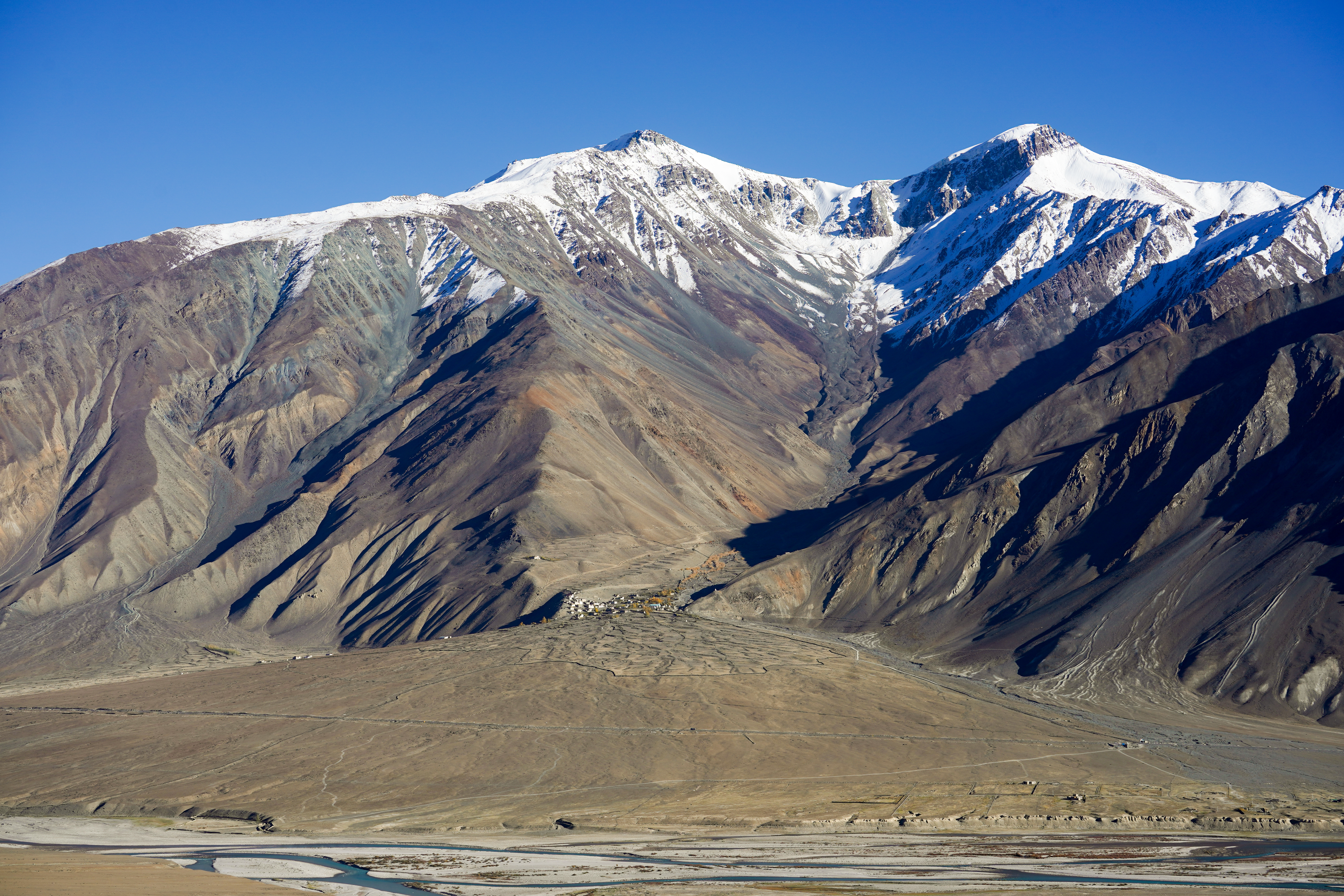
Zanskar - Stod confluence near Padum. Road from Nimmu lower left, to Padum lower right.

=== Padum to Shingo La pass ===
From Padum, the road runs south along the Tsarap Lingti Chu river up to Purne, a distance of 53 km (33 mi). At Purne, the road crosses the river and continues along the Kargiakh Chu, a left bank tributary of the Tsarap up to Lakhang Sumdo. This distance of 39 km (24 mi) has a gentle gradient. Thereafter, the road climbs steeply from 4,460 m (14,630 ft) up to the Shingo La pass at 5,091 m (16,703 ft), covering a distance of 10.5 km (6.5 mi). The total distance covered in this segment is 102.5 km (63.7 mi).

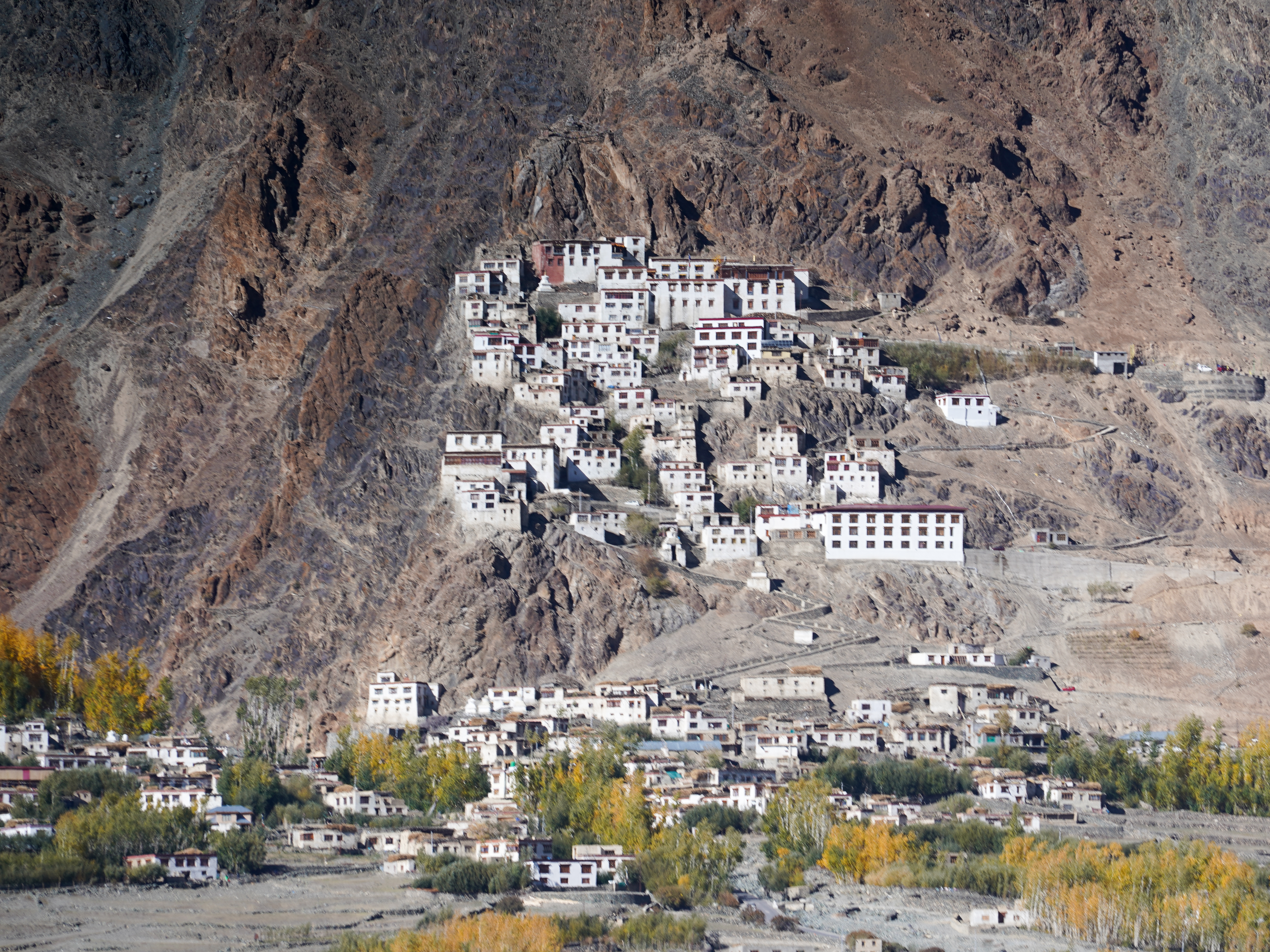
Karsha Gompa north of Padum

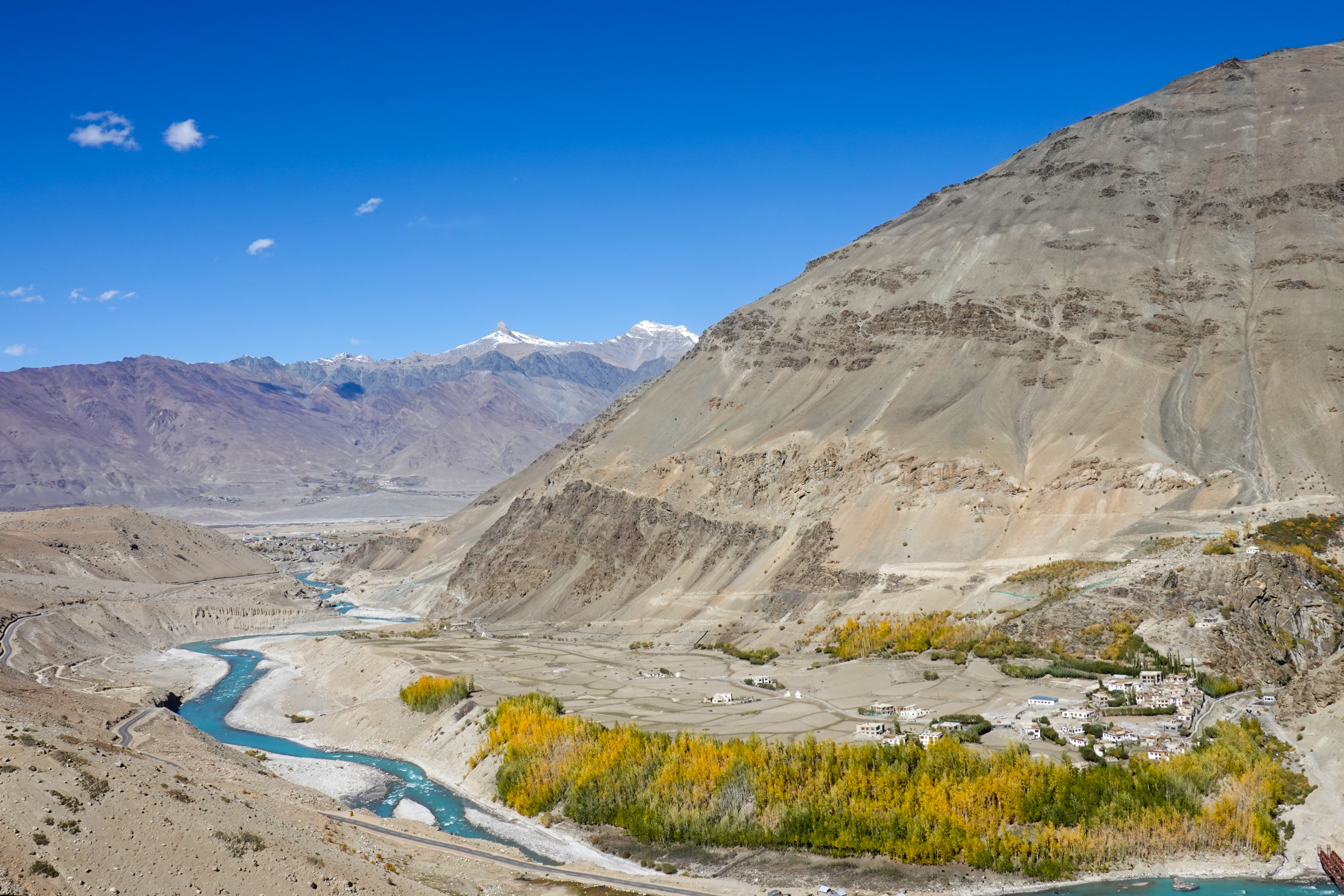
Road enters Padum valley along left bank of Tsarap

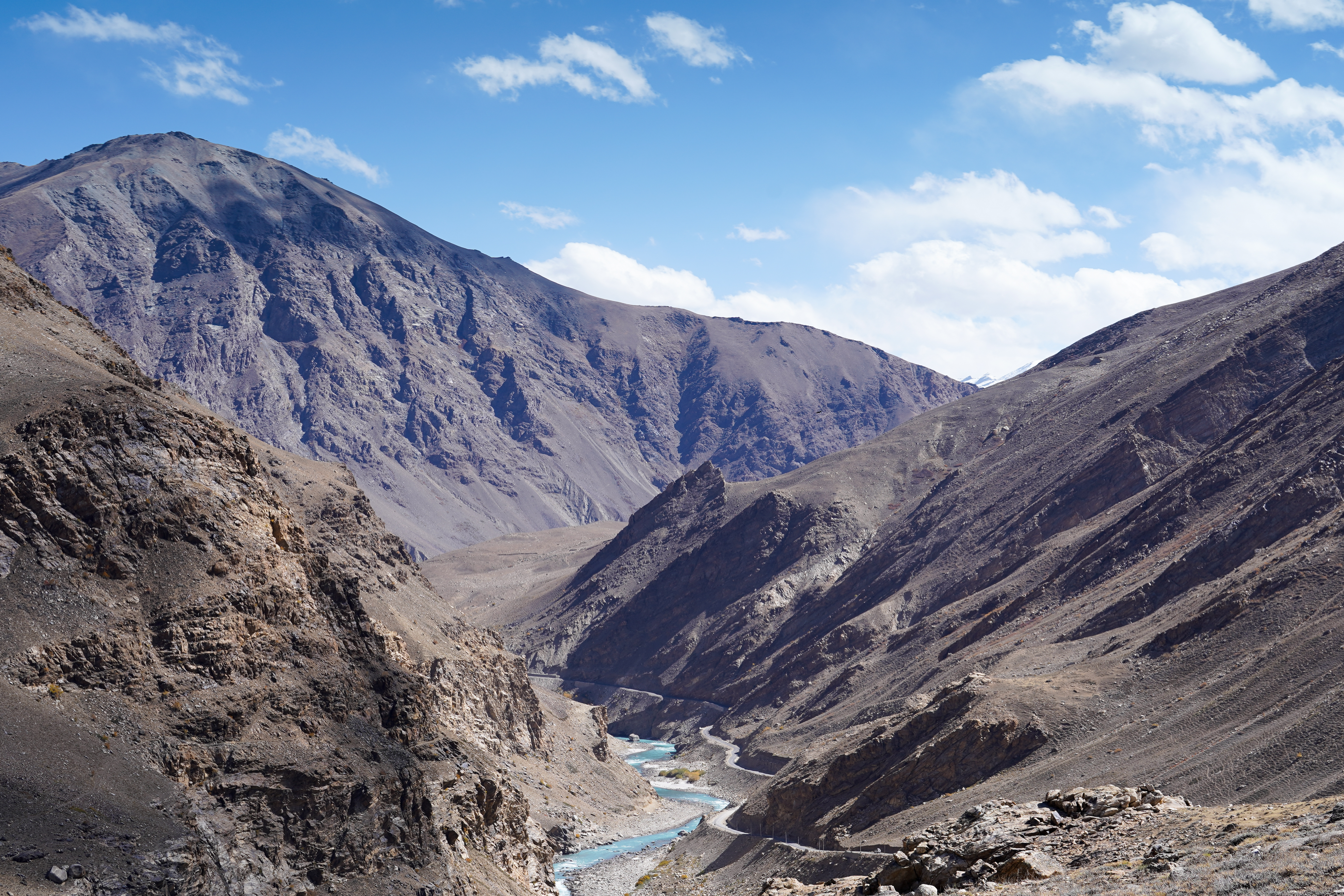
Tsarap gorge south from Padum

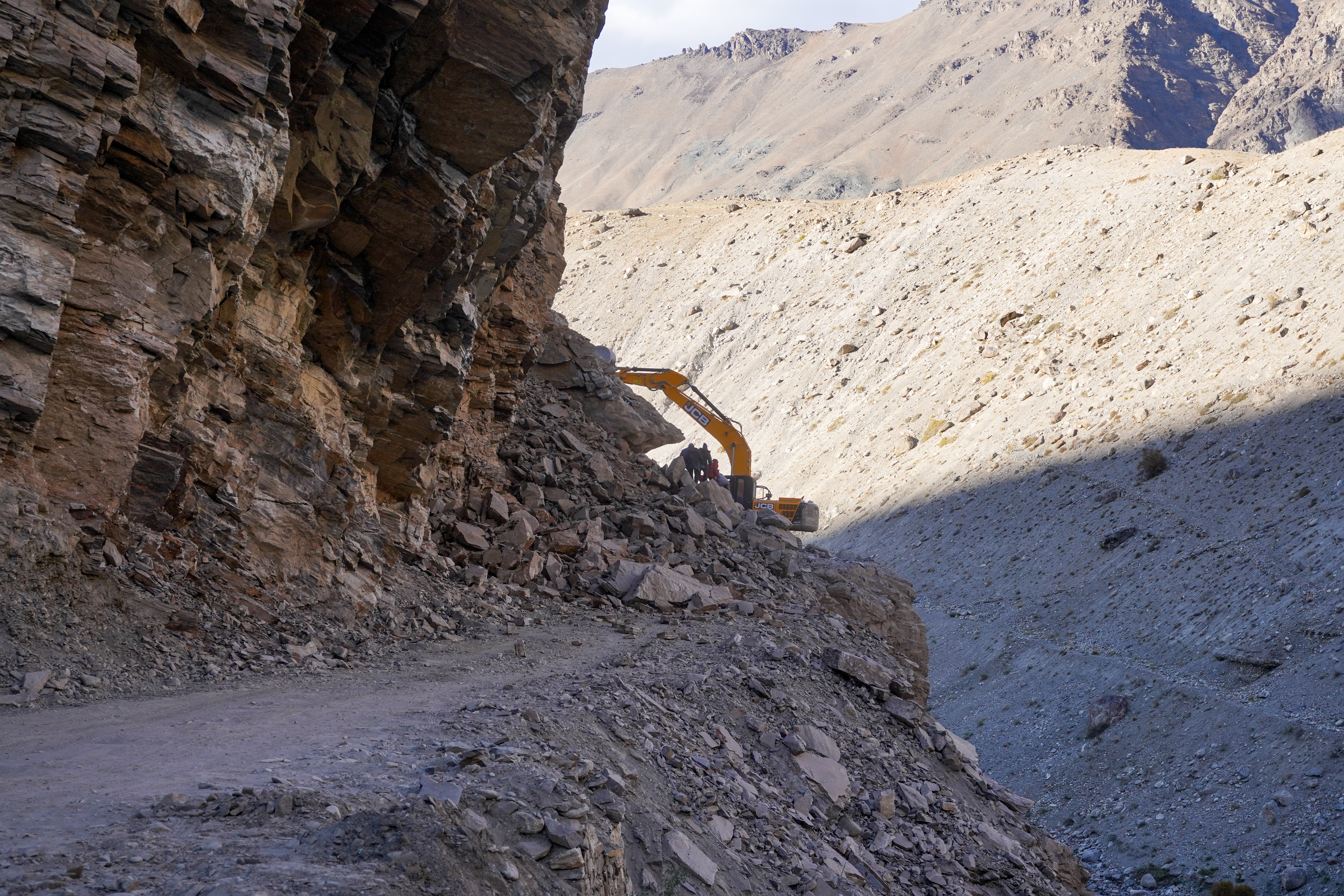
Road widening by blasting, Oct '22

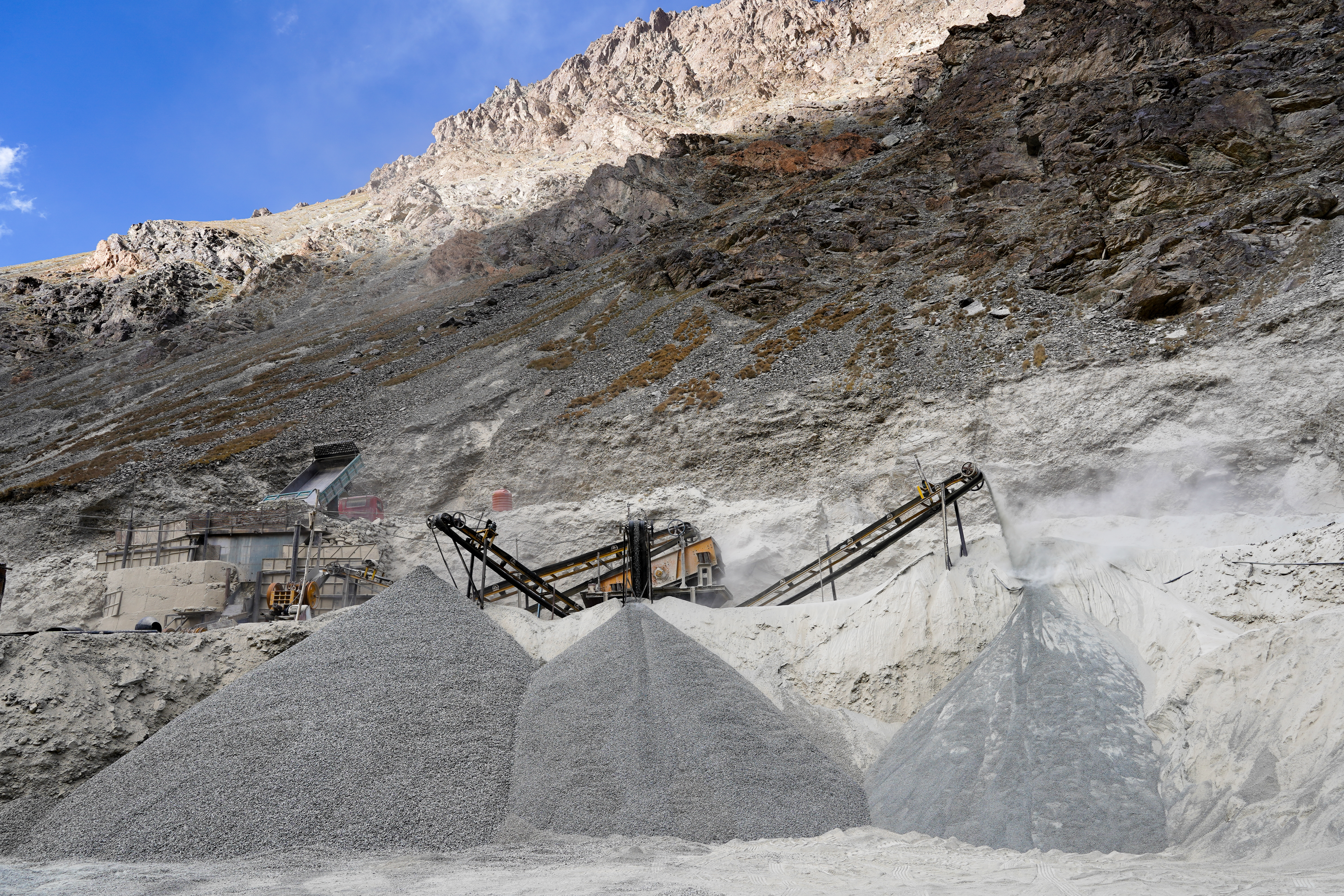
Batch mixing plant for road work, near Amnu

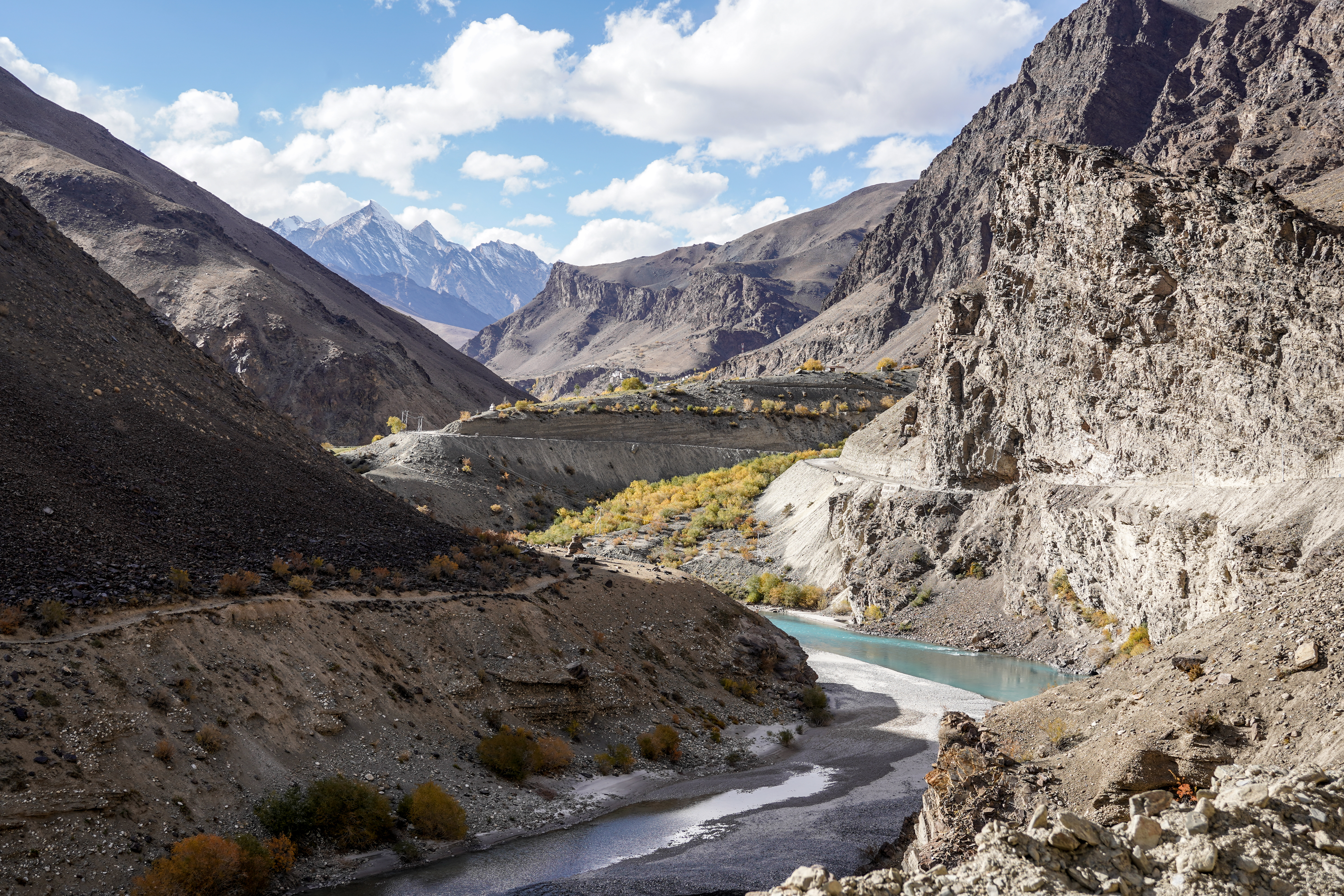
Road winding down the right bank of the Tsarap towards Padum, Oct '22

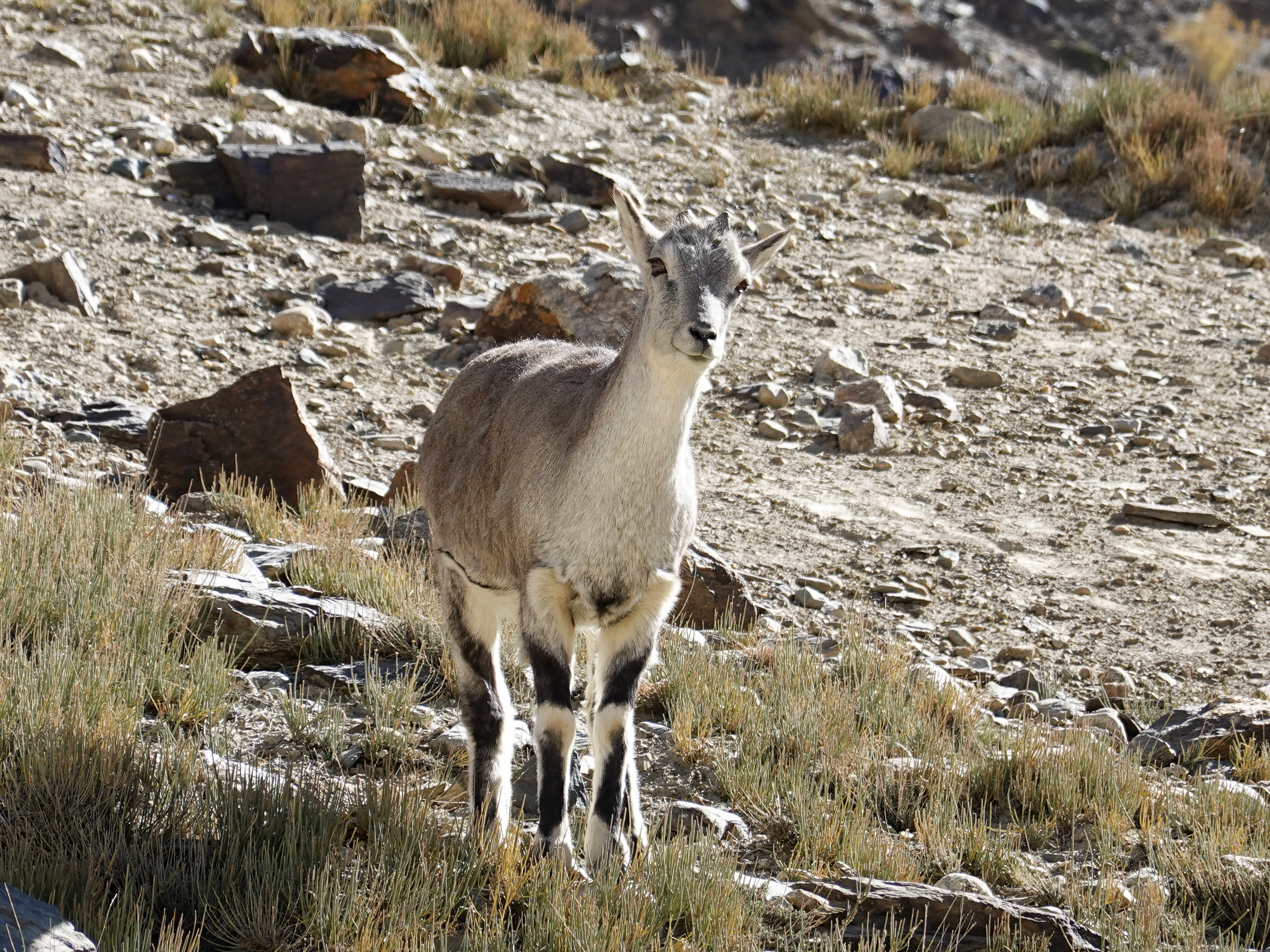
Grey goral doe

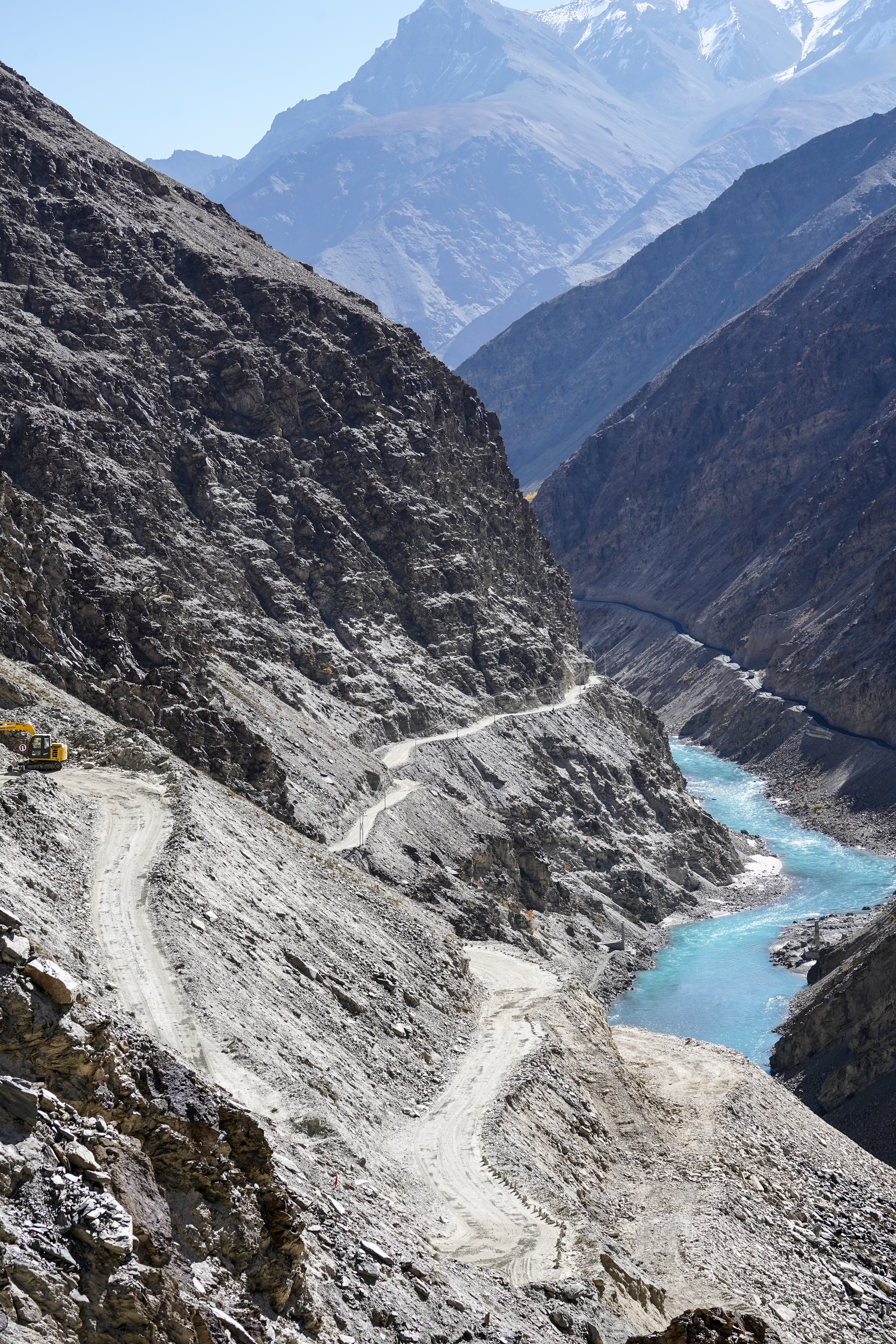
Road construction, Tsarap gorge, Oct '22

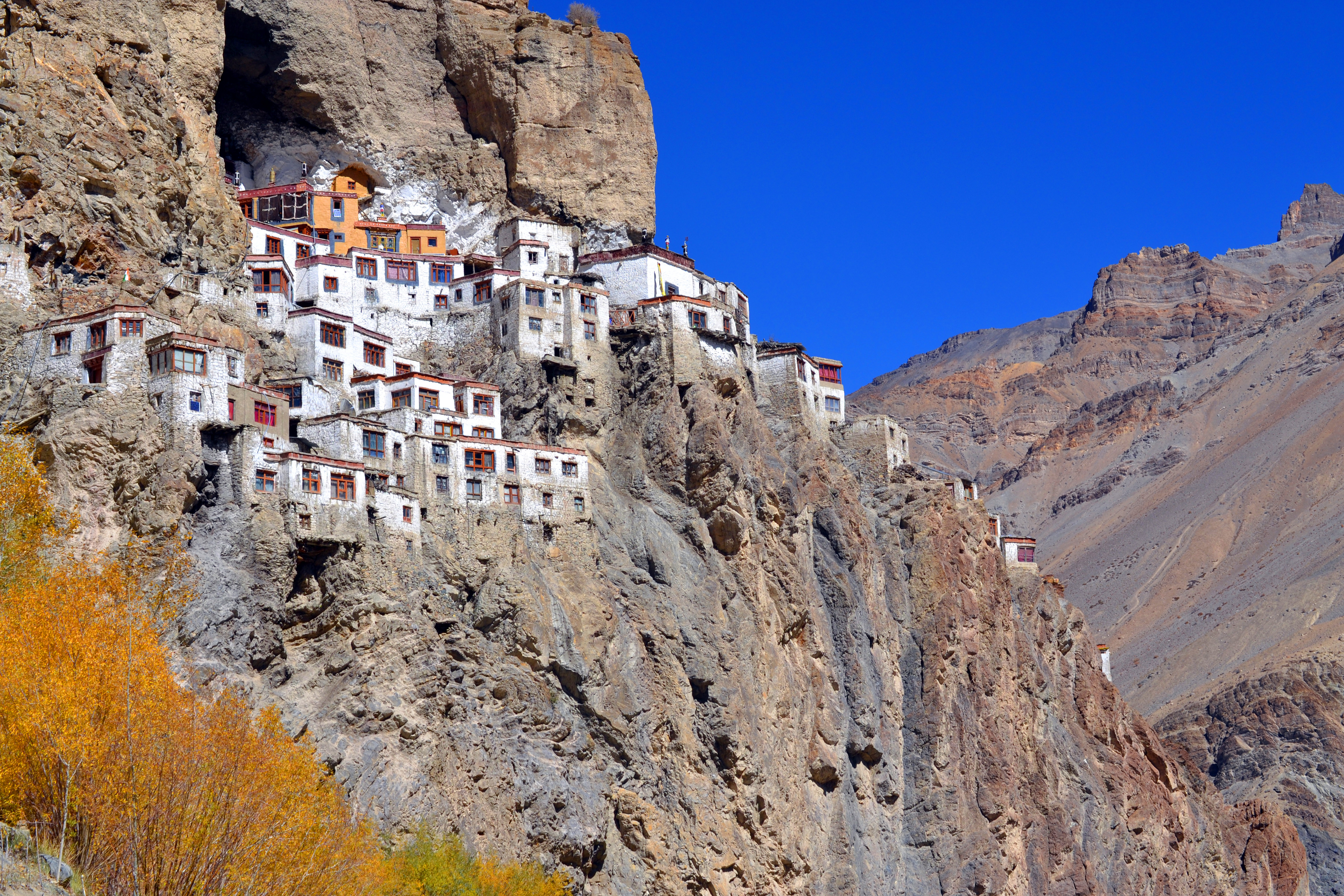
Phuktal Gompa near Purne

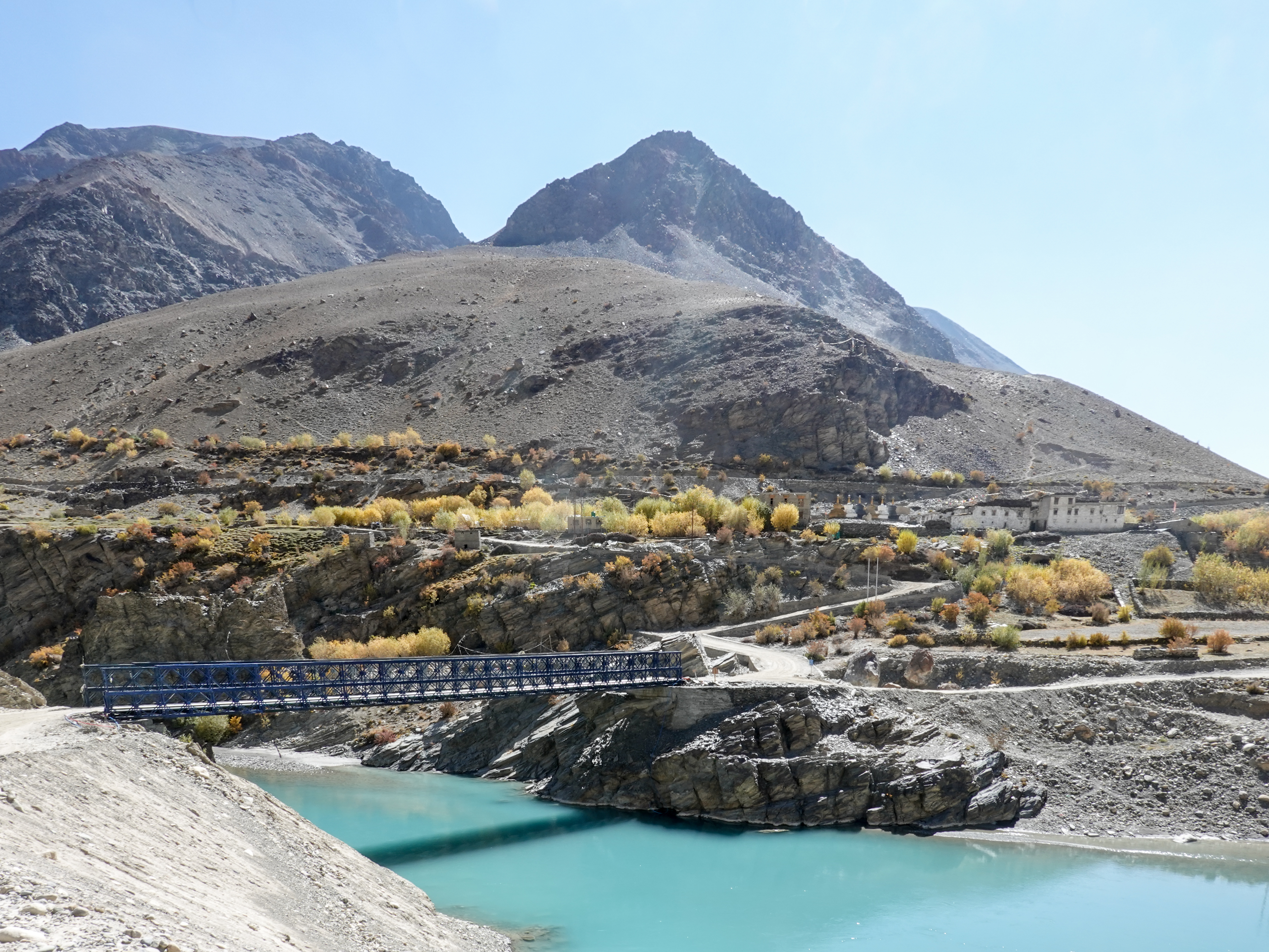
Bridge over the Tsarap at Purne, view from NW

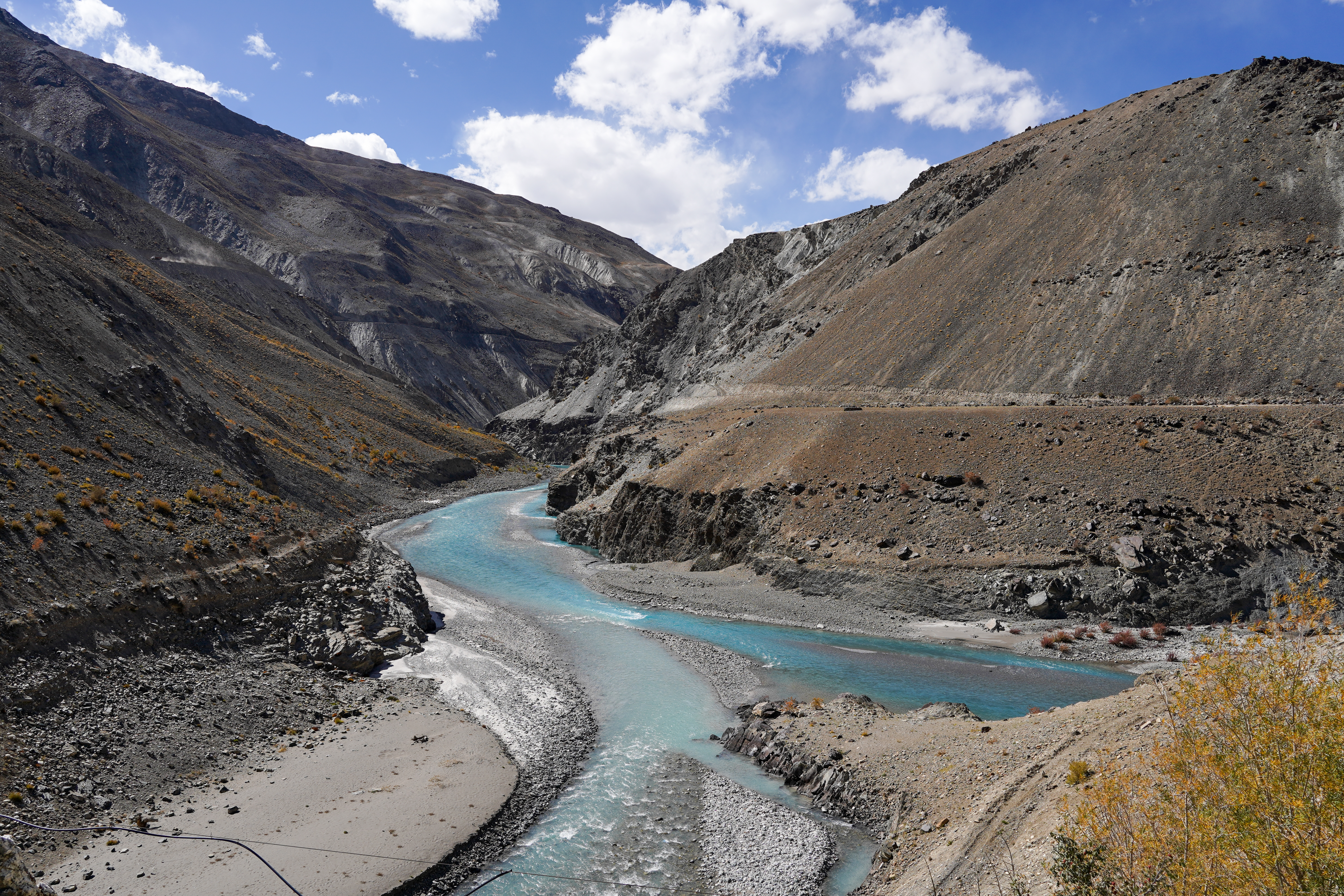
Confluence at Purne

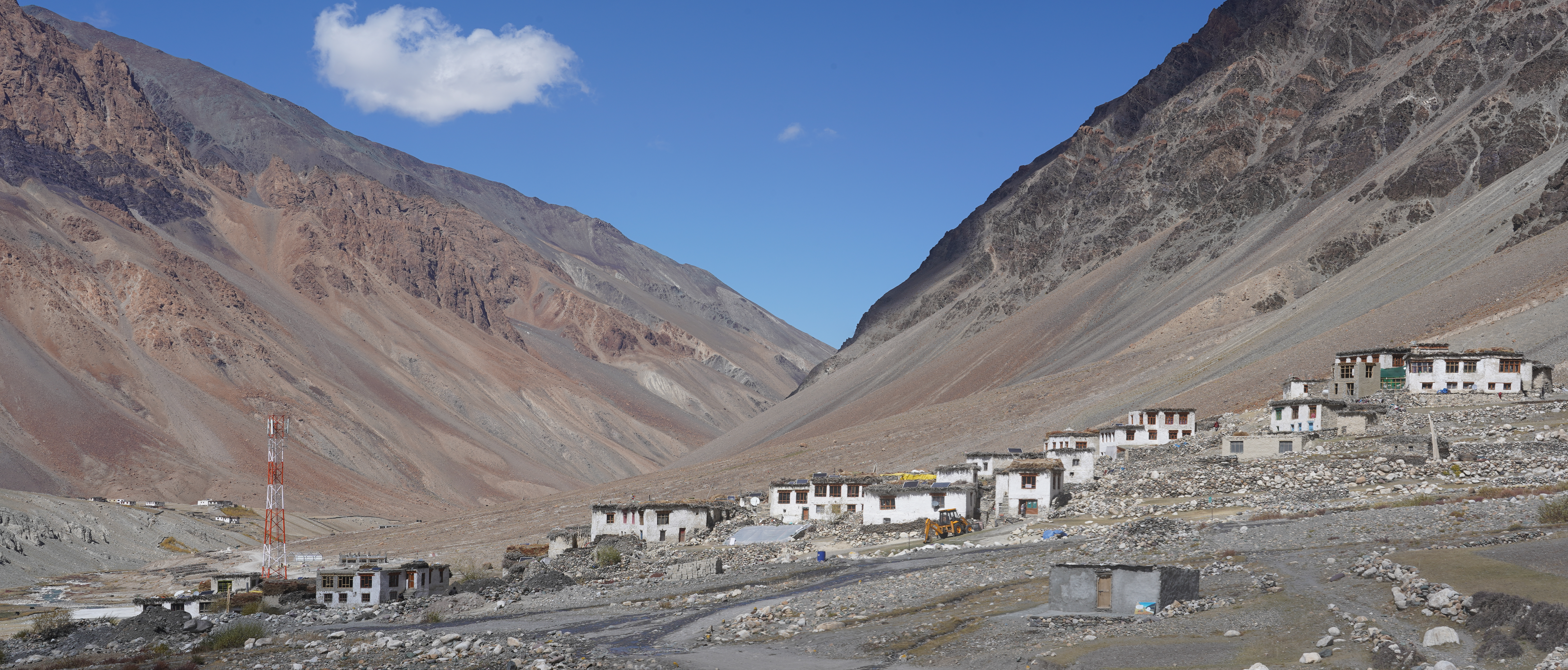
Kargyak, view from south

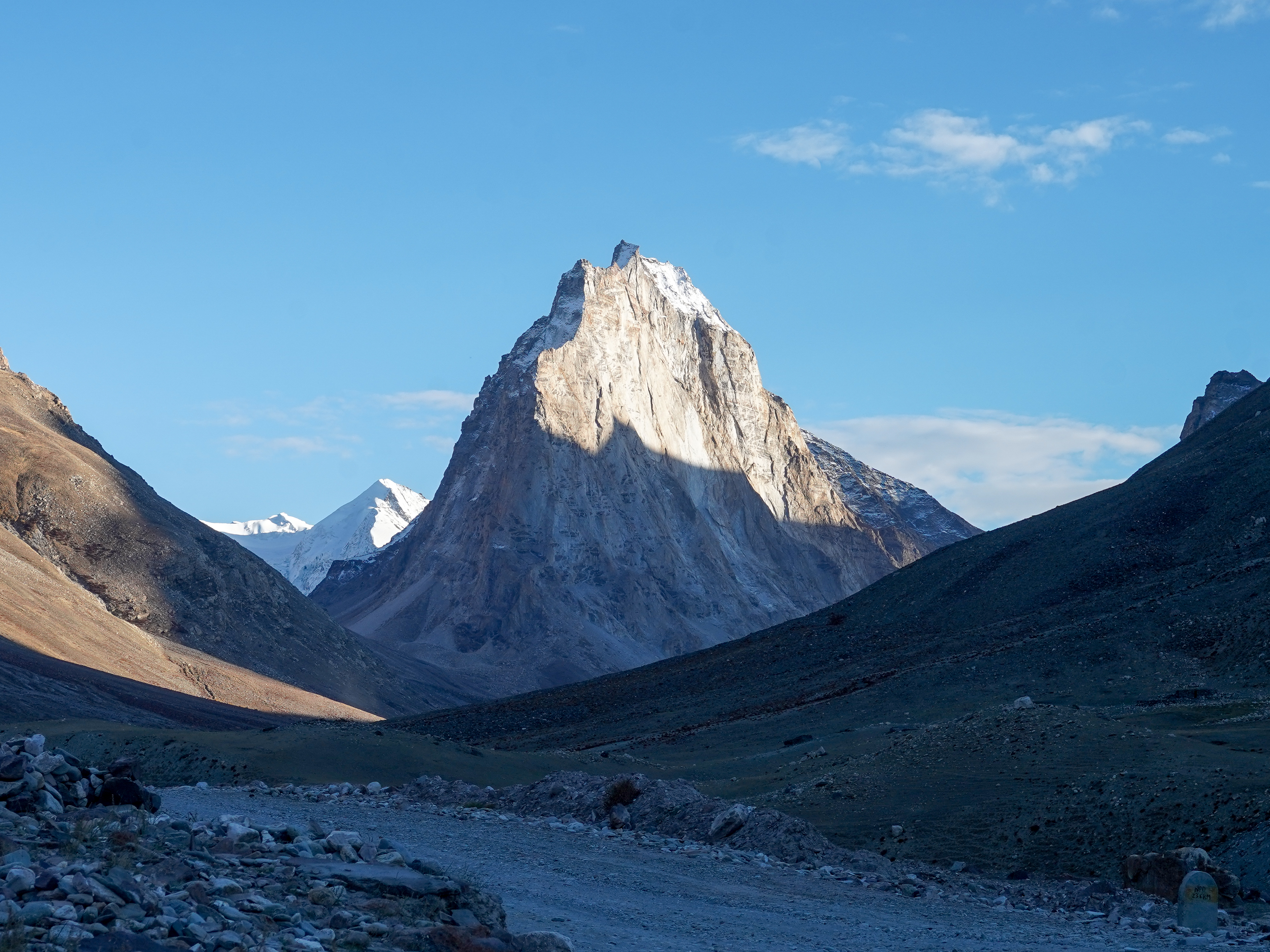
Road from Kargyak south to Gonbo Rangjon

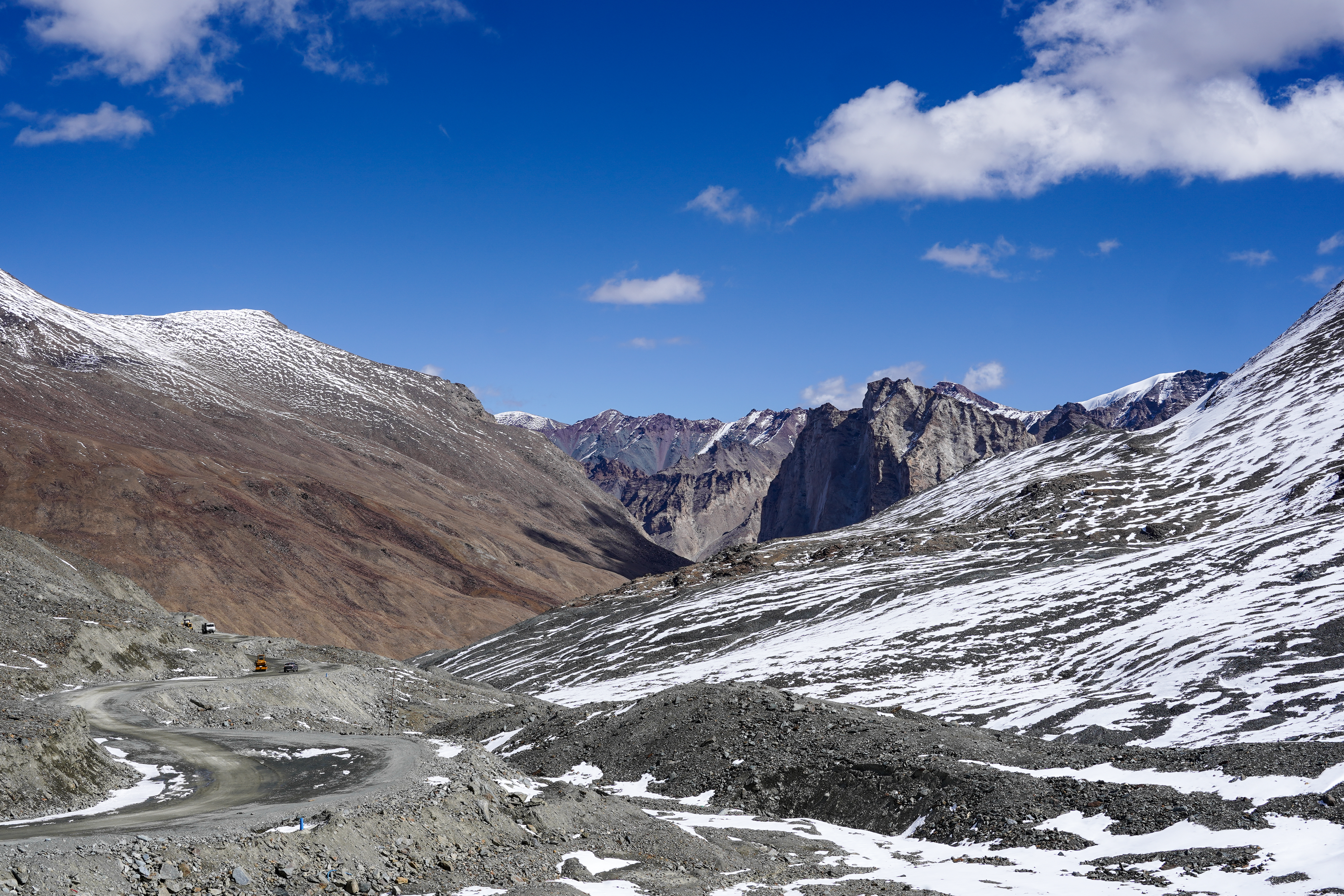
Road from Shingo La down towards Lakang Sumdo

=== Shingu La Tunnel ===
Shingo La Tunnel, also called the "Shinku La Tunnel", is under construction with the target completion date of August 2028.

=== Shingo La to Darcha terminus ===
The newly-surfaced road (as of Oct '21) continues from the Shingo La pass down to the Darcha terminus. The road descends on the right bank of the Jankar Nala through Ramjak to Zanskar Sumdo, which has a helipad. The Jankar Nala enters a short gorge about 100 ft (30 m) deep. On the sides of the gorge is a Buddhist shrine to the deity Palden Lhamo. The road crosses the gorge and runs along the left bank via Chikka and Rarik to meet the Leh-Manali Highway about 2 km before Darcha. This segment covers a distance of approximately 38 km (24 mi).

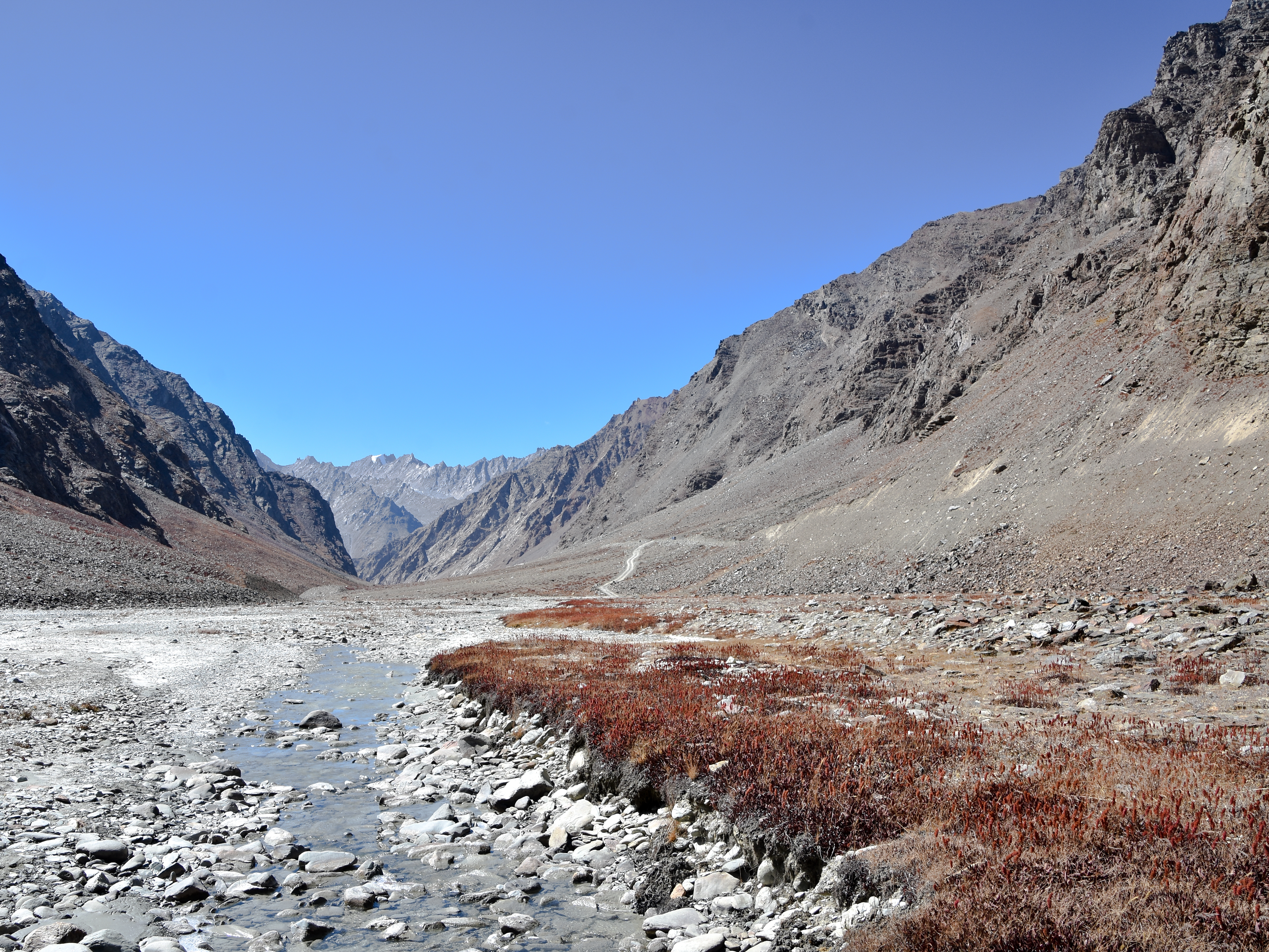
Road under construction on right bank of Jankar Sangpo near Ramjak, Oct '20

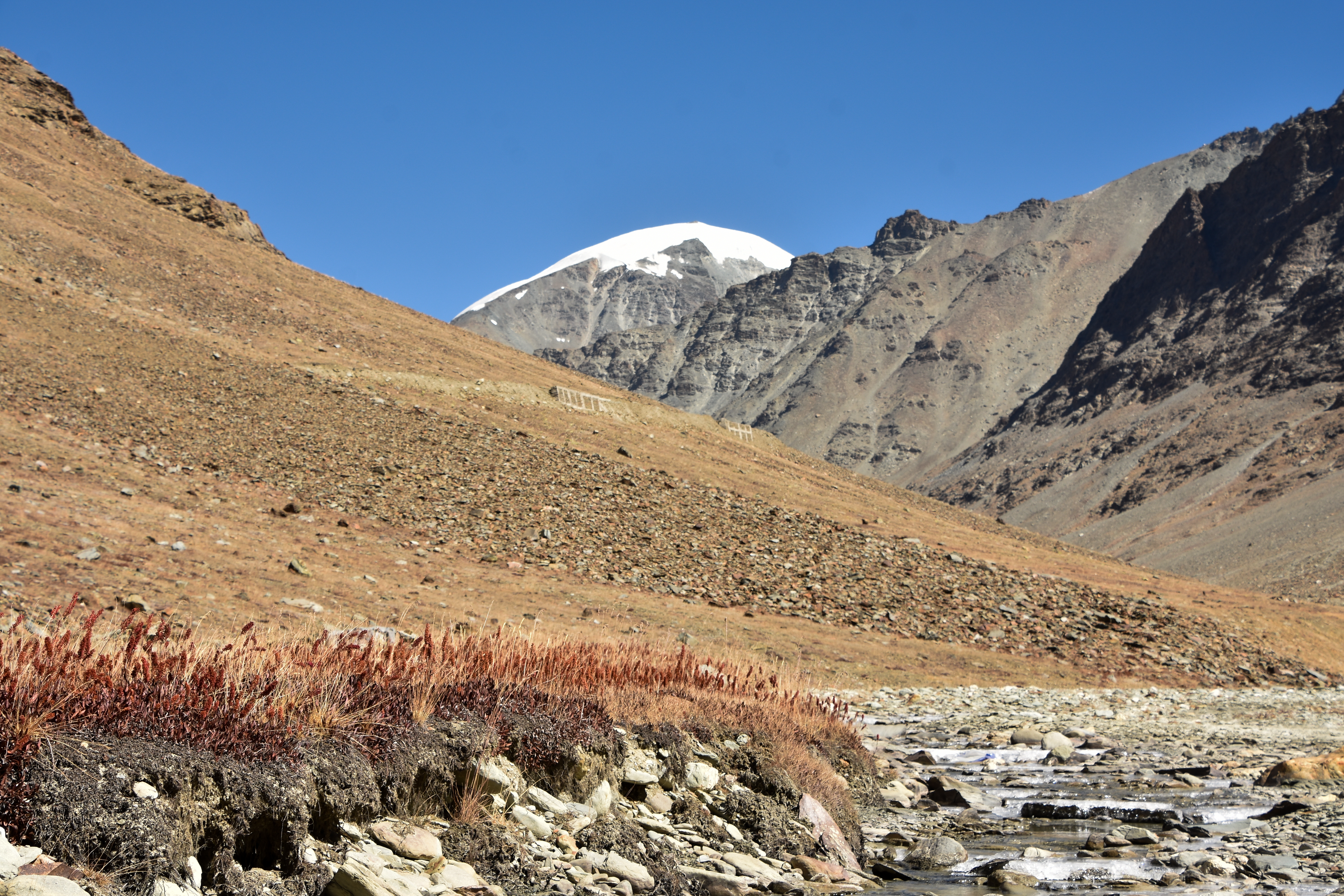
Ramjak up to Shingo Ri, road left to centre, Oct '20

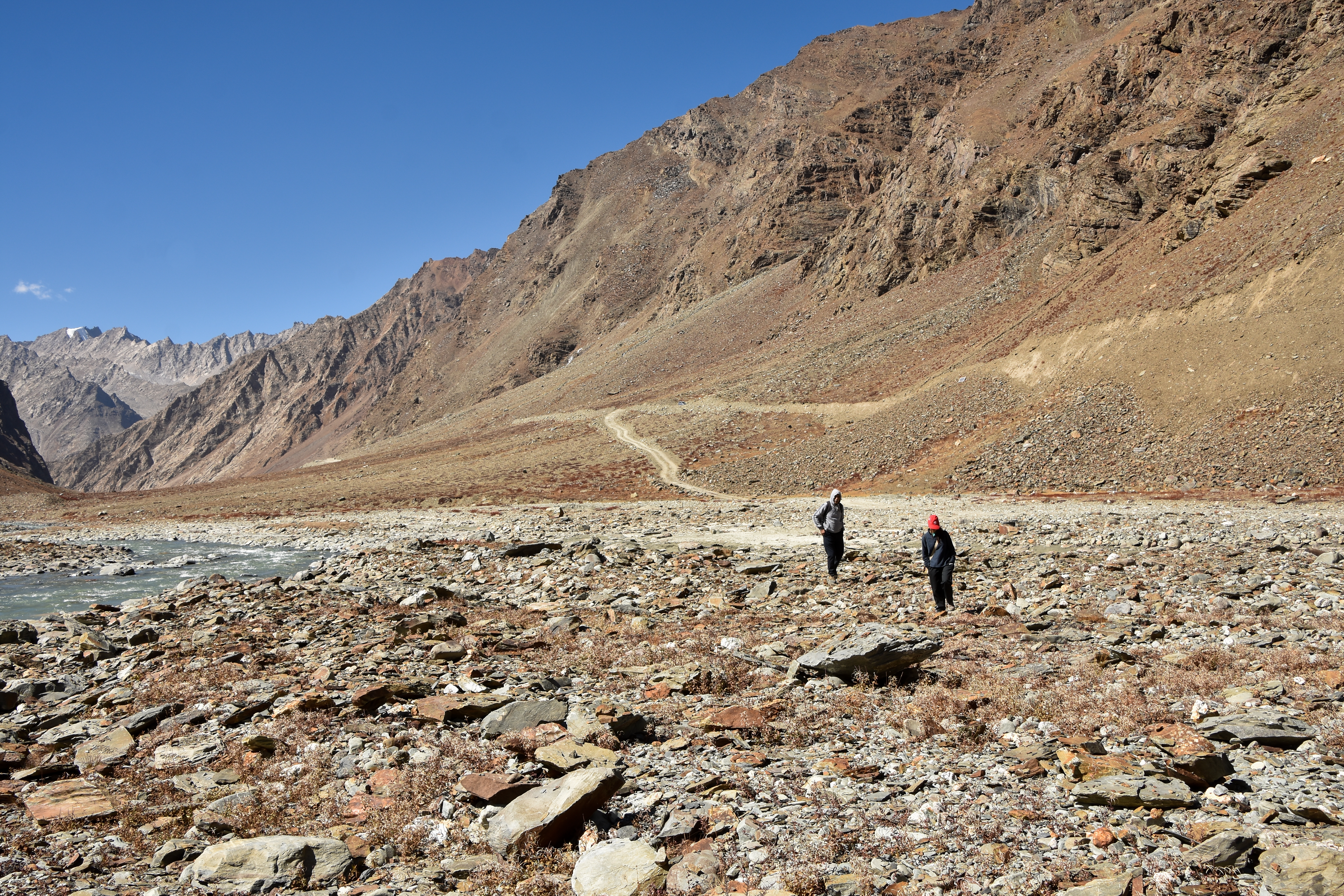
Road from right to centre, down Jankar Nala near Ramjak, Oct '20

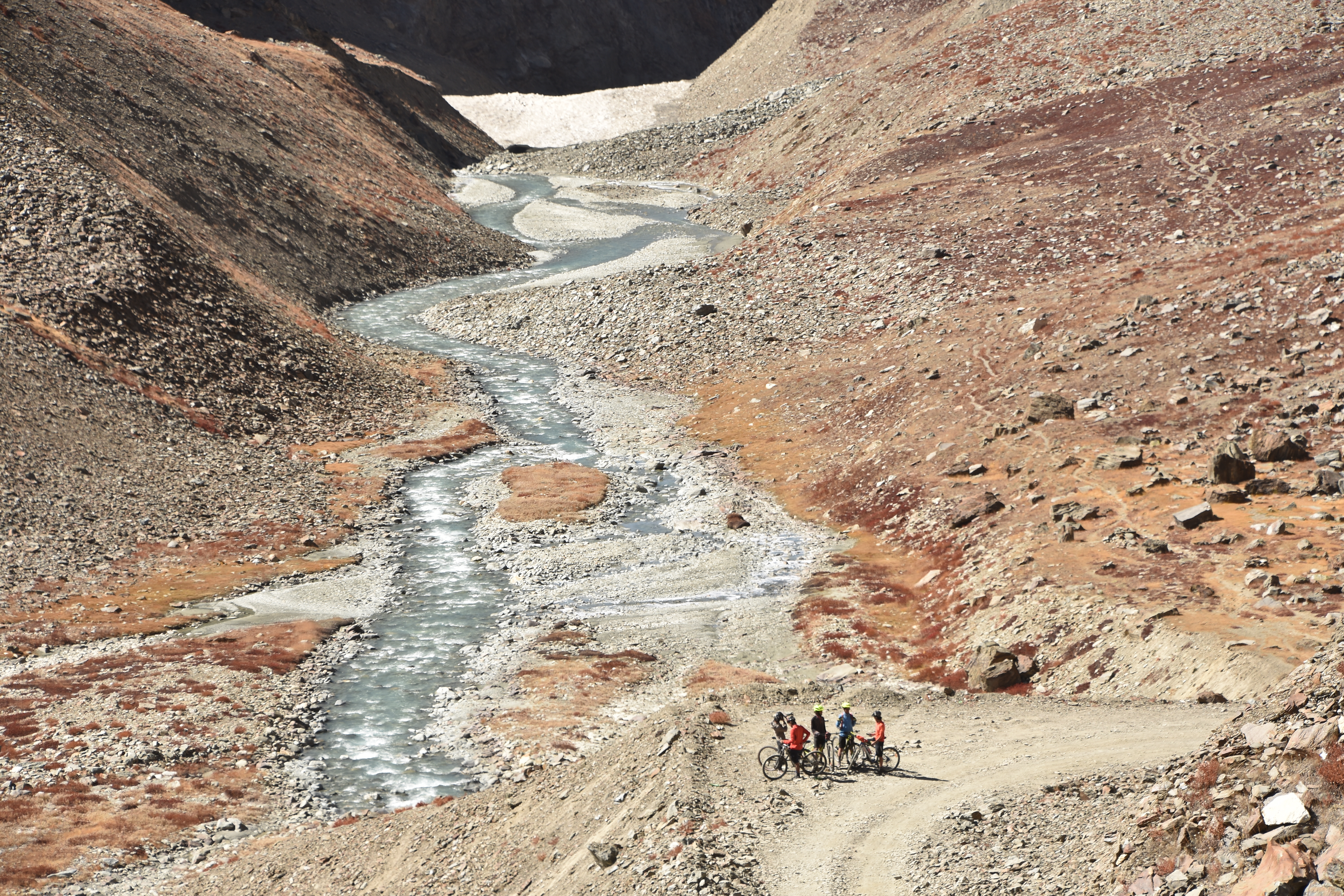
Cyclists on under-construction road to Shingo La pass, Oct '20

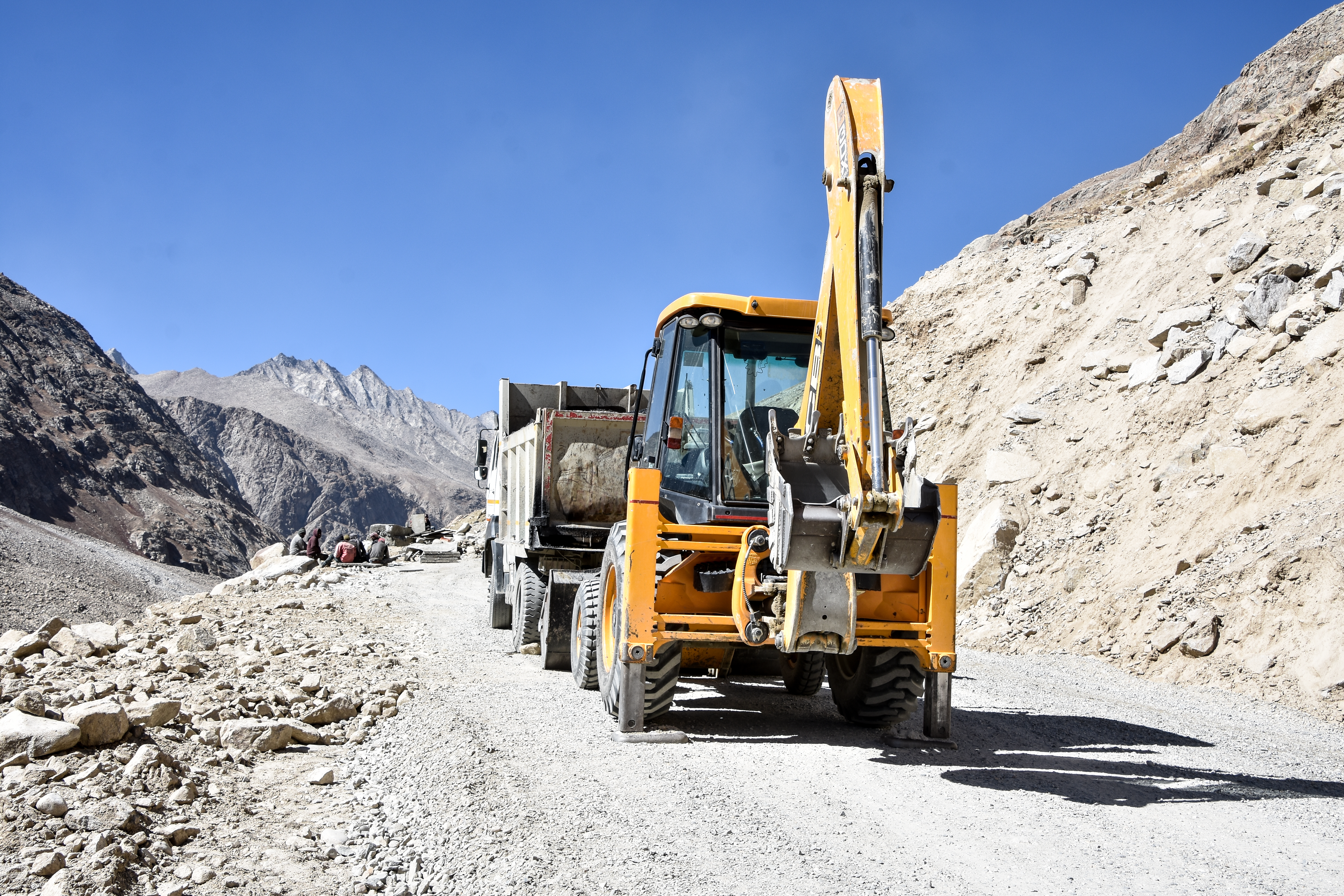
Road construction near Zanskar Sumdo, Oct '20

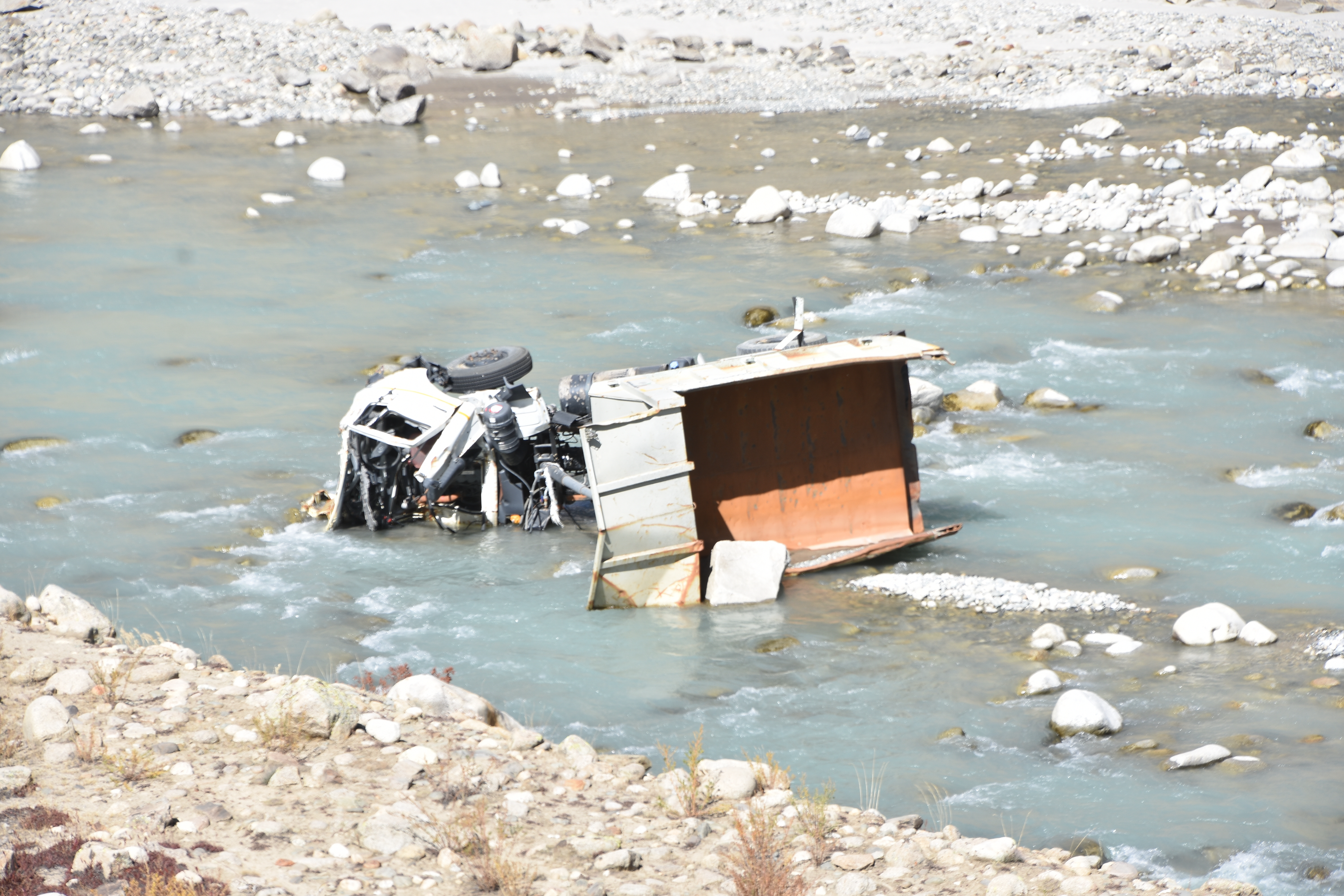
Road construction accident, Oct '20

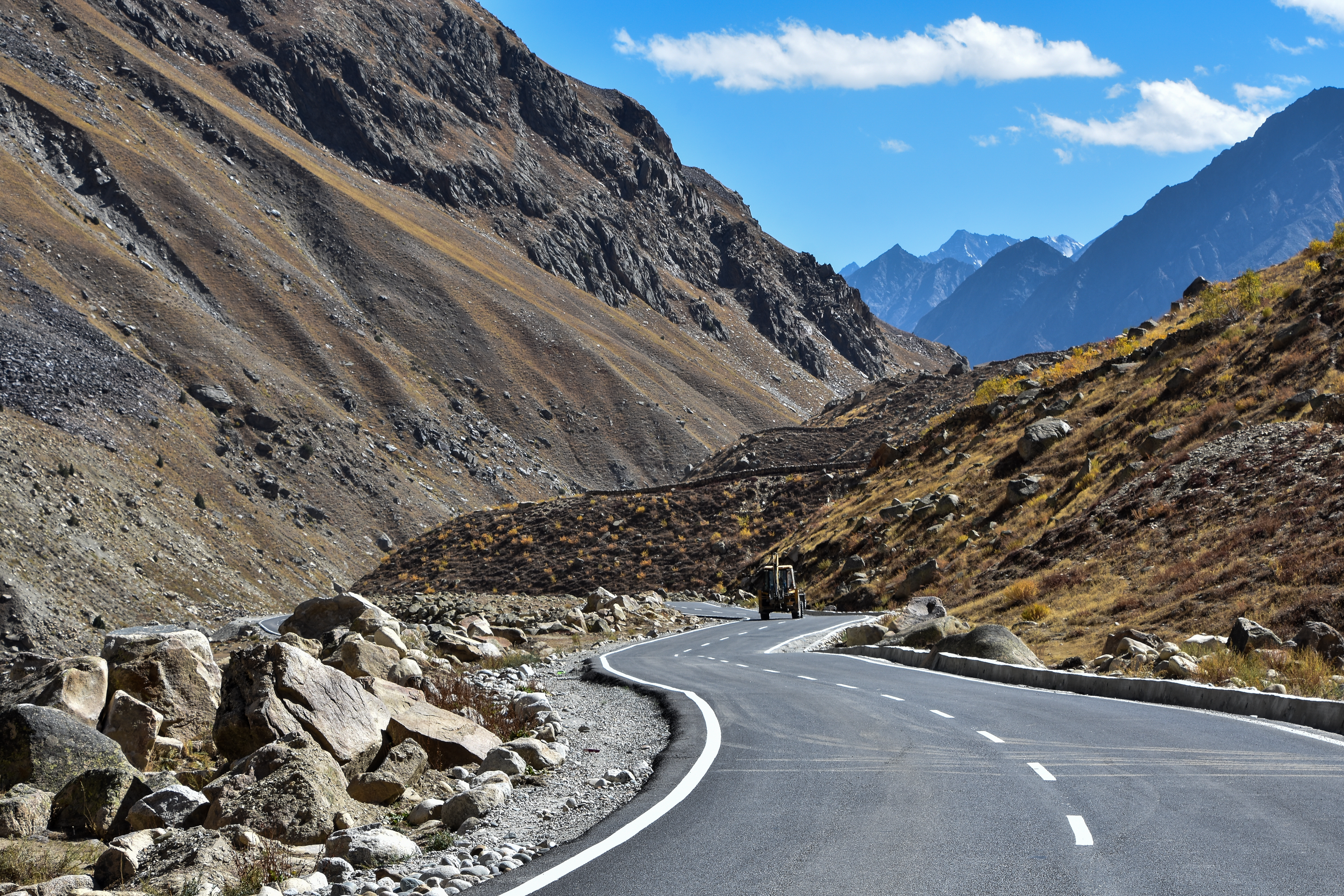
Newly-surfaced road below Zanskar Sumdo

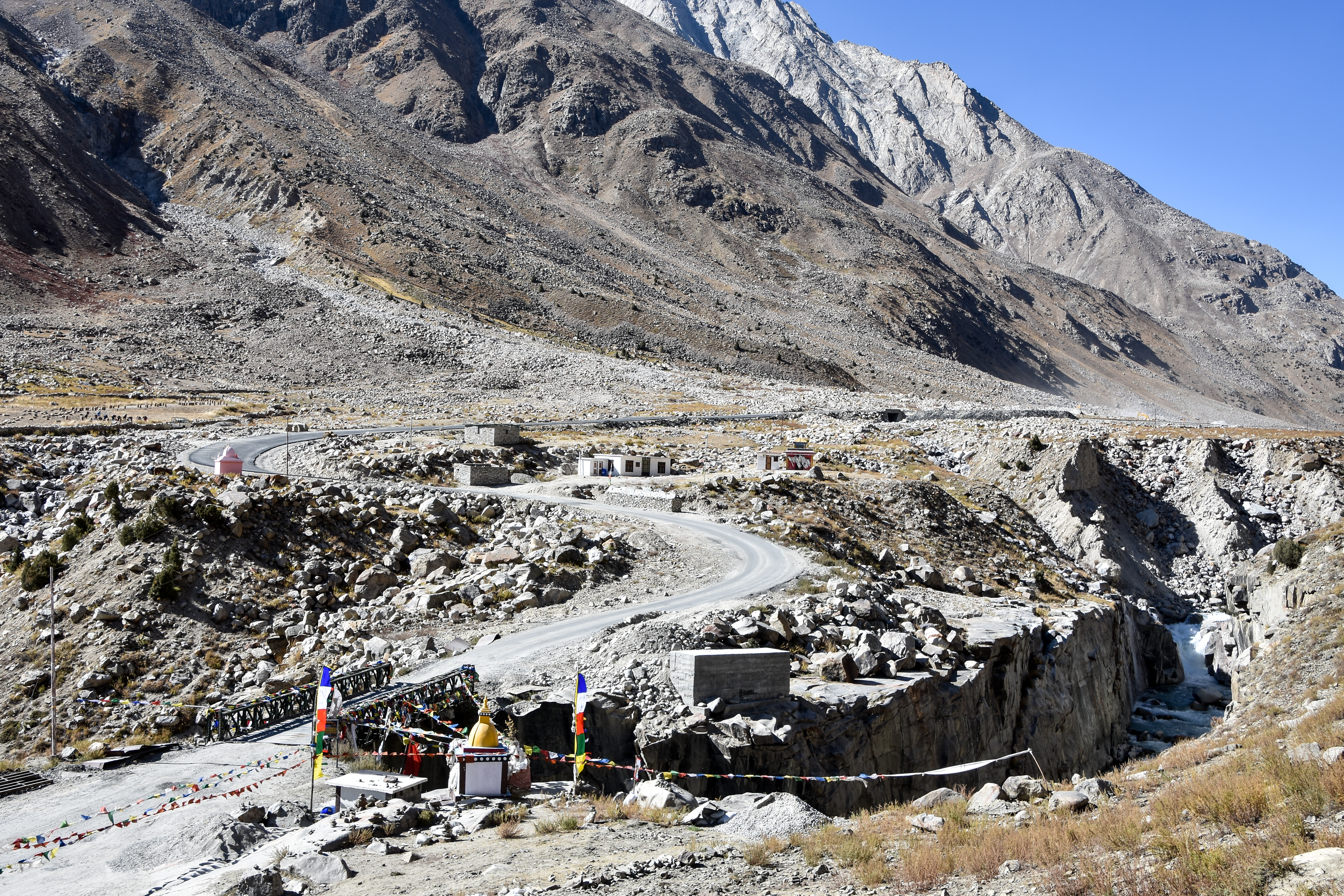
Gorge, bridge and shrine at Palden Lhamo, Oct '20

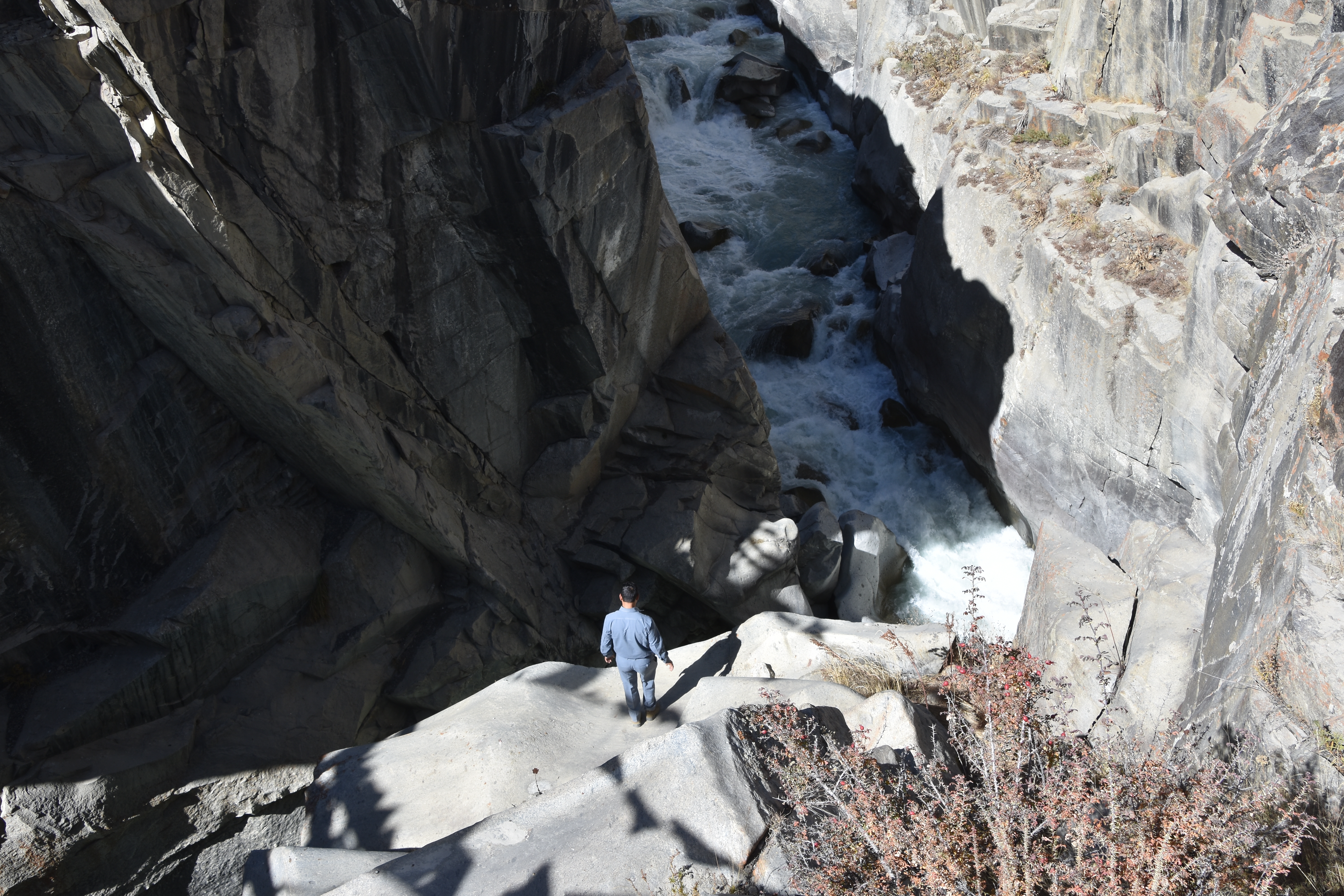
Jankar Nala gorge

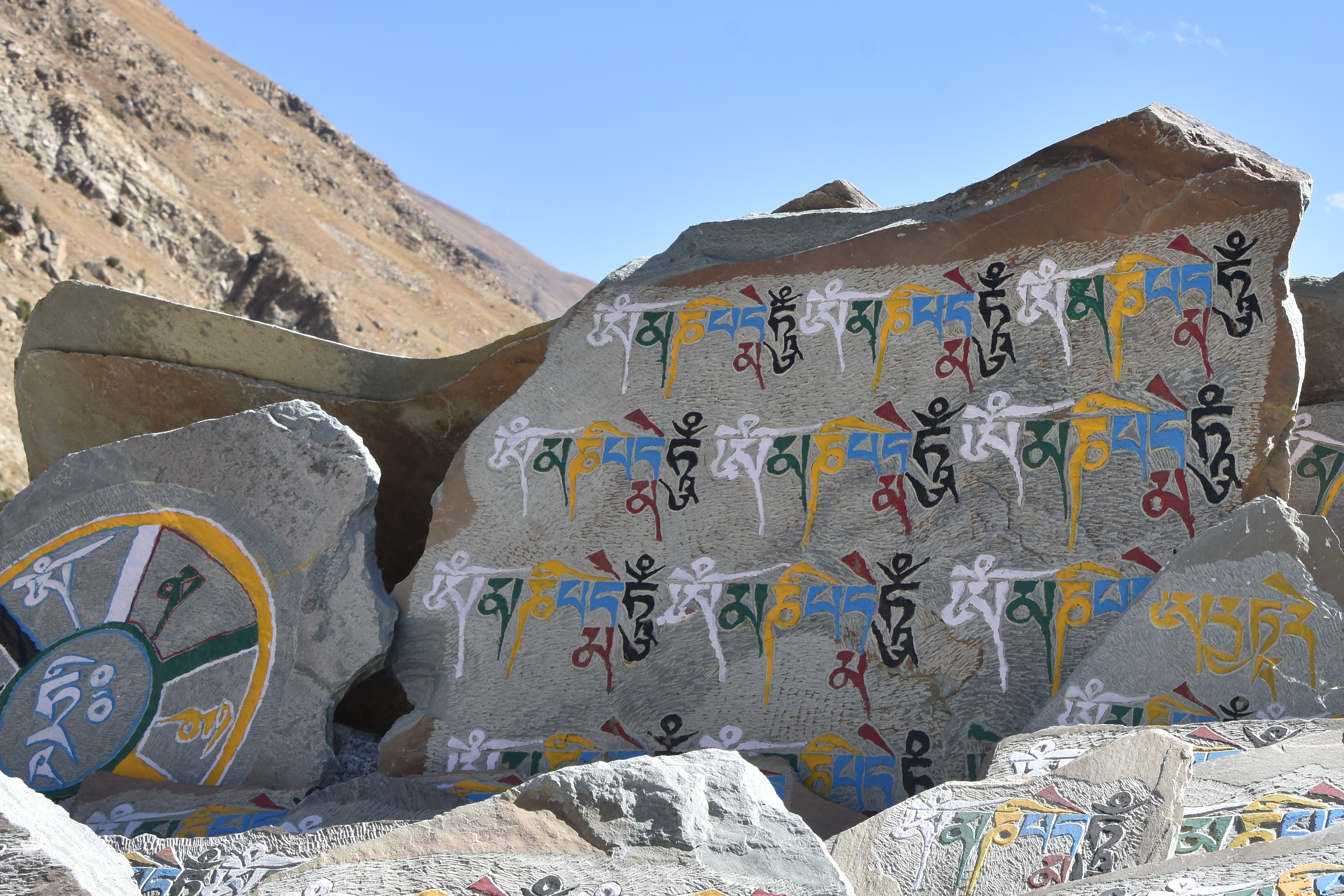
Buddhist prayer stones

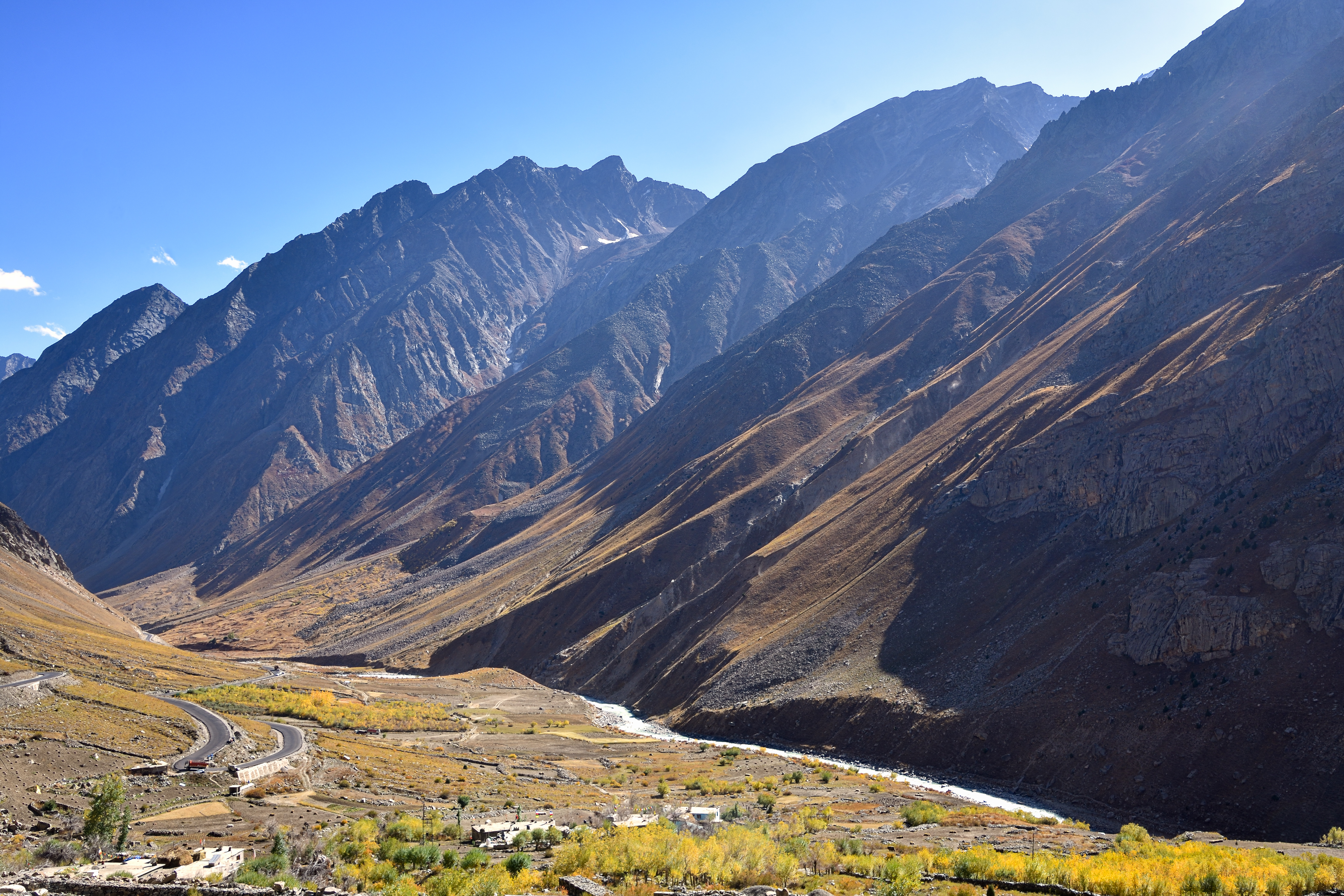
Chikka & Rarik villages, 6 km from the Darcha terminus, Oct '20

== Inter-connectivity ==
- NH1 Srinagar-Leh Highway at Nimmu
- NH301 Padum-Kargil Highway at Padum
- NH3 Leh–Manali Highway at Darcha.
- "Sumdo-Nidder-Rhongo Road" (SNR Road), 64 km long road in Changtang Plateau in Ladakh was completed by December 2023.

== Tourism ==
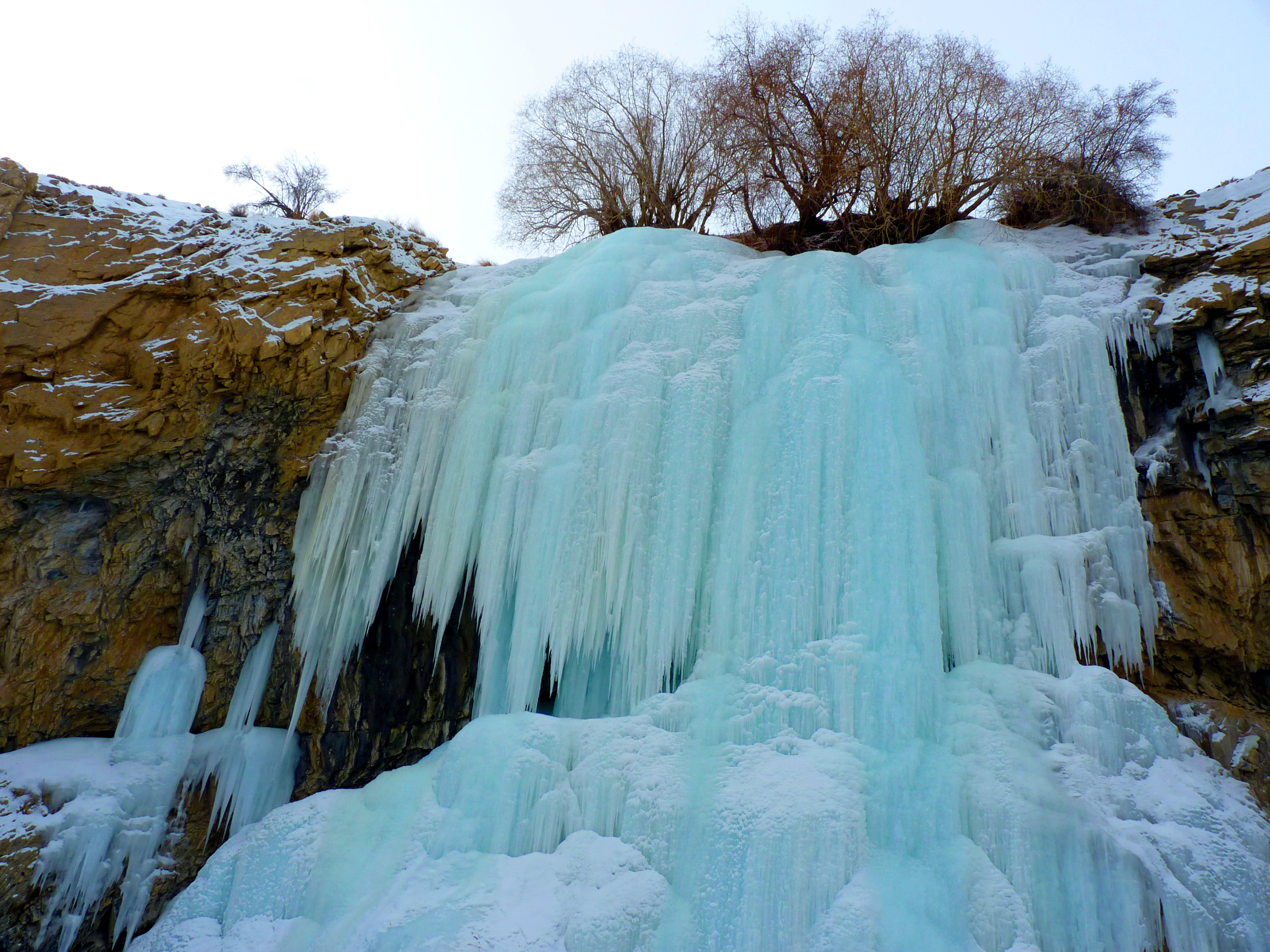
Nerak falls.

NPDR runs past the Hemis National Park. There are several ancient Buddhist monasteries (gompa), such as the Phuktal Monastery.

This road is also the route of famous winter-only Chadar trek (literally "ice sheet"), the 62 km long, 8 day (including acclimatization at Leh) snowy foot trek usually from mid-January and mid-February, which starts and ends at the motorable Shingra Koma, the trek goes to Tsomo Paldar & Tibb cave to Nerak, and then traverse back to Tsomo Paldar.

== Present status ==
- 2025 Nov: Entire route will be completed by 2026, including the fair-weather road over the Shinku La while the construction of all-weather tunnel under the Shinku La will take longer to complete.

== See also ==
- Various highways to Leh and Ladakh
- Leh-Manali Highway
- Shingo La
- Zanskar River
- Phuktal Monastery

== Bibliography ==
- Demenge, Jonathan (2011). The Political Ecology of Road Construction in Ladakh (PDF). University of Sussex.
- Demenge, Jonathan (2013). "The Road to Lingshed: Manufactured Isolation and Experienced Mobility in Ladakh". Himalaya: The Journal of the Association for Nepal and Himalayan Studies. Vol. 32, no. 1. pp. 51–60.
