= Chatra, Republic of Bashkortostan =

Chatra Чатра
- Village
- Location within Bashkortostan Location within Russia
- Coordinates: 54°51′N 54°58′E
- Country: Russia
- Region: Bashkortostan
- District: Blagovarsky District
- Time zone: UTC+5:00

Chatra (Russian: Чатра; Bashkir: Сатра, Satra) is a rural locality (a village) in Tanovsky Selsoviet, Blagovarsky District, Bashkortostan, Russia. The population was 93 as of 2010. There is 1 street.

== Geography ==
Chatra is located 24 km north of Yazykovo (the district's administrative centre) by road. Kyzyl-Chishma is the nearest rural locality.
