= Testa, Zanskar =

Testa Tetha
- village
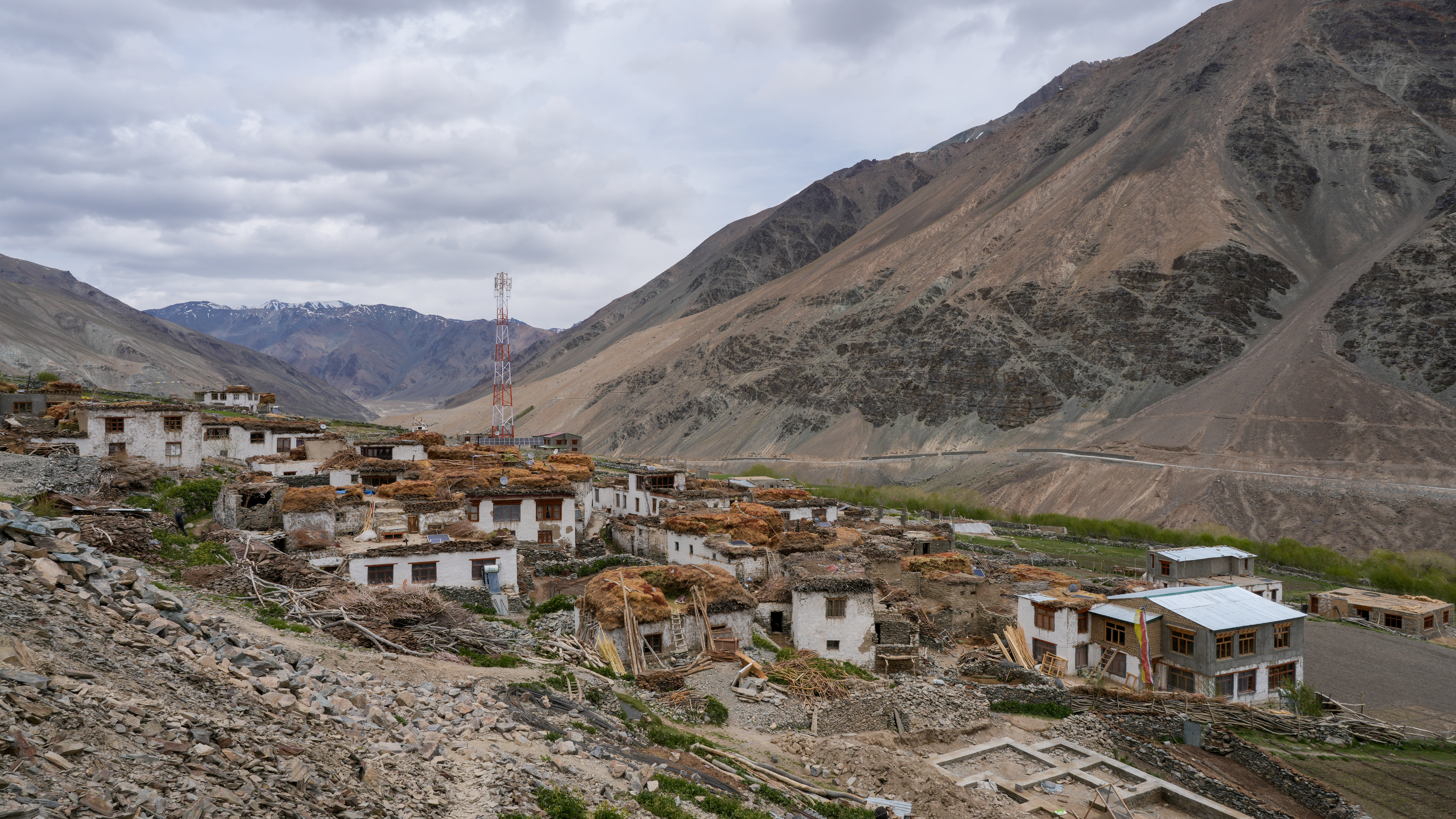
- Testa village from the south

- Location within Ladakh
- Coordinates: 33.1782023°N 77.1666792°E
- Country: India
- Union Territory: Ladakh
- District: Zanskar
- Tehsil: Chah

Area
  - Total: 1.71 km^{2} (0.66 sq mi)
- Elevation: 3,980 m (13,060 ft)

Population (2011)
  - Total: 460
  - Density: 270/km^{2} (700/sq mi)

Languages
- Time zone: UTC+5:30 (IST)
- Postal Index Number: 194302

Testa (also Tetha) is a small village in the Lungnak valley in Chah tehsil, Zanskar district, Ladakh, India. The village is situated on a plateau at the base of a mountain range on the right bank of the Kargiakh River. It is located on a rural road that runs on the right bank opposite the Padum-Darcha road. Testa is 61 km (38 mi) south from Padum.

== Description ==
Testa (elevation 3,980 m (13,060 ft)) is a small village in the Lungnak valley on the left bank of the Kargiakh Chu (river). It is located at a distance of 61 km (38 mi) from Padum on the Padum-Darcha road. The distance from Darcha in Lahaul is 68 km (42 mi), the road climbing over the 5,091 m (16,703 ft) Shinko La pass. Testa village has an area of 170.80 hectares (422.1 acres).

== Demographics ==
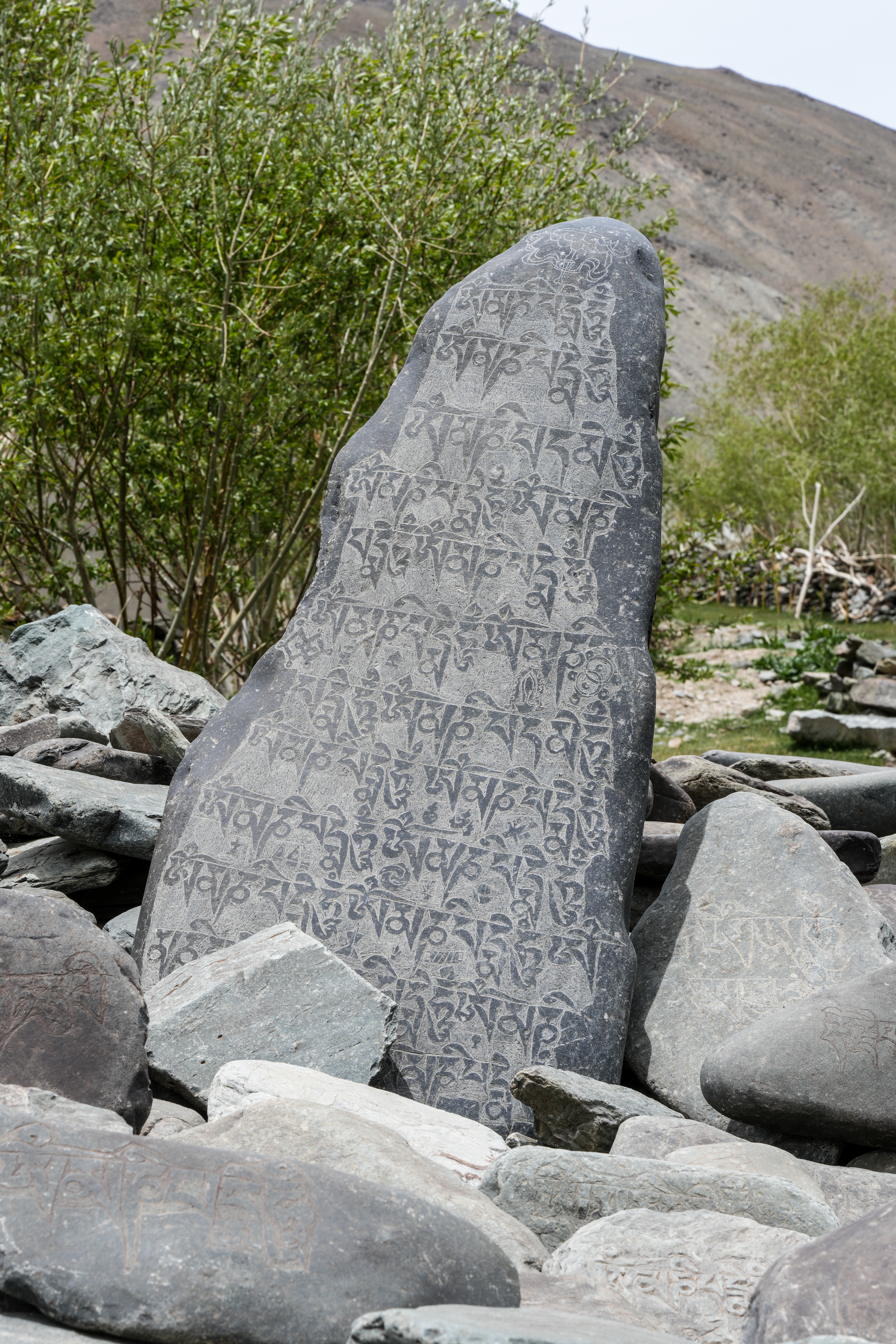
Stone inscribed with Buddhist prayers

The population as of the 2011 Census was 460 with 71 households. Females comprised 48.5% of the population. The literacy rate was 53%. 97.4% of the inhabitants belonged to scheduled tribes. The pre-dominant religion is Buddhism.

== Governance ==
The Testa Gram Panchayat is a government office and local self-government body that governs the villages of Testa and Kargyak. The two villages together have a population of 889 as per the Census 2011.

== Amenities ==
Testa has pre-primary, primary and middle schools. It has a dispensary, it is served by a mobile phone operator and electricity supply is available.

== Economy ==
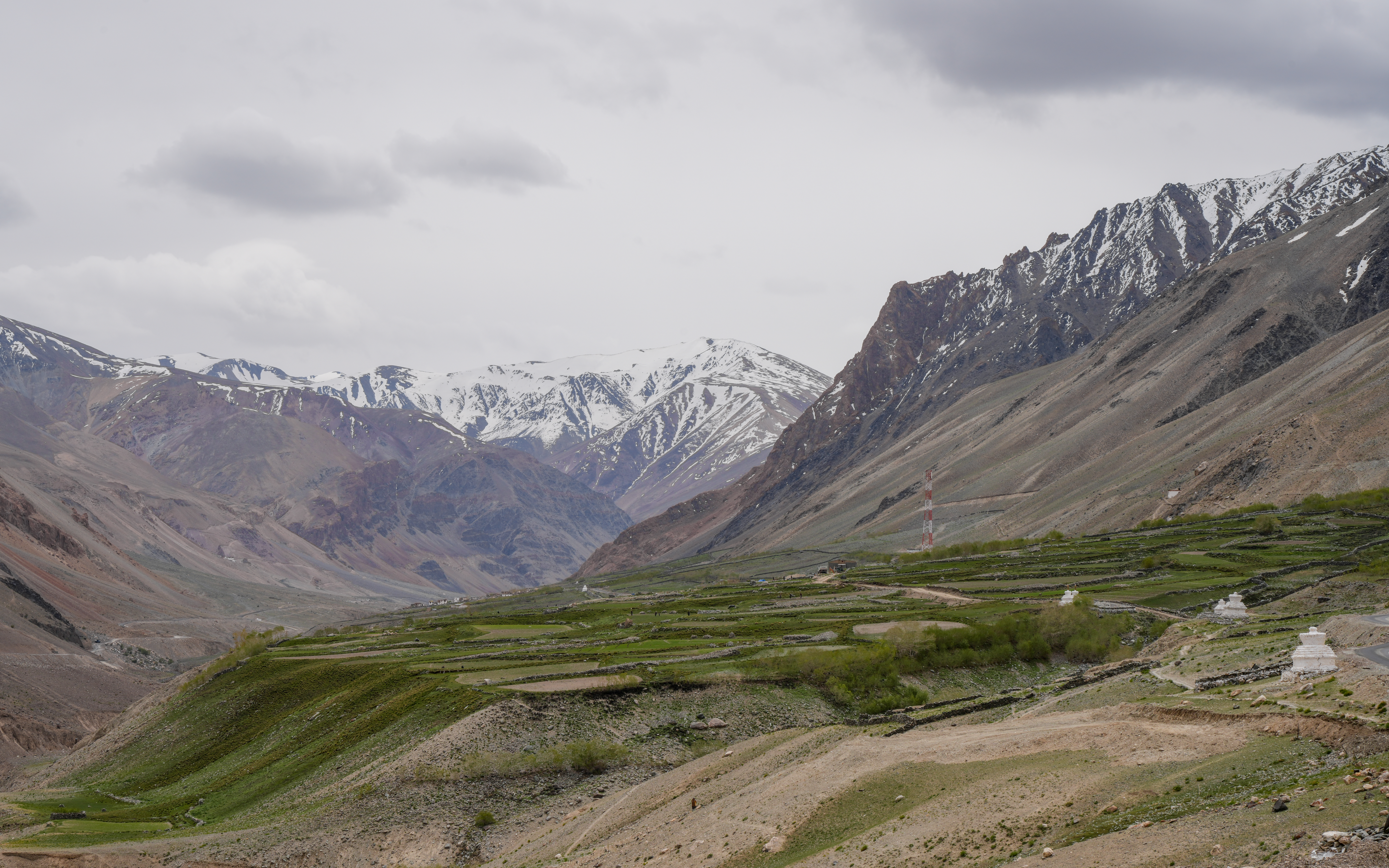
Fields on the Testa plateau, Kargiakh river on the left

The economy is largely agrarian with tourism also providing jobs and income. Annual precipitation is low, fields are irrigated through channels from streams fed by snow-melt. In 2011, 47% of the cultivated land was irrigated.

== Transport ==
In June 2024, the Himachal Road Transport Corporation (HRTC) announced that it would soon commence a bus service from Keylong in Lahaul to Padum. This would run on the Nimmu-Padum-Darcha road and would serve Testa.

== Tourism ==
Testa is a way-point on the popular Darcha-Padum trek. This trek of moderate difficulty takes 9-10 days. It crosses the 5,091 m (16,703 ft) Shinko La pass, then alternates on the left and right sides of the Lungnak valley. A day hike in the middle is a visit to Phuktal Gompa. With the completion of the Darcha-Padum road, this trek has lost its appeal.

== Gallery ==
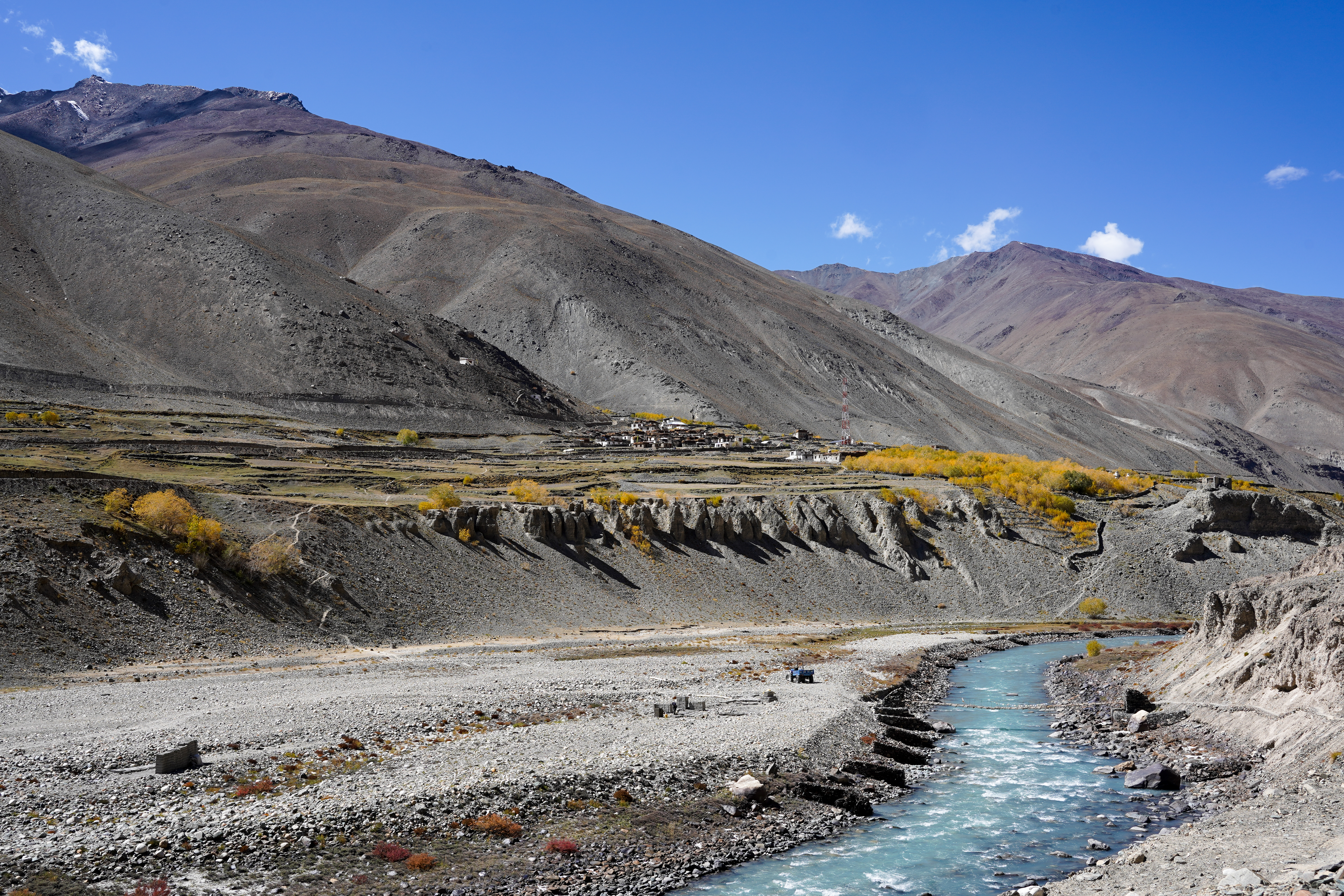
Kargiakh river and Testa plateau from the right bank

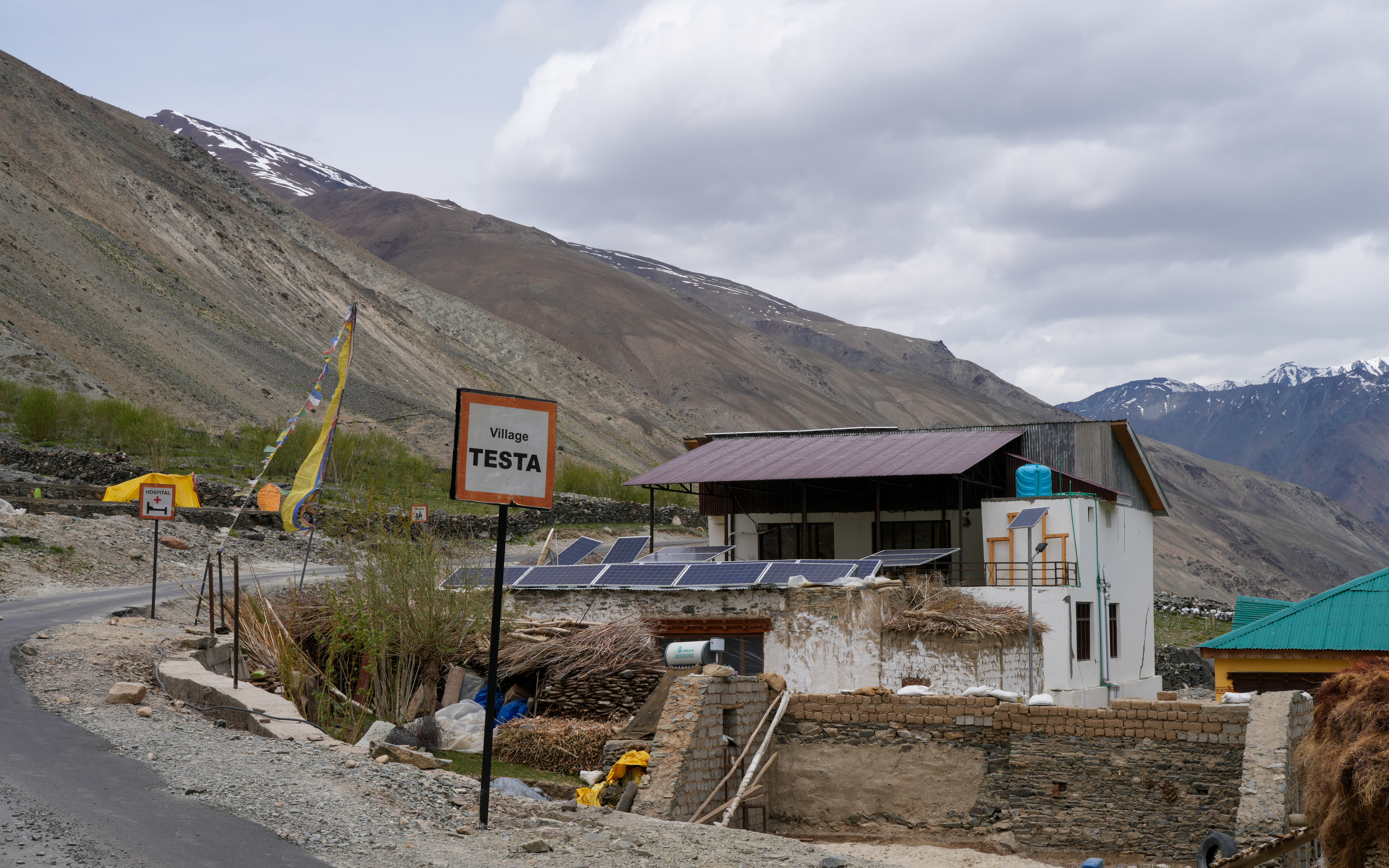
Testa sign on the left bank road

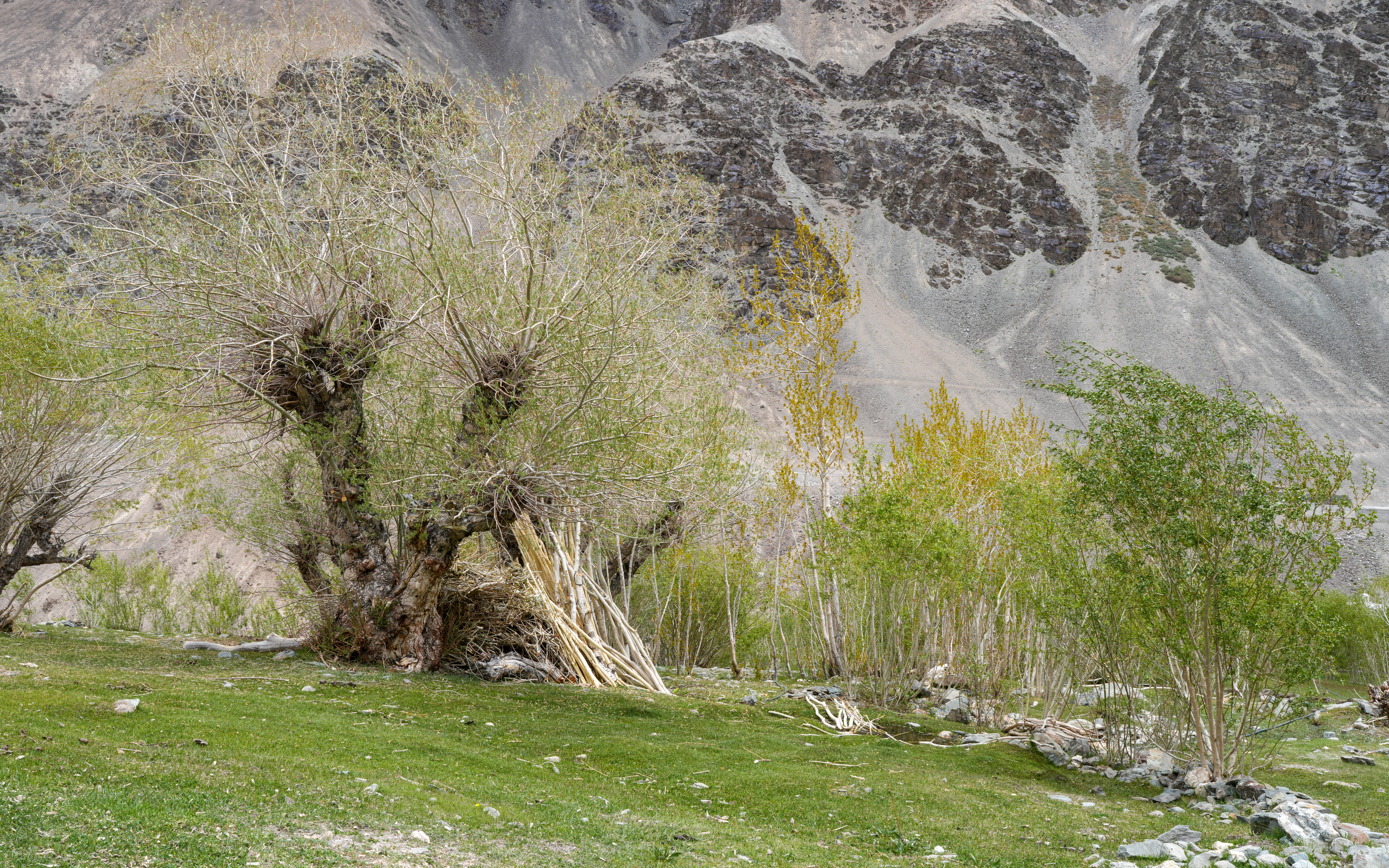
Willow and birch trees

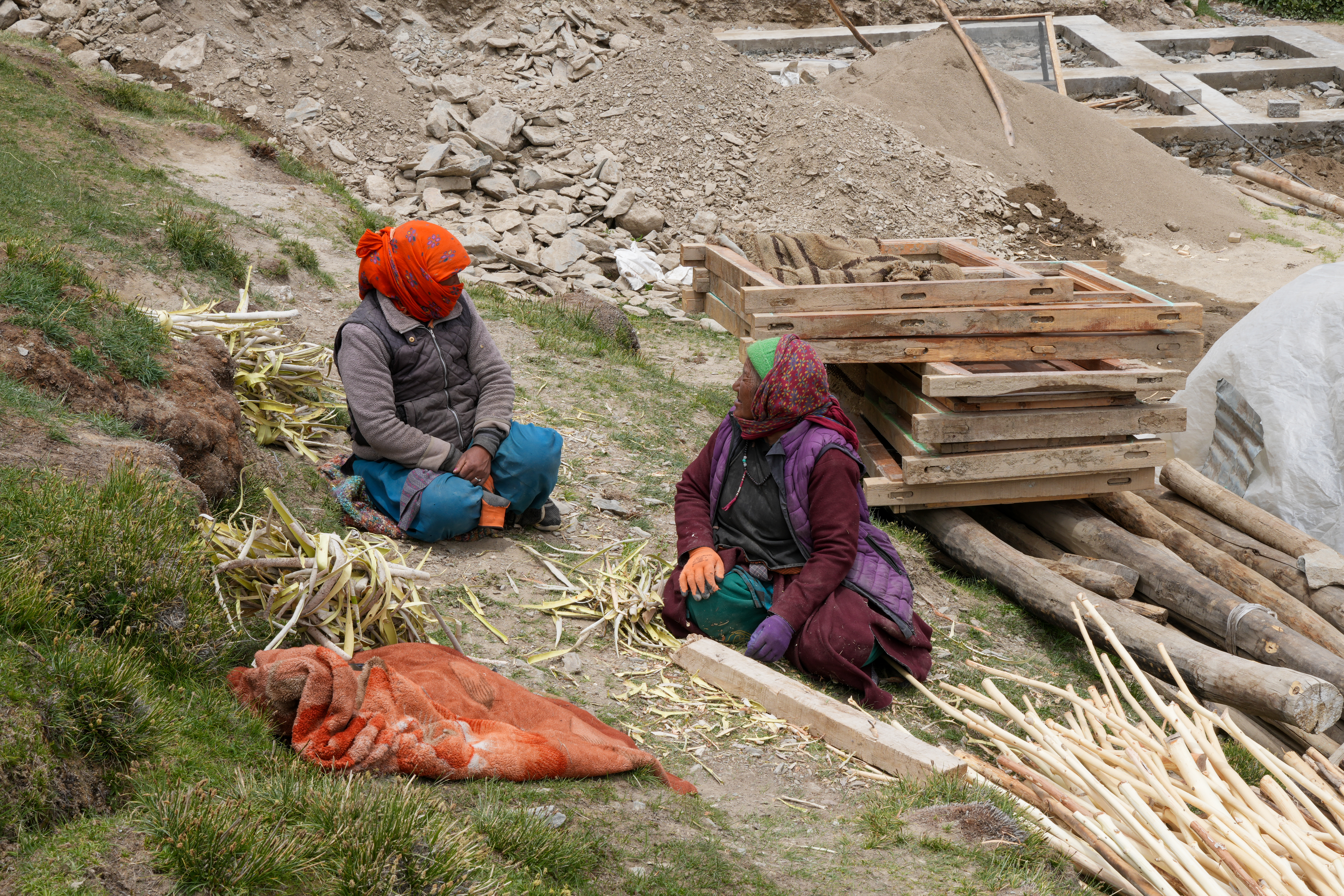
Stripping bark from willow sticks

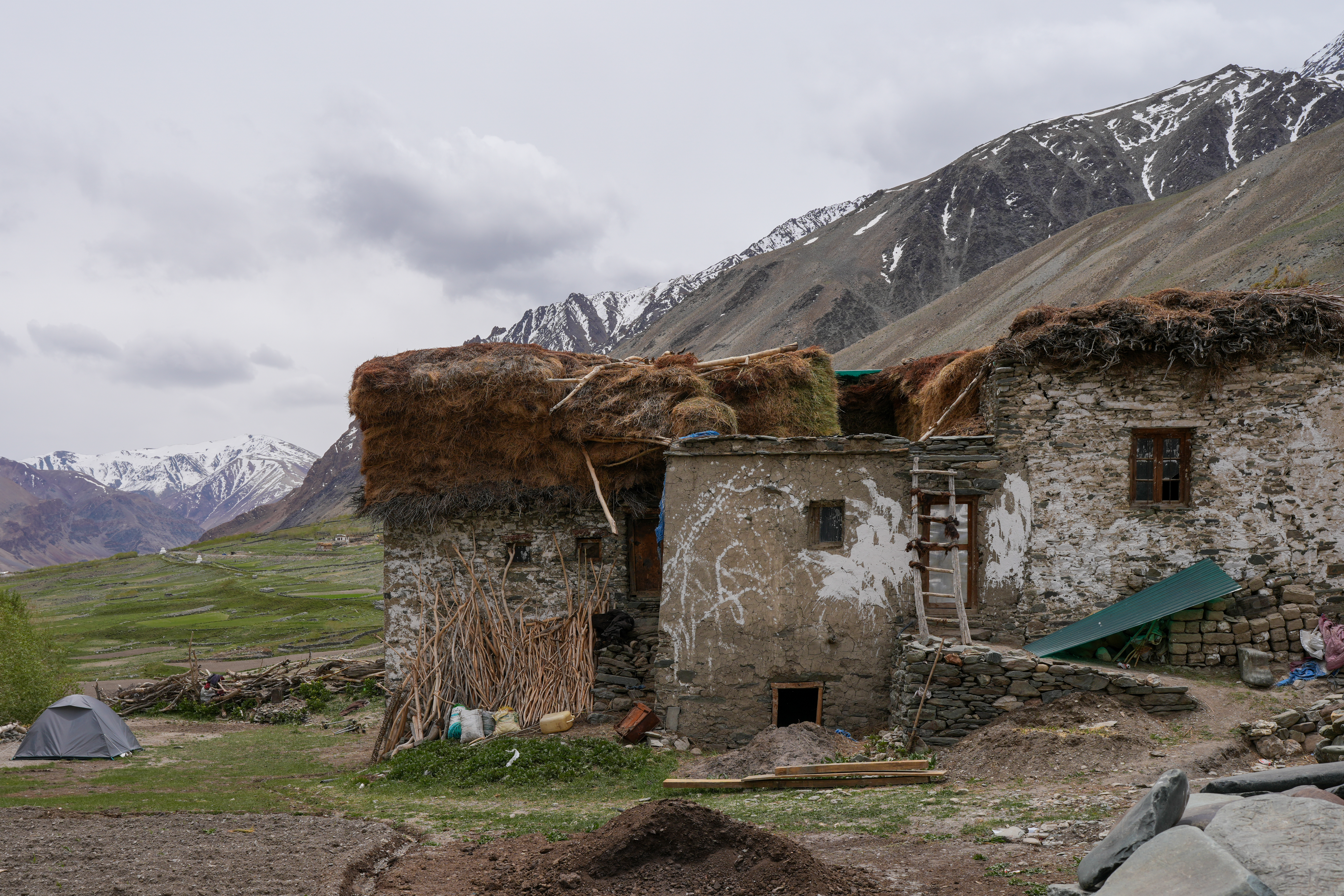
Traditional house

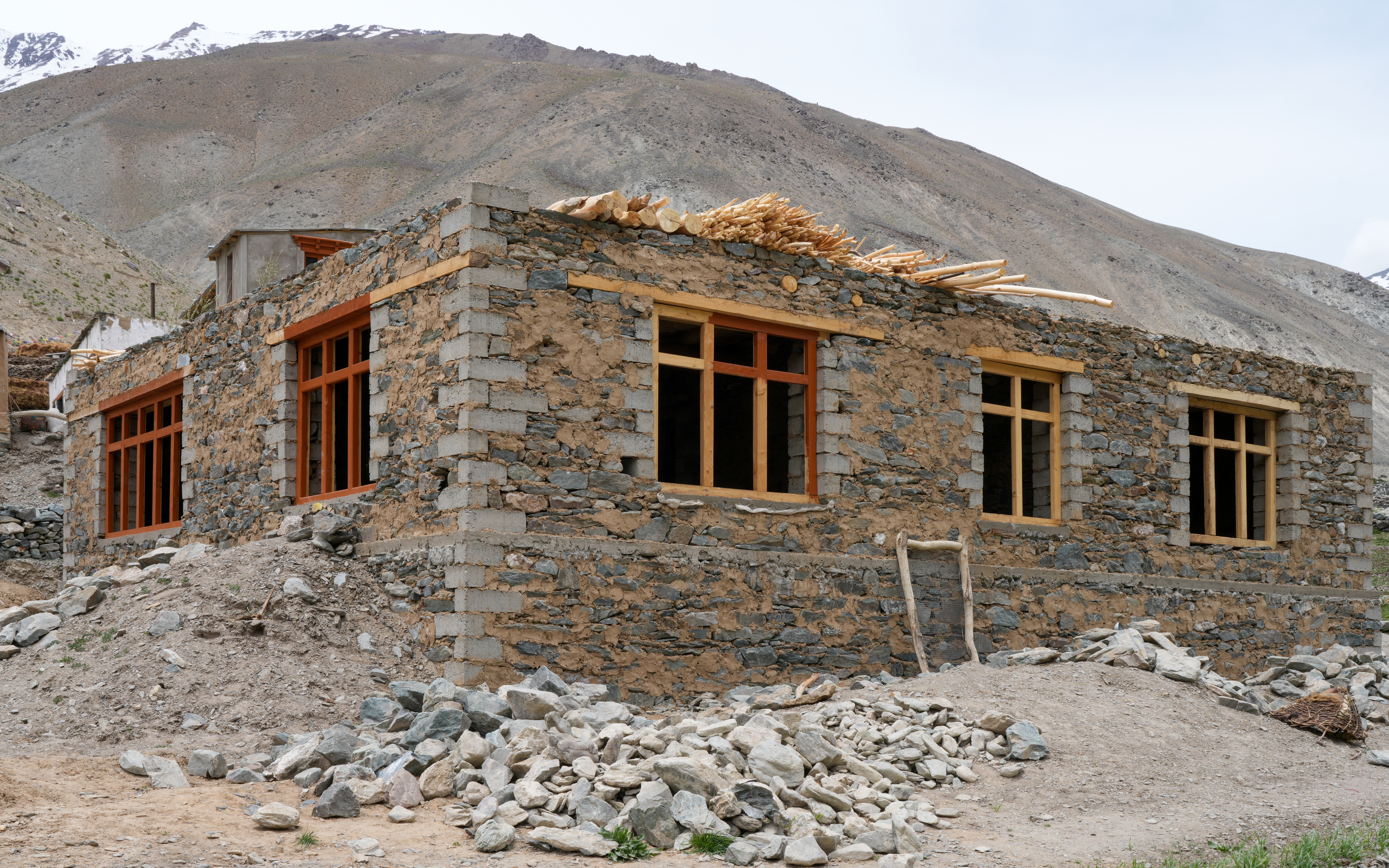
Modern house under construction

== See also ==
- Phugtal Monastery
- List of villages in Kargil district
