= Tsultrim Chonjor =

Indian social worker

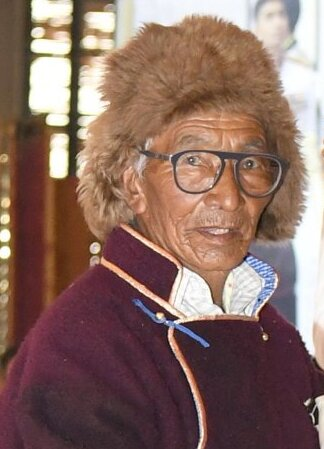
- Born: 1949 (age 76–77); Zanskar, Ladakh, India
- Other names: Chultim Chonjor and Meme Chonjor
- Occupation: Social Worker
- Awards: Padma Shri

Tsultrim Chonjor also known as Chultim Chonjor and Meme Chonjor is an Indian social worker from Stongdey village of Ladakh. The Government of India honoured him with Padma Shri, the fourth highest Indian civilian award in 2021.

== Social work ==
From 1965 to 2000, He worked as Indian government employee in the state handicrafts department. His dissatisfaction with the lack of road connectivity in the region prompted him to take action. Chonjor's social work began, when he started alone the construction of a 38-kilometer road stretch connecting Kargyak village in Ladakh's Zanskar valley to Darcha village in the tribal Lahaul and Spiti district of Himachal Pradesh via Shinku La, in 2014 to 2017. which cost him Rs 57 lakh of his own funds and he even sold his ancestral property to fund the road's construction. His got recognition from the Border Roads Organisation, later they took responsibility for completing the road project.
