= Shinku La =

Mountain pass in India

Shingo La
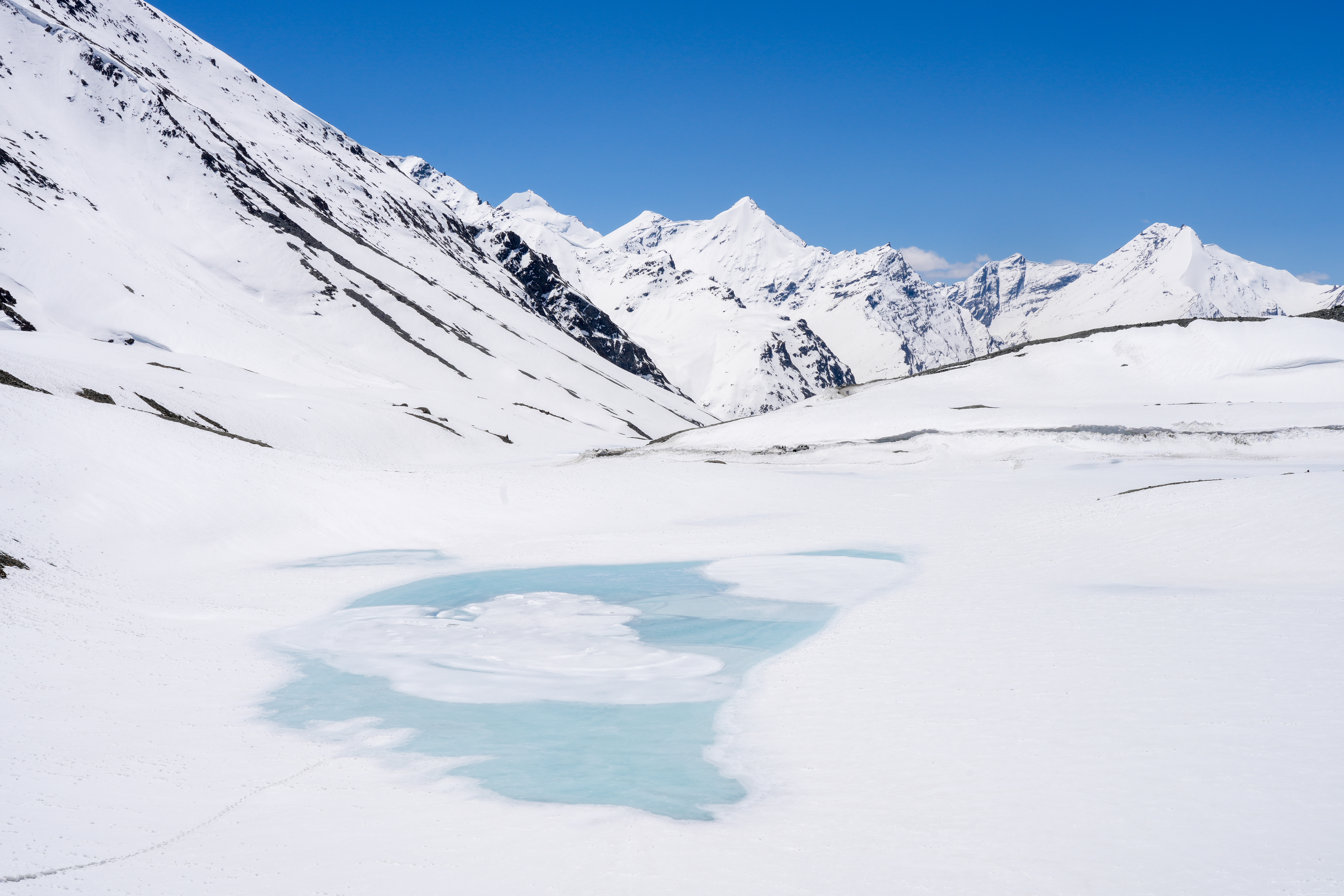
- Frozen lake at Shingo La, view south towards Darcha, Lahaul

- Location within Himachal Pradesh Location within Ladakh
- Interactive map of Shingo La
- Elevation: 5,091 metres (16,703 ft)

Third Approach
- Location: Himachal Pradesh, India
- Range: Himalaya
- Coordinates: 32°54′32″N 77°11′59″E

Shinku La (or Shingo La) mountain pass on Nimmu-Padum-Darcha road on the state boundary between Ladakh and Himachal Pradesh, connects the Zanskar region of Ladakh with the Lahaul region of Himachal Pradesh. The under-construction Shingo La Tunnel, with target expected completion date of 2028, will reduce the Manali to Kargil distance by 522 km while providing an additional all-weather route to Ladakh as an alternative to the existing Leh–Manali Highway.

== Geography ==
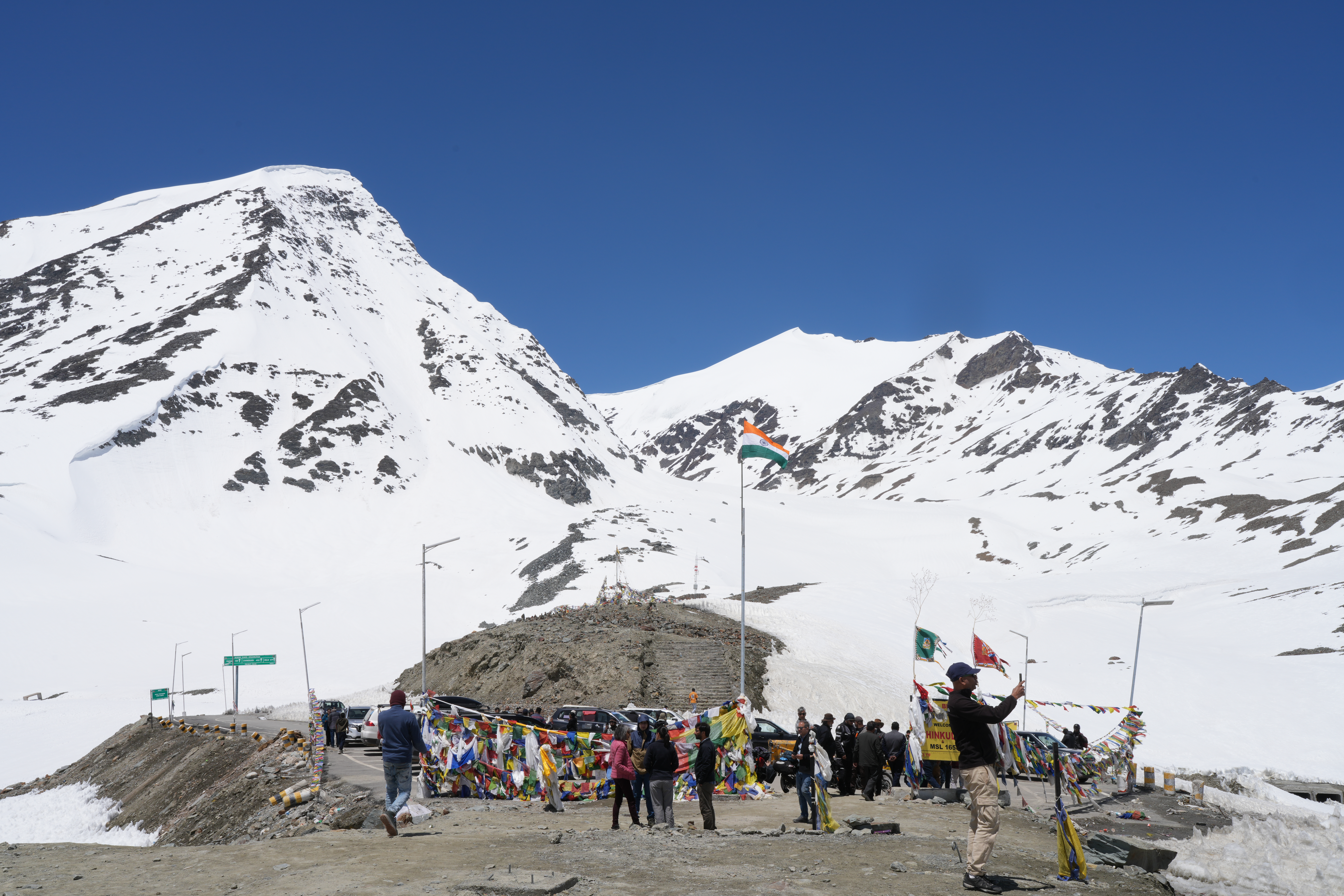
Travellers at the pass in June 2024. Lahaul on the left, Zanskar on the right.

The Sinkula Pass, traversed by a 10-day Zanskar-Lahaul footpath used by locals and trekkers, features Sinkula Lake, a shallow pool 20m below its summit on the southern side. Acclaimed as one of the Indian Himalaya's technically easiest 5,000m+ passes (no glaciers or steep climbs), it is typically snowbound October–April and avalanche-prone. While an official sign states 16,615.5 ft, trekking websites list elevations from 4,900-5,100m.

On the south side of the pass, the route from Barsi Bridge near Darcha Sumdol on NH-3 goes northwest via Rarig, Chikka-Be, Palamo buddhist monastery, Shinkunla Camp, Zanskar Sumdo, and past Green Tara Tal lake. "Mount Shinkun East" (6081 m) and "Mount Shinkun West" (6127 m) lie respectively to the east and west side of the pass, among these the Mount Shinkun West was summited by mountaineers in 2004.

The route on the north side of the pass, along the Kurgiak Cho stream, has the Shunkula Upper Gompa, and then the "Sumdo Shinkula North" which is a confluence of two glaciers (Sumdo means confluence in Tibetan language). Further north are the "Lakhong" camping ground, and then the "Phuktal" camping ground near Gonbo Rangjon peak (also called Gumbok Rangan) which is a stand-alone lofty rocky precipice south of Kargyak village in the Lungnak valley considered to holy peak referred to as God's Mountain by the natives who practice Tibetan Buddhism. Further north are the "Phersayla" camp site, and then the confluence of "Kurgiak Cho" and Tsarap River where the route forks into two with the west route going to Padum and the east route going to Chah, Darcha and Phutkar Gompa (Phugtal Monastery).

== Road ==
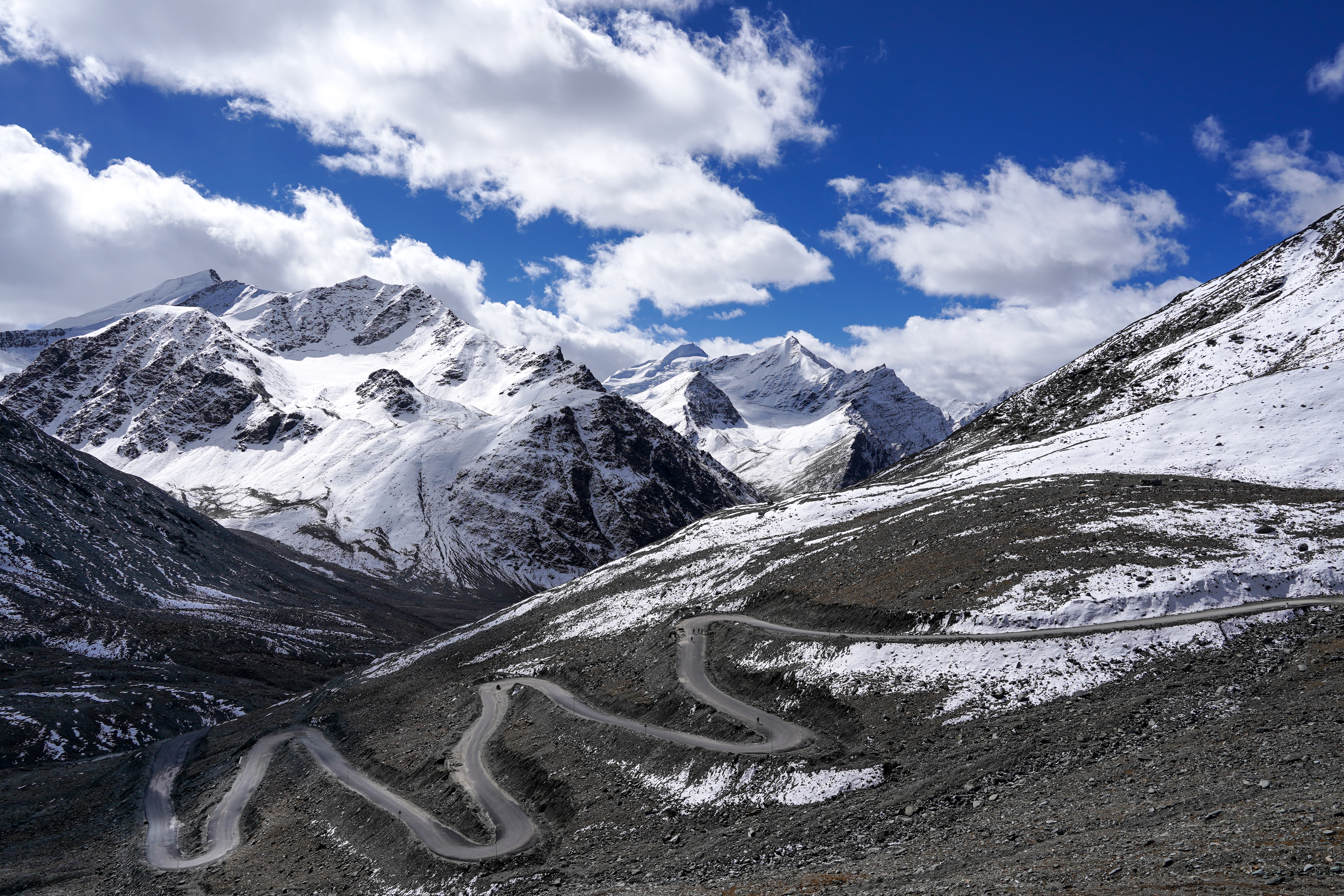
The road from Shingo La to Darcha, Lahaul.

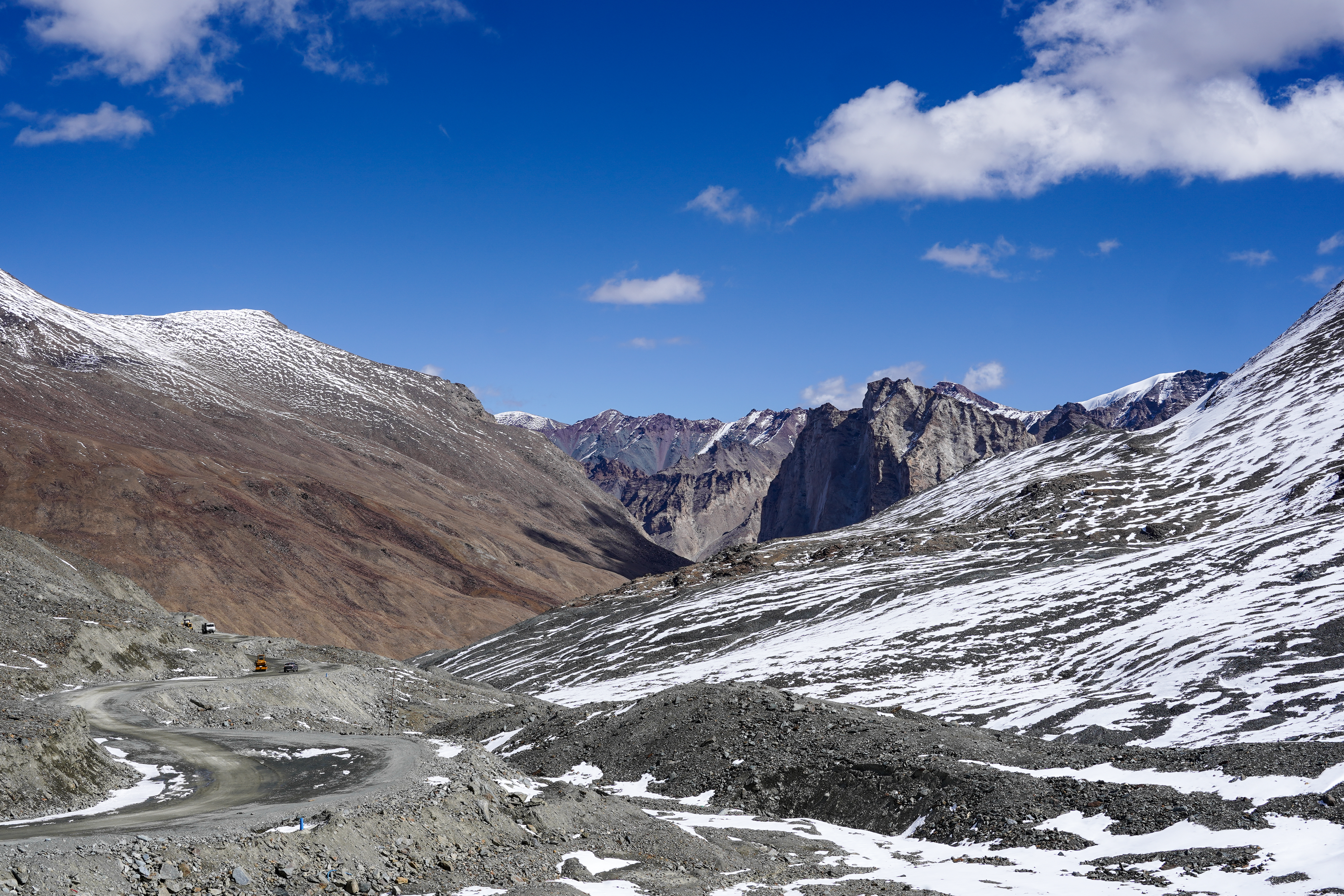
The road from Shingo La to Padum, Zanskar.

A road connecting Darcha with Padum across the Shingo La pass was first conceived in after the Kargil conflict of 1999, and preliminary work began in 2002. The project was given approval in 2004 and completion was expected by 2012.

A 38 km long rudimentary road from Ramjak in Lahaul to Kargyakh in Zanskar via the Shingo La was first constructed between May 2014 and June 2017 by Tsultrim Chonjor (also called "Meme Chonjor"), a retired government employee from Zanskar with his own funds and help from local villagers. He had tried to persuade the government to construct the road, and decided to build it himself when he failed to convince them; he was awarded the Padma Shri in 2021 for it. The road was later taken over by the Border Roads Organisation (BRO), and black-topped. The new metalled road has a capacity to carry truck loads of over 18 tonnes. A minibus service for Padum using the road was started by the Himachal Road Transport Corporation (HRTC). The BRO is turning the road into a double laned one, and is planning to construct a tunnel under the pass for all-weather connectivity. The organisation is also attempting to keep the road open during the winter months.

== Shinku La tunnel ==
Shinku La Tunnel is an under-construction 4.1-kilometre-long (2.5 mi) long twin-tube tunnel on the Nimmu–Padum–Darcha road, with a projected cost of ₹1,681 crores. Its north portal will be in Zanskar's Padum Valley in Ladakh and south portal in Himachal Pradesh. It is being constructed under BRO's "Project Yojak" and will have two unidirectional tubes, each with 2 lanes, for a total of 4 lanes. This tunnel, which will cut Manali-Leh distance by 60 km and facilitate the transportation of heavy machinery to Kargil and Siachen, will provide all-weather access to 15 remote villages of Zanskar Valley and the India-China border that are cut off during winter, thus improving the economy and tourism value of Zanskar Valley while providing crucial year-round strategic border access to the defense forces of India. The tunnel will have longitudinal ventilation using banana fans, which require minimal electricity and lower operational costs. With the completion of this Tunnel, Nimmu–Padum–Darcha Road will become an all-weather road. See also Tunnels in North West India.

=== Status ===
Conceived in 2006, the project was forgotten until it was revived in 2020. Since then the project has seen many false starts, resulting in the earlier expected completion date of 2025 moving to August 2028 with actual construction finally beginning in May 2025.

2009: Tenders floated, but no progress was made.

2020: Indian government has approved preparation of a detailed project report (DPR).

2021: length was reduced to a new shorter 4.25-kilometer-long alignment to be built as part of BRO's "Project Yojak", This plan did not materialise.

2023 Feb: the Union Cabinet approved the funding of ₹1,681 crores.

2024 July: Foundation stone for commencement of construction laid by the Prime Minister Narendra Modi and construction work began on 26 July 2024 with the target completion date of August 2028. Round-the-clock excavation with tunnel boring machines commenced from both the North Portal (Lakhang in Ladakh) and the South Portal (Darcha in Himachal Pradesh).

2025 Nov: Work was in progress from both portals, completion will be by August 2028.

2026 May: Tunnel boring is 50% complete, and progress is on track for completion in August 2028. Darcha-to-Shinku La approach road is over 90% complete, and the Padum-to-Shinku La approach road is 50% complete pending deep formation cutting.

== See also ==
- Atal Tunnel
- Victory Tunnel
- India–China Border Roads
- Leh Manali road
- Nimmu–Padam–Darcha road
