= Kargyak =

Kargyak Kargiakh
- village
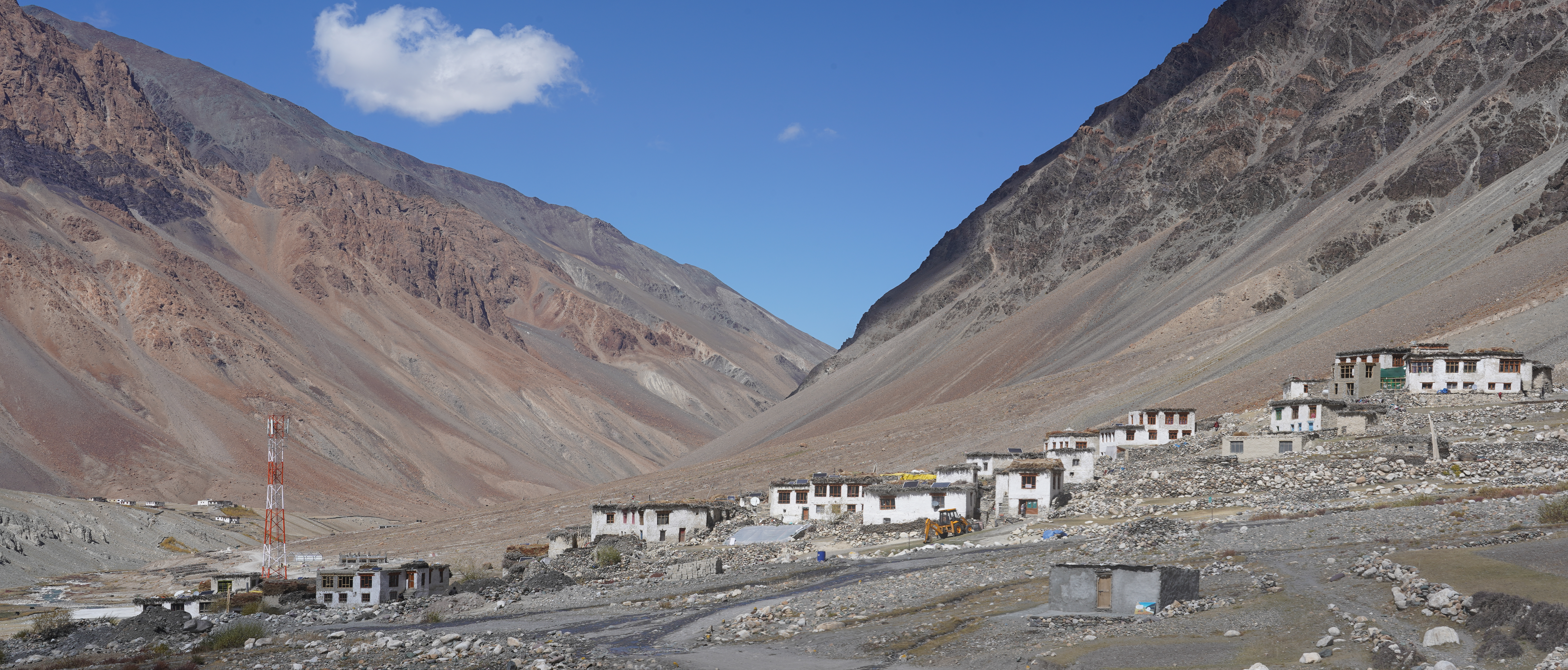
- Kargyak from the south

- Location within Ladakh
- Coordinates: 33.0636558°N 77.2268041°E
- Country: India
- Union Territory: Ladakh
- District: Zanskar
- Tehsil: Chah

Area
  - Total: 1.764 km^{2} (0.681 sq mi)
- Elevation: 4,120 m (13,520 ft)

Population (2011)
  - Total: 429
  - Density: 243/km^{2} (630/sq mi)

Languages
- Time zone: UTC+5:30 (IST)

Kargyak (also Kargiakh, Kurgiakh) is a small village in the Lungnak valley in Chah tehsil, Zanskar district, Ladakh, India. The village is situated on the right bank of the Kargiakh Chu (river) about 77 km (48 mi) south of Padum on the Padum-Darcha highway (NPD road). The economy is largely agrarian and the main religion is Buddhism.

== Description ==
Kargyak (elevation 4,120 m (13,520 ft)) is a small village in the Lungnak valley on the right bank of the Kargiakh Chu (river). It is located at a distance of 77 km (48 mi) from Padum on the Padum-Darcha road. The distance from Darcha in Lahaul is 63.5 km (39.5 mi), the road climbing over the 5,091 m (16,703 ft) Shinko La pass. Kargyak village has an area of 176.40 hectares (435.9 acres).

== Demographics ==
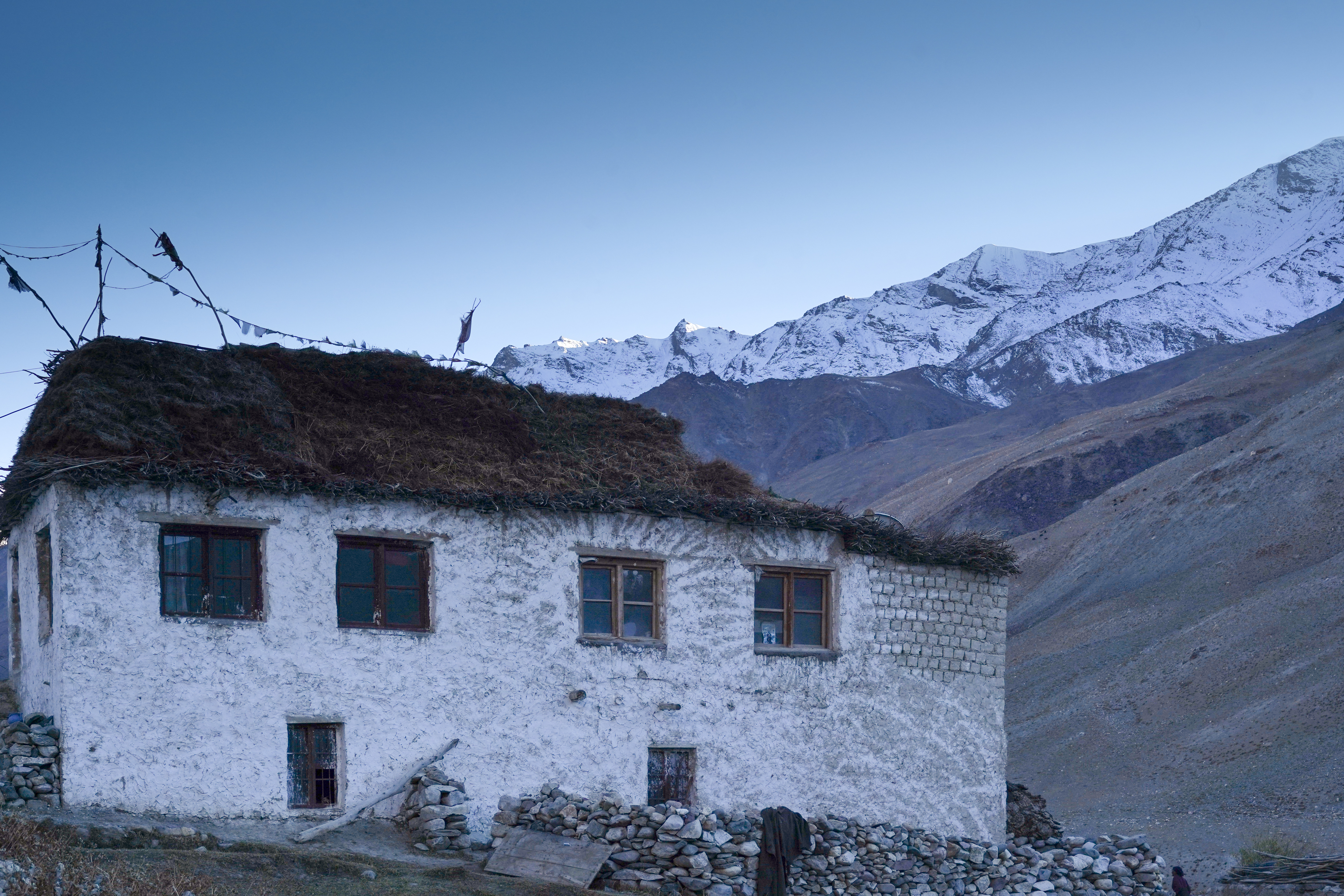
Traditional house

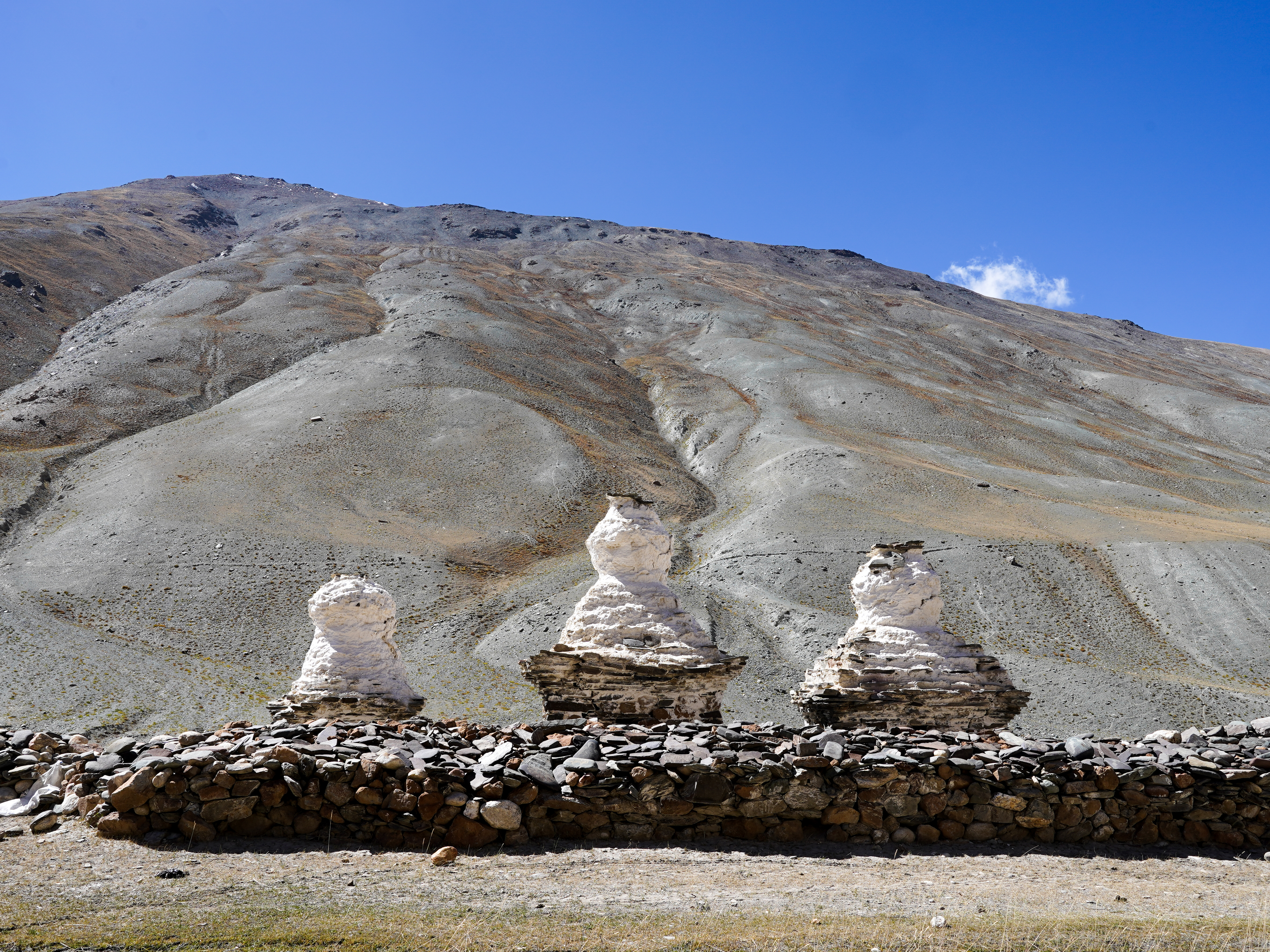
Buddhist chortens near Kargyak

As per the 2011 Census, Kargyak had 74 households with a population of 429. Females comprised 49.4% of the population. The literacy rate was 40.6%. 98.8% of the population belonged to scheduled tribes. The pre-dominant religion is Buddhism.

== Governance ==
Kargyak village comes under the Testa Gram Panchayat local self-government body.

== Amenities ==
Kargyak has a pre-primary and primary school. There is mobile phone service and electricity supply. Piped water supply is provided from springs through canals.

== Fauna and flora ==
W.N. Koelz trekked through Kargyak in July 1933. He found herds of yak and a few horses. He reported that there were few birds. He sighted many horned larks and Tibetan pigeons. Other birds included snow pigeons, lammergeiers, red-capped linnets and black and white finches. Wild flowers included geranium, columbine, buttercup, two species of pedicularis among others.

== Economy ==
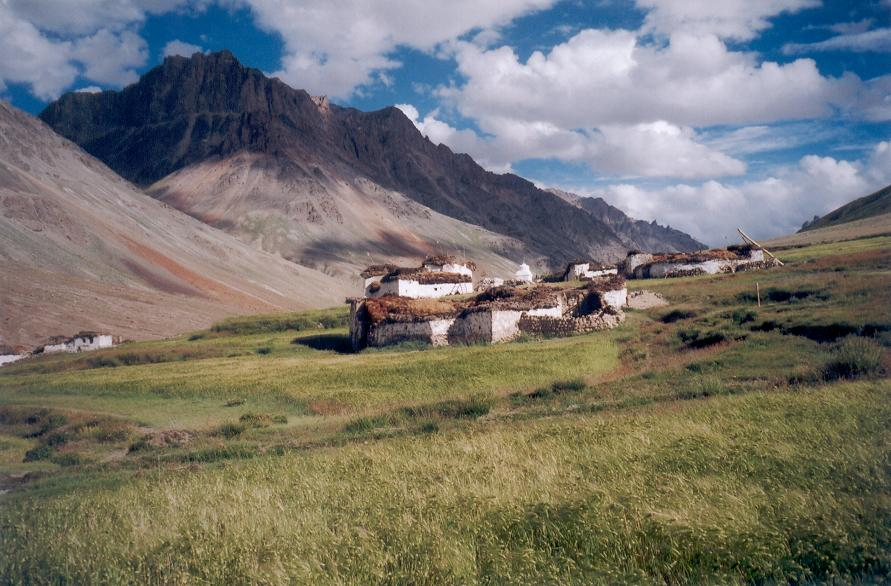
Fields ready for harvest in September

The economy is largely agrarian. On a trek in July 1933, W.N. Koelz reported that barley was being cultivated. He found the valley was green with rich plant growth due to several springs and streams. With low annual precipitation, irrigation through channels from streams fed by snow-melt is used. In 2011, 35.8% of the cultivated land was irrigated.

== Transport ==
The village is served by public/private buses.

== Tourism ==
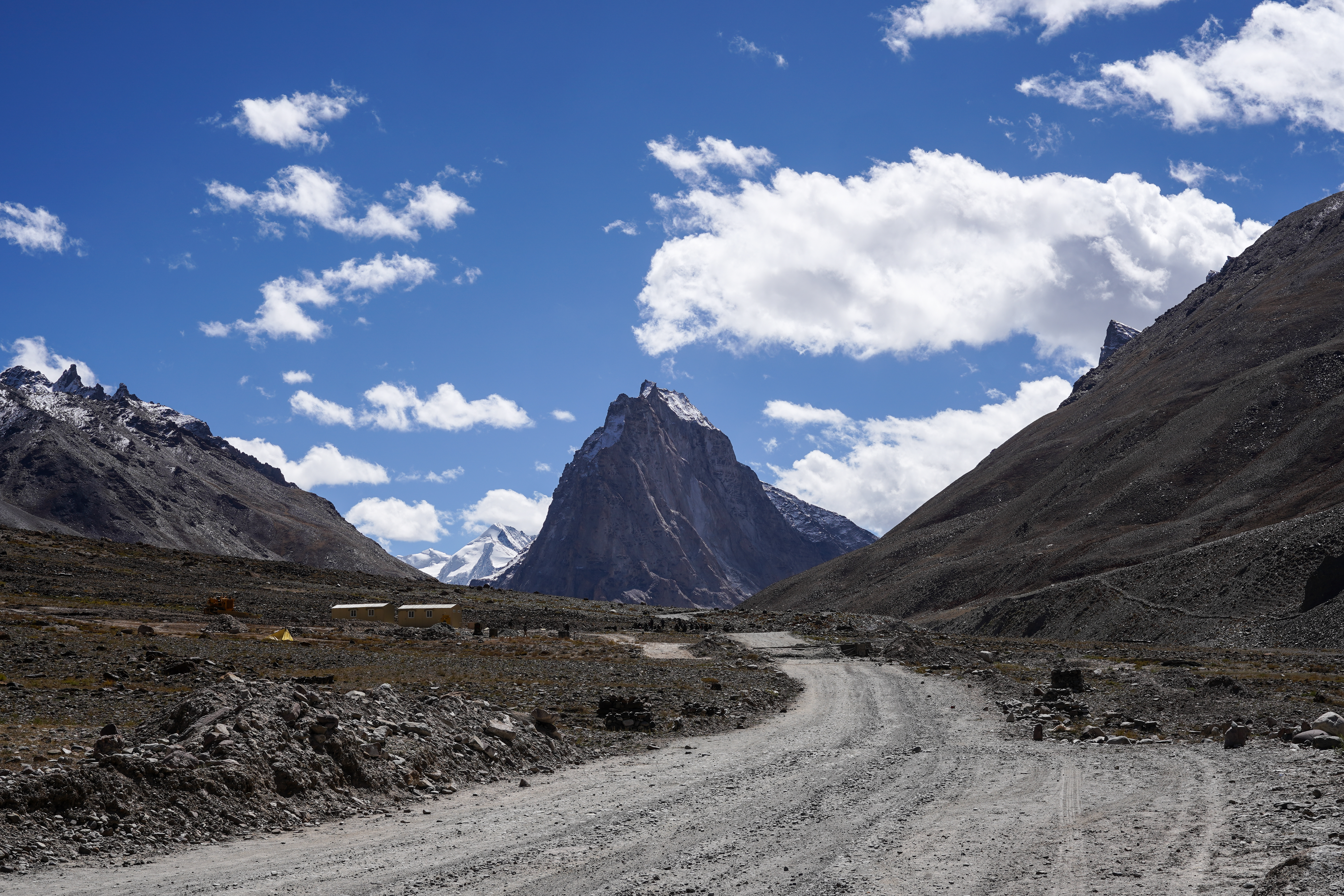
NPD road from Kargyak towards Gumbok Rangan

Kargyak is a popular way point on the Darcha - Padum trekking route as it is the first village in Zanskar after crossing Shinko La. The spectacular Gumbok Rangan peak is located 12 km (7.5 mi) south of Kargyak. Several tent campsites cater to trekkers, bikers and motorists.

== See also ==
- Gumbok Rangan
