= Gonbo Rangjon =

Rocky precipice south of Kargyak village in India

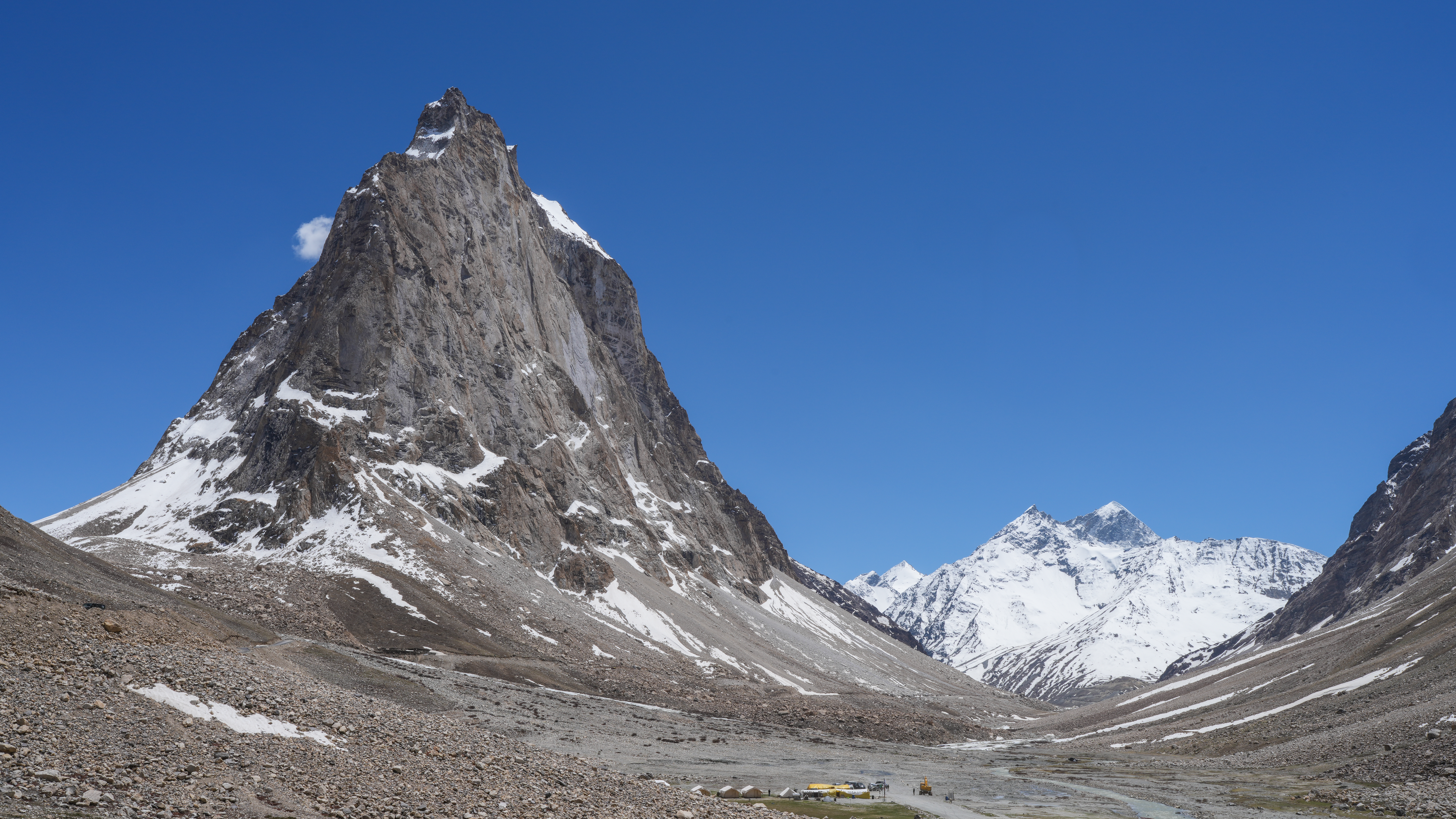
- Mt. Gonbo Rangjon

Highest point
- Elevation: 5,520 m (18,110 ft)
- Coordinates: 32.9585°N 77.2486°E

Geography
- Location: Ladakh, India

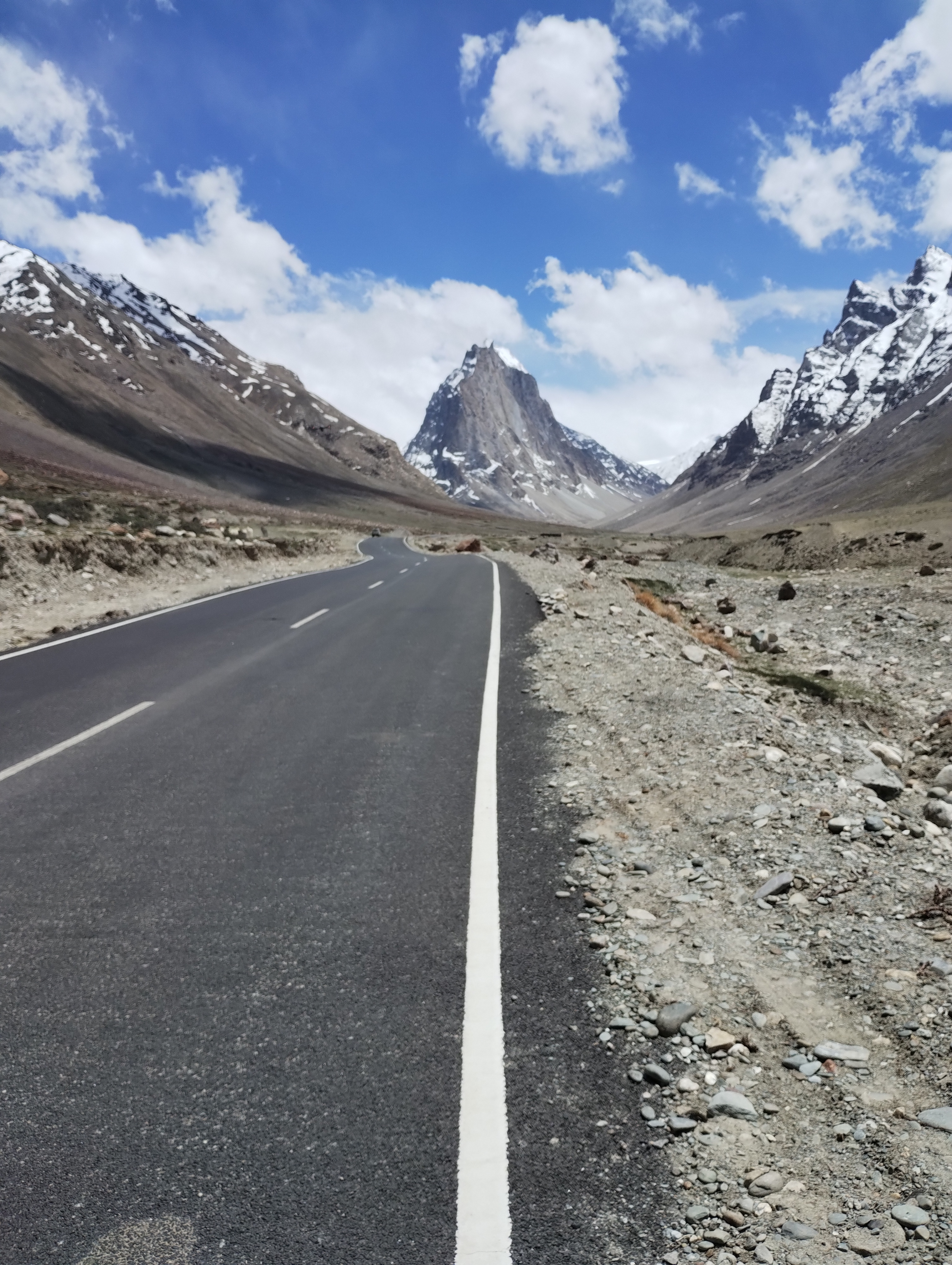
Gonbo Rangjon in the Lungnak Valley of Zanskar.

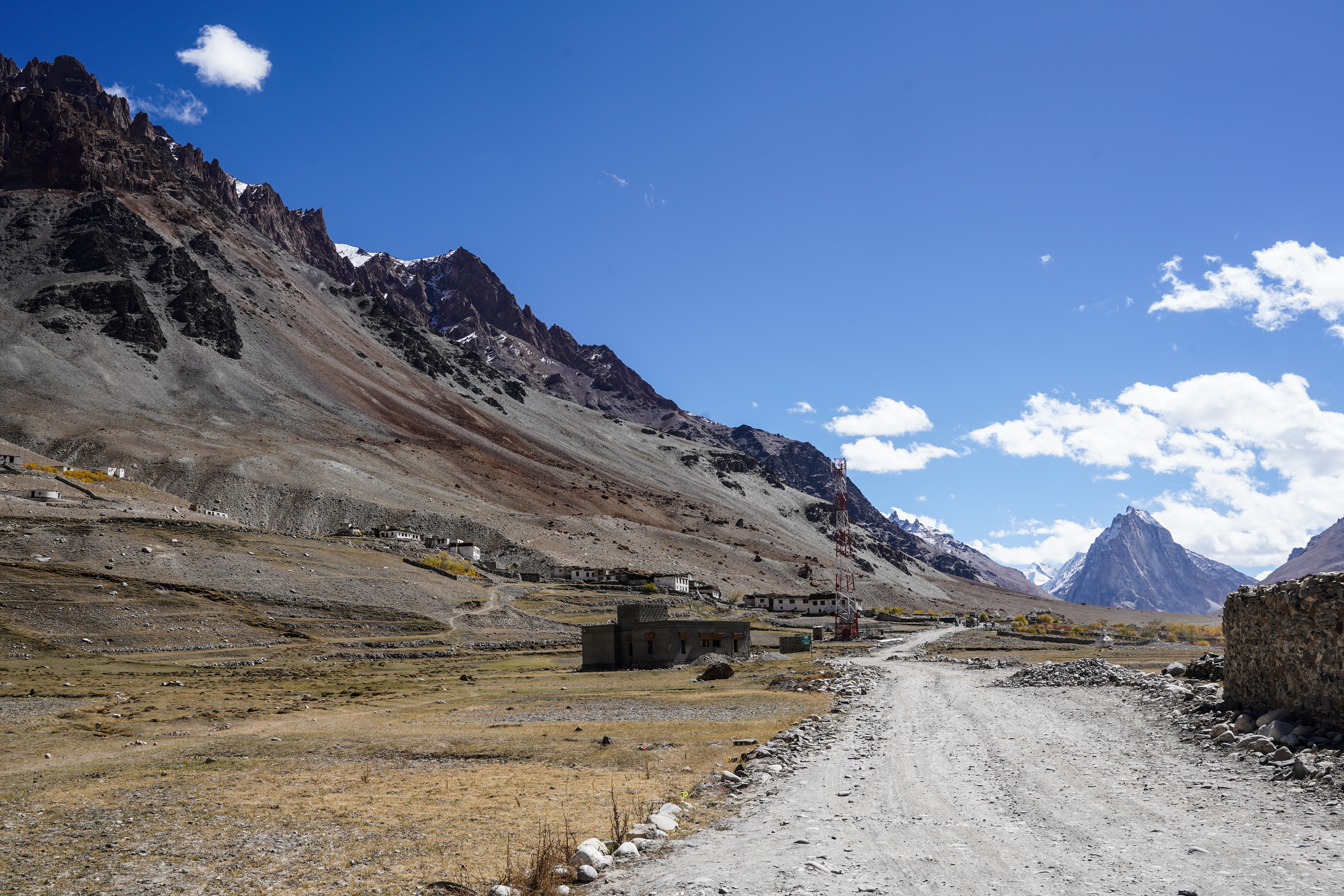
Gonbo Rangjon viewed from Kargyak.

Gonbo Rangjon(Tibetan: གོང་པོ་རང་འབྱོམ་, Wylie: gong po rang’byon) is a standalone mountain peak in the Lungnak Valley of Ladakh, India. It is part of the greater Zanskar Range, which is itself a part of the Himalayas. It is considered holy and referred to as "God's Mountain" by the local inhabitants, who practice Tibetan Buddhism. The name translates to "Throne of Gonbo", as it is believed by locals and pilgrims alike to be the residence of Gonbo, a manifestation of the Buddhist deity Mahakala.

Gonbo Rangjon lies along the Darcha – Padum trek route and the Darcha – Padum road. Gonbo Rangjon can be seen from the village of Kargyak, which is about 16 km (9.9 mi) to the north. The peak is at 5,520 m (18,110 ft) and the base of the mountain is about 4,500 m (14,800 ft).
