= Stongdey =

Stongdey Tongdey
- Village
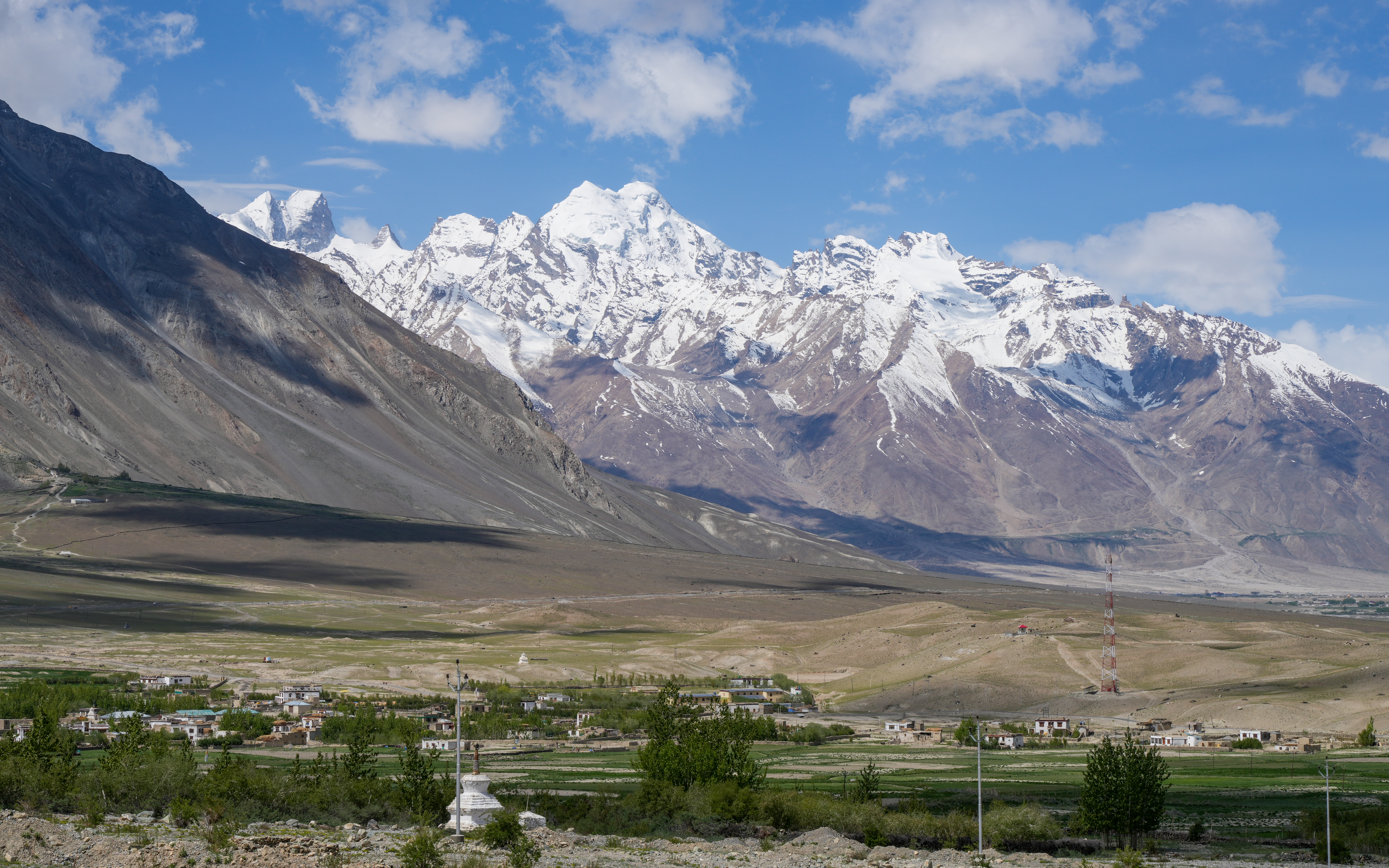
- Stongdey from the northeast

- Location within Ladakh
- Coordinates: 33°31′4″N 76°58′25″E
- Country: India
- State: Ladakh
- District: Zanskar
- Tehsil: Lungnak

Area
  - Total: 2.566 km^{2} (0.991 sq mi)
- Elevation: 3,530 m (11,580 ft)

Population (2011)
  - Total: 914
  - Density: 356/km^{2} (923/sq mi)

Languages
- Time zone: UTC+5:30 (IST)
- Website: https://kargil.nic.in/
- Census 2011 area and population includes both Stongdey and Kumik villages

Stongdey (also Stongde, Stongday, Tongde, Tongdey, Tangday) is a small village in the Zanskar valley in Lungnak tehsil, Zanskar district, Ladakh, India. The village is situated on the right bank of the Zanskar River about 18 km (11 mi) northeast of Padum on the Padum-Nimmu highway. This article also contains information about the neighbouring Kumik (Khumi) village.

== Geography ==
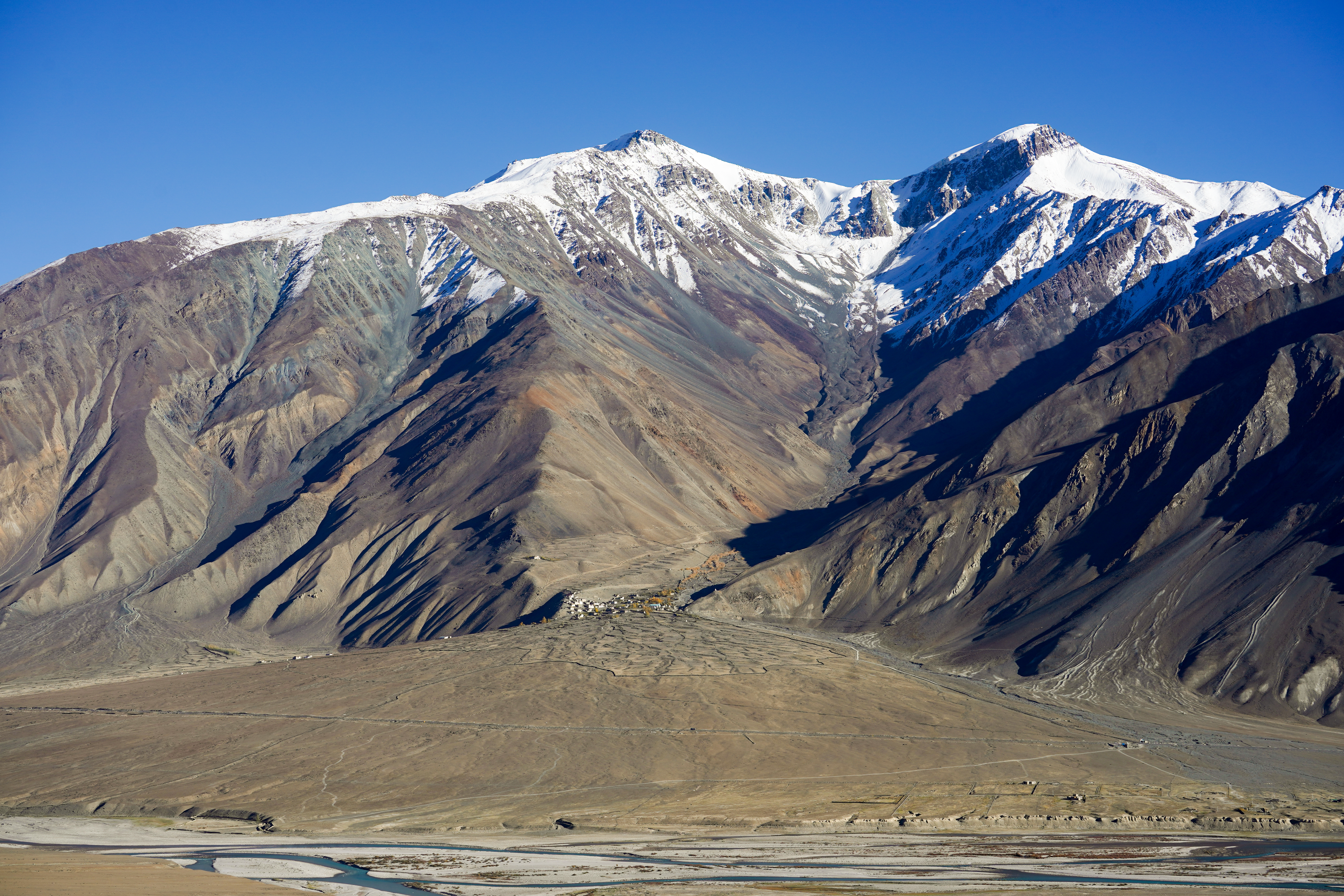
Kumik village at the base of Stongde Kangri peak

Stongdey (elevation 3,530 m (11,580 ft)) is a small village in the Zanskar valley on the right bank of the Zanskar River. It is located at a distance of 18 km (11 mi) from Padum on the Padum-Darcha road. Stongdey and the neighbouring Kumik village have a combined area of 256.60 hectares (634.1 acres). The two villages are located 3.3 km (2.1 mi) apart, on either side of the Nimmu-Padum highway. The elevation of Kumik is 3,750 m (12,300 ft).

== Demographics ==
The population of Stongdey and Kumik as of the 2011 Census was 914 with 138 households. Females comprised 47.8% of the population. The literacy rate was 47.4%. All but 3 of the inhabitants belonged to scheduled tribes. The pre-dominant religion is Buddhism.

== Governance ==
The Stongday Gram Panchayat is a government office and local self-government body that governs the villages of Stongdey and Kumik. The two villages together have a population of 914 as per the Census 2011.

== Amenities ==
Stongdey and Kumik have pre-primary, primary and middle schools. There is a Community Health Centre, mobile phone service and electricity supply are available.

== Economy ==
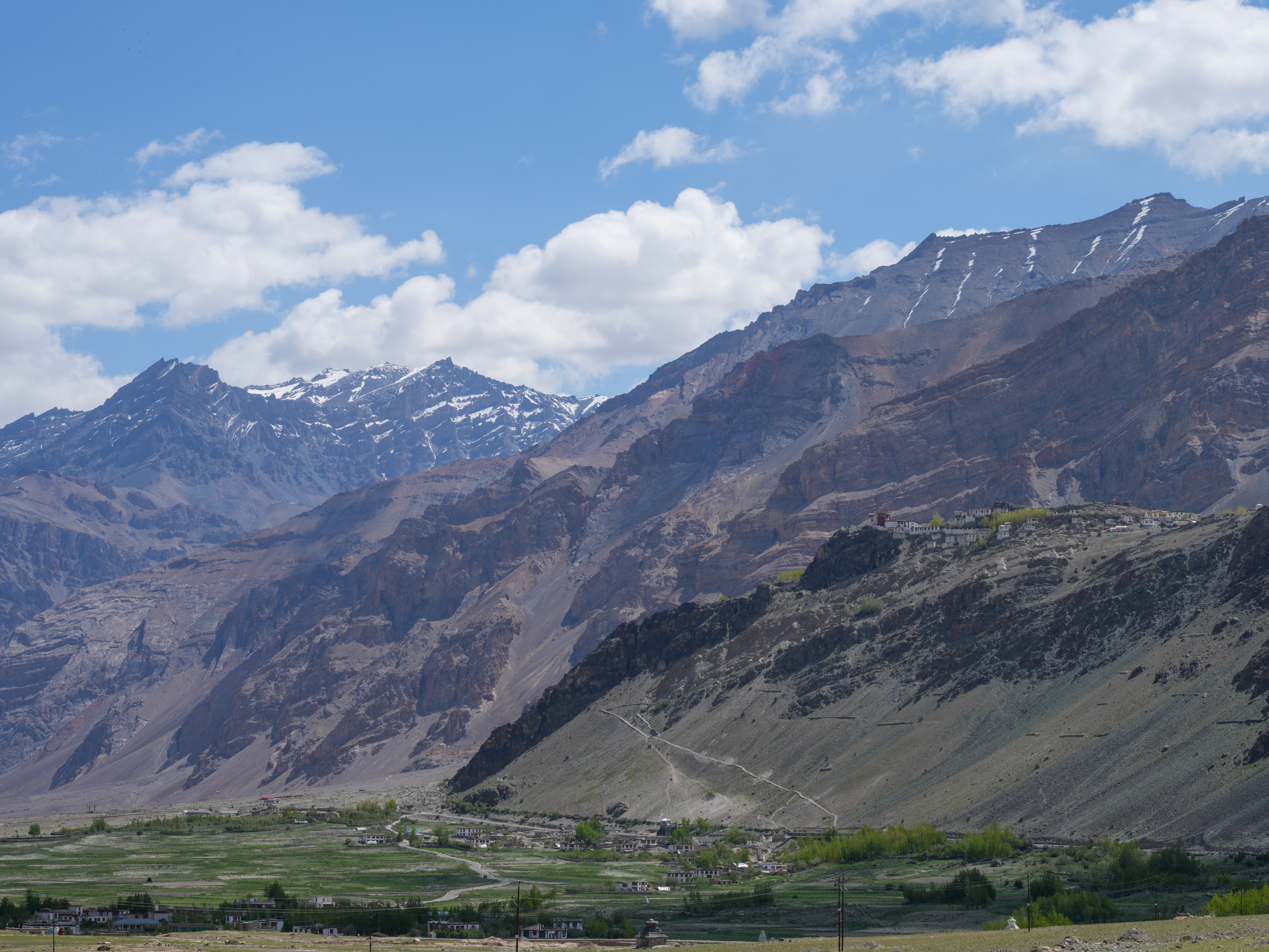
Newly-sown fields surrounding Stongdey. The monastery is on the hillock right of centre.

The economy is largely agrarian. With low annual precipitation, irrigation through channels from streams fed by snow-melt is used. In 2011, 59% of the cultivated land was irrigated.

== Transport ==
The villages are served by public/private buses and taxis.

== Tourism ==
The Stongdey Monastery is located on a hillock overlooking the village. Founded in 1052 CE, it is the second largest monastic institution in Zanskar.

== Notable people ==
- Tsultrim Chonjor

== See also ==
- Stongdey Monastery
