= Stongdey Monastery =

Buddhist monastery in northern India

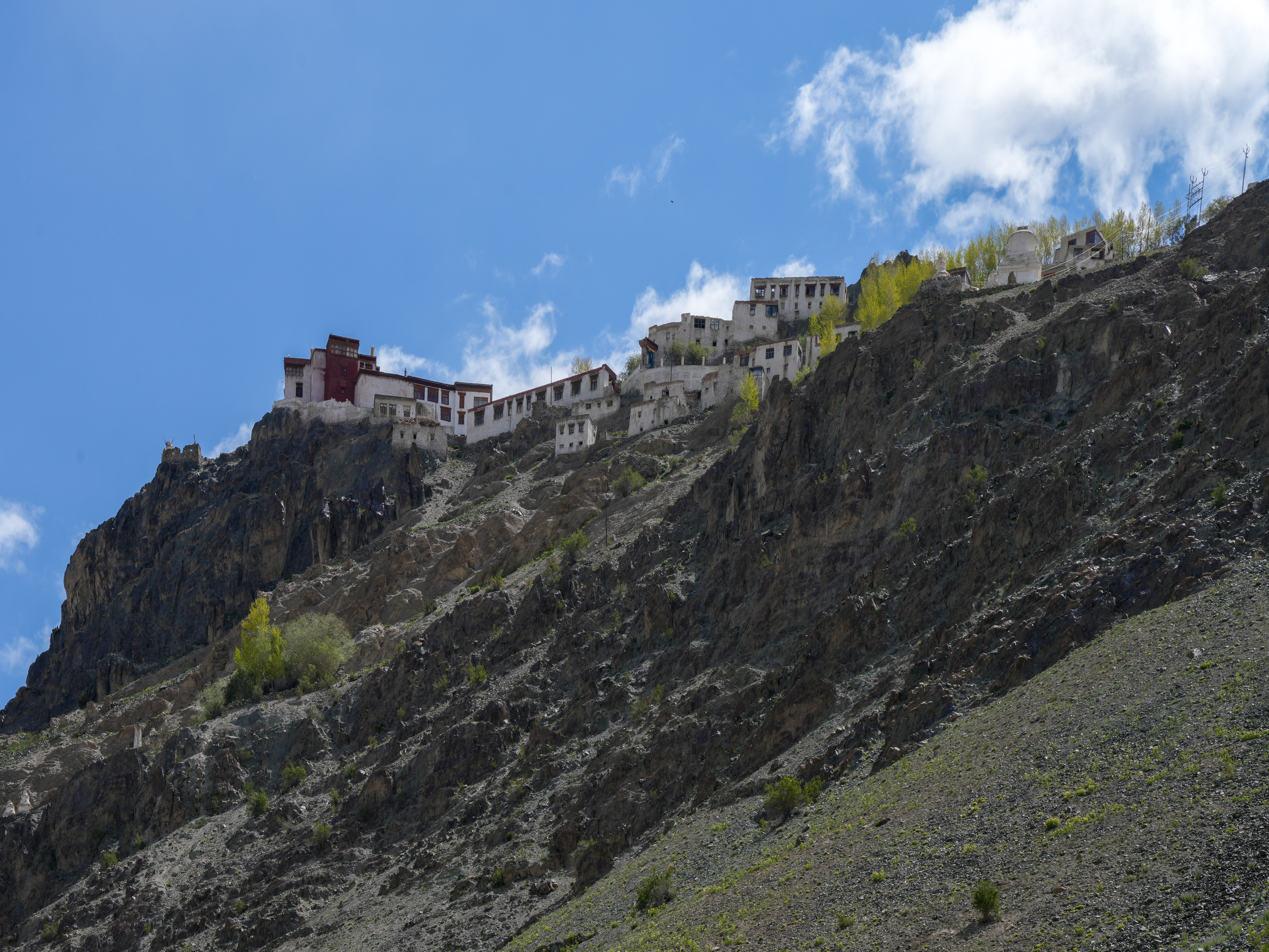
- Stongdey Gompa from the Nimmu-Padum road

- Location within India

Religion
- Affiliation: Tibetan Buddhism
- Sect: Gelug
- Deity: Je Tsongkhapa

Location
- Location: Zanskar River Valley, Ladakh, India
- Coordinates: 33°31′15″N 76°59′9″E

Architecture
- Founder: Lama Lhodak Marpa Choski Lodos
- Established: 1052; 974 years ago

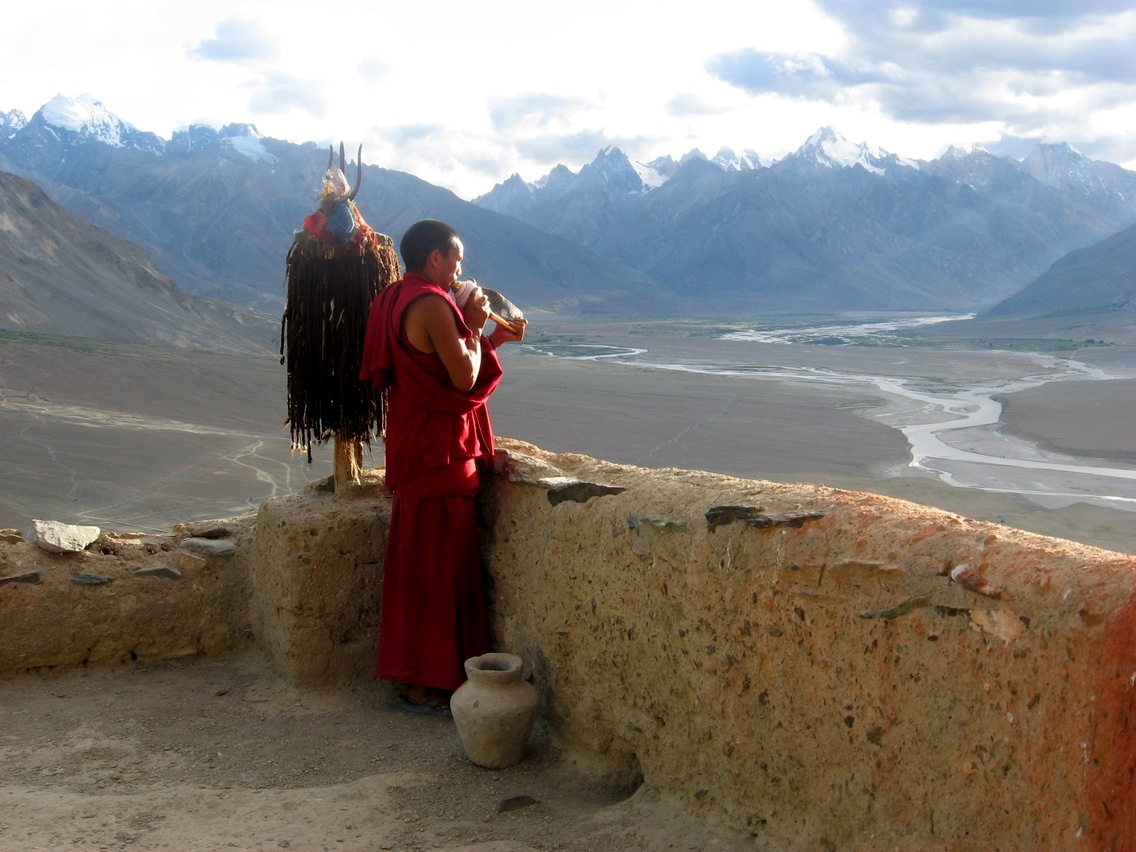
Sunset concert on the gompa roof

Stongdey Monastery, often written Stongde, Stongday, Tonday or Thonde, is a Buddhist monastery in Zanskar, Ladakh, northern India, approximately 18 km (11 mi) northeast of Padum, on the road to Nimmu. The monastery is located on a hillock overlooking the village of Stongdey.

The gompa was founded in 1052 by Naropa's disciple, the famous translator Lama Marpa Lotsawa (1012–1097). It was taken over by the Gelugpa about four centuries later and became dedicated to Je Tsongkhapa.

It is the second largest monastic institution in Zanskar, with a community of about 60 Gelukpa monks. Every year the Gustor Festival is held on the 28th and 29th day in the eleventh month of the Tibetan calendar.

There are seven temples in all. The Tshogs-khang is decorated with exquisite painting including some with deities on a black background outlined in gold.

== See also ==
- List of buddhist monasteries in Ladakh
- Geography of Ladakh
- Tourism in Ladakh
- World Monuments Fund
