= Darcha =

- Village
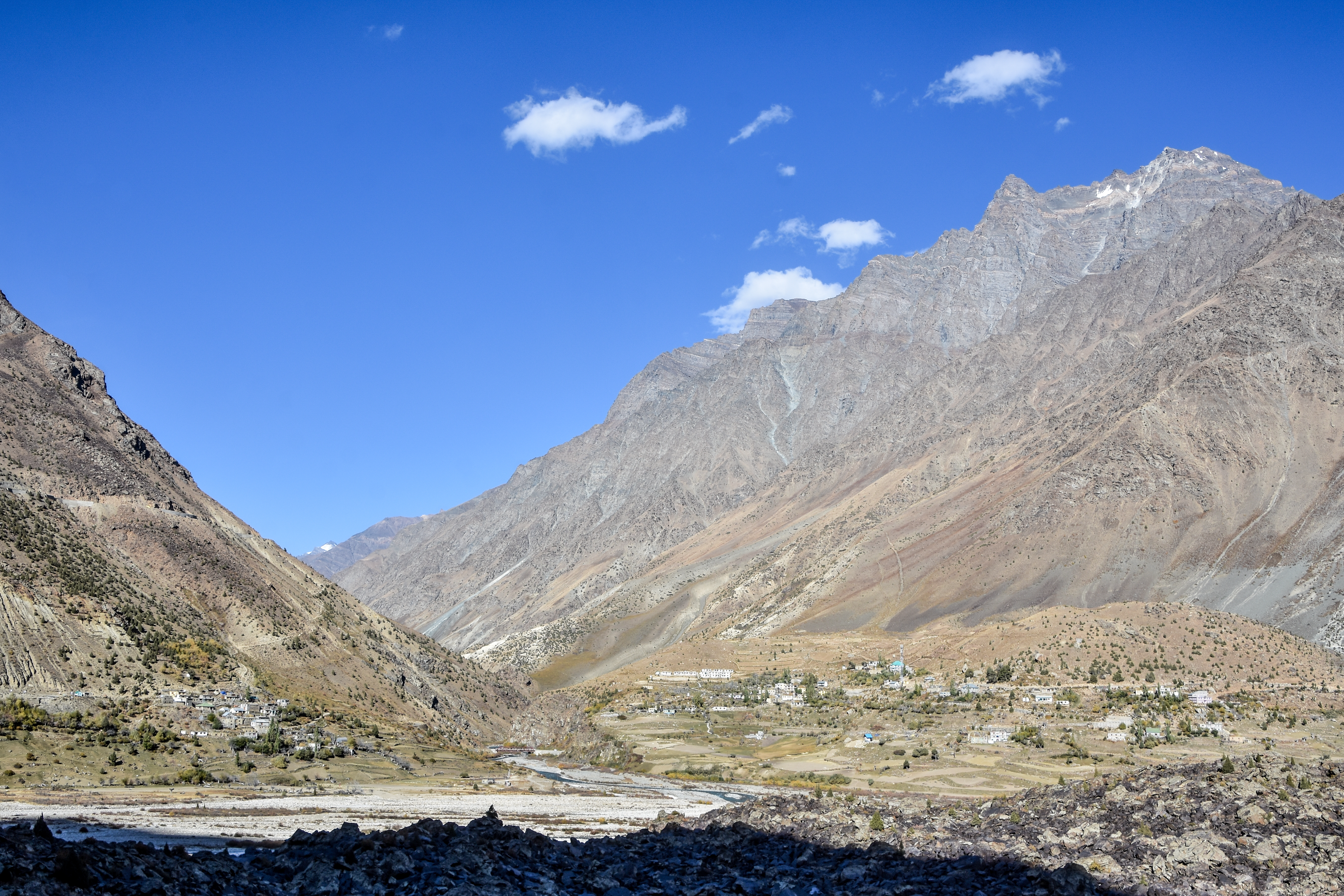
- Darcha Sumdo and Darach Dangma

- Location in Himachal Pradesh, India
- Coordinates: 32.674°N 77.216°E
- Country: India
- State: Himachal Pradesh
- District: Lahaul and Spiti

Area
  - Total: 0.51 km^{2} (0.20 sq mi)
- Elevation: 3,360 m (11,020 ft)

Population (2011)
  - Total: 358
  - Density: 700/km^{2} (1,800/sq mi)

Languages
  - Official: Hindi
- Time zone: UTC+5:30 (IST)
- PIN: 175132
- Vehicle registration: HP-42

Darcha (elevation 3,360 m or 11,020 ft) is a pair of villages (Darcha Sumdo and Darach Dangma) on the Bhaga River in the Lahaul sub-division in the Lahaul and Spiti district in the Indian state of Himachal Pradesh. It is the northernmost permanent settlement in Himachal Pradesh along the Manali-Leh Highway. With the opening of the Atal Tunnel, Darcha is likely to see a large influx of tourists as it is now connected to Manali throughout the year. The Nimmu–Padam–Darcha road which is being constructed, will improve connectivity of Kargil, Zanskar and Leh District of Ladakh to Darcha.

== Demographics and amenities ==
Darcha consists of two adjacent villages, Darcha Sumdo and Darcha Dangma with a total area of 51.3 ha (127 acres). Information on Darcha from the Census of India 2011 is given in the table below.

Census 2011 data on Darcha Sumdo and Darcha Dangma
Measure	Darcha Sumdo	Darcha Dangma	Darcha (total)
Area (ha)	10.6	40.7	51.3
Population	172	166	338
Households	38	34	72
Scheduled Caste	<5%	Nil	
Scheduled Tribes	41-50%	>75%	

Schooling from primary up to senior secondary (Class 1 to 12) is available in the village. There is a Primary Health Centre at Darcha. Drinking water is available, and the village has power and telephone connections.

== Transport ==
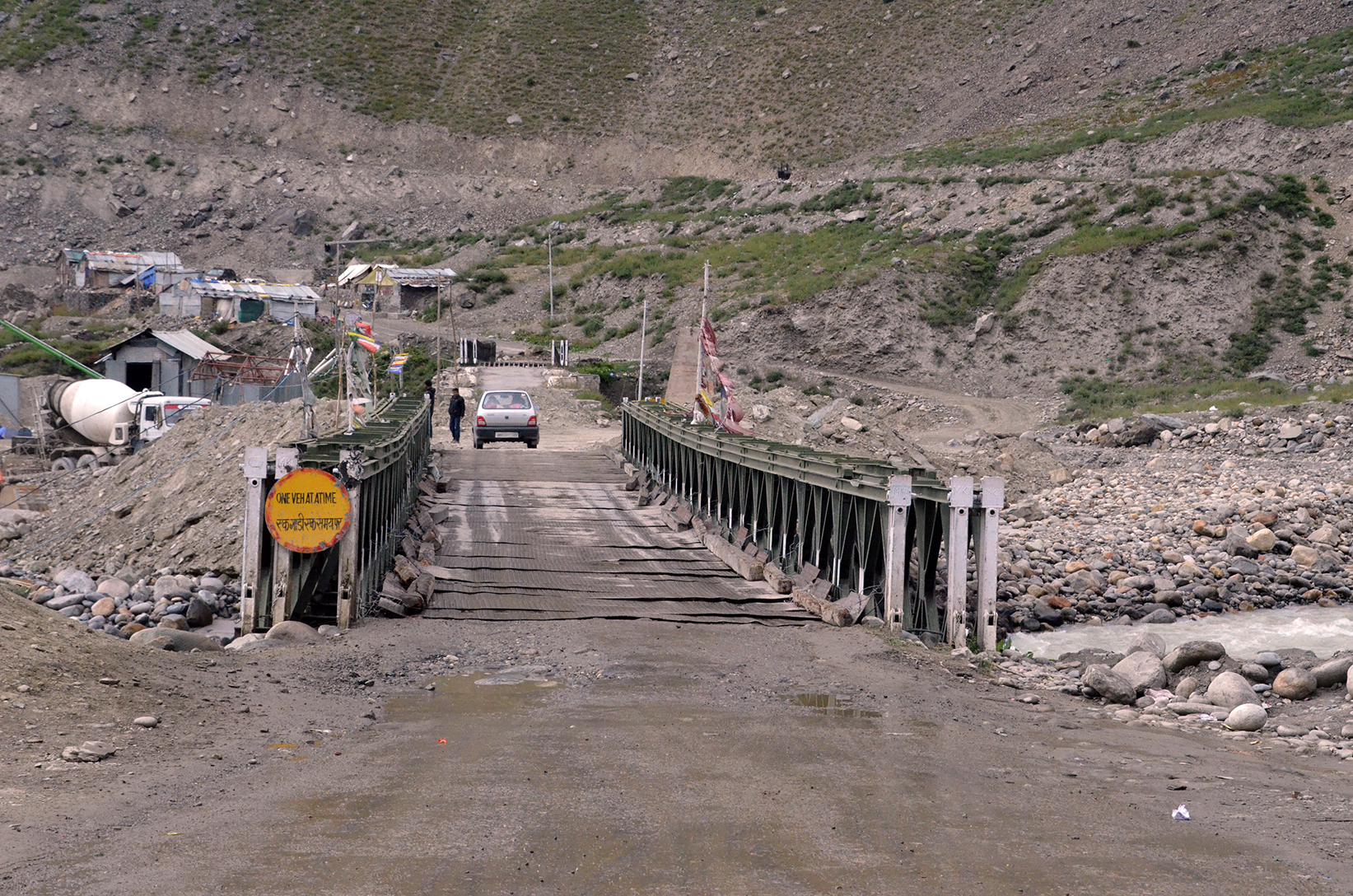
Old bridge at Darcha

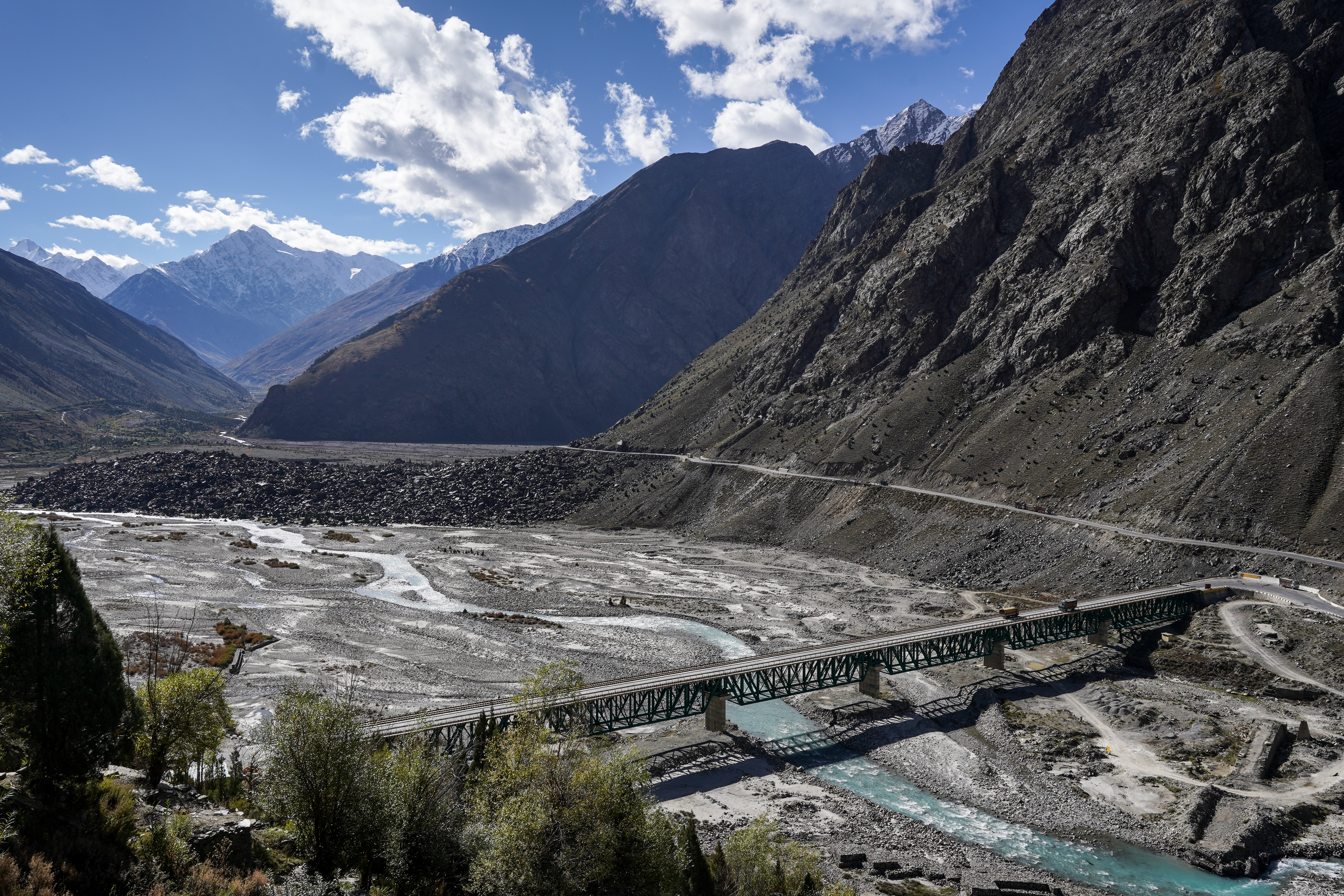
New bridge at Darcha.

Darcha will be a station on the under-construction Bhanupli–Leh line. Darcha lies on NH-3.

Some buses between Manali and Leh stop for the night at Darcha where travelers sleep in tents. A new all weather steel bridge of 360 meters length has been built over the confluence of the Bhaga river and Jankar Nala on the Leh-Manali Highway. The village is the end-point of a popular trek beginning in Padum, Zanskar. Roadside stalls offer basic food.

All passing vehicles must stop at Darcha's police checkpoint for identification and passport checks.

== Gallery ==
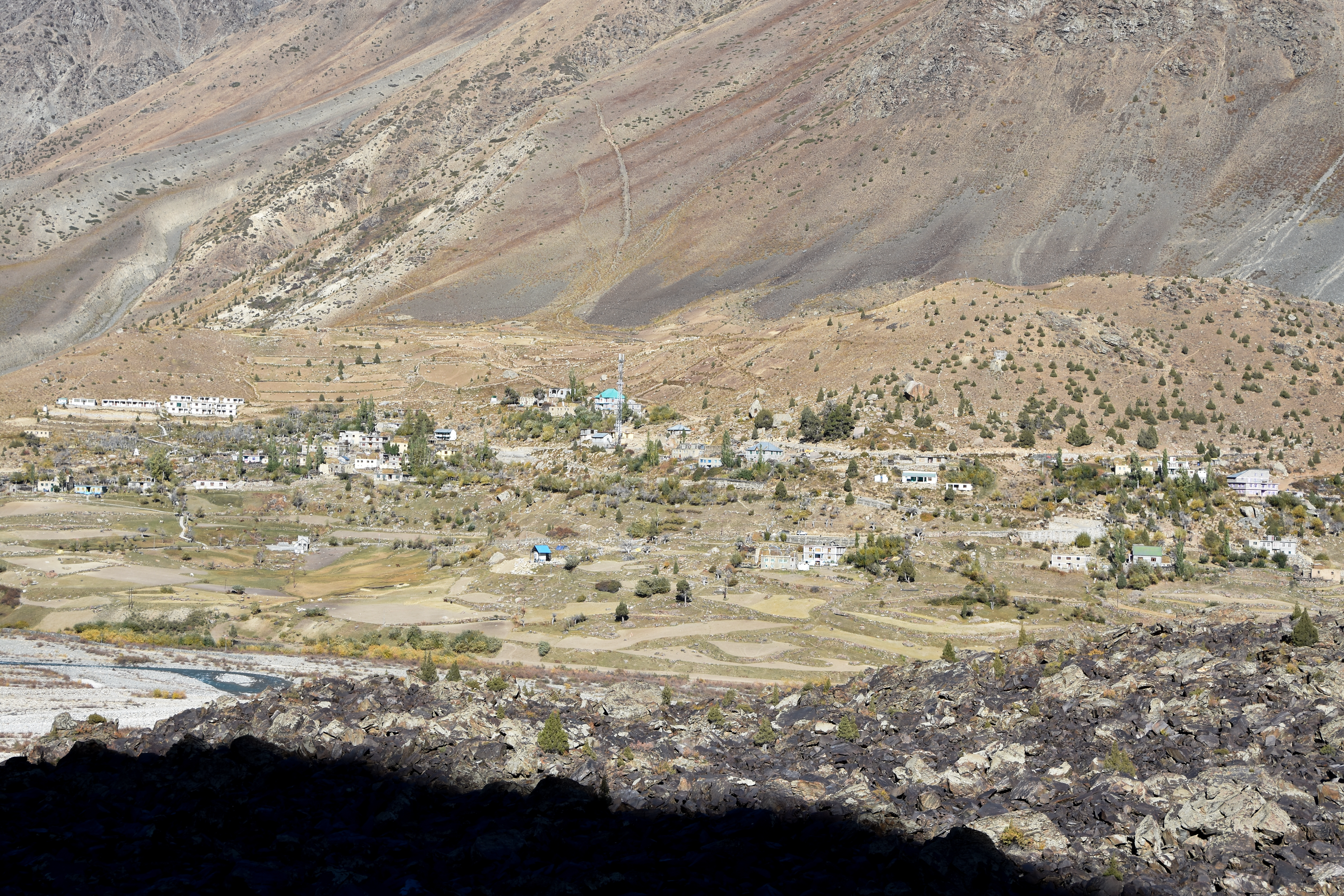
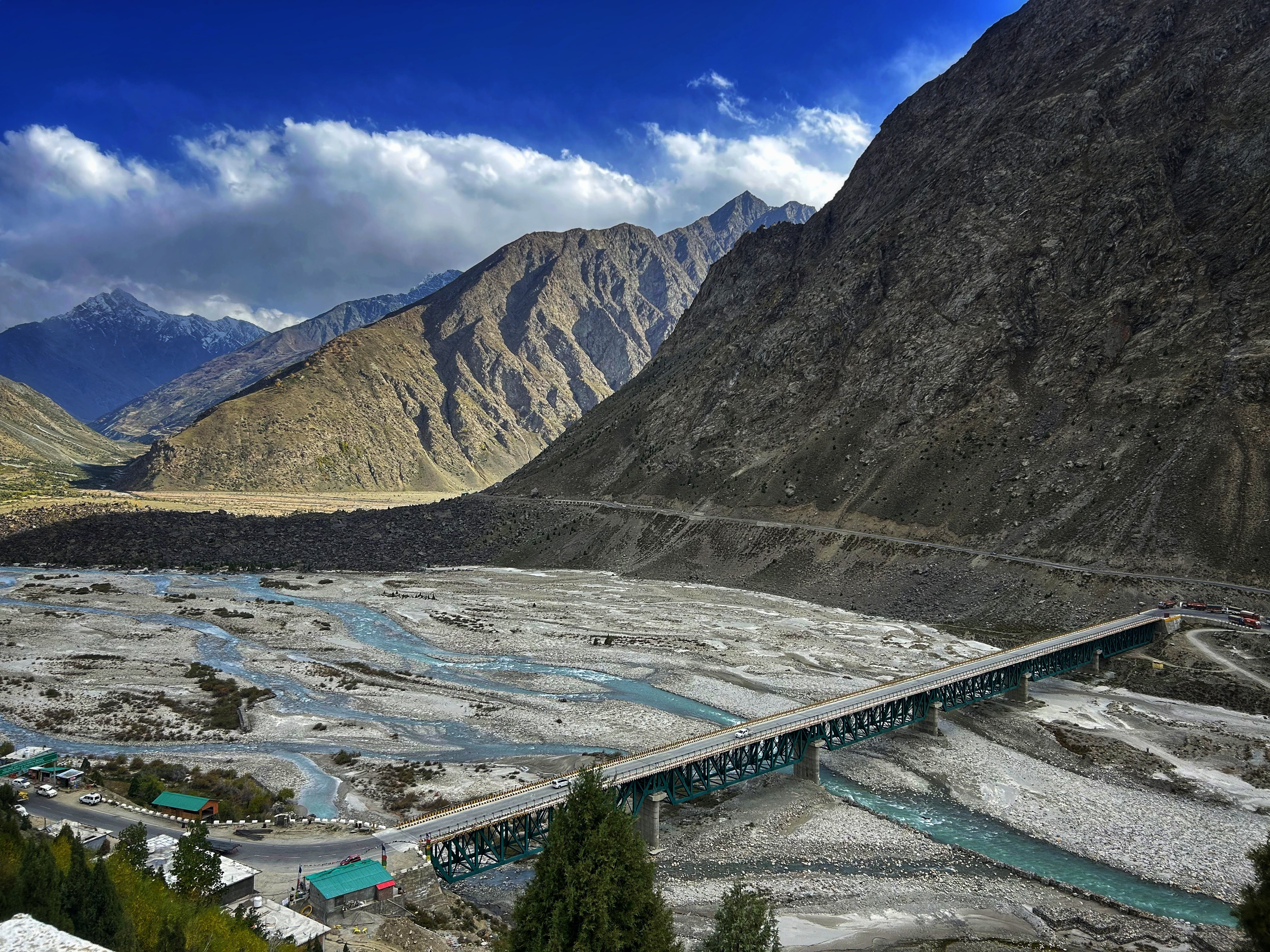
Darcha Bridge on Jankar Nala
Darcha Dangma village, Oct 2020

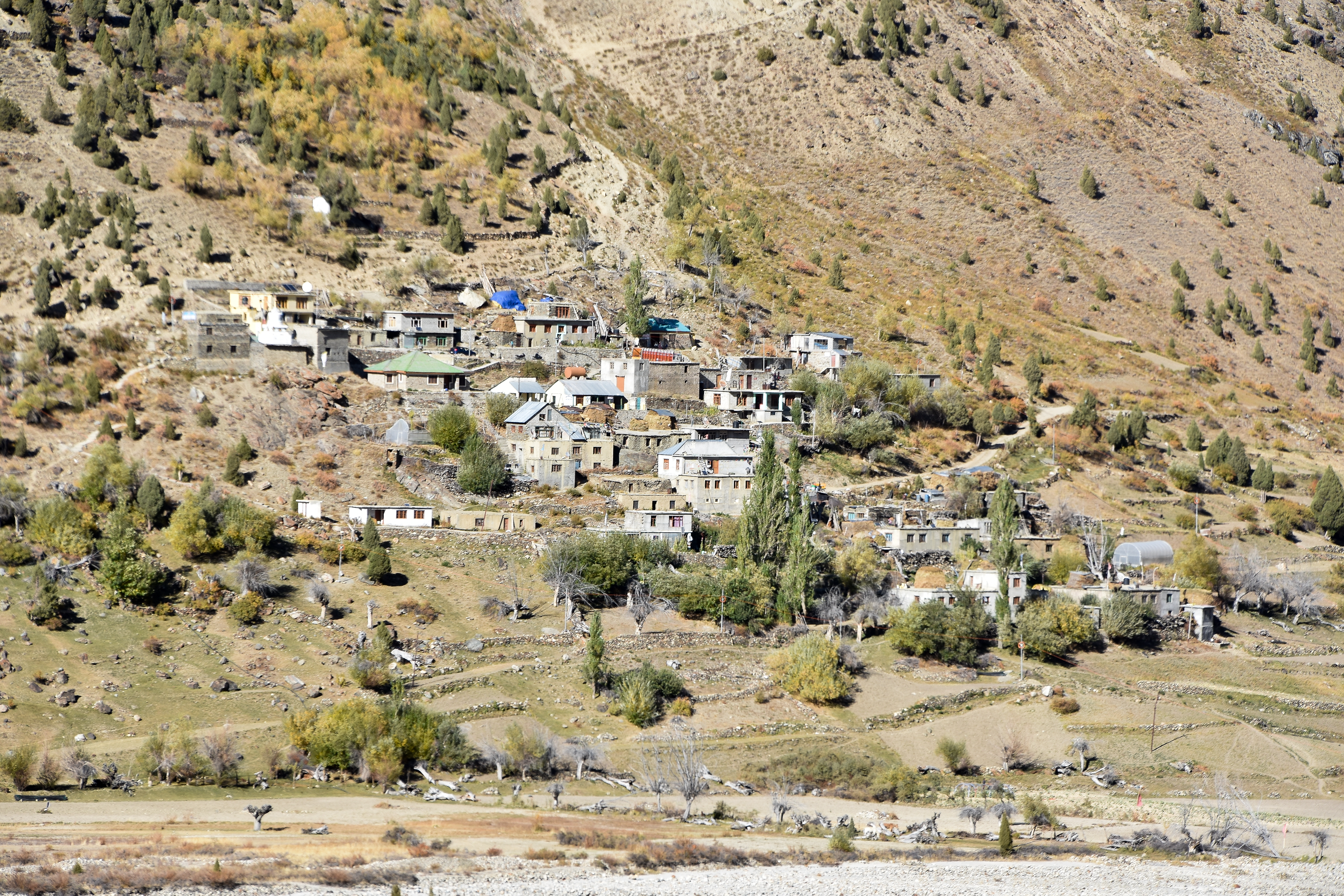
Darcha village, Oct 2020

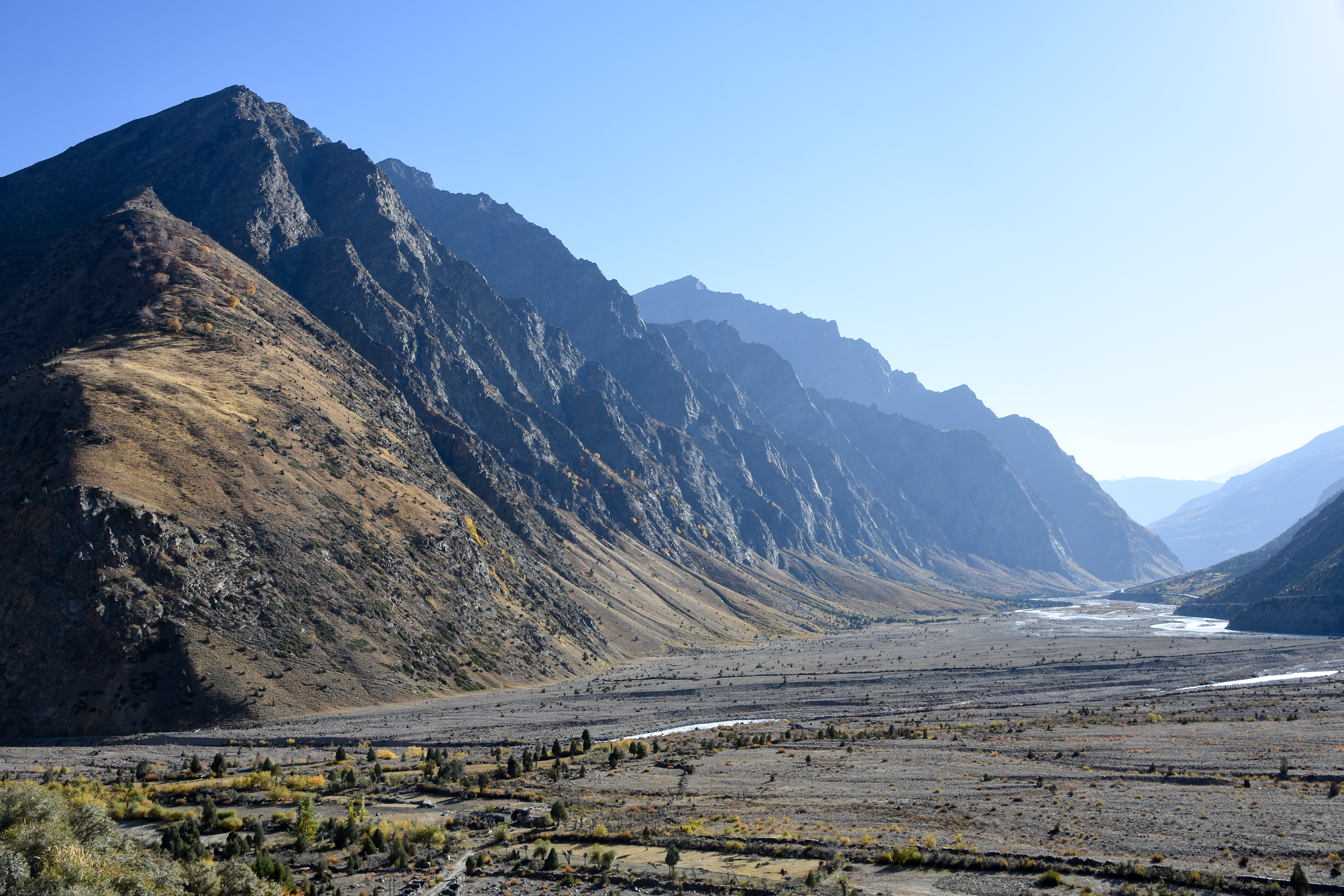
R. Bhaga, Darcha to Gemur, Oct '20

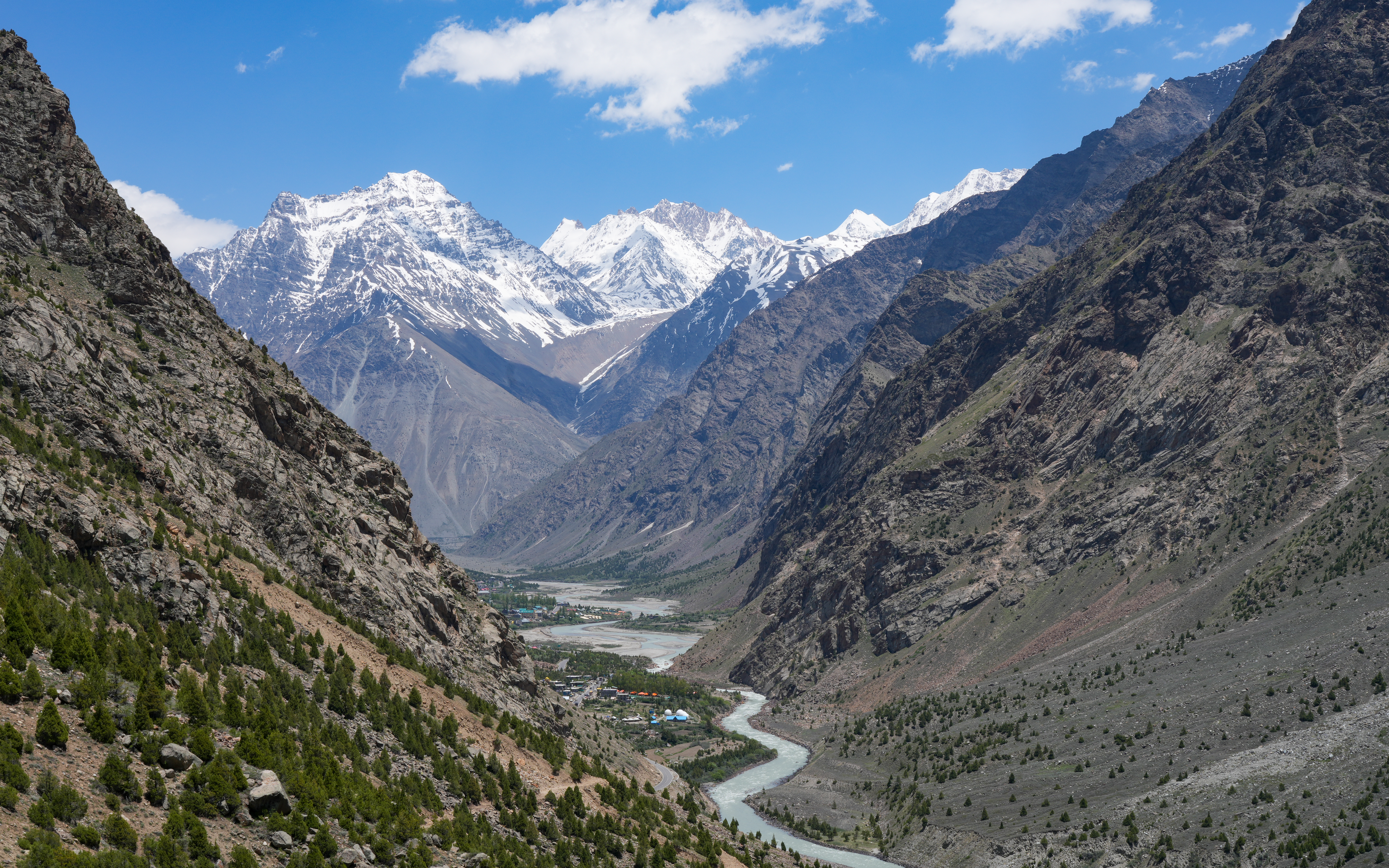
R. Bhaga from Darcha past Jispa to Gemur, Jun '24

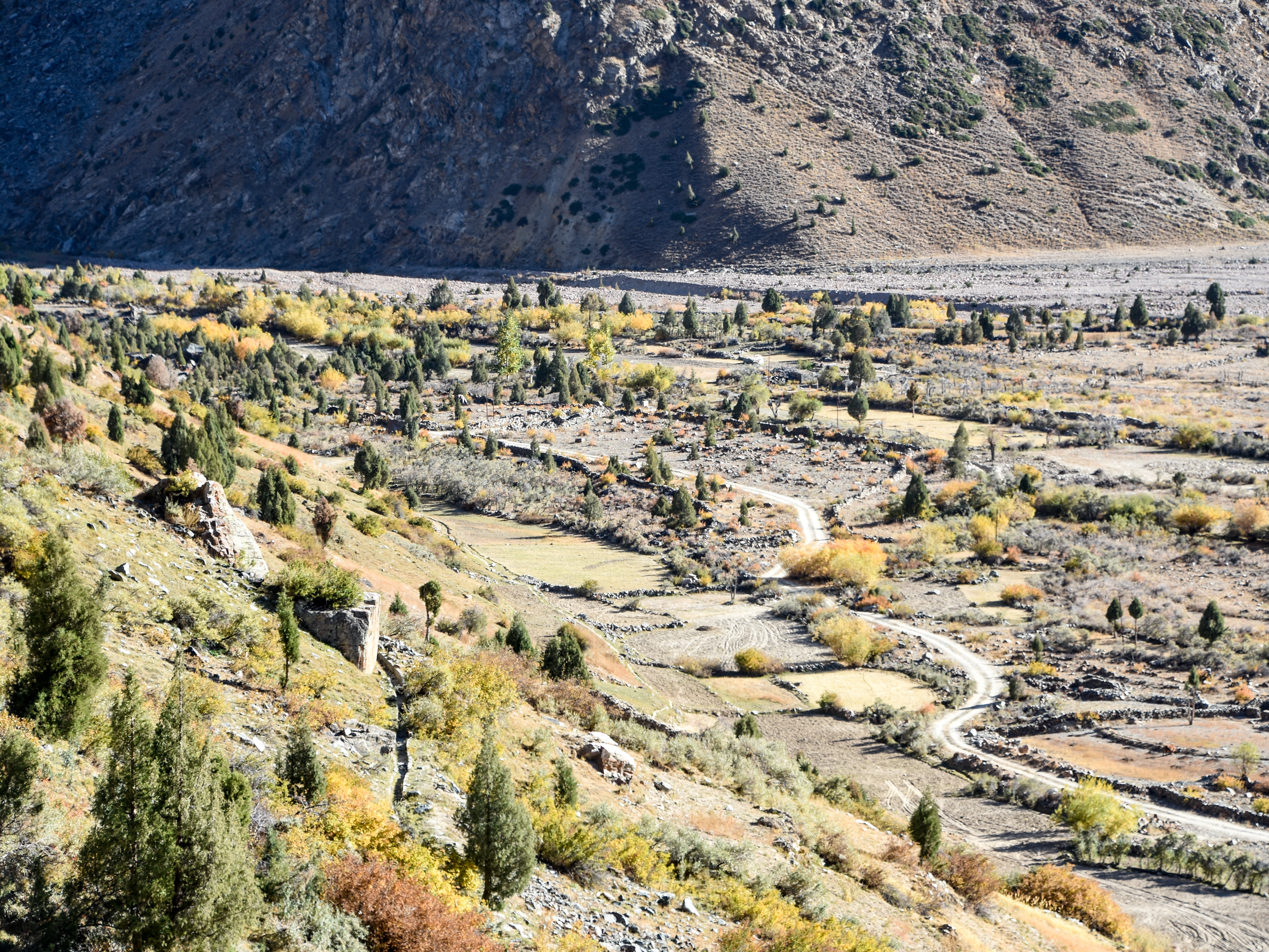
Fields on the Bhaga river bed, Oct '20
