= Phugtal Monastery =

Buddhist Monastery in Ladakh, India

Phuktal Monastery
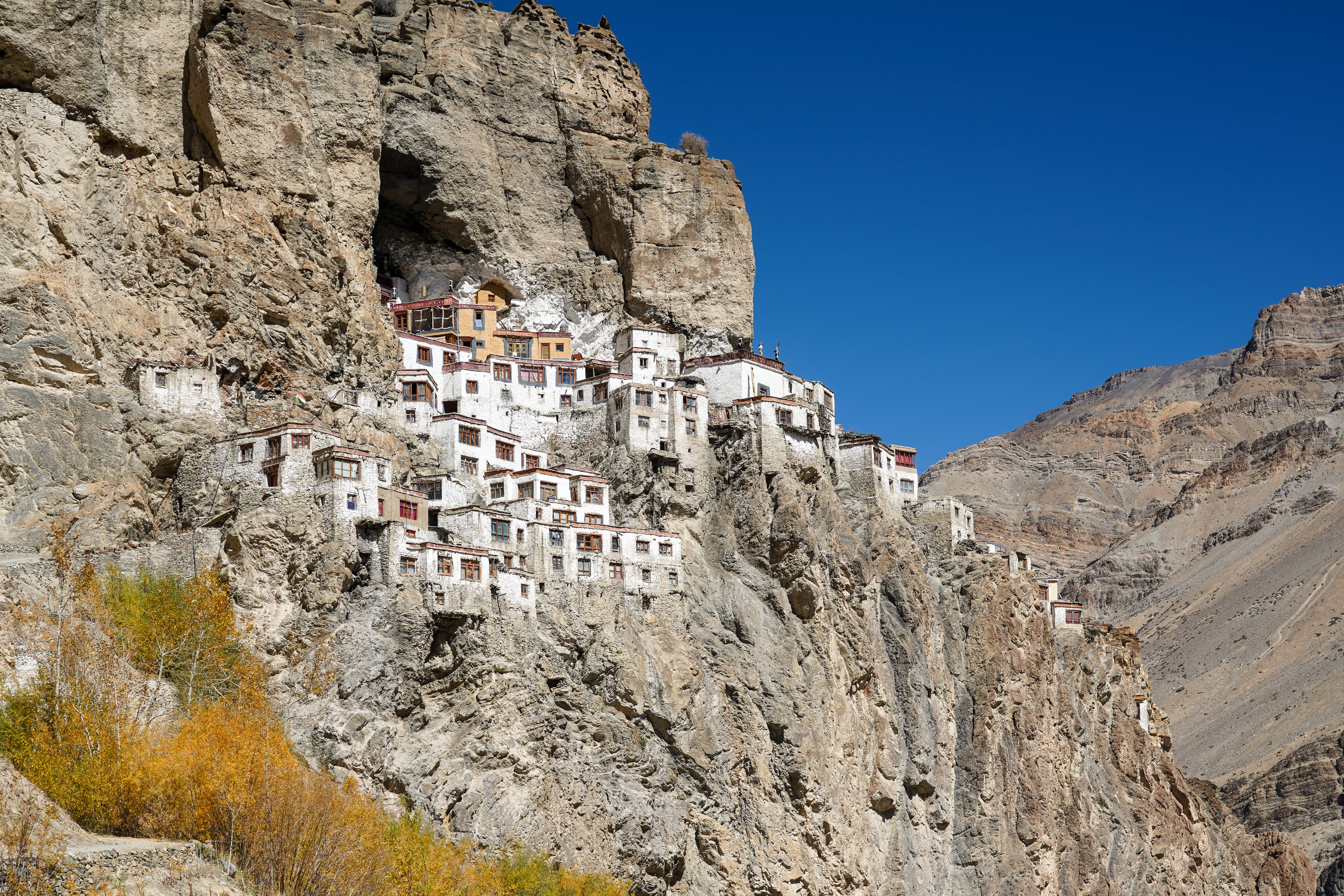

- Location within the UT of Ladakh, India

Religion
- Affiliation: Tibetan Buddhism
- Sect: Gelugpa

Location
- Location: Zanskar district, Ladakh, India
- Coordinates: 33°16′6.1097″N 77°10′46.3508″E

Architecture
- Founder: Jangsem Sherap Zangpo

Phuktal Monastery or Phuktal Gompa (often transliterated as Phugtal) is a Buddhist monastery located in the remote Lungnak Valley in south-eastern Zanskar, in the Himalayan region of Ladakh, in Northern India. It is 52 km southeast of Padum on Nimmu–Padum–Darcha road (NPD). Solar power was installed at the Phugtal monastery in 2016.

Until 2023 before Nimmu–Padum–Darcha road was built, it was one of the few Buddhist monasteries in Ladakh that could still be reached only by foot. Supplies to the monastery were brought on horses, donkeys, and mules in the warmer months, and in the frozen winters, they were transported through the frozen Zanskar River. Before the road was built, it was a day's walk from Village Chah or Village Khangsaar, the end of the road leading from Padum.

== Background ==
=== Etymology ===
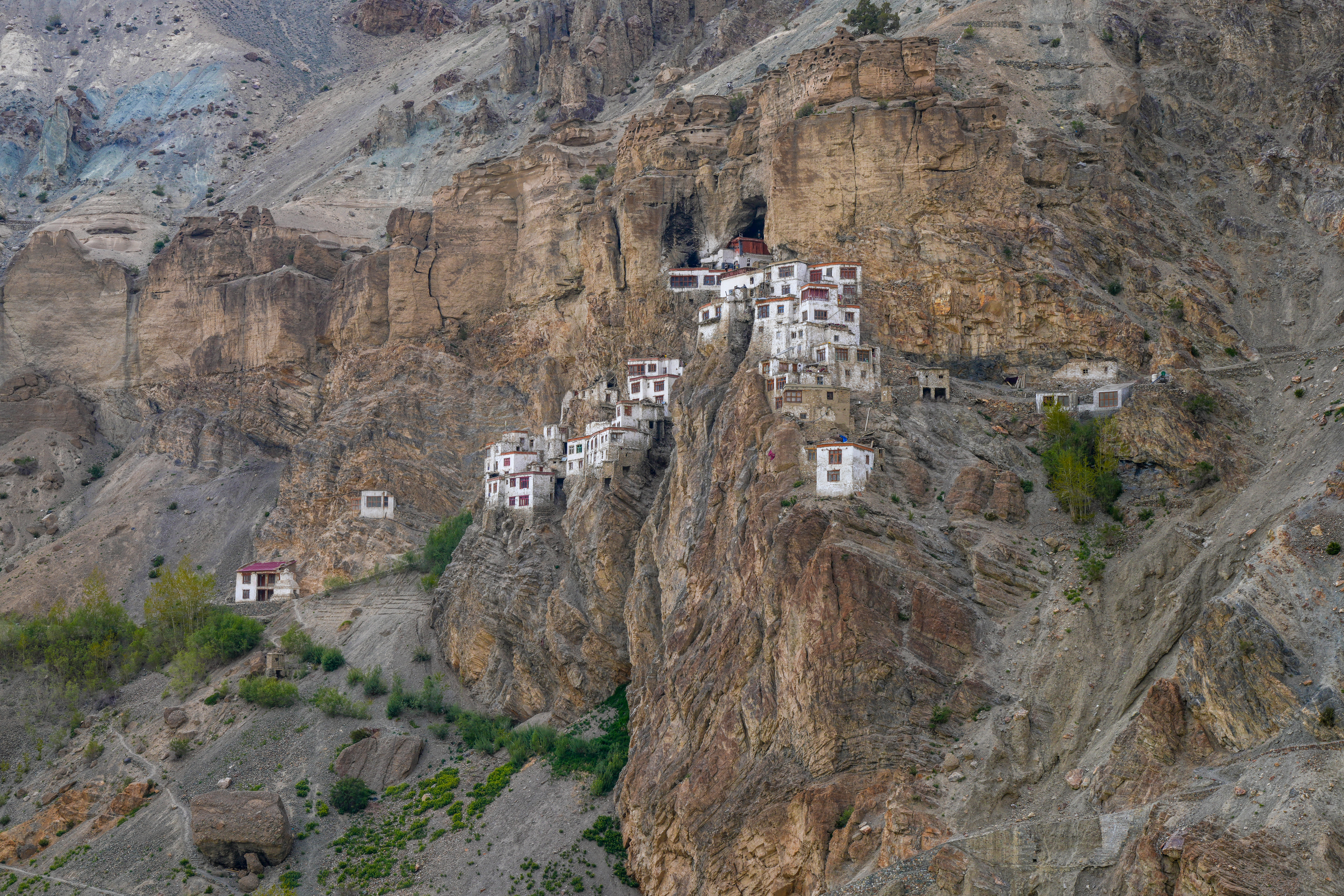
The monastery consists of several buildings built in and around a cave on a cliff rising above the Tsarap river.

The Phuktal Gompa owes its legacy to powerful and renowned scholars and teachers who resided in the cave, around which the monastery has been built, and has for long been a place for retreat, meditation, learning, and teaching. This is reflected in its name Phuktal, which is derived from Phukthal, made up of Phuk ཕུག meaning 'cave', and Tal དལ་ or Thal meaning 'at leisure' in the endangered Zangskari dialect of the Tibetic languages. An alternate spelling of Phuktal is Phukthar, where Thar ཐར means 'liberation'. Hence, the name Phuktal means 'the cave of leisure' or 'the cave of liberation'.

=== History ===
There is a stone tablet which serves as a reminder of the stay of Alexander Csoma de Kőrös at Phuktal, while he worked on the first English-Tibetan dictionary between 1826 and 1827, when he explored Ladakh.

== 12th century Phuktal Monastery ==
=== Cave monastery ===
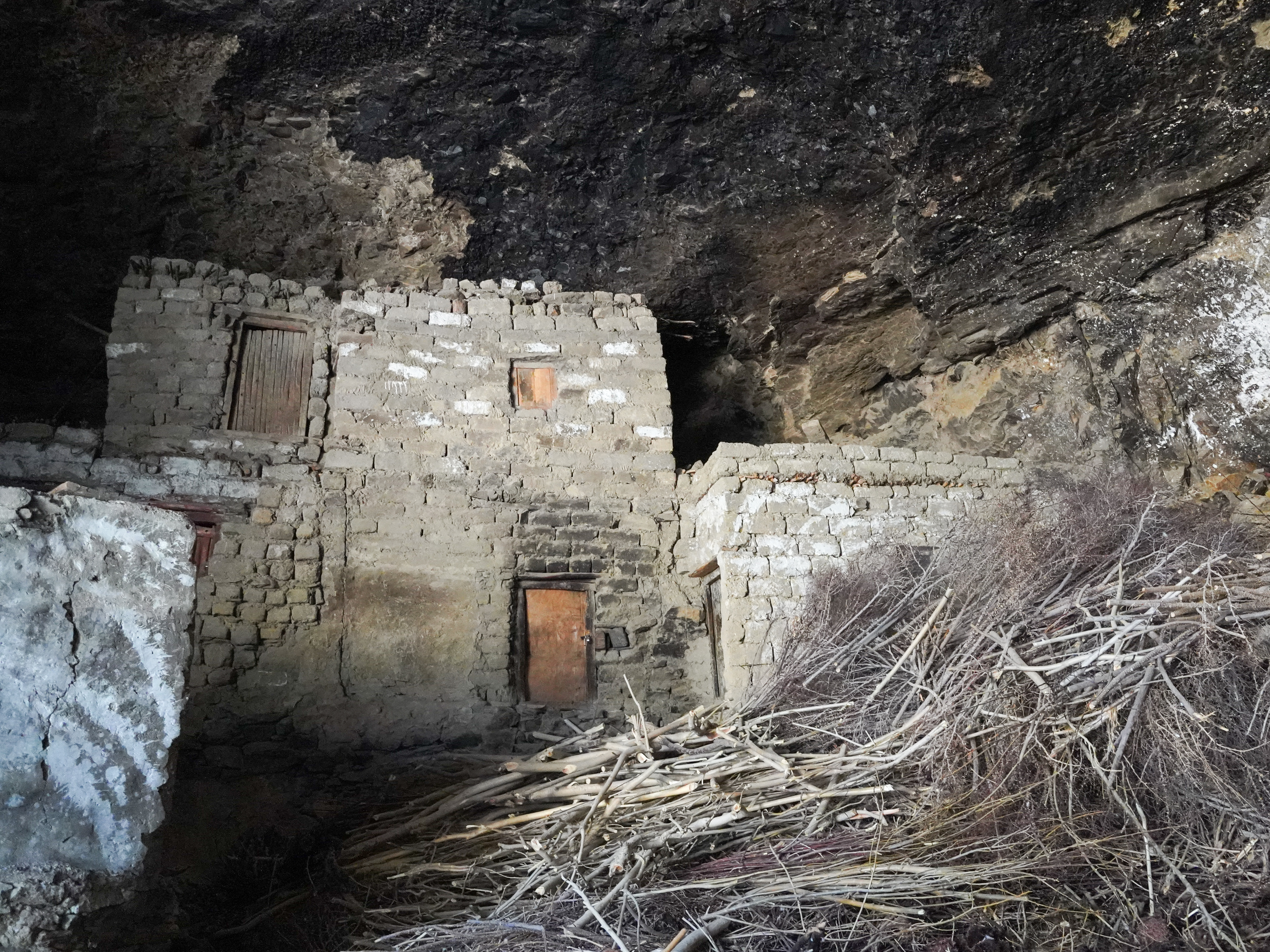
Old rooms inside the cave.

The Phuktal Monastery is built around a natural cave, which is believed to have been visited by numerous sages, scholars, translators, and monks around 2,550 years ago. The remote location of the monastery was ideal for monks looking for peace and solitude to meditate. The present Phuktal Gompa, of the Gelug school of Tibetan Buddhism, was established in the early 15th century by Jangsem Sherap Zangpo, a disciple of Je Tsongkhapa. Tsongkhapa was the founder of Gelug, which is one of the newest schools of Tibetan Buddhism.

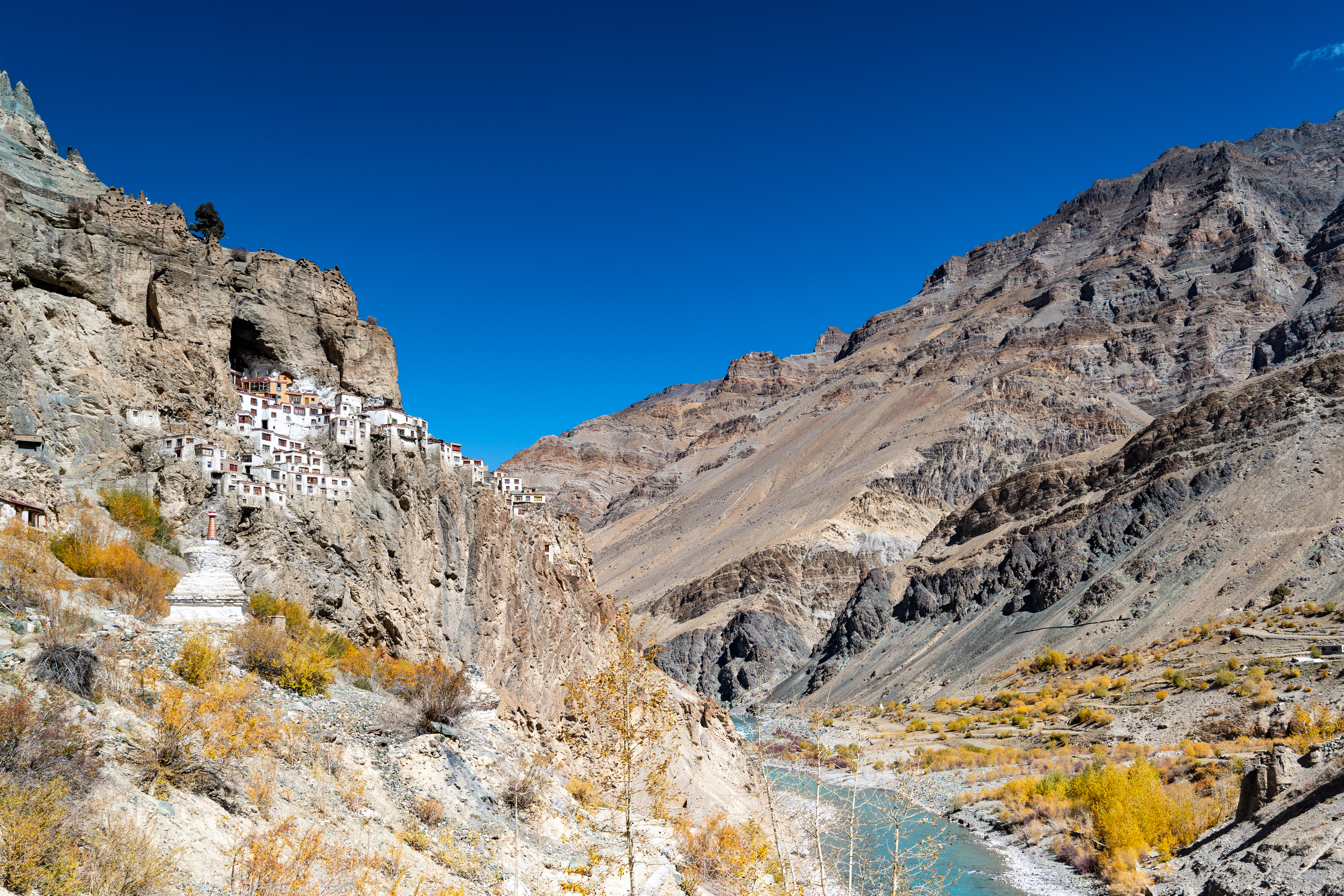
Phugtal Monastery perched on the hills looking up from the valley.

Believed to be one of the earliest residents of the cave are the 16 Arhats, or the legendary followers of Buddha. The images of these 16 Arhats appear on the cave walls. The great scholars and translators Padmasambhava and Phakspa Nestan Dusdan are believed to have lived in the cave, and so is the great leader and translator Lama Marpa Lotsawa. In the 12th century, the Tibetan translator Zanskar Lotsawa Phagpa Sherab also lived and worked from Phuktal. The eminent scholars and brothers Dangsong, Pun, and Sum, who were believed to have the supernatural power of flight gave teachings on Dharma at Phuktal. When Jangsem Sherap Zangpo arrived at Phuktal, the three brothers bequeathed the holy site to him and departed. According to legend, the spiritually gifted Zangpo caused a spring to appear and run from the cave, a tree to grow on top of the cave and for the cave itself to grow larger in size. Then, under his guidance, the present structure of the monastery was built around the cave. It is built in the cliffside, like a honeycomb. The cliff is part of a lateral gorge of a major tributary of the Lungnak River (Lingti-Tsarap River). The monastery today houses a main temple, prayer rooms, a library with rare sacred texts, apartments and living quarters, teaching facilities, a kitchen, and of course, the original cave and the sacred spring, which is protected. It is home to about 70 monks.

=== Phuktal Monastic School ===
Phuktal Gompa has set up the Phuktal Monastic School that caters to the students of the local Lungnak Valley (also called Tsarap River Valley) of Zanskar. The school was set up in 1993, at the behest of Geshe Lharampa Nagri Choszed. Wholistic education is provided, which involves a mix of traditional Tibetan Buddhist learning and modern curriculum. No fees are charged from the students, and the monastery bears the cost for the room, board and study materials of the students, with help from sponsors. Many students are children from the local farming families in the Lungnak Valley, which are extremely poor and uneducated.

On 31 December 2014, a landslide near Phuktal caused the formation of a landslide dam on the Tsarap River which broke in May 2015 and washed away the school campus which was later restored with the financial aid from Jammu and Kashmir State Government and the Central Government.

=== Traditional Tibetan medical clinic ===
The Phuktal Gompa maintains a Traditional Tibetan medical clinic, catering to the local community. There is an on-site Amchi, a traditional Tibetan physician who provides natural Sowa-Rigpa medicine, many of which have been prepared at the monastery itself.

=== Festivals ===
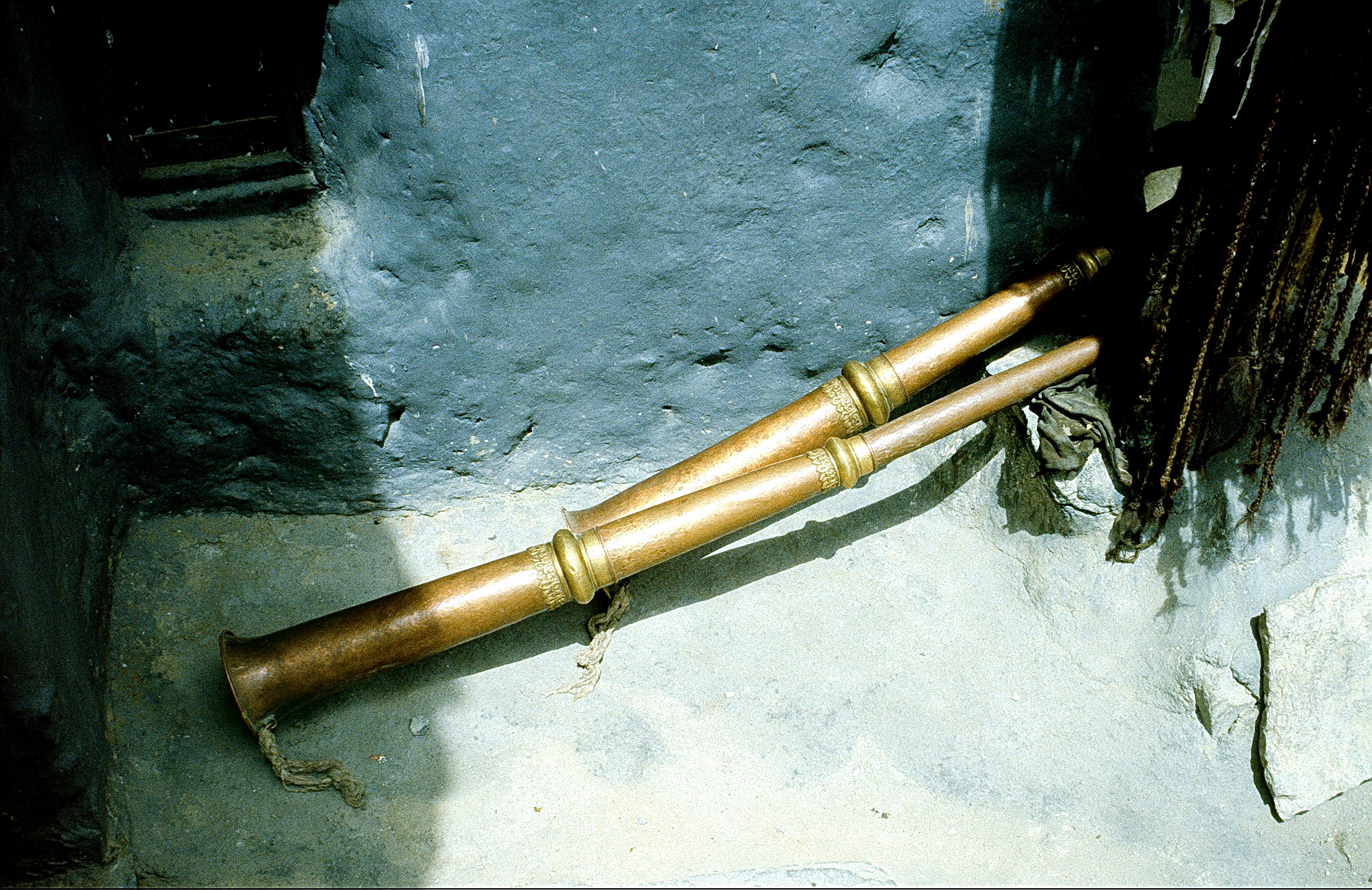
Trumpets used to announce the prayer services.

Festivals are an important feature of the Phuktal Gompa. These are occasions for the monks to interact with the villagers and for the villagers to visit the monastery. Festivals help to preserve the centuries-old traditions and to spread dharma. They also enable the monks to accumulate good karma for the next life through offerings, worship, prayers and service. The festivals celebrated at Phuktal Monastery, starting around the end of February, are mentioned below. The Tibetan calendar is a lunisolar calendar, hence the dates for these festivals differ each year as compared to the Gregorian calendar.

1. Smonlam Chenmo: The Smonlam Chenmo, also known as Monlam Chenmo (Tibetan for 'great prayer') is the most important Tibetan Buddhist celebration of the year, and signifies the start of the New Year. Special ceremonies are held for world peace and the wellbeing of all people. It falls towards the end of February or the beginning of March.
2. Chudsum Chodpa: This festival is held right after the Smonlam Chenmo. It is held to worship thirteen special deities.
3. Chonga Chodpa: This is celebrated immediately after the Chudsum Chodpa and is a harvest ceremony. For this festival, monks create a special torma, which is a statue made of barley flour and butter, and is worshipped by villagers.
4. Gyalwe Jabstan: Held after the Chonga Chodpa, this festival involves a puja for the long life of the 14th Dalai Lama.
5. Jigched Lhachusum Ceremony: This ceremony is held between the end of March and the end of May or the beginning of June.
6. Initiation of Vajrabhairava: This festival is for the worship of Vajrabhairava, the most wrathful form of Manjushri. It is celebrated towards the end of May or the beginning of June.
7. Syungnas: The festival of Syungnas is a fasting ceremony to purge oneself of all sin and to accumulate good karma. It is celebrated after mid-June.
8. Yarnas: This is also known as the Varshavas Ceremony. For this ceremony, monks remain confined within the monastery and some limited outlying areas and perform special daily pujas to avoid and make good the negative karma accumulated from treading upon plants, insects and microorganisms. It is held between the end of July to mid September, and visitors need to obtain special permission from the head Lama of the monastery to attend a short portion of the Yarnas.
9. Gadam Nagchod: The Gadam Nagchod or the Lightning Ceremony is held sometime during the beginning of December to mark the death anniversary of Je Tsongkhapa, the founder of the Gelug branch of Tibetan Buddhism.
10. Phukta Gutor: Held towards the end of February, and before the Smonlam Chenmo, this festival is one of the most important festivals at Phuktal Gompa. It signals the end of the Tibetan year, and is held for world peace and harmony. It is attended by many Zanskaris and Ladakhis.

=== Culture ===
The village and the monastery has remained largely untouched by modern development. The village life in the Lungnak Valley revolves around the monastery. Monks from the monastery attend local village events of significance, such as birth, deaths and weddings, performing traditional prayer ceremonies. The villagers visit the monastery to offer prayers, consult the Amchi and to attend festivals and special events at the monastery.

== Connectivity ==
=== Electricity and internet ===
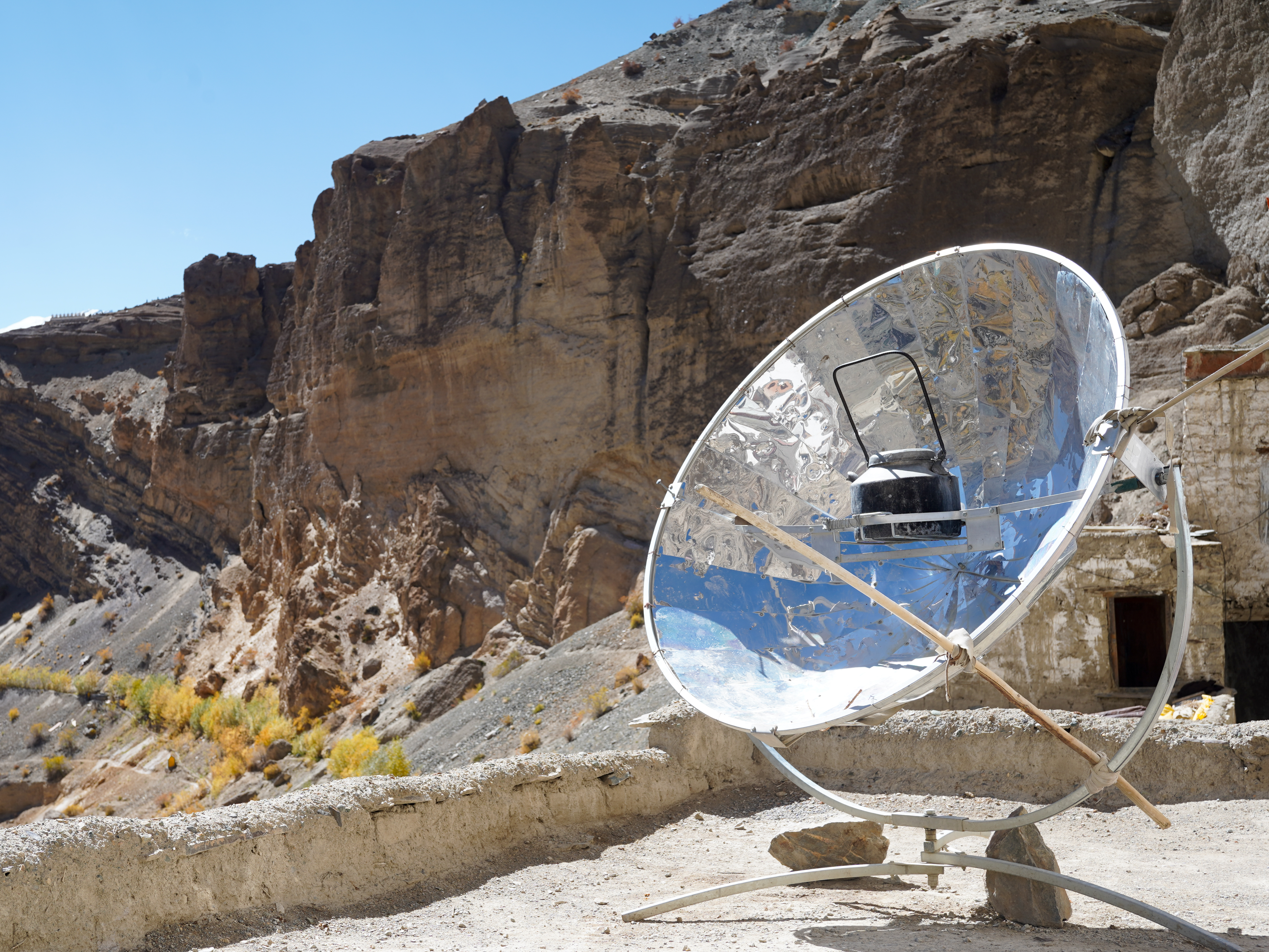
Solar cooker at Phuktar Monastery in October 2022.

The Phugtal Monastery was electrified by Global Himalayan Expedition in July 2016 through setting up of 7 solar micro-grids with over 270 LED bulbs and 4 streetlights, providing electricity to approximately 80 rooms.

In 2026, the phone and internet coverage from BSNL 2G/3G, Jio 4G, and Airtel 5G is available only along the patches of NPD Road.

=== Transport ===
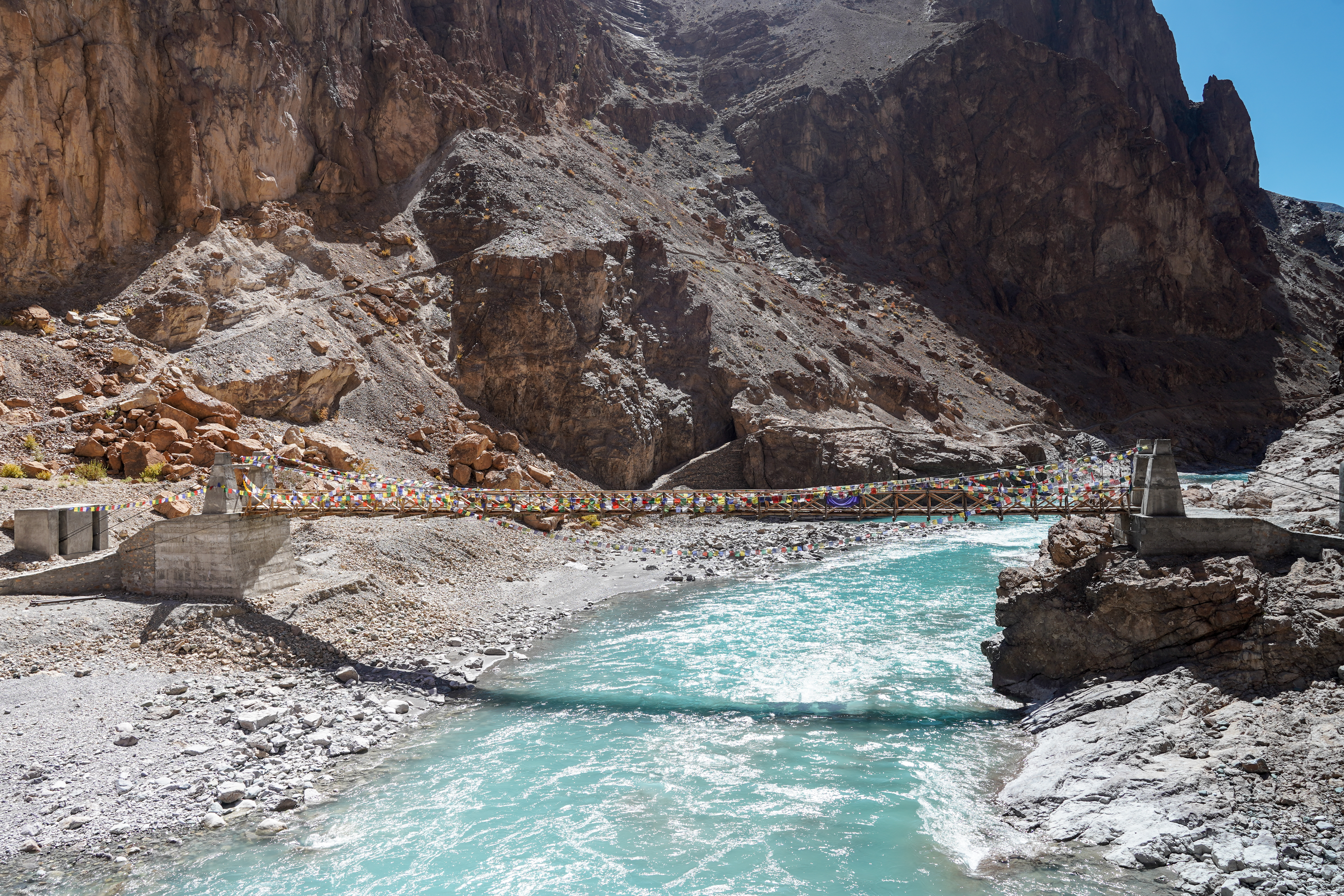
Footbridge over the Tsarap River on the Purne-Phugtal trek.

Phugtal is accessible via a moderate 2-3 hour foot trek along the Tsarap River Valley from Purne (on Nimmu–Padum–Darcha road (NPD Road)), via Cha.

== Tourism ==
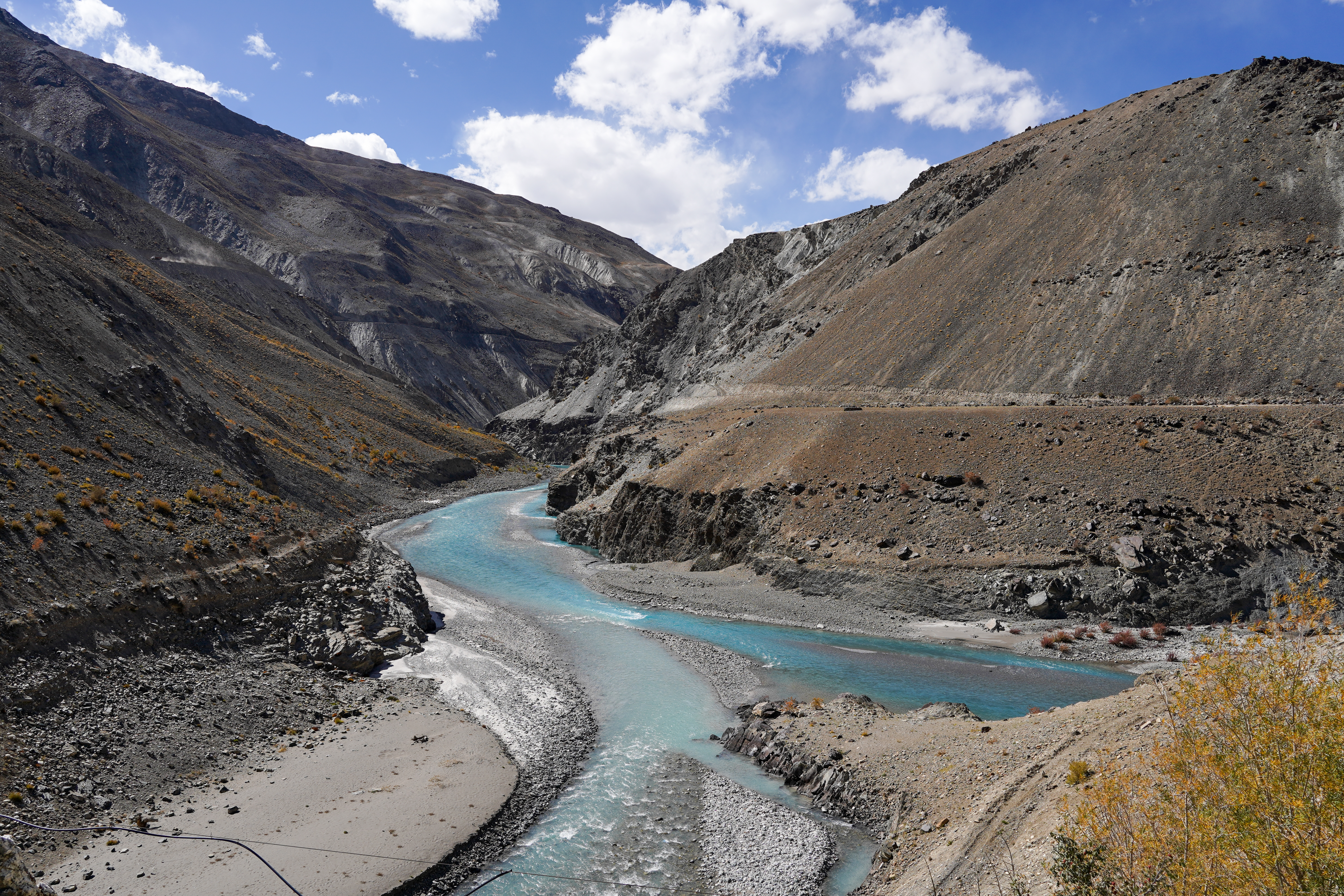
Confluence at Purne: Kargiakh Chu (left) meets Niri Tsarap Chu (right) to form Tsarap Lingti Chu (centre-top, also called the Lungnak river or Tsarap river), c. 4 Oct 2022.

Phugtal offers cave monastery with honeycomb-shaped architecture, ancient Buddhist culture, and deep seclusion. The best time to visit is June–September when the weather is warmer and the trails are accessible. Basic guesthouses and homestays are available in Purne and nearby villages, or inside the monastery by permission. Due to high altitude (3,850+ meters), proper acclimatization is essential before visiting. As of 2026, Phugtal, Tantak and Shade were without motorable road, running water, phone or internet connectivity; Tantak and Shade were also completely off-grid with no electricity.

Phugtal Monastery
Tourism in Phugtal village centers on visiting the remote 12th-century Phugtal Monastery, a "cave of liberation" built into a cliffside along Niri Tsarap River in Ladakh's southeastern Zanskar valley it is a unique cluster of wooden and mud buildings built into the cave with sacred waterfall, housing 70 monks, a library with rare texts, and four prayer halls. Inside this sacred cave, a perennial, protected spring acts as a natural waterfall-like feature, it flows through the rock within the sacred cavern, located near the main temple and prayer rooms, forming an integral part of the meditation area. There is a Monastery Guest House located right at the foot of the Phugtal Monastery cliff, very close to the ceremonial entrance arch, which offers basic rustic guest house run directly by the monks to accommodate visitors with traditional rooms, shared bucket-style washrooms, and communal dining basic vegetarian meals like rice, dal (lentil), or local thukpa (noodle soup).

Tantak Monastery (also spelled "Tan-tak" or "Tang-tak")
It is an extremely remote hermitage located beyond Phugtal along the Niri Tsarap River valley, usually reached by 6–8 hours or 15–20 km northward trekking beyond Phugtal, requiring specialized trekking preparations as it is a deeply secluded location rather than a standard tourist stop, with no conventional electricity or formal lodging or commercial guest houses. Travellers need self-supported camping (carrying your own tents and food) or they must request the highly limited number of resident monks for extremely basic shelter. It is a small "ritro" (hermitage) branch of the main Phugtal monastery, used by monks for more secluded meditation.

Shade (also spelled "Shadey" or "Shadi") village
Further beyond Tantak Monastery, lies a small and even remoter Shadi (Shadey/Shade) village with 10-15 houses, about 5–8 km 2–3 hours further trek into the Niri River side valley (also called "Shade Nala" or "Shade Tokpo") after branching off the main Niri Tsarap River trail to the west of Tantak.

Shade-Zangla trek via Rotang La (4880–4900 meters), Lar La (4,670-4,850 meters) and Pandang La (5,175m) passes
From Shadi village, trek ascends the Niri Chu (Shade Nala) to reach Rotung La 7 km 4–5 hours away, then descends into Mitsik Doksa pasture before ascending to Lar La (crossed same day as Rotung La to reach the pastures at the base of the Niri River valley) further 4–5 km 2–3 hours trek, Pandang La further 16 km 7–8 hours trek along Niri Chu river, Zangla Sumdo (steep descent to the Zumlung Chu river bed and trek follows the river downstream crossing it multiple times) 9–10 km 4–5 hours trek, to Zangla northwest of Shade with another full day of 4–6 hours 7–9 km trek along the narrow Zumlung Chu river gorge requiring over 30 river crossings across the braided tributaries.

Shade-Sarchu trek via Nyalokuntse La (also called "Nialo Konste La", 4,830m) and Gotunta La (5,100m)
Trek from Shade village toward Sarchu requires following Shade Nala to its confluence with Tsarap Chu near Tantak, then along the Tsarap Chu river and into steep side valley of small tributary "Tokphu Nala" to the alpine lakes like Tso Tokphu (last reliable water source), then crossing the Nialo Konste La pass (14 km 5–6 hours trek from Tantak) and Gotunta La (further 15 km 8–10 hours trek). The trek between two passes is most difficult as it combines a massive descent along a ridge into a single grueling 10 hour long day with no established water sources or suitable flat campsites. From Gotunta La, the trek descent 1500m into an unnamed river gorge, then to Tsarap River past the abandoned settlements like Satok, Mune, and Tichip, then ending southeast of Shade at Sarchu on NH3 Leh–Manali Highway where Tsarap River meets the Brandy Nala.

Festivals
Several festivals, such as Smonlam Chenmo (end of February), Yarnas ceremony (late July to mid-September), and Gadam Nagchod (early December), are celebrated.

Wildlife and treks
Phugtal area immediate south of Hemis National Park in Zanskar remains a sanctuary for high-altitude wildlife, including endangered snow leopards, Himalayan blue sheep (bharal), marmots, and the Tibetan wolf. The Lungnak River (also known as the Lingti or Tsarap river) Valley surrounding the cliffside monastery offers critical habitats for these species, with increased wildlife spotting opportunities during the winter months particularly around the Chadar trek area.

== Gallery ==
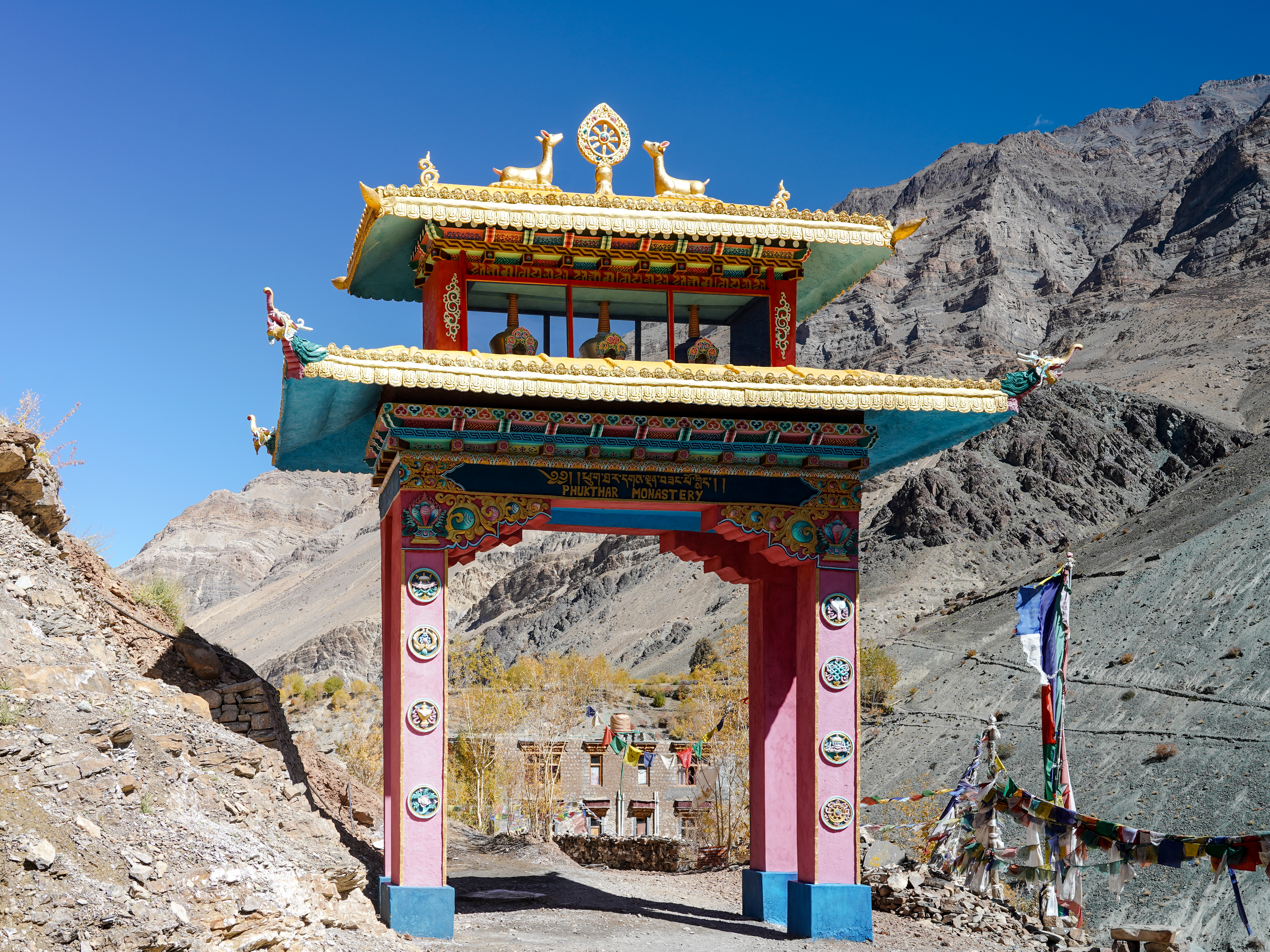
Entrance arch at the foothill of Phugtal Monastery, c. 2022.

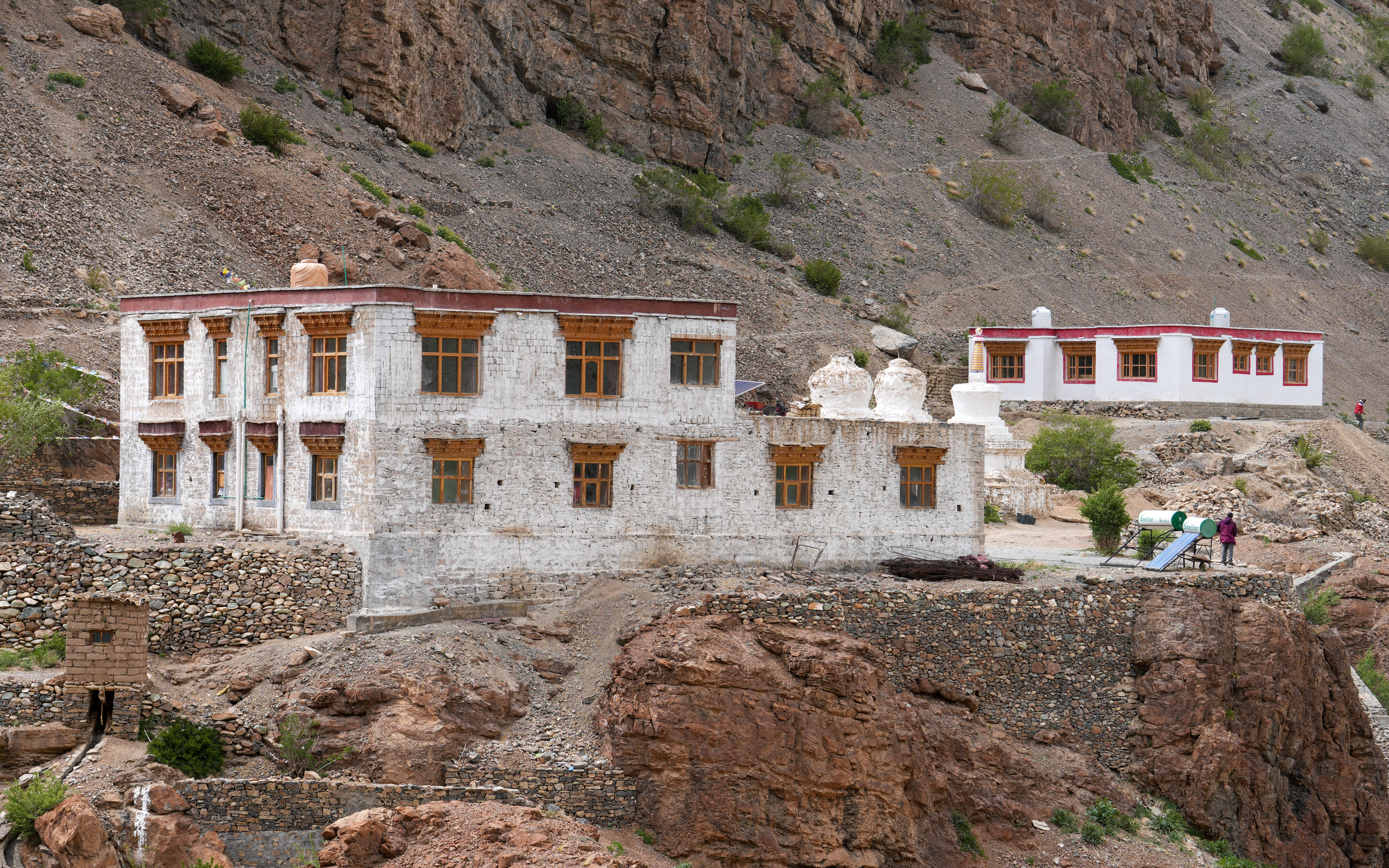
Visitor's guest house maintained by Monastery's monks, view from across the Tsarap River.

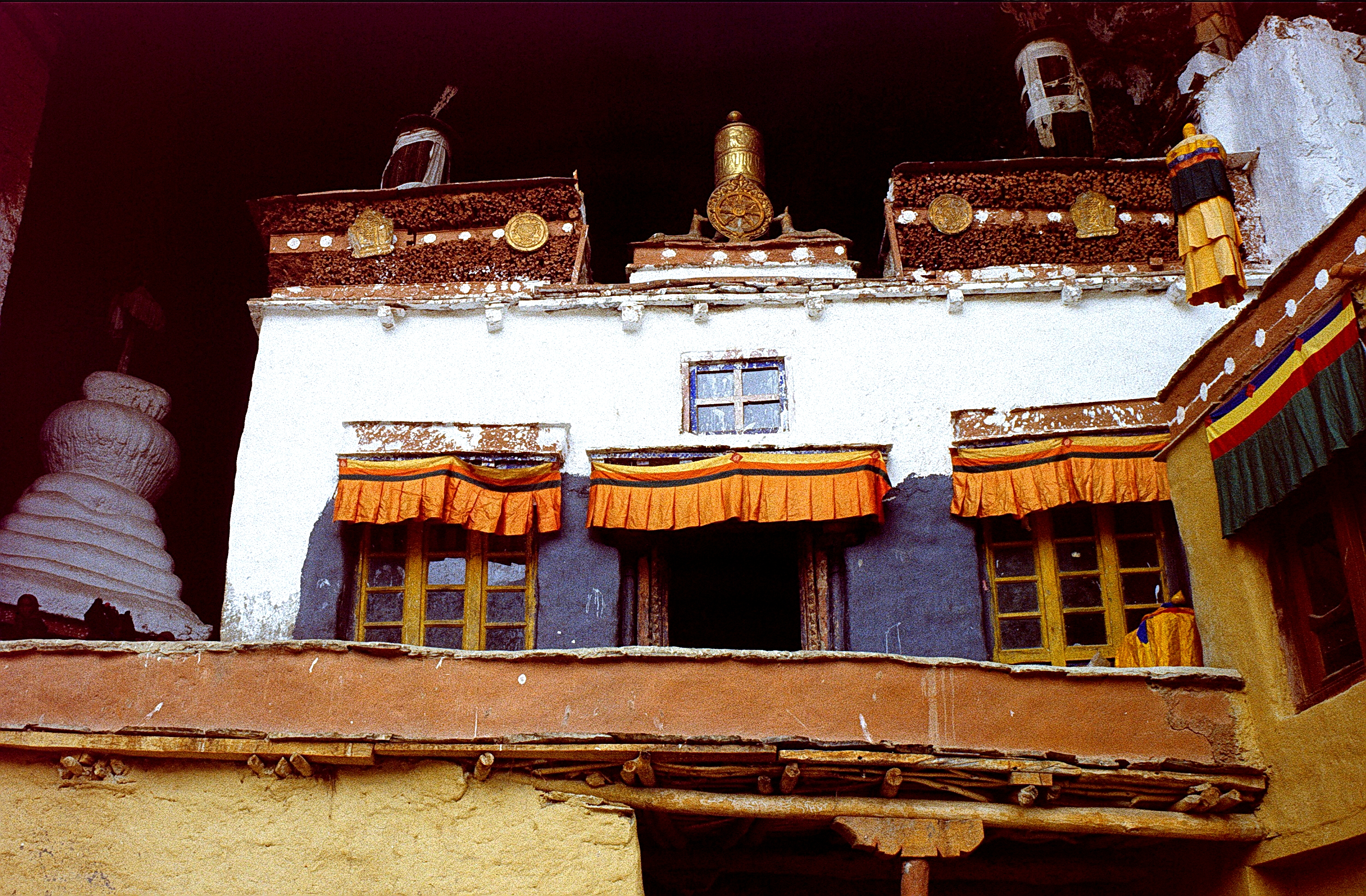
Building and chorten at the cave entrance of Phugtal Monastery, c. 1991.

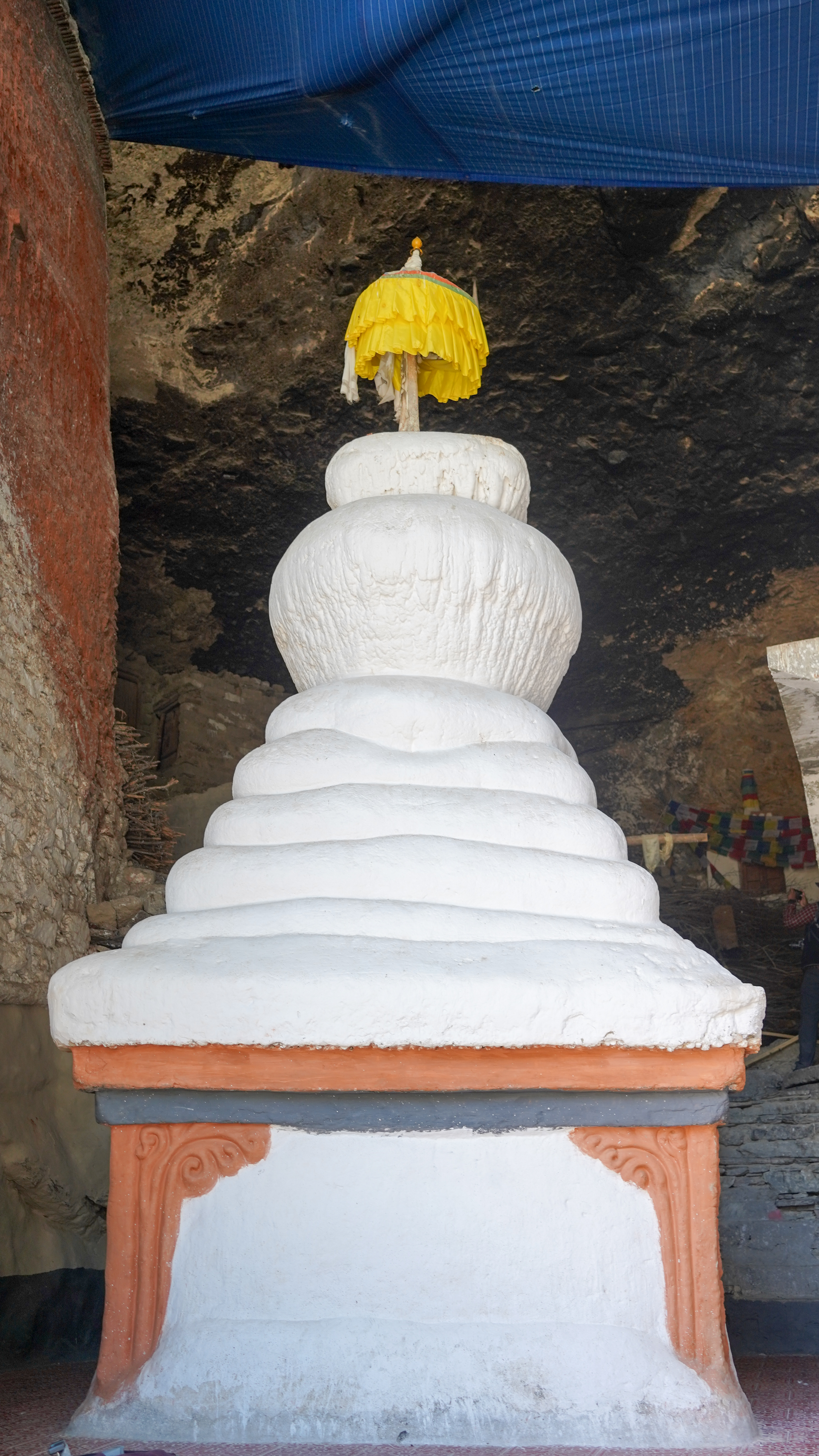
Chorten inside the cave of Phugtal Monastery, c. 2022.

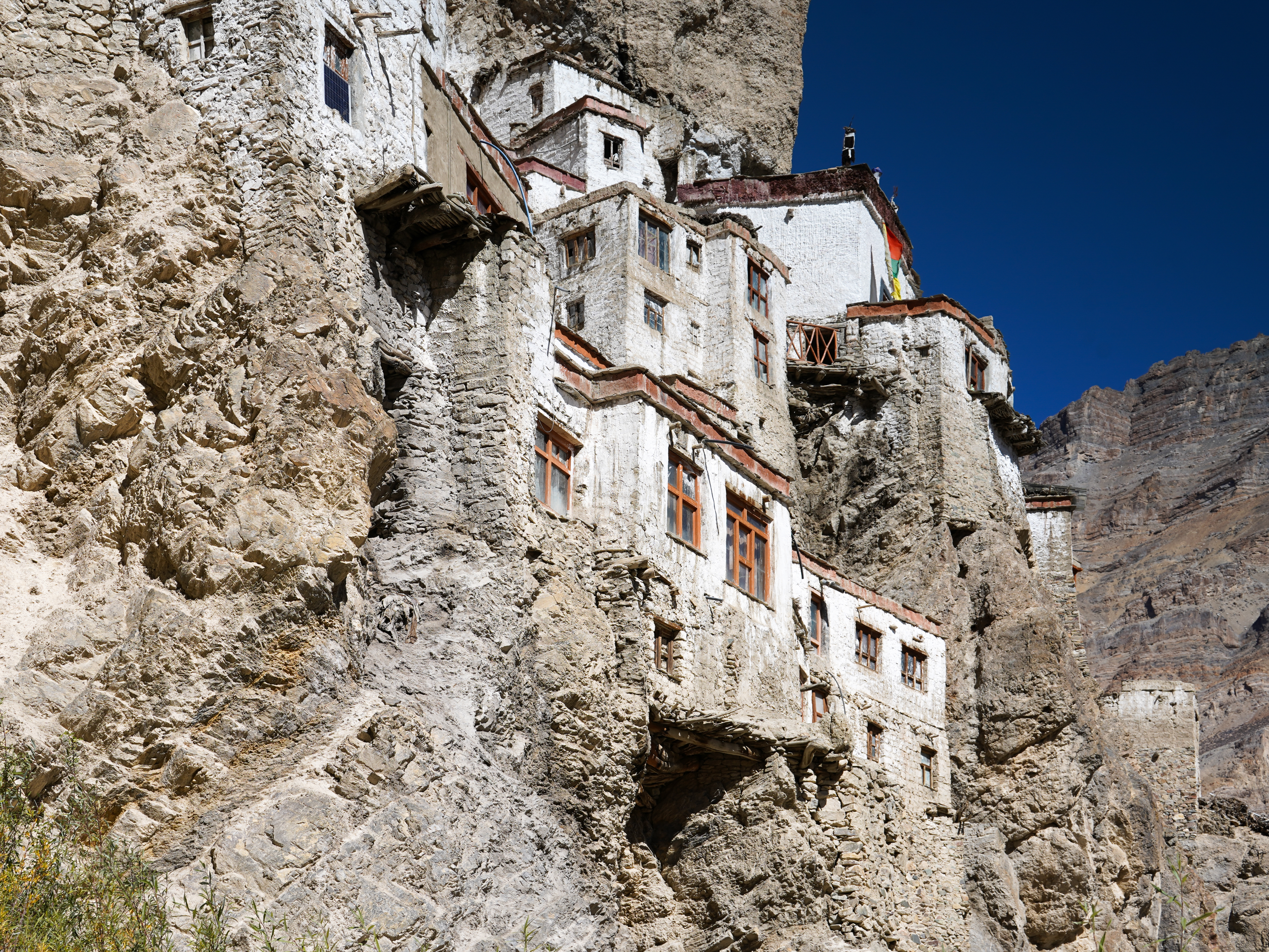
Cliff dwellings below the Phugtal Monastery cave.

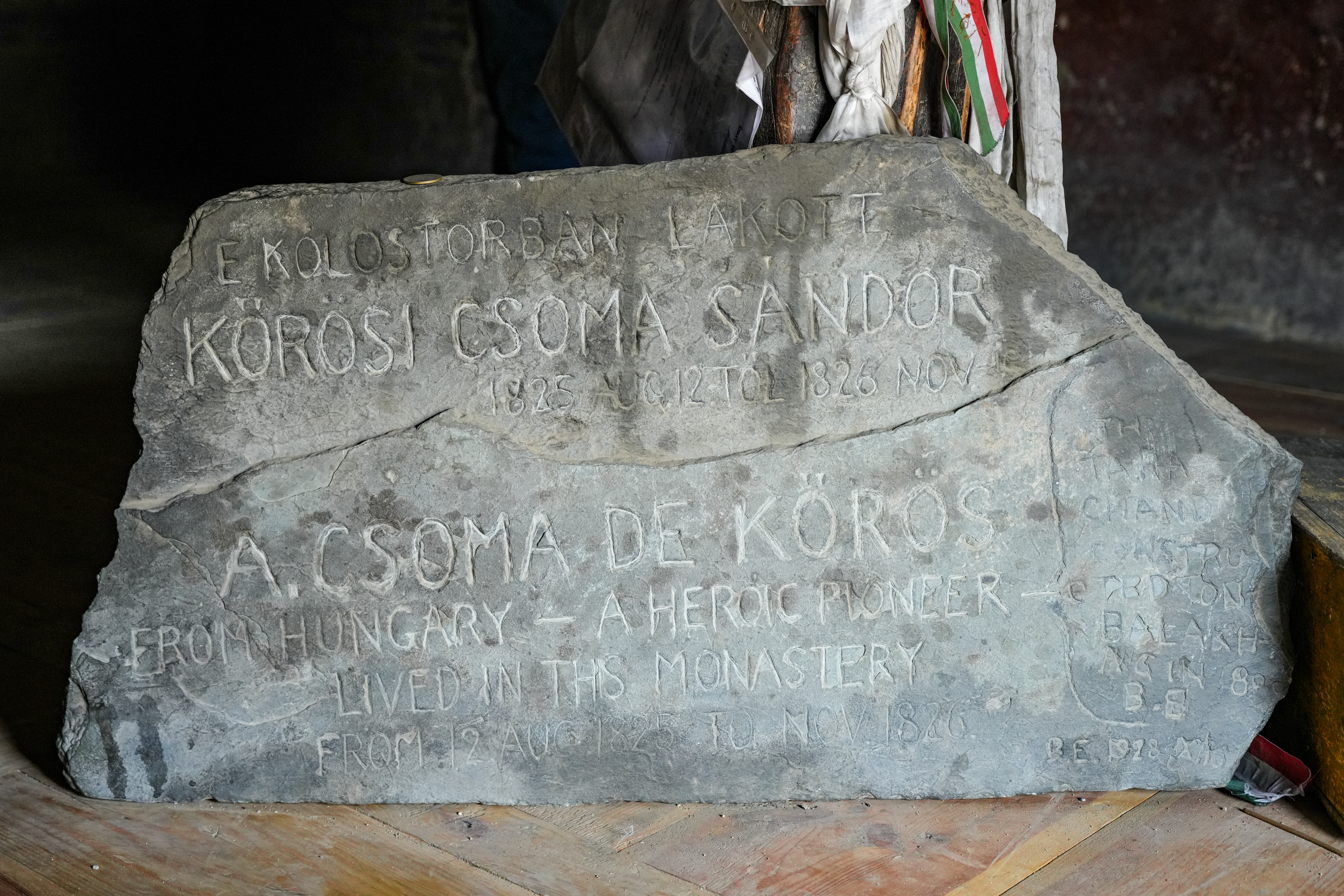
Stone plaque commemorating Sándor Kőrösi Csoma's stay from 12 August 1825 to November 1826.

== See also ==
- List of buddhist monasteries in Ladakh
- Geography of Ladakh
- Tourism in Ladakh
