= Chah, Zanskar =

Chah Cha
- village and Tehsil
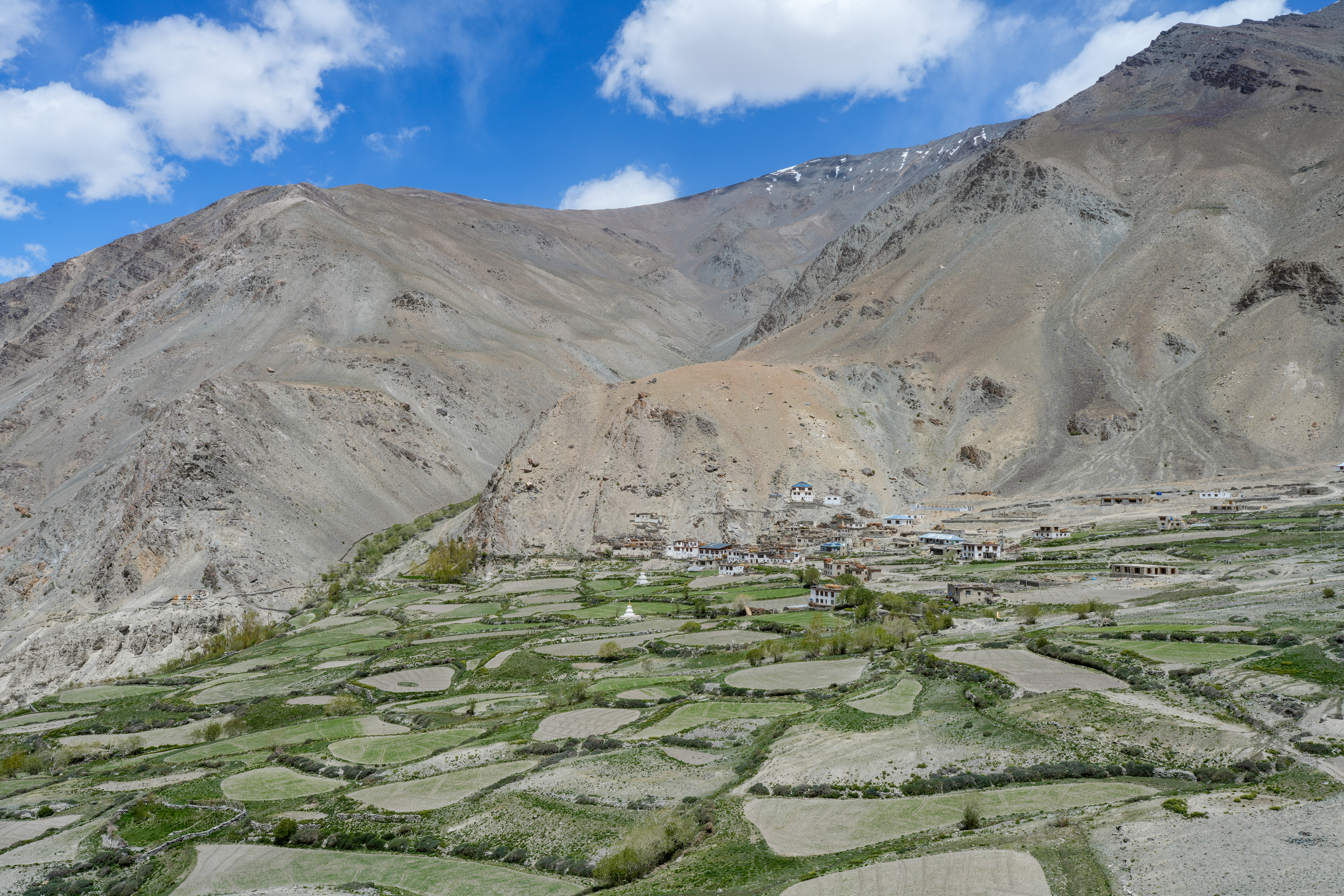
- Chah village, June 2024

- Location within Ladakh
- Coordinates: 33°14′38.25″N 77°07′33.92″E
- Country: India
- State: Ladakh
- Union Territory: Ladakh
- District: Zanskar
- Tehsil: Chah

Area
  - Total: 0.838 km^{2} (0.324 sq mi)
- Elevation: 3,920 m (12,860 ft)

Population (2011)
  - Total: 465
  - Density: 555/km^{2} (1,440/sq mi)

Languages
- Time zone: UTC+5:30 (IST)
- Postal Index Number: 194302

Chah (also Cha) is a small village and one of tehsil in the Lungnak valley, Zanskar district, Ladakh, India. The village is situated at the base of a mountain range on the right bank of the Tsarap River. It is located on the Padum-Darcha road, 47 km (29 mi) south from Padum.

== Description ==
Chah (elevation 3,920 m (12,860 ft)) is a small village in the Lungnak valley on the right bank of the Tsarap River. It is located at a distance of 47 km (29 mi) from Padum on the Padum-Darcha road. The distance from Darcha in Lahaul is 82 km (51 mi), the road climbing over the 5,091 m (16,703 ft) Shinko La pass. Chah village has an area of 83.80 hectares (207.1 acres).

== Demographics ==
The population as of the 2011 Census was 465 with 61 households. Females comprised 40.2% of the population. The literacy rate was 56%. All but 2 of the 465 persons belonged to scheduled tribes.

== Governance ==
The Cha Gram Panchayat is a government office and local self-government body. The villages of Chah and Shunshday (Shan Shaday) come under its jurisdiction. In 2011, the population of these two villages was 709.

== Amenities ==
Chah has a pre-primary and primary school. Household power supply and mobile phone coverage are available. The village has a primary health sub-centre (PHS). There is an India Post branch post office with PIN code 194302.

== Economy ==
The economy is largely agrarian with tourism also providing jobs and income. As the annual precipitation is low, fields are irrigated through channels from streams fed by snow-melt. About 46% of the agricultural land is irrigated.

=== Tourism ===
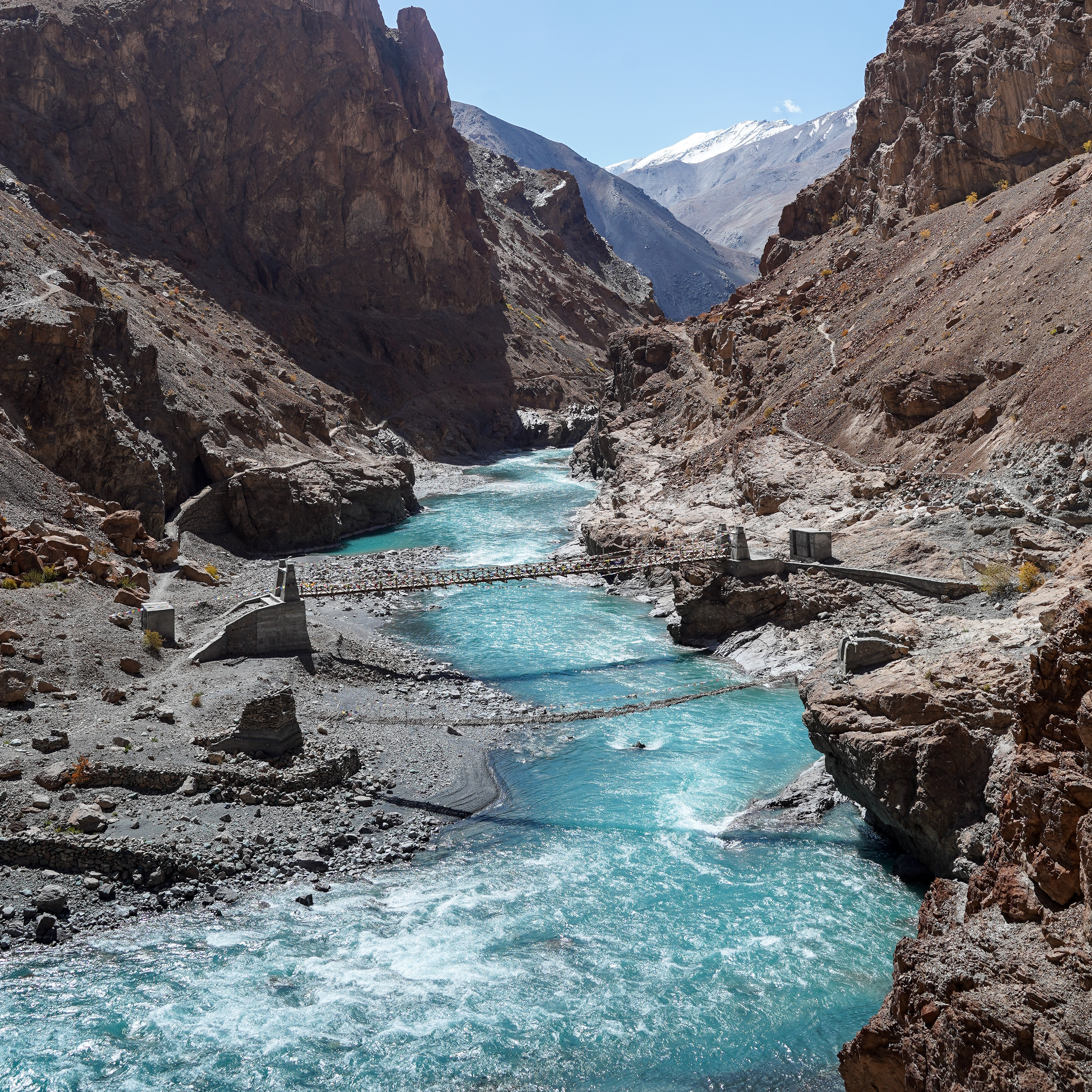
Trail from Chah down to the Tsarap near Phuktal on the right, trail from Purne on the left

From Chah there is a 6 km (3.7 mi) trail to Phugtal Monastery. The trail is difficult in some places. The distance can be covered in 2-3 hours.

== Transport ==
In June 2024, the Himachal Road Transport Corporation (HRTC) announced that it would soon commence a bus service from Keylong in Lahaul to Padum. This would run on the Nimmu-Padum-Darcha road and would serve Chah. Taxis are available.

== See also ==
- Phugtal Monastery
