= Jangsem Sherap Zangpo =

Tibetan Monk (1395–1457)

Jangsem Sherab Zangpo

Jangsem Sherab Zangpo, also known as Jangsem Sherab Sangpo, (1395–1457) was a 15th-century Buddhist monk and teacher, and one of the six contemporary disciples of Je Tsongkhapa, the founder of one of the newest school of Tibetan Buddhism, the Gelug school. He is crediting with establishing the famed Thikse Monastery and the remotely located Phugtal Monastery in Ladakh, in the North Indian state of Jammu and Kashmir.

== Biography ==
=== Birth and early years ===
Jangsem Sherab Zangpo is believed to have been born in 1395 in the village of Stakmo Ladakh India. Some claim that he was born in the village of Bershi, in the Nanchen county of Kham. He was the son of Bege Tongpon Rilu and Akyima.

At the age of seven, he received lay vows from Deshin Shekpa, 5th Karmapa Lama, the fifth Gyalwa Karmapa of the Kagyu school of Tibetan Buddhism. Design was on his way to or from China, gave Jangsen the name, Sherab Zangpo. After deciding to devote his life to religion, went off to study the traditions of the Karma Kagyu school under the Lamas of the Karma Gon Monastery. Choje Chopel Zangpo, a disciple of the first Pakpa Lha and Drukpa Gyelwang Choje, along with Rinchen Pelwai Khenpo, imparted Jangsem his basic education. The two teachers, along with Jamchopa Jamyang Drakpa, taught him sutras and tantra. He trained in particular in texts related to Avalokiteśvara, Vajravārahī, Dharmapala Bernagchen (a form of Mahākāla, Prajñāpāramitā and Bodhisattvacaryāvatāra.

At around the age to twenty-three, Jangsem travelled around Tiber for eleven years, including six years spent at the Ganden Monastery and three at the Drepung Monastery. There, he got the chance to study with Tsongkhapa Lobzang Drakpa, Gyeltsabje Darma Rinchen, Khedrubje Gelek Pelzang and other learned Lamas. Tsongkhapa imparted to him his two main treatises the Lamrim Chenmo and the Ngakrim Chenmo, teachings on logic, Mūlamadhyamakakārikā, extensive commentary on the Guhyasamāja Tantra, the commentary on the Kalachakra Tantra of Vimalaprabha, the Cakrasaṃvara Tantra and Naro Cho Druk.

He also trained in the Jonang school of Tibetan Buddhism, working with Sonam Rinchenpa and Tsetang Shakya Sanggye. Jangsem also trained with Sakya lamas and studied the collected works of Sakya Pandita.

=== Propagation of Buddhism ===
Urged by his teachers, Jangsem returned to Kham in 1426, along with a lot of disciples. He travelled the Kham region, forging ties with the local religious and political leaders, and spreading Buddhism, and performing, rituals at monasteries such as the Kyoda Monastery of the Sakya tradition. He taught the Lamrim Chenmo and the Ngakrim Chenmo, Kala Chakra, Guhyasamāja, and other texts. In 1437, at the request of his disciples, he set up the important Gelug monastery, Chamdo Chokhor Jampa Ling, also known as Kelden Jampa Ling, at the confluence of two tributaries of the Mekong, Ngomchu and Dzachu. It grew to be the largest Gelug monastery in Kham.

In the early 15th century, Je Tsongkhapa instructed Jangsem and five of his other disciples to Ladakh to spread Buddhism. Jangsem was given a small statue of Amitayus (the sambhogakāya form of Amitābha), containing bone powder and a drop of Tsongkhapa's own blood, and asked to carry a message for the King of Ladakh, seeking his help in the propagation of Buddhism in the area. The King, who was then staying in the Nubra Valley near Shey, loved the gift of the statue. After this meeting, the King directed his minister to help Jangsen to establish a monastery of the Gelug order in Ladakh. As a result, in 1433, he founded a small village monastery called Lhakhang Serpo "Yellow Temple" in Stagmo, north of the Indus. This was the beginning of the famous Thikse Monastery. In the mid-15th century, Palden Zangpo, a disciple of Jangsem, continued the monastic work started by his teacher and expanded the monastery.

Jangsem is also credited with establishing the present Phuktal Monastery in the early 15th century. The eminent scholars and brothers Dangsong, Pun, and Sum, who were believed to have the supernatural power of flight gave teachings on Dharma at Phuktal. When Jangsem Sherap Zangpo arrived at Phuktal, the three brothers bequeathed the holy site to him and departed. According to legend, the spiritually gifted Zangpo caused a spring to appear and run from the cave, a tree to grow on top of the cave and for the cave itself to grow larger in size. Then, under his guidance, the present structure of the monastery was built around the cave. It is built in the cliffside, like a honeycomb. The cliff is part of a lateral gorge of a major tributary of the Lungnak River (Lingti-Tsarap River). The monastery today is home to about 70 monks and houses a main temple, prayer rooms, a library with rare sacred texts, apartments and living quarters, teaching facilities, a kitchen, and of course, the original cave and the sacred spring, which is protected.

Jangsem Sherab Zangpo died in 1457 at the age of sixty-three.
