= Purne =

Village in Ladakh, India

Coordinates: 33.2344932°N 77.1442721°E

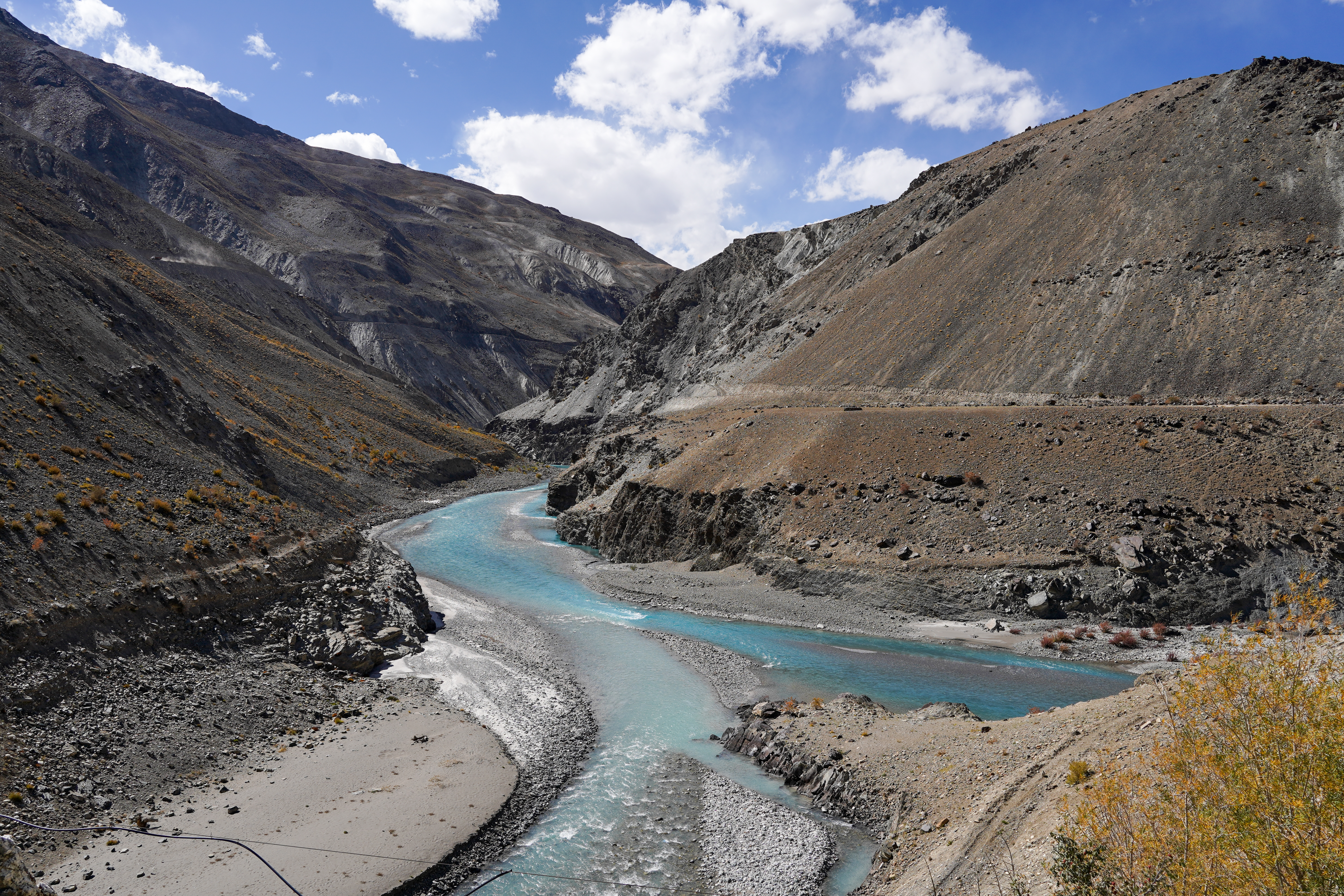
Confluence at Purne: Kargiakh Chu (left) meets Tsarap river (right) to form Tsarap Lingti Chu (centre-top, also called the Lungnak river or Niri Tsarap Chu), c. 4 Oct 2022.

Purne, on the confluence of Kargiakh Chu and Niri Tsarap Chu which form the Tsarap River (also called the Lungnak river or Tsarap Lingti Chu), is a village on Nimmu–Padum–Darcha road (NPDR) in Ladakh in India.

== Tourism ==
Purne is the main base, with homestay and other tourist facilities, for treks to Phugtal Monastery along Niri Tsarap River valley, and beyond to remote Tantak Monastery (also spelled "Tan-tak" or "Tang-tak") also in the Niri Tsarap River valley, Shade (also spelled "Shadey" or "Shadi") village in the "Shade Nala" ("Shade Tokpo"), Shade-Zangla trek, Shade-Sarchu trek, Chadar trek, and Hemis National Park.

== Gallery ==
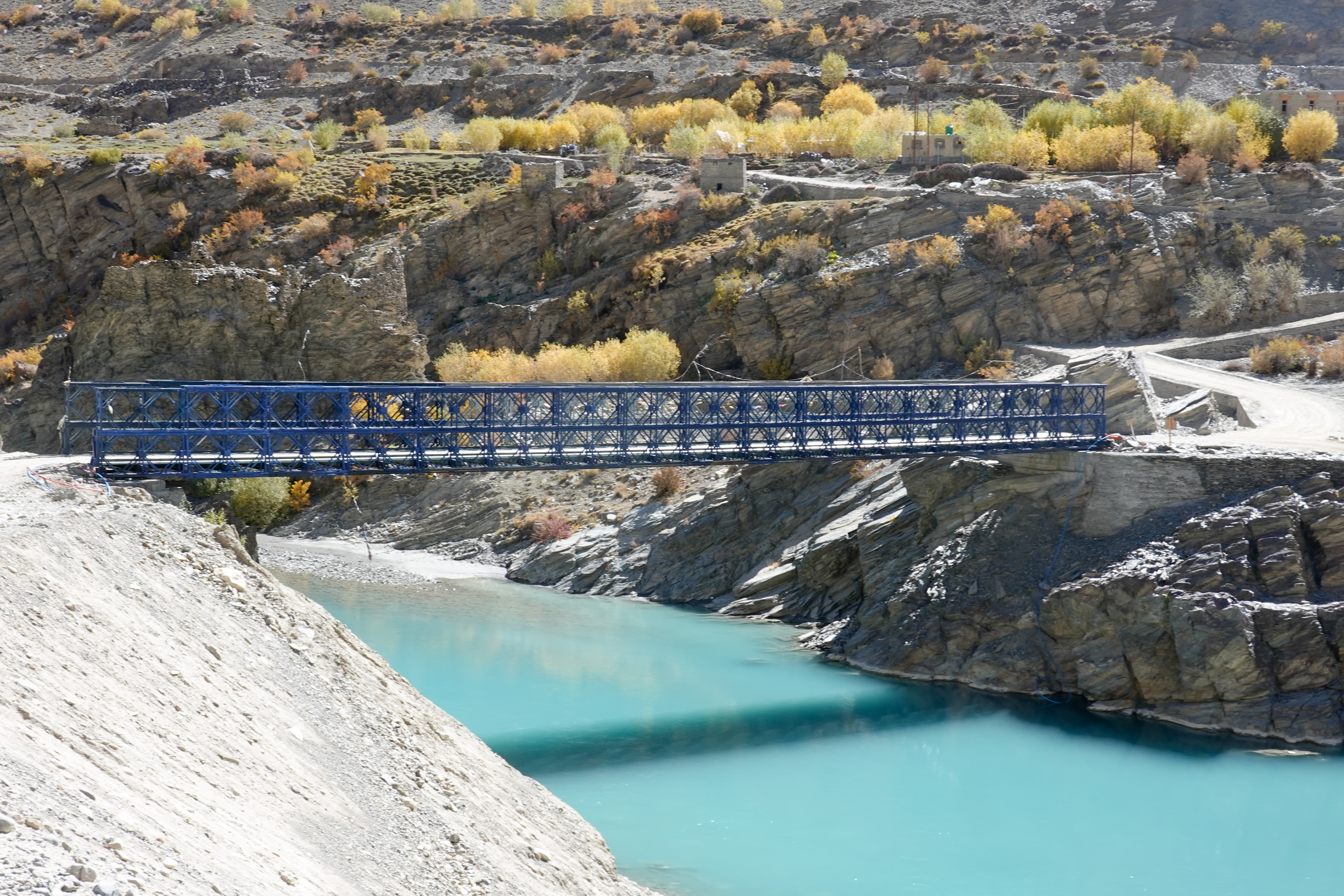
Bridge across the Tsarap River at Purne.

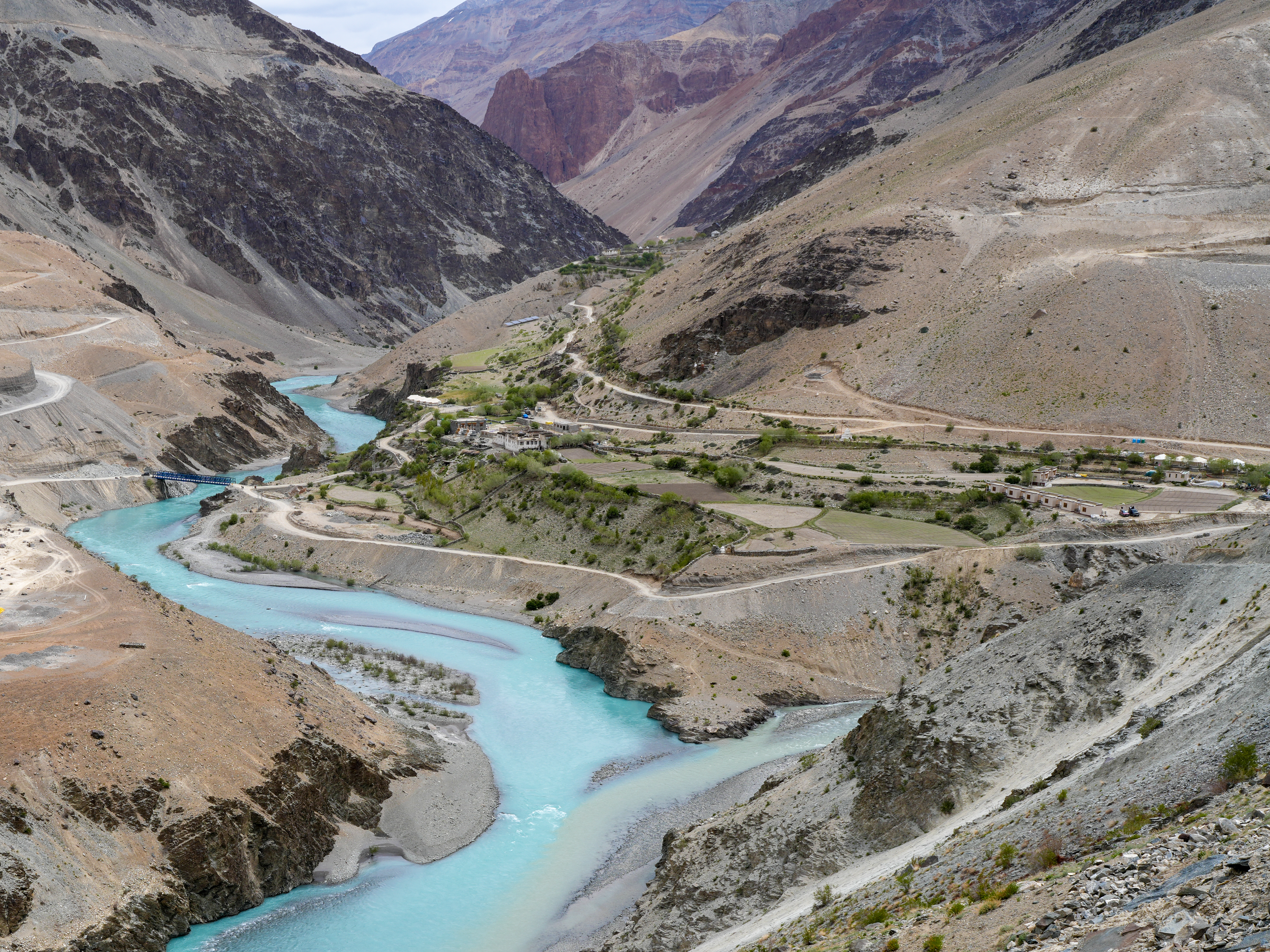
Purne village on the banks of Tsarap River.

== See also ==
- Geography of Ladakh
- Tourism in Ladakh
