= Chiling Sumda =

Chiling Sumda Chilling
- Village
- Location in Ladakh, India Chiling Sumda (India)
- Coordinates: 34.0667°N 77.2167°E
- Country: India
- Union Territory: Ladakh
- District: Leh
- Tehsil: Leh
- Elevation: 3,346 m (10,978 ft)

Population (2011)
  - Total: 223
- Time zone: UTC+5:30 (IST)
- Vehicle registration: JK10
- Census code: 864

Chiling Sumda is a village in the Leh district of Ladakh, India. It is located Nimmu–Padum–Darcha road (NPDR) or Zanskar Highway in the Leh tehsil, on the bank of the Zanskar River in Zanskar region. It serves as a base camp for the Chadar Trek in the winters and is used to raft the Zanskar river in the summers.

== Demographics ==
According to the 2011 census of India, Chiling Sumda has 31 households. The effective literacy rate (i.e. the literacy rate of population excluding children aged 6 and below) is 59.31%.

Demographics (2011 Census)
	Total	Male	Female
Population	223	120	103
Children aged below 6 years	19	12	7
Scheduled caste	0	0	0
Scheduled tribe	220	118	102
Literates	121	68	53
Workers (all)	132	71	61
Main workers (total)	13	4	9
Main workers: Cultivators	0	0	0
Main workers: Agricultural labourers	1	1	0
Main workers: Household industry workers	0	0	0
Main workers: Other	12	3	9
Marginal workers (total)	119	67	52
Marginal workers: Cultivators	104	53	51
Marginal workers: Agricultural labourers	0	0	0
Marginal workers: Household industry workers	0	0	0
Marginal workers: Others	15	14	1
Non-workers	91	49	42

== See also ==
- Geography of Ladakh
- Tourism in Ladakh
