= Chadar trek =

Winter trail in Ladakh in India

Coordinates: 33°46′19″N 76°50′43″E

Chadar Trek
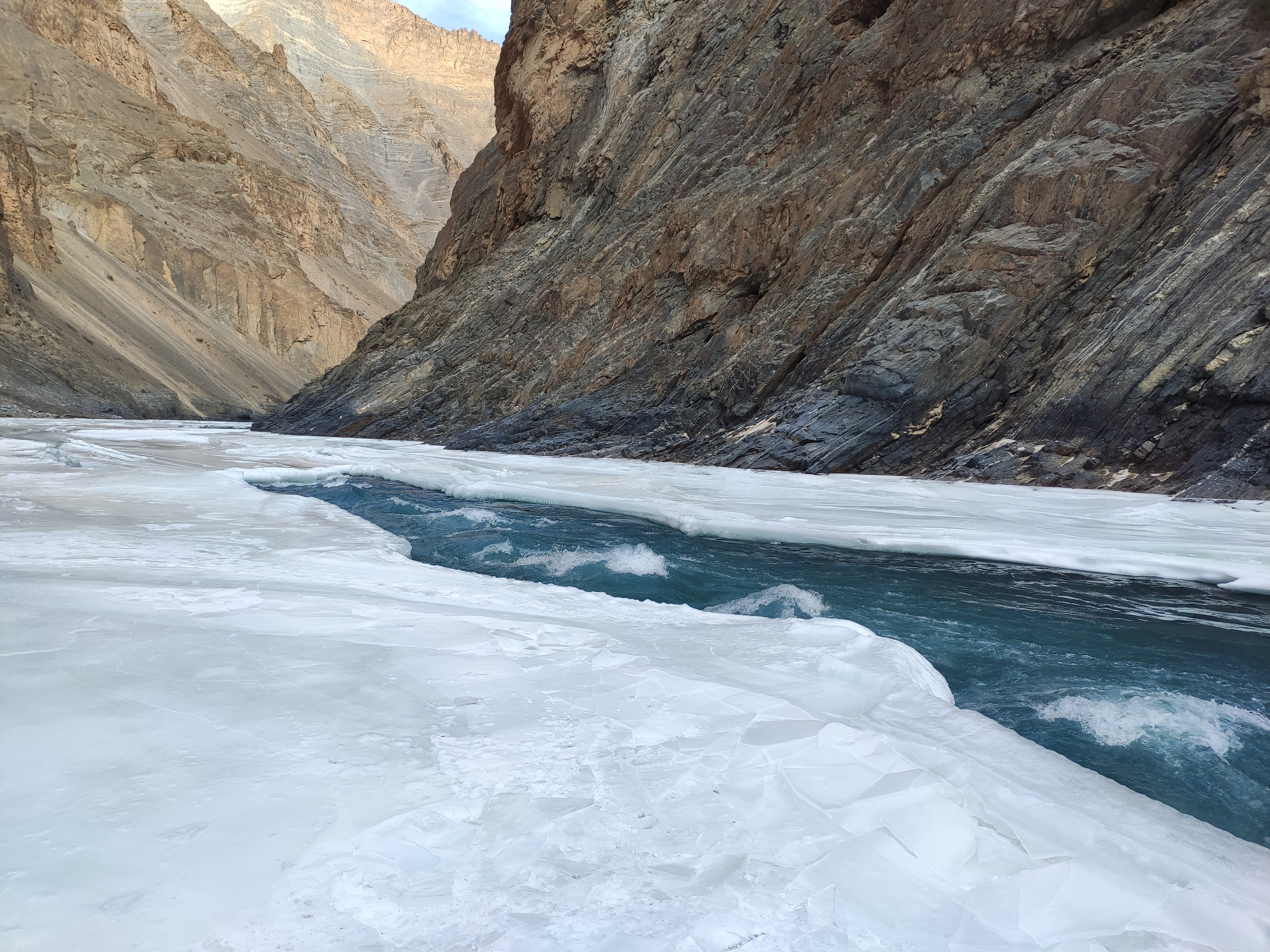
- Chadar: Frozen Zanskar River
- Length: Approx. 65 miles (105 km) One way
- Location: Ladakh, India
- Designation: Chadar Trek
- Trailheads: Chilling
- Use: Hiking
- Difficulty: Extreme
- Season: January to February
- Sights: Zanskar
- Hazards: Severe cold

Zanskar is a tributary to the Indus River.

The Chadar Trek or the Zanskar Gorge trek is a winter trail over the frozen Zanskar River, which lies in the Indian union territory of Ladakh. It is traditionally the only means of travel in the area during the harsh winter months. The trail has become popular with foreign adventure tourists.

== Trail ==
The walls are near vertical cliffs up to 600 m high and the Zanskar River (a tributary of the Indus) flows in a narrow gorge that is only 5 metres (16 ft) wide in places.

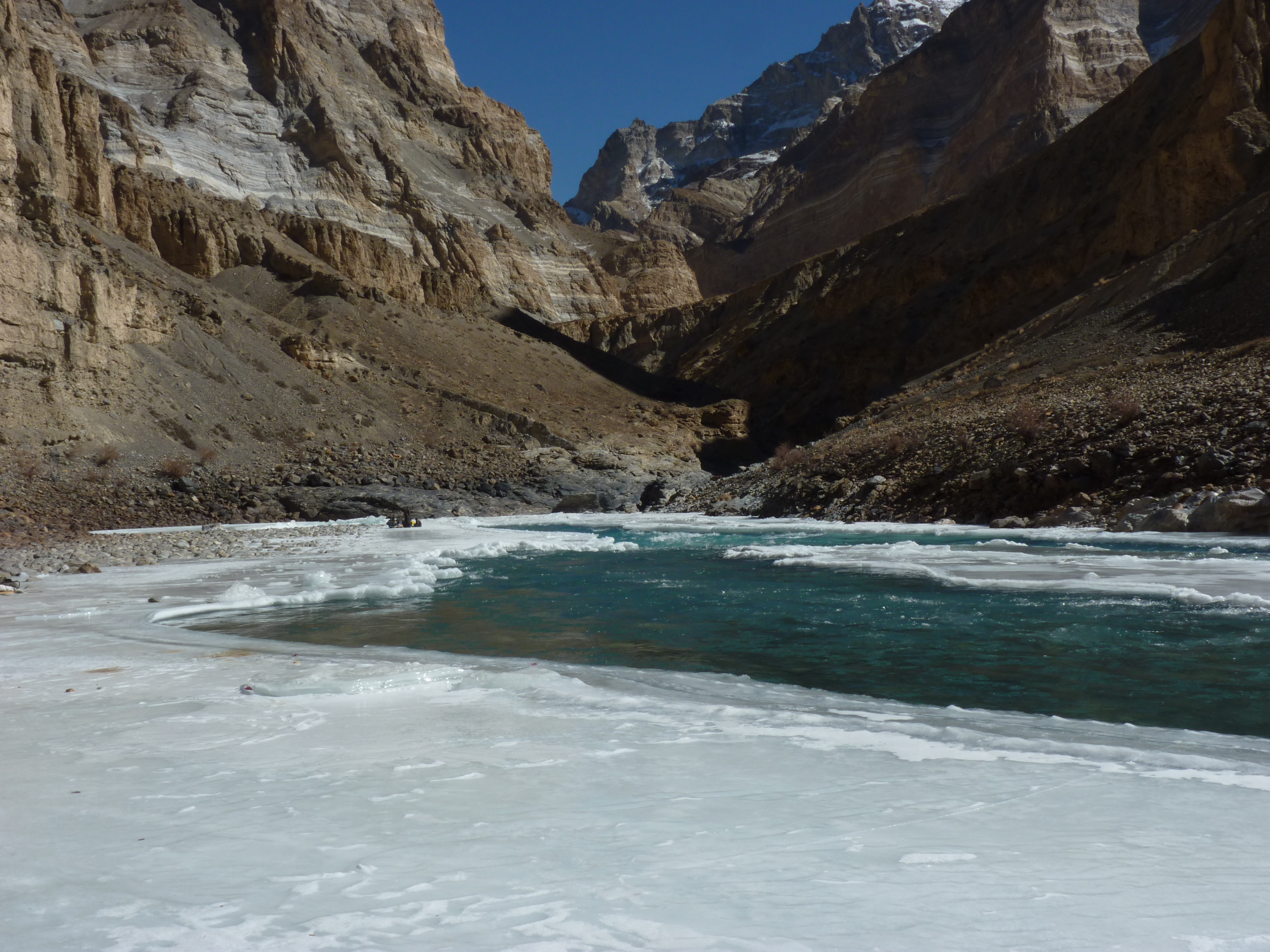

The overall distance is approximately 105 kilometres (65 mi) – an average trekker walks 16 kilometres (10 mi) per day.

The best time to do the Chadar trek is January to February, when the temperature during the winters drops sometimes to -30 to -35 degrees.

Chadar trek starts from Chilling however with time the organisers tend to drive ahead to about 1 km away from the first camp at Tilad Sumdo (10,390 ft) or motorable Shingra Koma. Over the next days the trek moves to higher camps via Tsomo Paldar and Tibb cave to Nerak (11,150 ft). Nerak is the frozen waterfall and the return point of the trek, after this trekkers traverse back to the Shingra Koma starting point. There are other variations of the trek which go until Lingshed, while a bigger version goes to Padum over almost 14 days.

== Modern road ==
A road (Nimmu–Padam–Darcha road/ NPD Road, Nimmu is 35 KM from Leh on NH 1) is under construction by Border Roads Organization (BRO), under Ministry of Defense, to maintain year round connectivity between Leh and Zanskar (HQ- Padum) and is expected to complete in couple of years. The locals have been demanding this road, especially to answer medical emergencies during winter. The road construction has disturbed the local wildlife, primarily the snow leopard. It used to be its prime territory for the snow leopards in the winter, but now they dwell up higher in the valley.

== Gallery ==
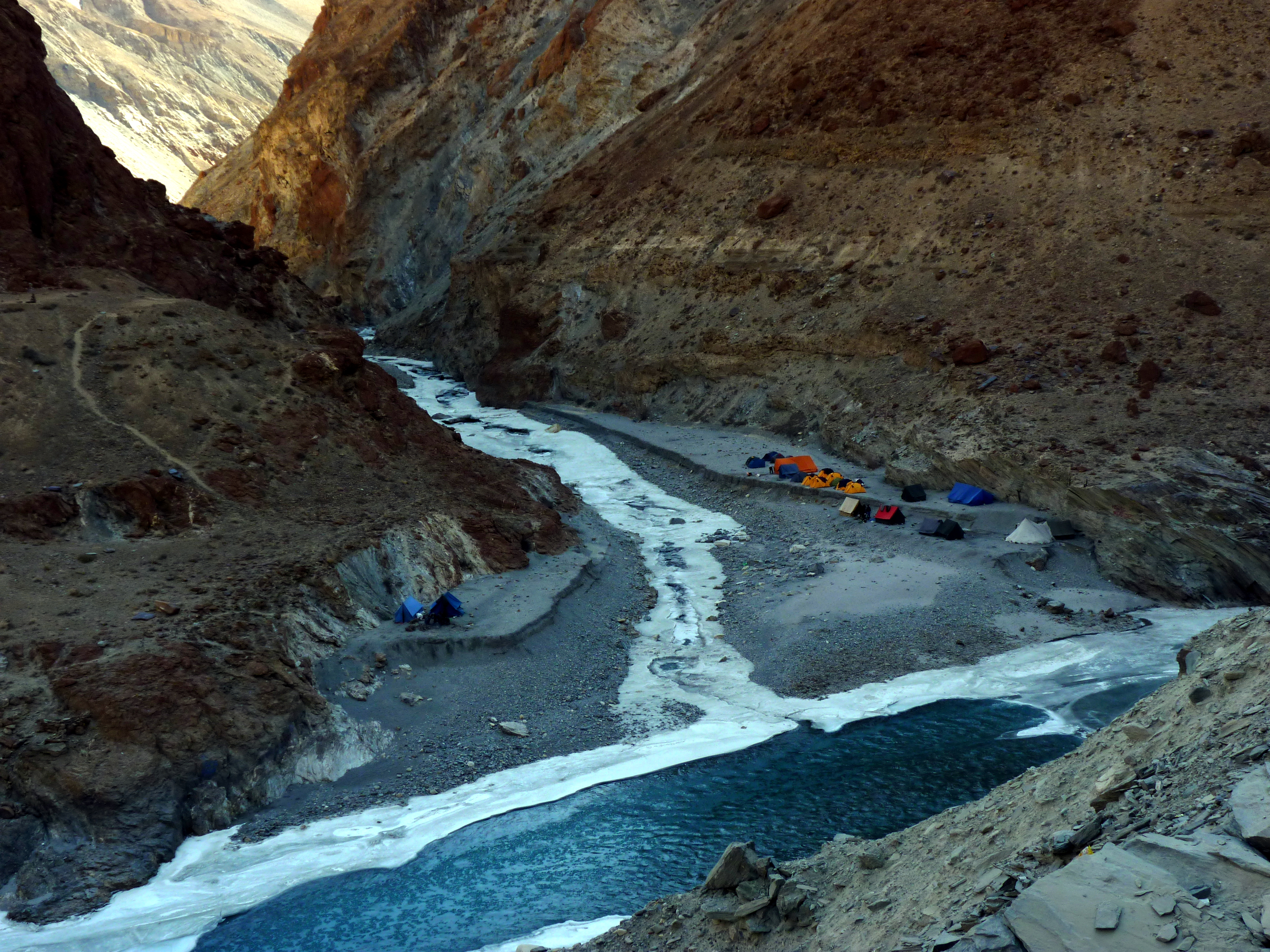
Tilat Sumdo

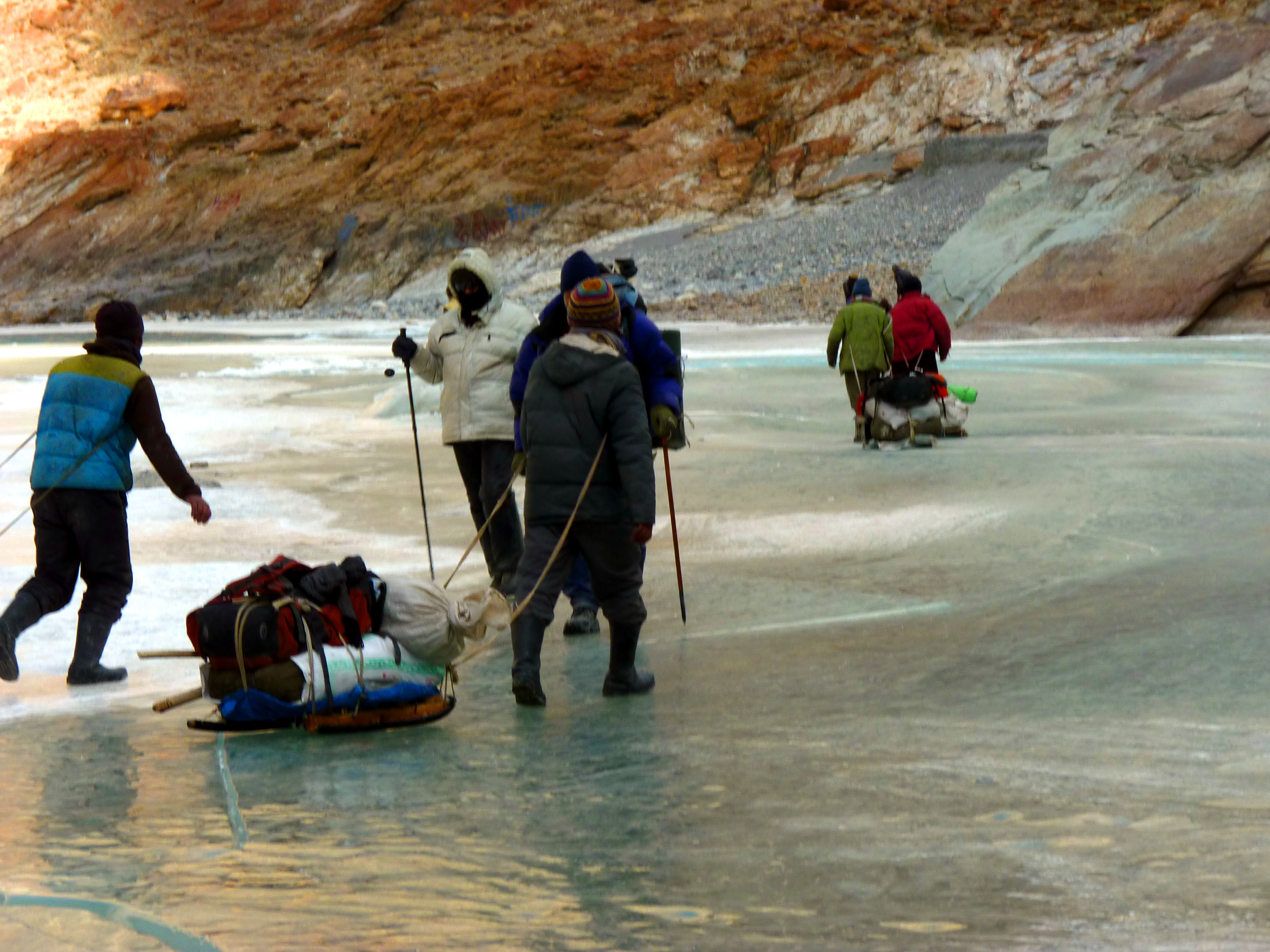
Improvised Sledge on chadar

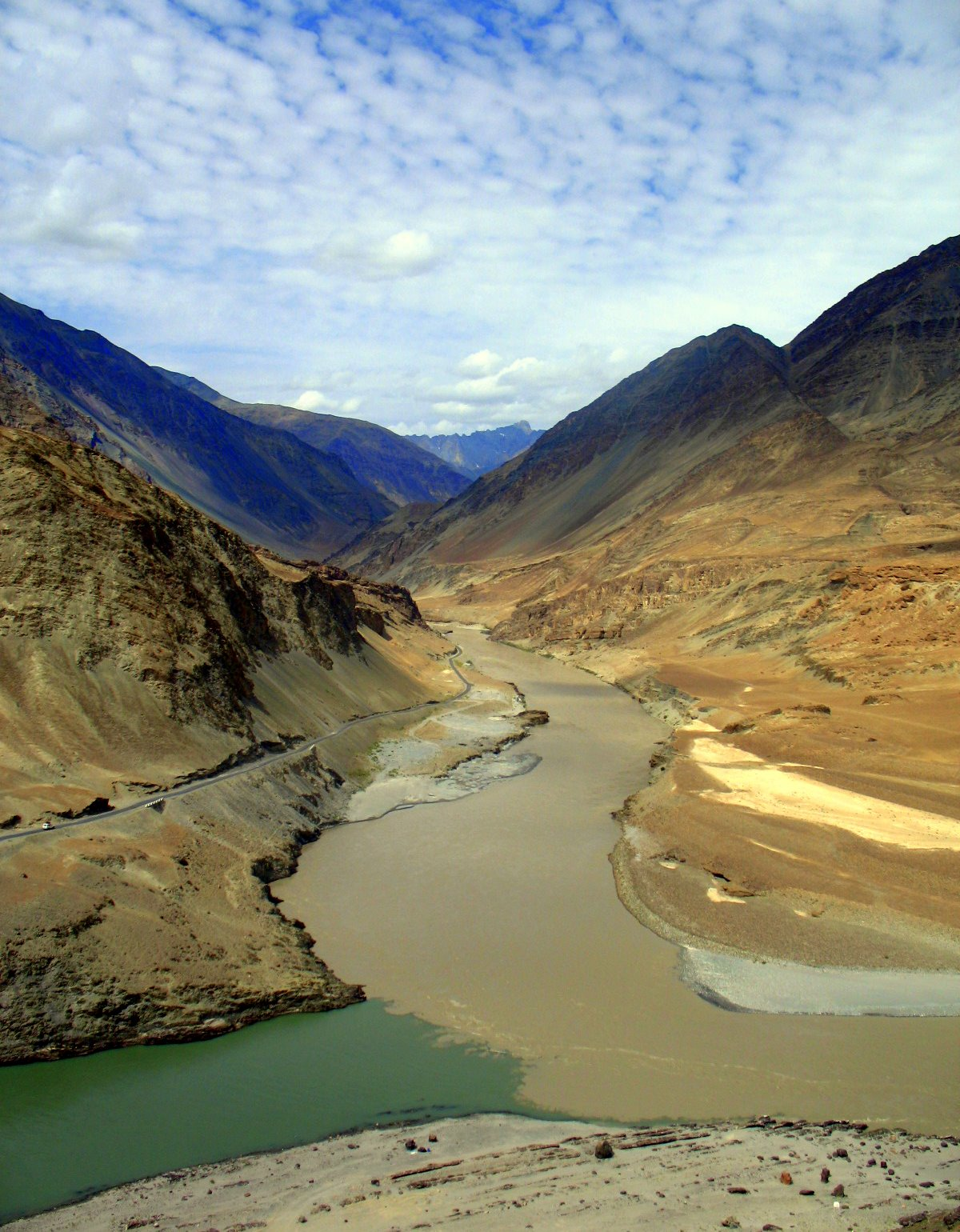
Indus and Zanskar confluence.

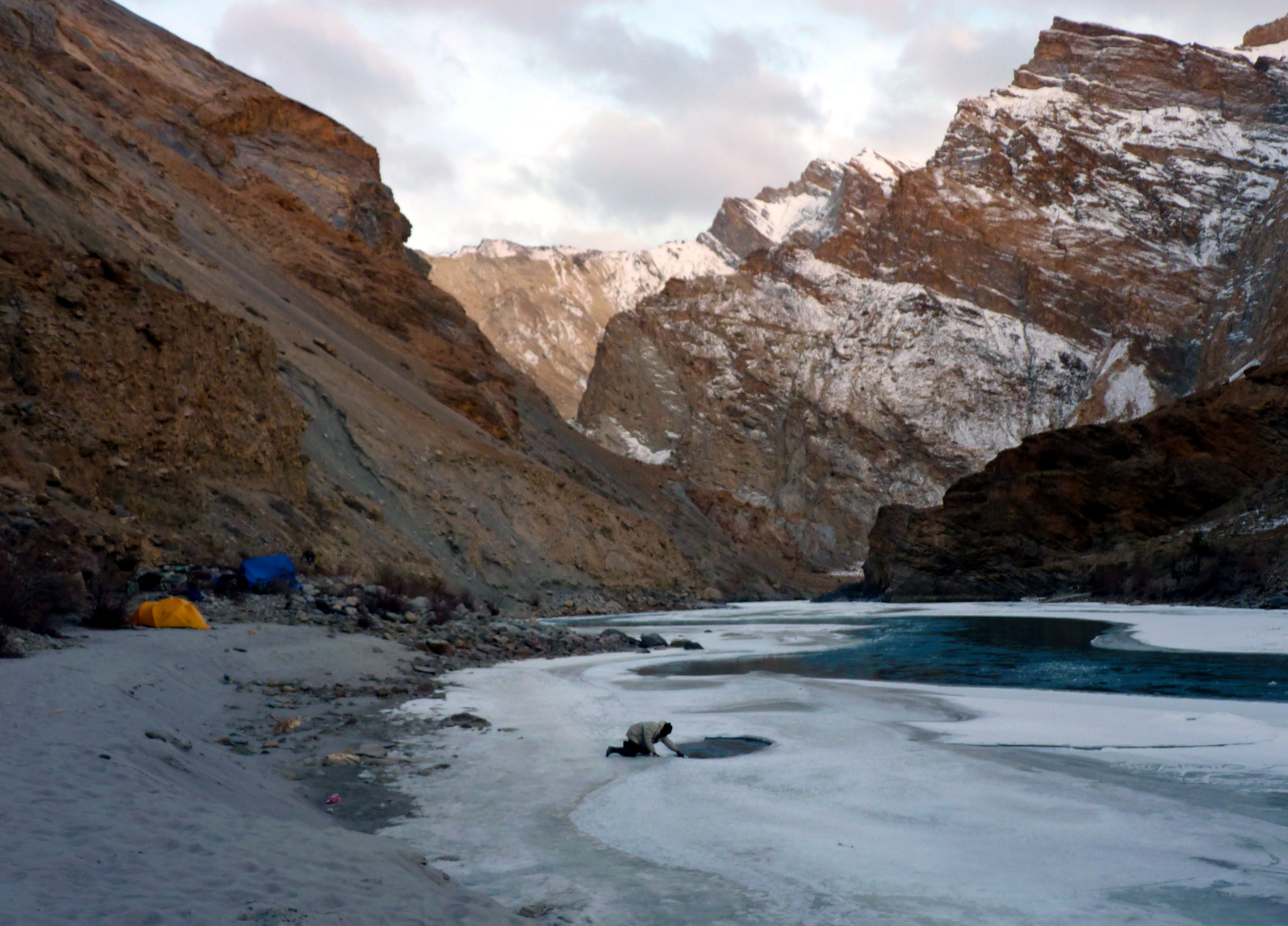
First night camp on a sandy beach opposite Bakulo cave

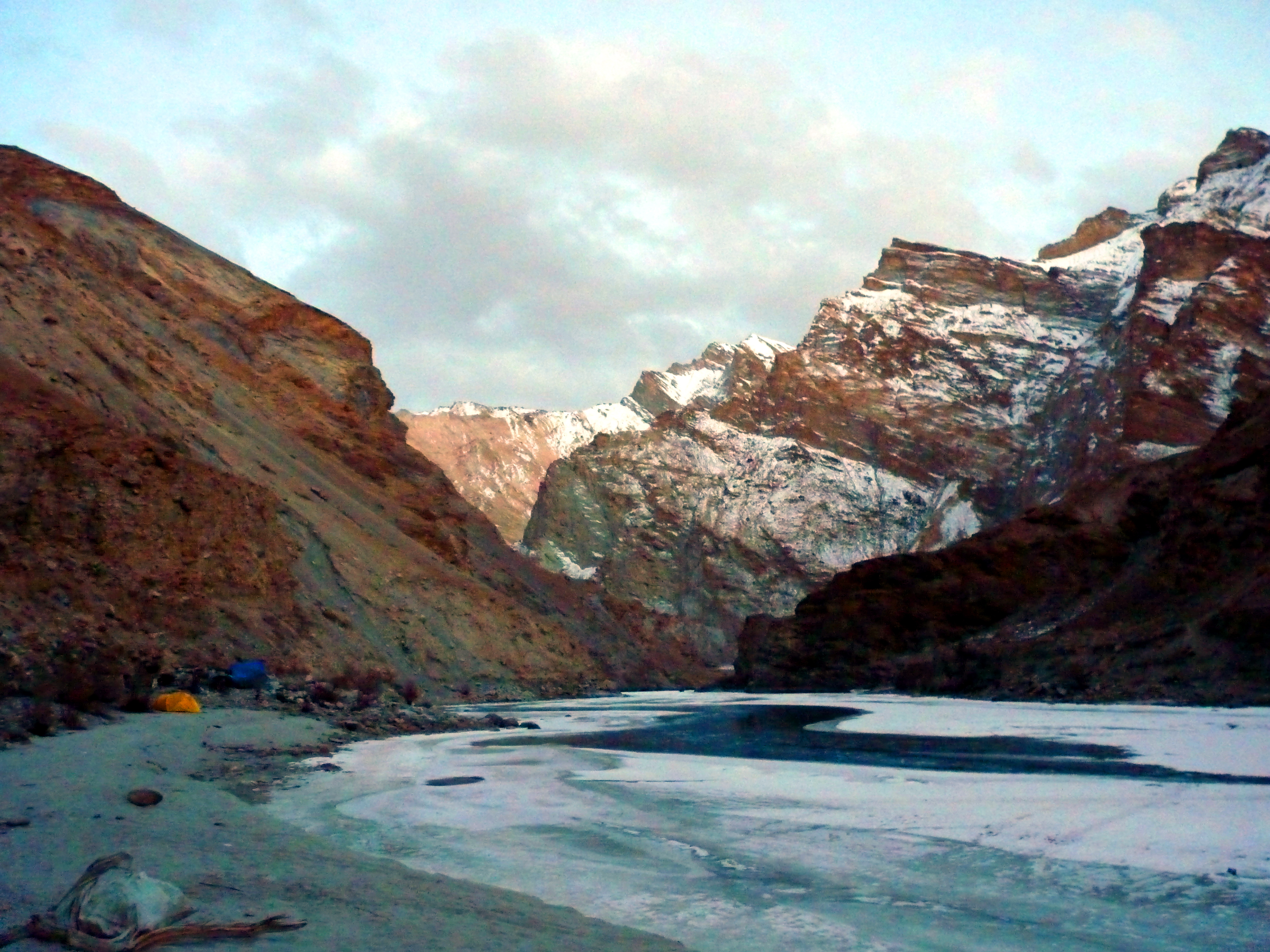
Clear day in Chadar

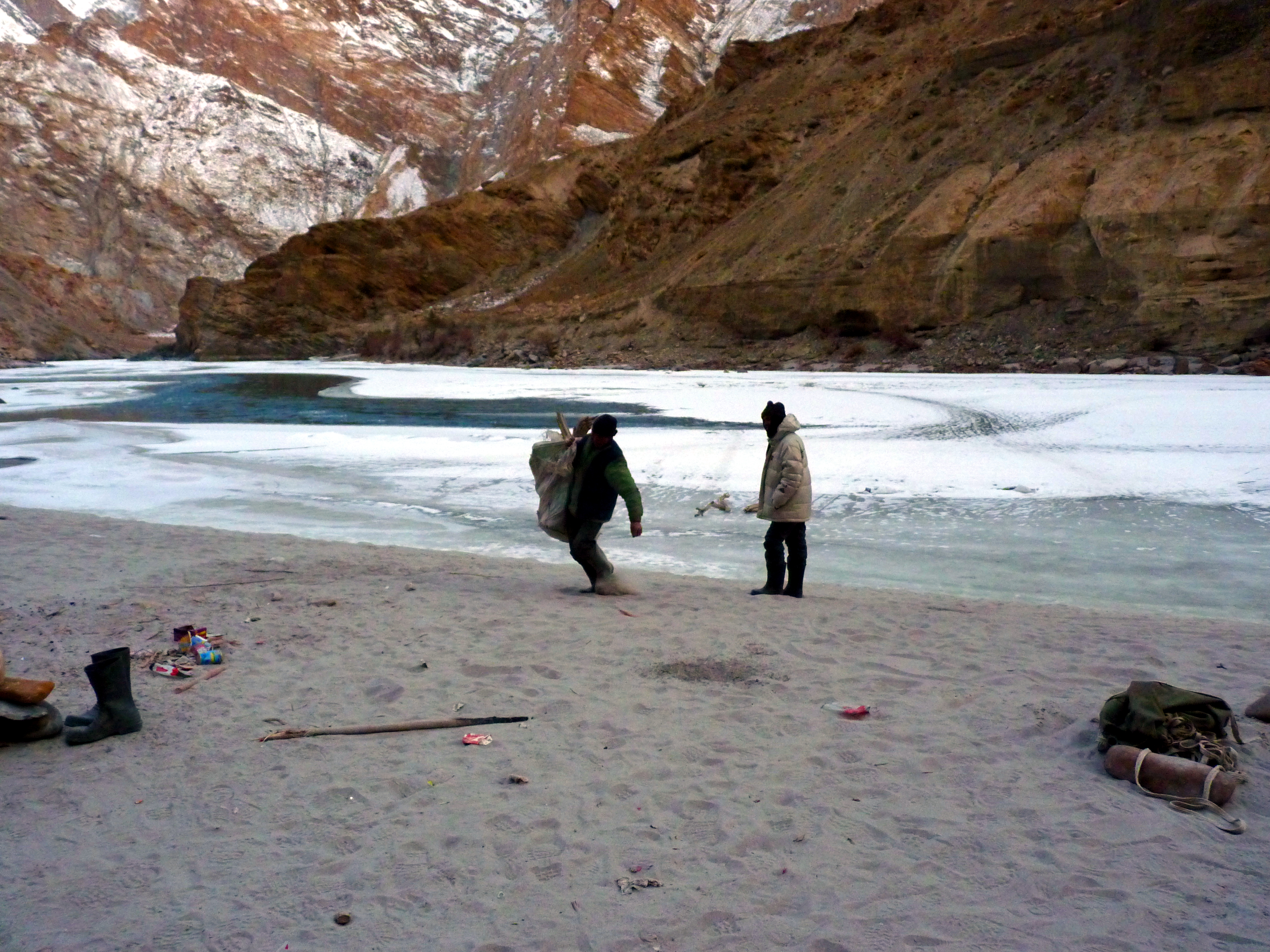
Porters are collecting drift wood for fire

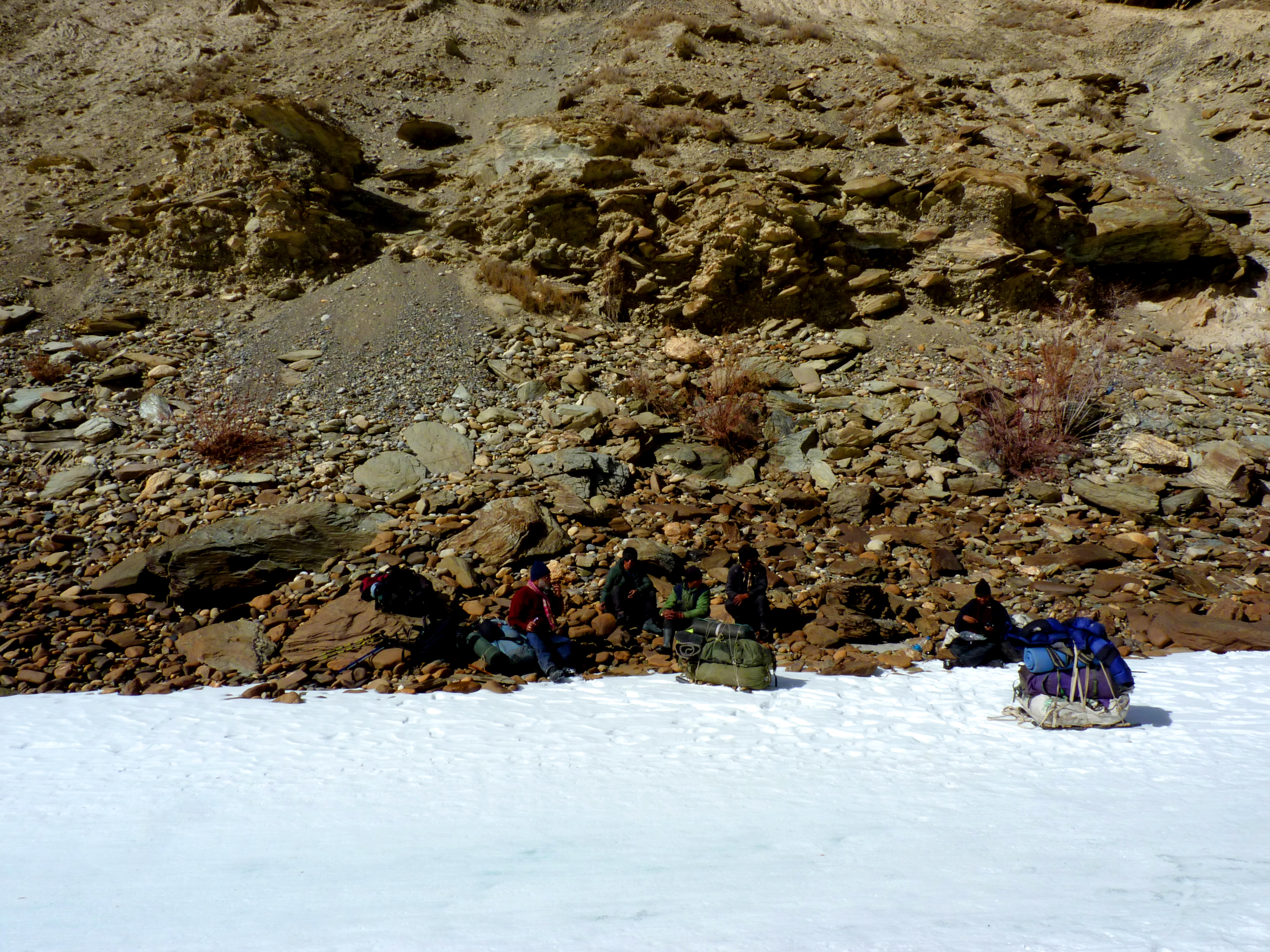
Resting moments of chadar

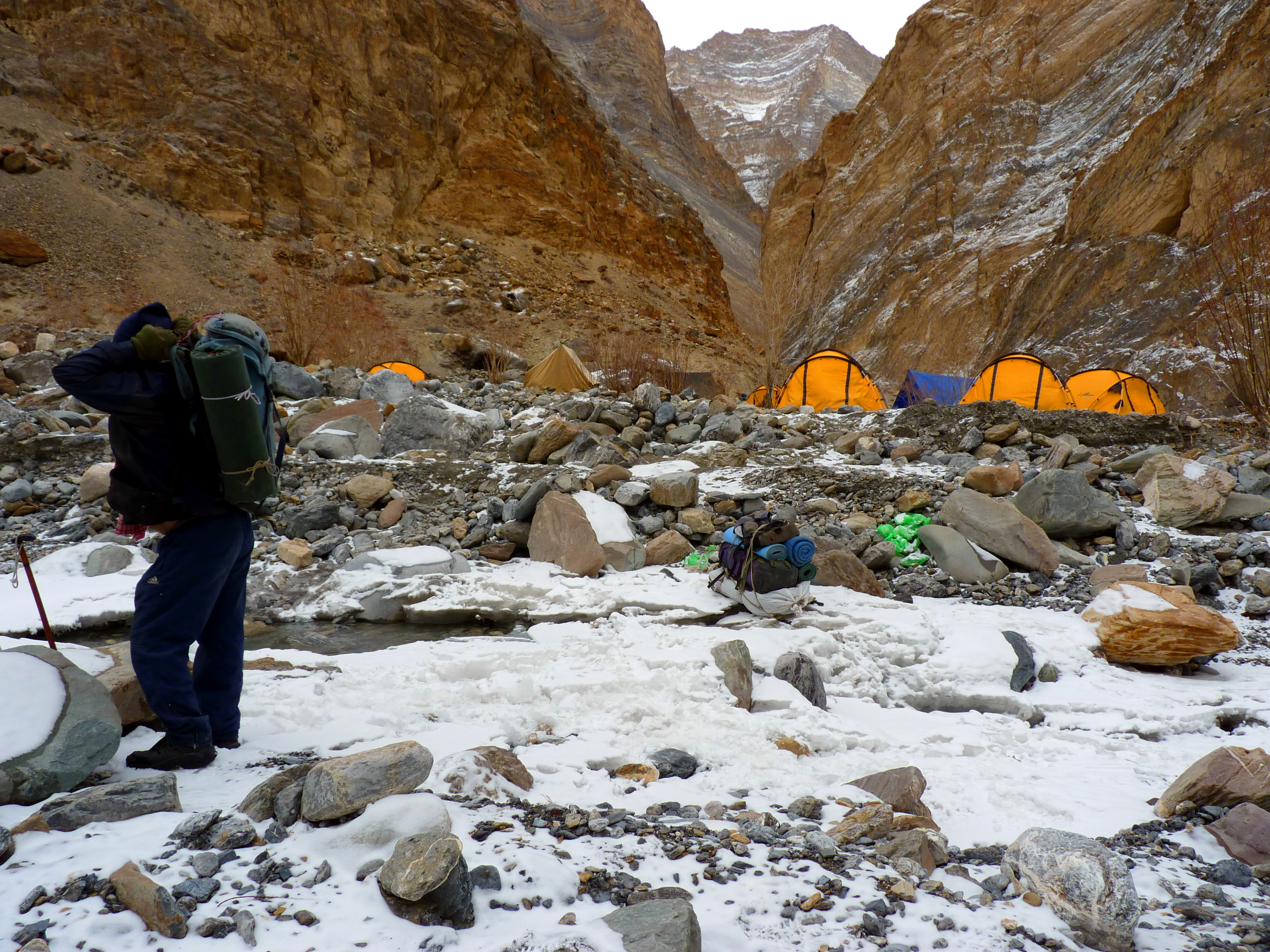
Near Tibb camp

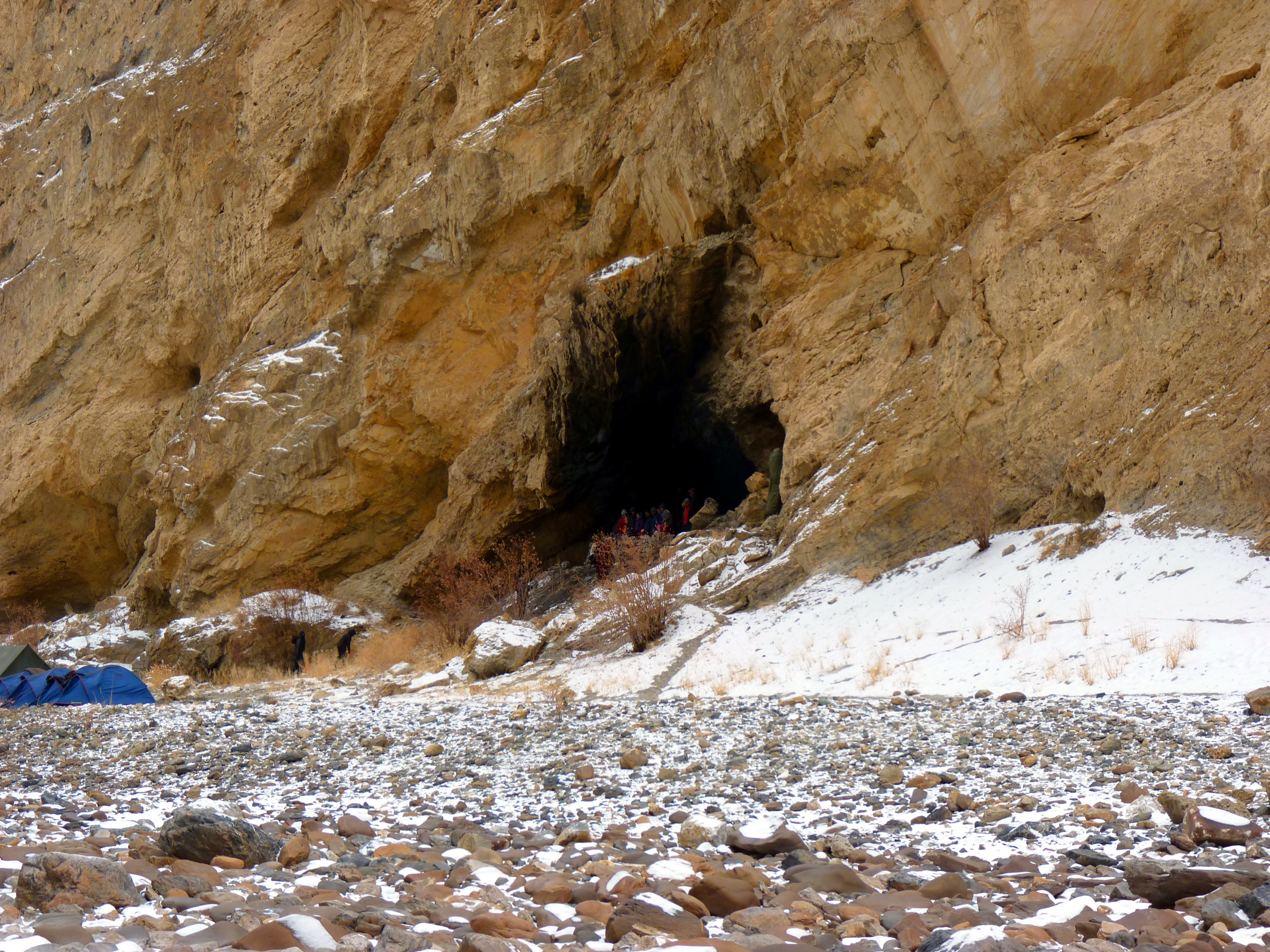
Tibb camp

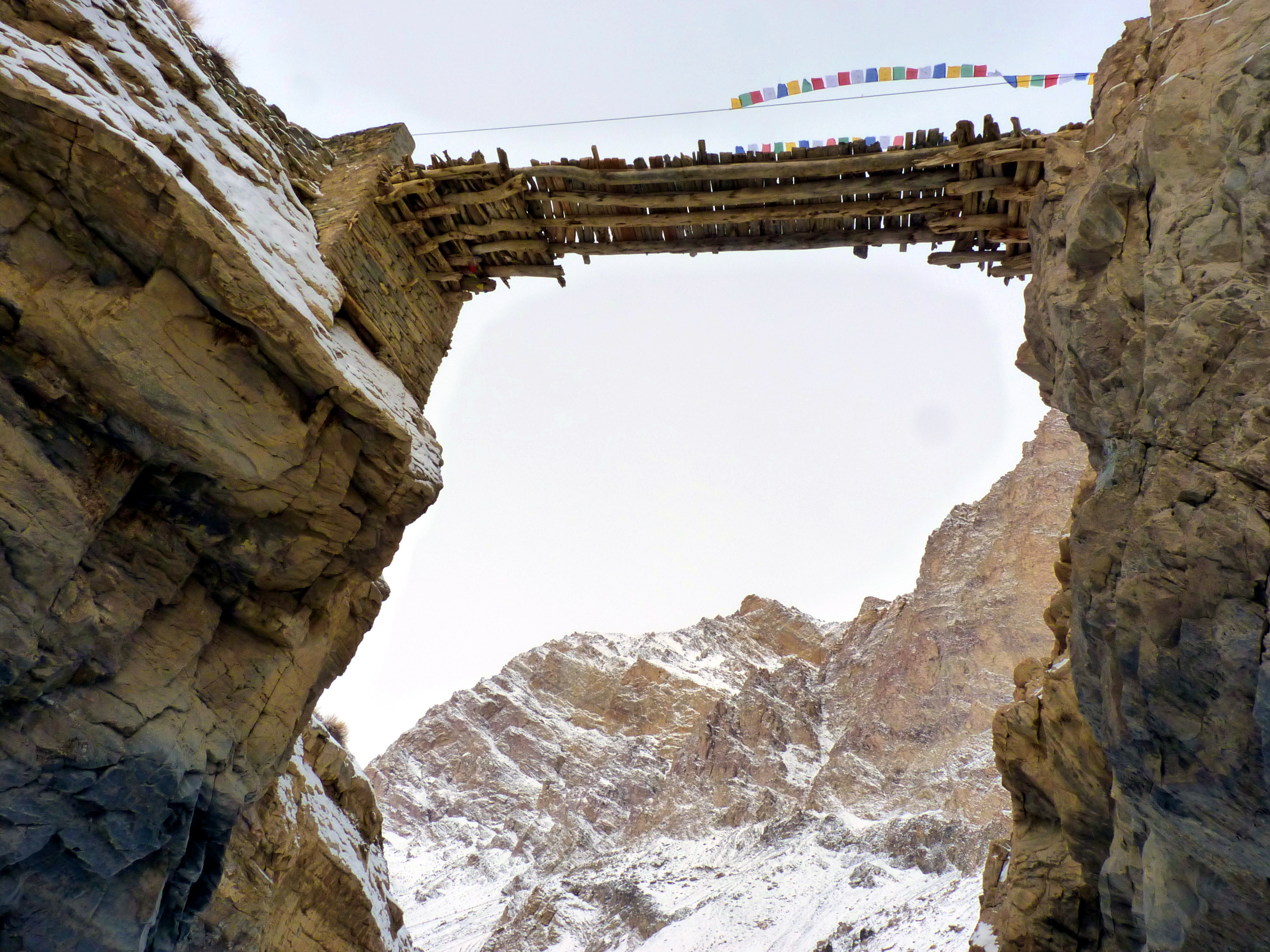
Wooden bridge at Nerak

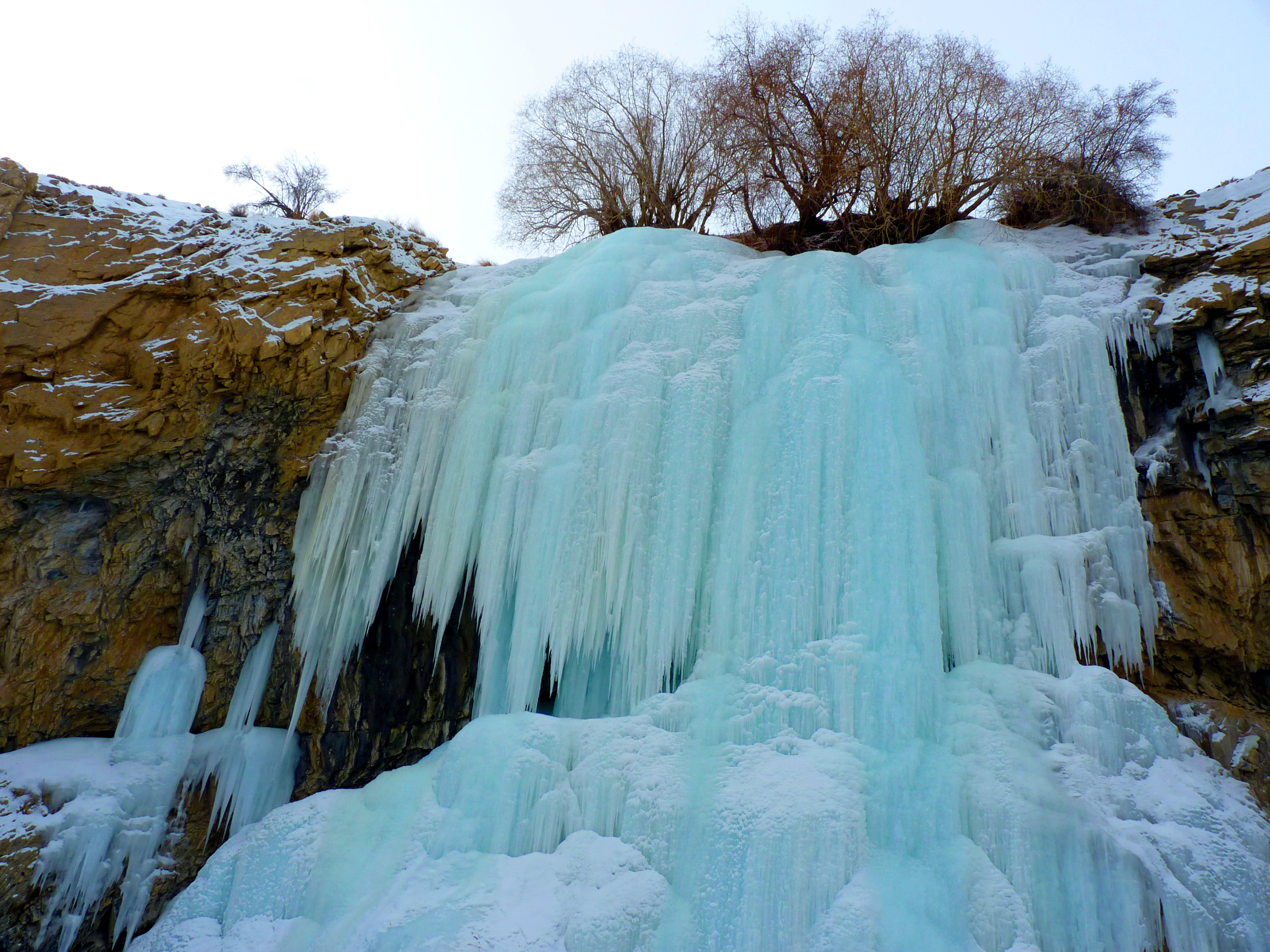
Nerak fall
