= All Ladakh Gonpa Association =

Indian organisation of Buddhist monasteries

All Ladakh Gonpa Association (ALGA) is the central organisation of the Buddhist monasteries in Ladakh, India. It aims to preserve and strengthen the monastic institutions. It was founded by the 19th Kushok Bakula Rinpoche in 1949 and he acted as its president for 41 years, from 1949 until 1991. In 1949, the first meeting of the great monasteries was held and ten monasteries took part. All Ladakh Gonpa Association was registered in 1959 and is run by a governing body consisting of fifteen lama members belonging to all four major schools of Tibetan Buddhism. There are sixteen major monastic institutions with hundreds of monks in each monastery.

== List of monasteries ==
These are listed by the river valleys. These monasteries are located on the banks and mountain slopes of various rivers within Indus River system.

- Shyok River valley:

- Nubra River valley:
  - Diskit Monastery, 115 km (71 mi) north of Leh.
  - Hundur Monastery, 121 km (75 mi) north of Leh, 6 km (3.7 mi) west of the Diskit Monastery and 19 km (12 mi) east of Thoise.
  - Samstanling Monastery the main monastery in the valley and for viewing tall statue of Maitreya Buddha, 30 km (19 mi) northeast of Diskit Monastery and 145 km (90 mi) northwest of Leh.
  - Ensa Monastery, 61 km (38 mi) north of Diskit and 171 km (106 mi) north of Leh.
  - Turtuk Monastery, 91 km (57 mi) west of Diskit and 201 km (125 mi) north of Leh.

- Indus River valley:
  - NH-1 "Kargil-Haknis-Leh Road", listed in order of from Kargil direction to Leh.
    - Mulbekh Monastery at 11,495 ft (3,504 m), on Kargil-Leh Road 40 km (25 mi) southeast of Kargil and 175 km (109 mi) west of Leh. It is the location of 30 ft (9.1 m) tall Maitreya Buddha statue - one of the three Maitreya Buddha statues of Ladakh, 1430 CE kharosti language edicts on the hill, two 800-year-old gompas, and the annual Festival of the two Rongtsan oracles around Buddhist new year usually in the first half of March.
    - Drigung Kagyud Zhadpa Dorjeeling Nunnery in Bhodkharbu, about 130 km (81 mi) from Leh and 80 km (50 mi) from Kargil.
    - Lamayuru Monastery, on Srinagar-Leh highway 15 kilometres (9.3 mi) east of the Fotu La and 19|km southwest of Khalsi.
      - Wanla Monastery, subsidiary of Lamayuru Monastery, located 13 km (8.1 mi) southwest of Lamayuru.
    - Rizong Monastery, built in 1831 CE, north of Srinagar-Leh highway and north of Mangyu temple complex.
    - Mangyu temple complex, 11th-13th century CE complex on Srinagar-Leh highway 22 kilometres (14 mi) southeast of Khalsi and 22 22 kilometres (14 mi) southwest of Alchi.
    - Alchi Monastery, 60 west of Leh on Leh-Kargil Highway.
    - Likir Monastery, 50 km (31 mi) west of Leh between Alchi and Basgo, 17 km (11 mi) west of Basgo and 21 km (13 mi) northeast of Alchi.
    - Basgo Monastery, 36 west of Leh and 5 m (16 ft) west of Nimoo on Leh-Kargil Highway.
    - Phyang Monastery, 16th century, at Fiang village 15 km (9.3 mi) west of Leh.
  - Leh city: listed in order of north to south.
    - Spituk Monastery, in Leh city, 8 m (26 ft) from city centre.
      - Sankar Monastery, in Leh city, subsidiary of Spituk Monastery.
    - Sumda Chun monastery at Leh, at height of 3500 mtr, is one of the most important surviving early Tibetan Buddhist temples of the Ladakh region, 6 km (3.7 mi) north of center of Leh.
    - Namgyal Tsemo Monastery, 16th century complex in Leh city near Tsemo Castle. It has a three-story high gold statue of Maitreya Buddha and ancient manuscripts and frescoes.
  - NH-3 "Leh-Upshi Road", listed in order of moving from Leh towards Upshi.
    - Shey Monastery, 10 km (6.2 mi) southeast of Leh.
    - Stok Monastery, 15 km (9.3 mi) south of Leh on slopes on southern bank of Indus.
    - Thikse Monastery, 16 km (9.9 mi) southeast of Leh, has 15 m (49 ft) high Budhha statue.
    - Nyerma Nunnery, 19 km (12 mi) southeast of Leh.
    - Stakna Monastery, 20 km (12 mi) southeast of Leh.
    - Matho Monastery, 26 m (85 ft) southeast of Leh.
    - Hemis Monastery, 40 km (25 mi) southeast of Leh and 18 km (11 mi) northwest of Upshi. Hemis festival is held on the 10th day of the fifth month (non or jyestha) of the Monkey year of Tibetan calendar i.e. vesak.
      - Chemrey Monastery, 6 km north of Hemis on Hemis-Durbuk Road, 46 km southeast of Leh and 24 km northwest of Upshi.
      - Takthok Monastery, at Sakti village 21 km north of Hemis on Hemis-Durbuk Road, 61 km southeast of Leh and 24 km northwest of Upshi.
    - Hanle Monastery, 19 km south of LAC, 255 km southeast of Leh, 208 km southeast of Upshi and 75 km southeast of Nyoma.

- Tso Moriri area in Changthang plateau
  - Korzok Monastery, it is 211 km (131 mi) southeast of Leh, 164 km (102 mi) southeast of Upshi, east of Meroo and 58 km (36 mi) south of Mahe. Korzok Gu-stor festival is held here.

- Markha River Valley, on "Nimoo-Chilling-Markha Road", these are also accessible from Leh on 56 km long Leh-Chilling road:
  - Lama Guru Monastery, 35 km southeast of Nimoo, 56 km southwest of Leh on Leh-Chilling-Markha road.
  - Skiu-Kaya, twin villages next to each other.
    - Kaya monastery, 11th century, built by Rinchen Zangpo, couple of km east of Chilling.
    - Skiu monastery, 11th century, built by Rinchen Zangpo, couple of km east of Kaya.
  - Hankar Monastery and Fort, 35–40 km east of Chilling, east of Markha.
  - Techa Monastery is one of the most important monastery in the Markha valley.

- Kharnak valley, on "Pang-Kharnak-Khurna valley Road".
  - Dhat Monastery, northwest of Pang.

- Zanskar River valley:
  - "Padum-Shankoo-Kargil Road", listed in order of moving from Padum towards Kargil.
    - Sani Monastery, 6 km (3.7 mi) northwest of Padum.
    - Dzongkhul Monastery, 30 km northwest of Padum.
    - Rangdum Monastery, 25 km (16 mi) north of Pensi La (pass to Zanskar valley) and near Zulidok at head of the Suru Valley, It is on Padum-Sankoo-Kargil Road, 103 km northwest of Padum, 87 km southeast of Sankoo and 196 southeast of Kargil.
  - Padum area.
    - Karsha Monastery, 11 km north of Padum.
  - "Padum-Zangla-Lingshed Road", listed in order of moving from Padum to Lingshed.
    - Stongdey Monastery, 18 km northeast of Padum.
    - Tsazar Monastery, 6 km south of Zangla and 26 km northeast of Padum.
    - Zangla Monastery, 262 km southeast of Kargil city, 32 km northeast of Padum,
    - Lingshed Monastery, 84 km northeast of Padum.
  - "Nimmu–Padum–Darcha road", listed in order of moving from Padum to south towards Darcha in Himachal.
    - Bardan Monastery, 17th century, 12 km south of Padum. Zongkhul Huchot festival is held on the 16th and 17th days of the fourth Tibetan month, i.e. the Buddha's birth on Vesak.
    - Phugtal Monastery, 52 km southeast of Padum on Nimmu–Padum–Darcha road (NPDR). Several festivals are held here throughout the year.

== List of edicts ==
These are listed by the river valleys. These edicts are located in or near monasteries on the banks and mountain slopes of various rivers within Indus river system.

- Shyok River valley:
- Nubra River valley:
- Indus River valley:
  - Kargil-Haknis-Leh Road, listed in order of from Kargil direction to Leh.
    - Mulbekh (also spelled "Mulbe") edict of King Bum Ide, 1430 CE, near Mulbekh Monastery and rock cut Buddha statue.
  - Leh city: listed in order of north to south.
  - Leh-Upshi Road, listed in order of moving from Leh towards Upshi.
- Tso Moriri area in Changthang plateau
- Zanskar River valley:
  - Padum-Shankoo-Kargil Road, listed in order of moving from Padum towards Kargil.
  - Padum-Zangla-Lingshed Road, listed in order of moving from Padum to Lingshed.

== See also ==
- List of Tibetan monasteries
  - Himalayan monasteries
- Tourism in Ladakh
- Geography of Ladakh
