= Dzongkhul Monastery =

Tibetan Buddhist monastery in Zanskar, Ladakh, India

Coordinates: 33°33′00″N 76°39′36″E

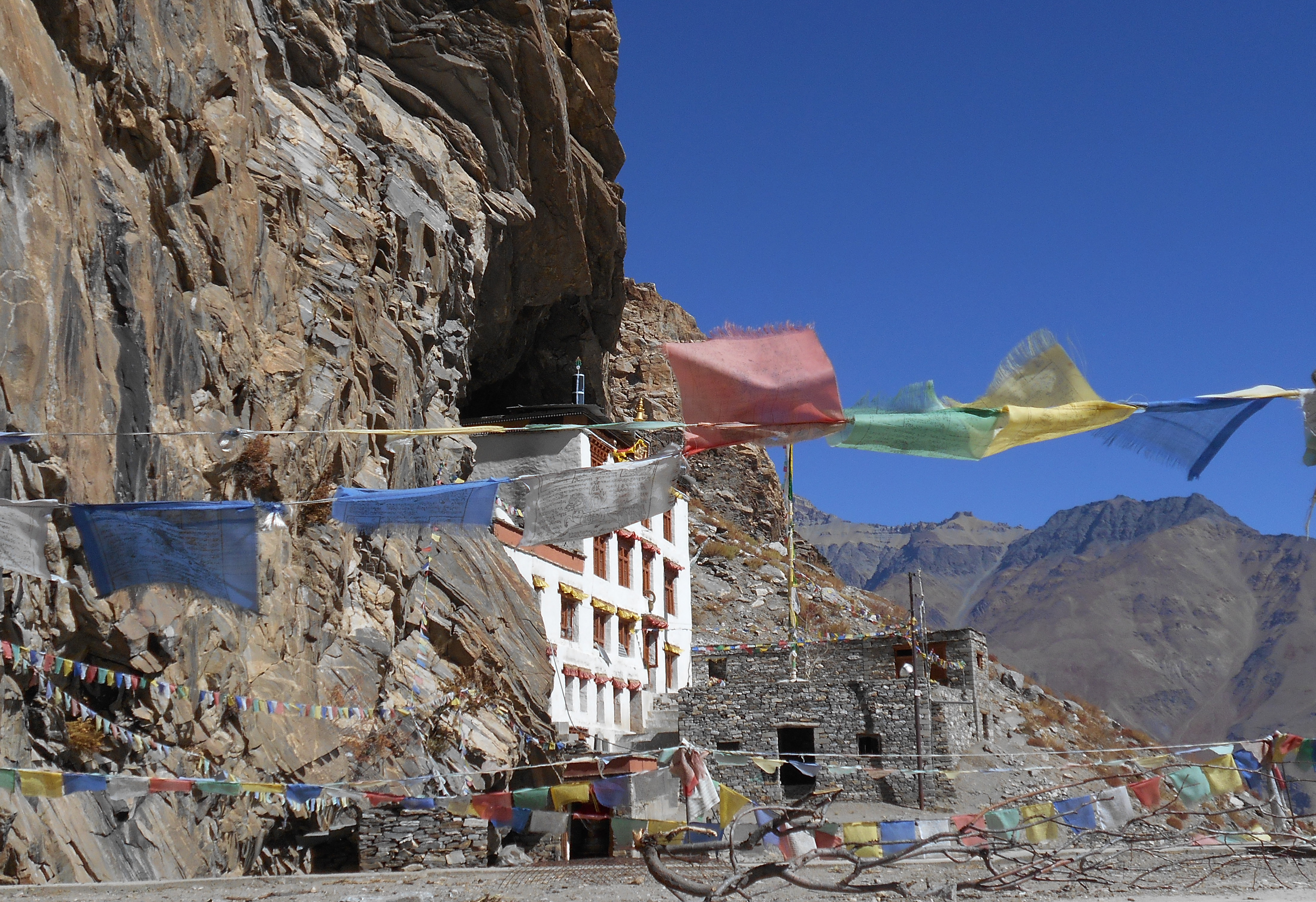

Religion
- Affiliation: Tibetan Buddhism
- Sect: Kagyu
- Deity: Naropa

Location
- Location: Stod Valley, Zanskar, Ladakh, India
- Interactive map of Dzongkhul Monastery

Architecture
- Founder: Naropa
- Established: 10th or 11th century

Dzongkhul Monastery or Zongkhul Gompa is located 30 km northwest of Padum in the Stod Valley of Zanskar in Ladakh, northern India. Like the Sani Monastery, it belongs to the Drukpa school of Tibetan Buddhism

Dzongkhul has traditionally been home to famous yogins. It is sited near the foot of a wide valley which leads to the pass known as the Umasi-la which joins Zanskar and Kishtwar.

== History ==
Its foundation is attributed to Naropa (956-1041 CE), who was a celebrated Indian Buddhist yogi, mystic and monk from the renowned Vikramshila University in Bihar. He is said to have meditated in one of the two caves around which the gompa is built and the monastery is dedicated to him. His footprint can be seen in the rock near the entrance to the lower cave. The gompa contains images and thankas of famous Drukpa lamas. Zhadpa Dorje, a famous painter and scholar created some of the frescoes on the cave walls almost 300 years ago.

Impressions of Naropa's ceremonial dagger and staff are also said to be in the rocks in his meditation cave which attracts many pilgrims. Until about the 1960s, there were some 20 resident monks, but the numbers have subsequently dropped.

It also contains a collection of religious artifacts, such as an ivory image of Samvara, a crystal stupa, and texts containing spiritual songs and biographies.

Dzongkhul became a flourishing Kagyu meditation centre under the Zanskari yogi Ngawang Tsering (1717–1794).

== Description ==
Dzongkhul is in a south-western side valley of the Bardur River. It is built directly on a rock wall with two caves behind. In front are about 10 stone houses which tend to blend in with the surrounding rocks from a distance. About 10 minutes' walk from the gompa is a high viewing spot similar to the one at Hemis Monastery with views from the terrace.

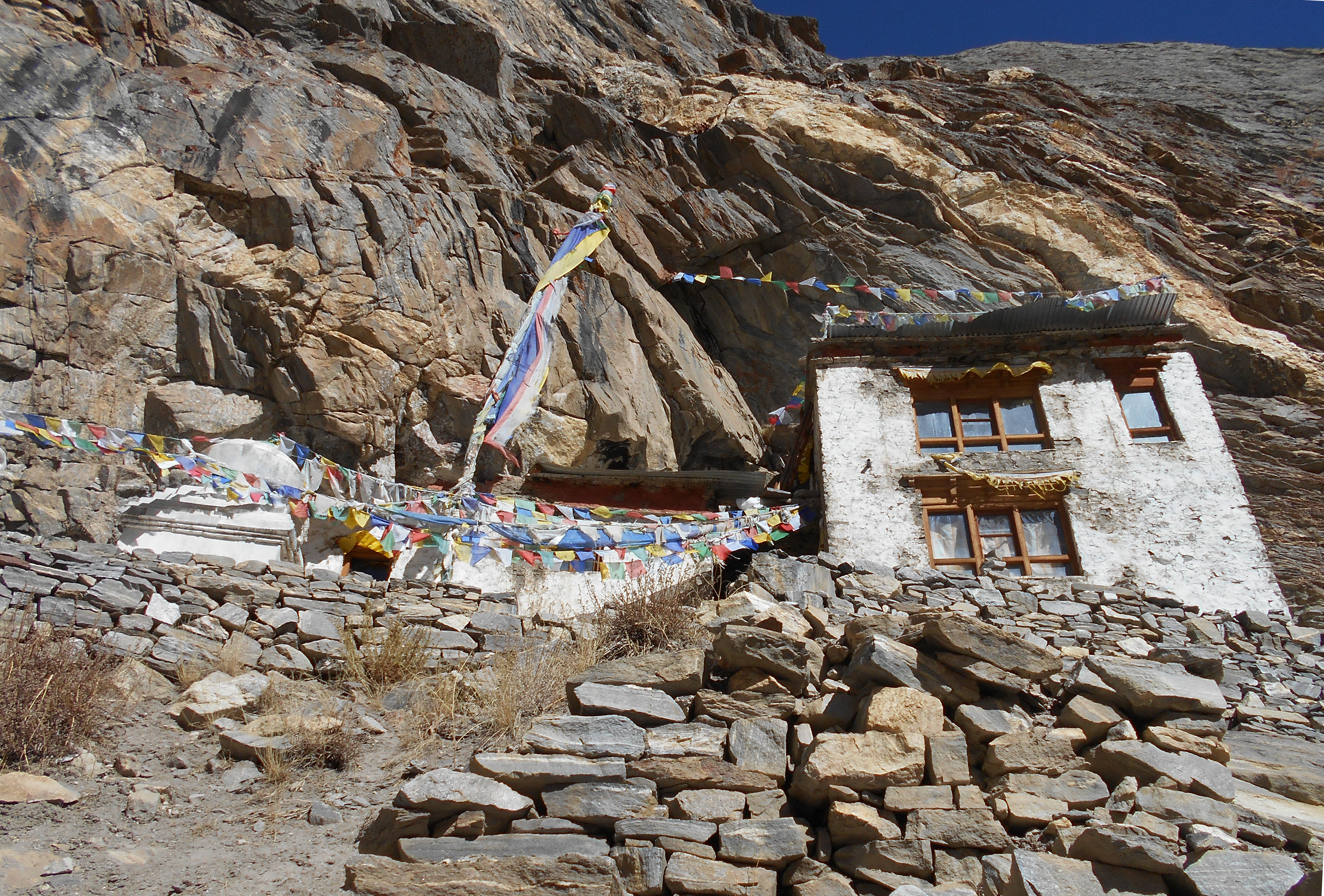
Zongkhul Cave Gompa

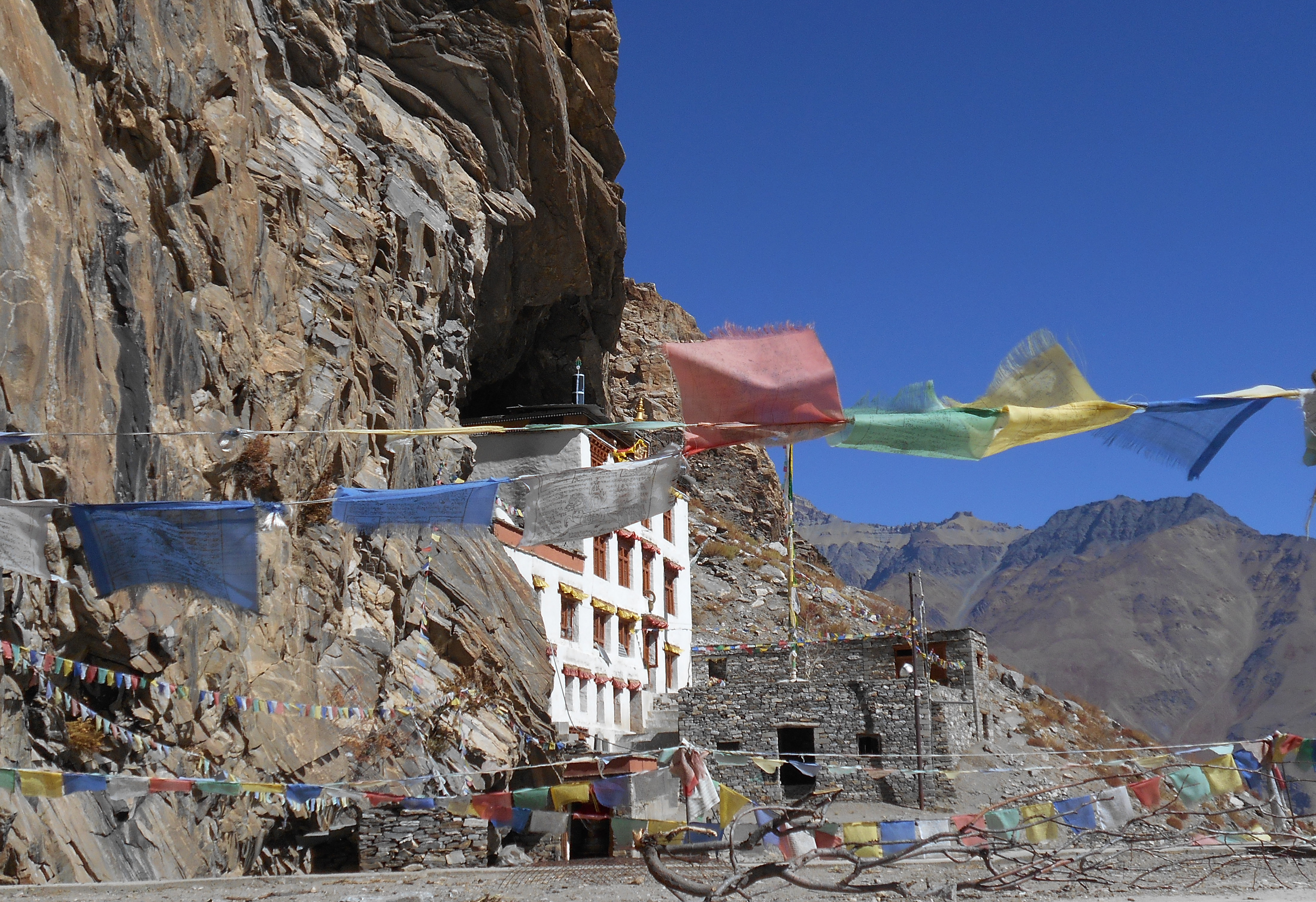
Zongkhul Monastery

== Festivals ==
The Zongkhul Huchot festival on the 16th and 17th days of the fourth Tibetan month, i.e. sbrul (Snake) or saga (vaisakha) the Buddha's birth on Vesak, but there are no masked dances.

== See also ==
- List of buddhist monasteries in Ladakh
- Tourism in Ladakh
