= Sani Monastery =

Tibetan Buddhist monastery in Zanskar, Ladakh, India

Coordinates: 33°30′19″N 76°48′37″E

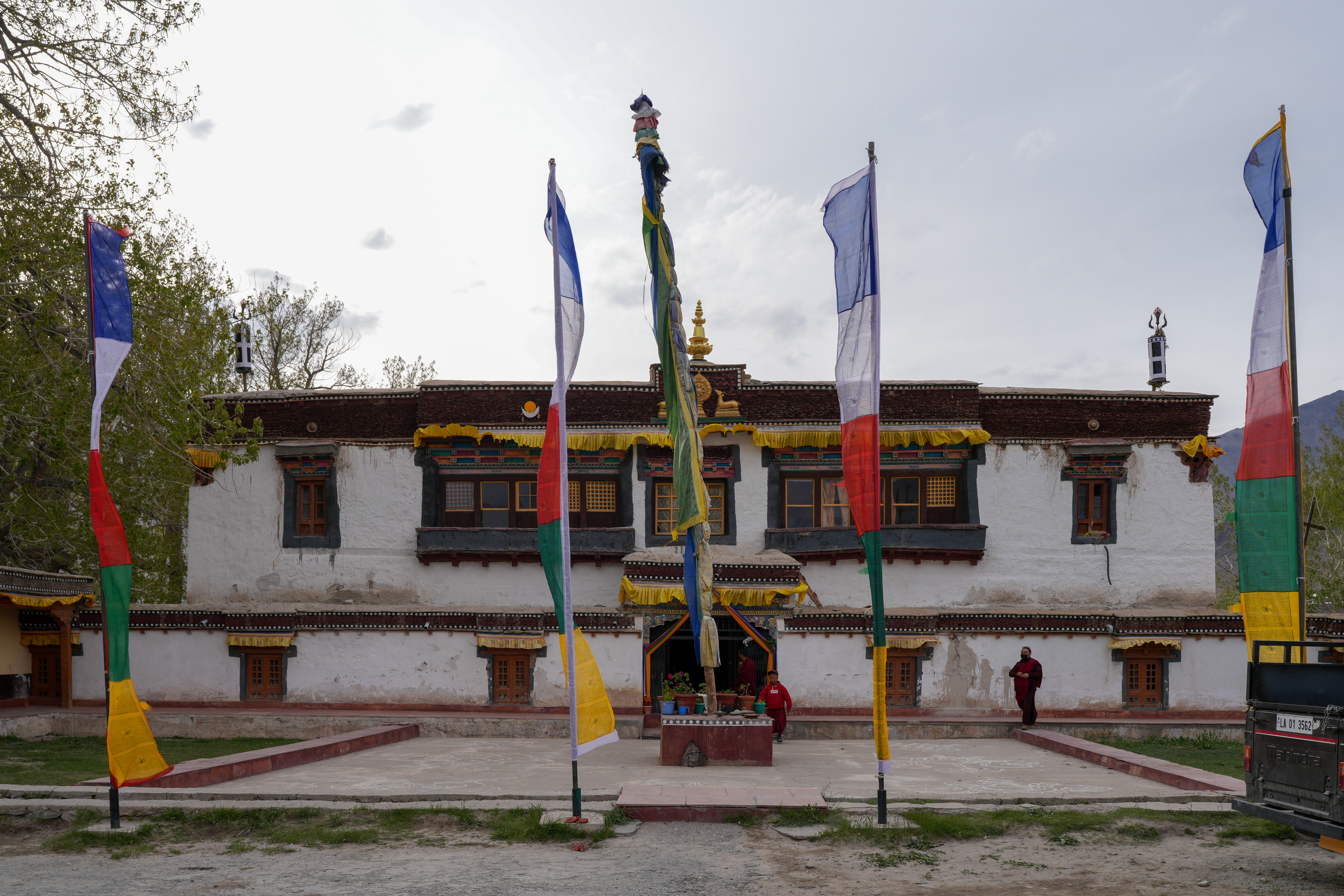
- Front facade of the main building

Religion
- Affiliation: Tibetan Buddhism
- Sect: Kagyu
- Deity: Padmasambhava
- Festivals: Nungnes; Sani Nasjal

Location
- Location: Zanskar, Ladakh, India
- Interactive map of Sani Monastery

Architecture
- Founder: Kanishka?
- Established: 2nd century CE?

Sani Monastery (also written Sanee), Sa-ni-[tshog], is located next to the village of Sani where the Stod Valley broadens into the central plain of Zanskar in Ladakh, northern India. It is about 6 km to the northwest of the regional centre of Padum. Like Dzongkhul Monastery, it belongs to the Drukpa Kargyu school of Tibetan Buddhism, and is the only one of this order in Zanskar which has nuns. It is thought to be the oldest religious site in Ladakh and Zanskar.

== History ==
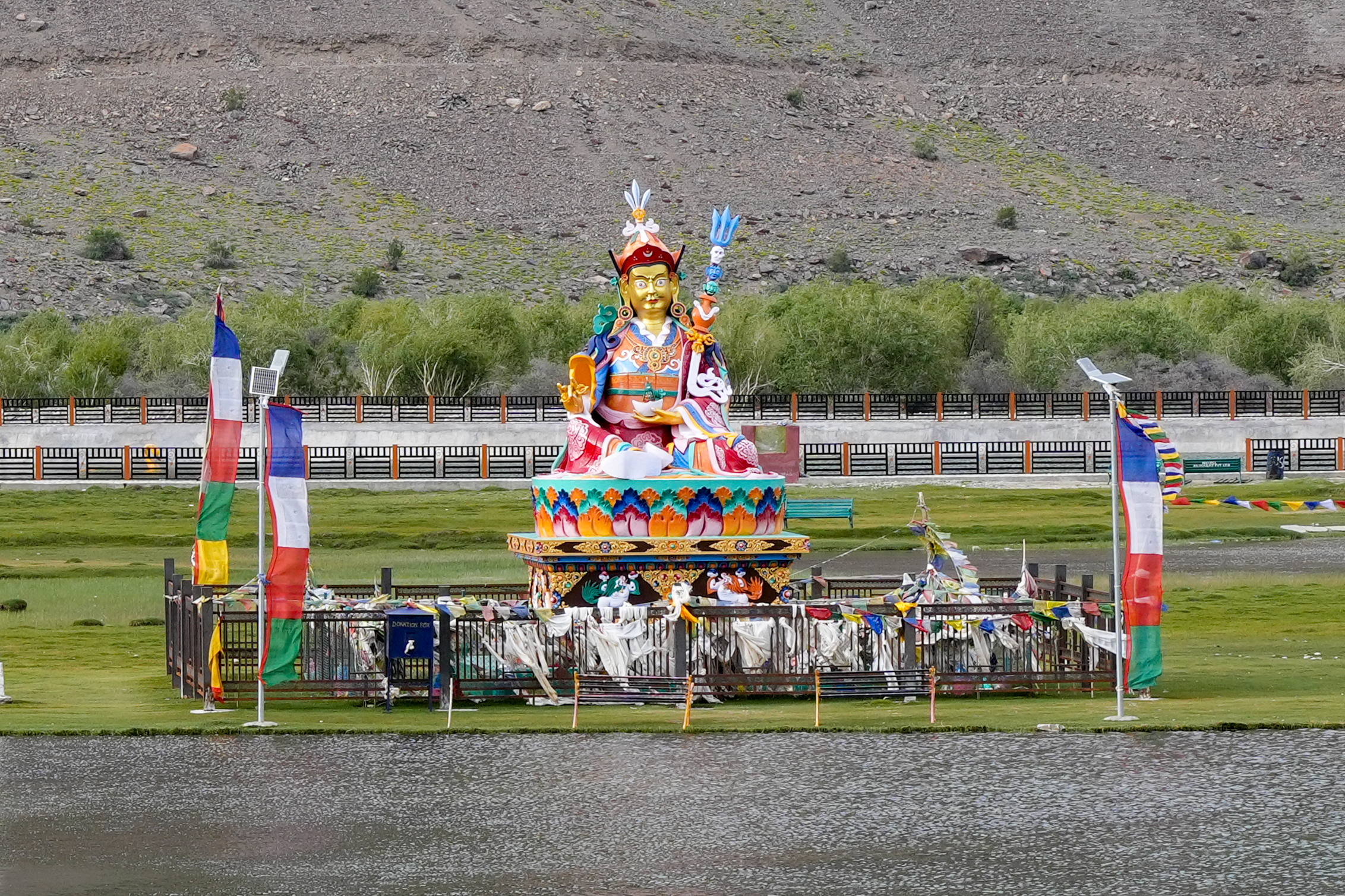
Padmasambhava statue in nearby Sani lake

The gompa is built to accommodate an ancient chorten 6 m (20 ft) high and of unusual shape, known as the Kanika Chorten, is presumed to date back to the time of the Kushan emperor, Kanishka. Kanishka's era is now thought to have begun in 127 CE. 'Kanika' is a commonly used form of Emperor Kanishka's name. He is notable in Buddhist literature as a promoter of Buddhism and he is said to have sponsored an important Buddhist conference in nearby Kashmir. This seems to be the only monastery in the region other than Gandhola Monastery in Lahaul which has a history which purportedly goes back to Kushan times.

The 17th century Chronicle of Zaṅs-dkar (Zanskar) says that the (semi?) mythical,

". . . high King Ge-sar Gesar of Gliṅ came to this blessed Zaṅs-dkar, where the religion of heaven and earth arose, and he broke the whole earth with his feet. 'U-rgyan-pa-dma Padmasambhava came, and exorcised the demons; he kept down the bad Sa-bkra [= Sa-dgra, 'enemy of the earth'?]. The female ogre was as if she had fallen on her back. The Sa-ni and Ka-ni-ka monasteries were erected at the head of the region, the Gña-nam-gu-ru monastery of Pi-pi-tiṅ on the heart, and the Gña-nam-gu-ru [monastery] of Byams-gliṅ on the feet."

It is of interest to note that, although they are dated here to the time of Padmasambhava (late 8th to early 9th centuries), the Sani and Kanika monasteries are the first ones mentioned.

Padmasambhava, or Guru Rinpoche, is said to have dwelt for five years in the small 'Gamshot Lhakang' squeezed between the main building and the corridor, to the right of the Kanika chorten. Inside may be seen a figure of Guru Rinpoche and historical scenes in half relief on both sides of the statue. Apparently, one can just see the white opening to a cave in a cliff across the river from the monastery where Padmasambhava is also said to have meditated for several years and it is still used as a meditation cell.

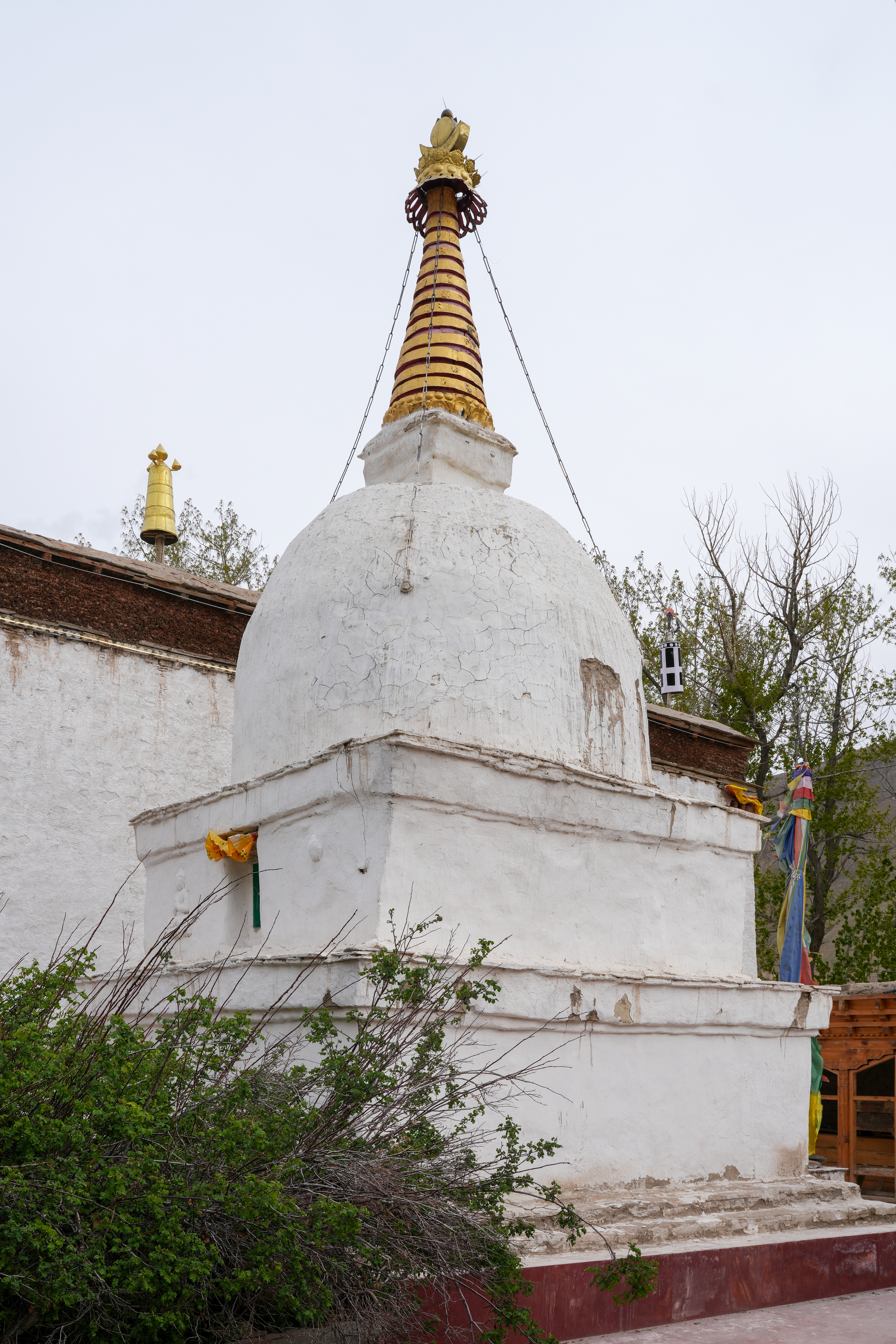
Kanika chorten ca. 2nd century AD

The monastery is also claimed to be connected with the Indian Yogi Naropa (956-1041 CE). There is now small room next to the Kanika chorten where it is thought that Naropa meditated in which there is a veiled bronze statue of the yogi.

A group of Kargyu nuns established a small retreat centre at "Starkhugnza" in the 1990s. It is a site above Sani which was founded by Ngawang Tsering (1657-1732), a Zanskar meditator. All of the nunneries in Zanskar are under the spiritual authority of the monks and few have much in the way of endowments.

== Description ==
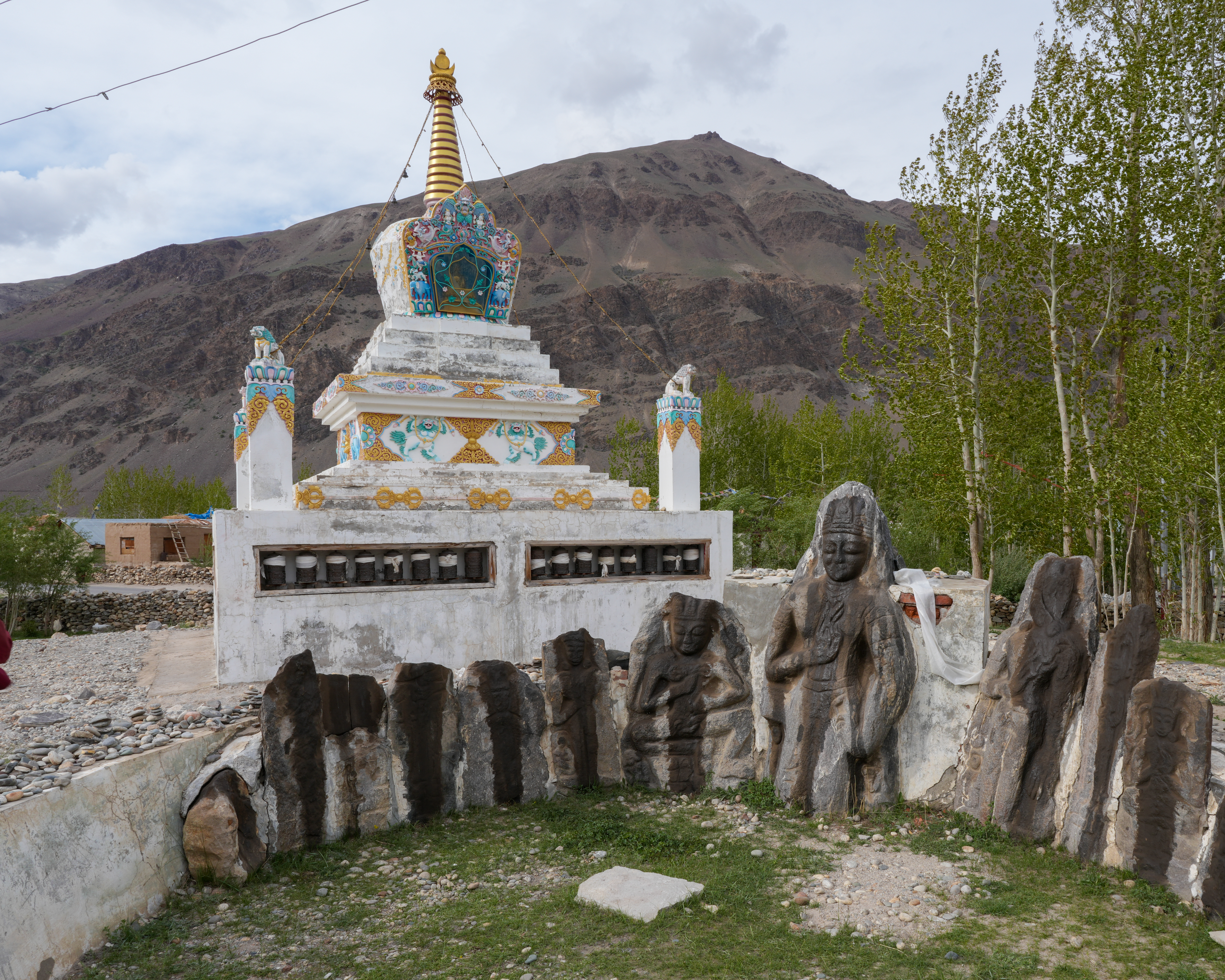
Holy crematory grounds of Sani monastery

Unusually, the gompa is not built on a hill or mountain but on flat land. It is in the form of a castle and the Kanika chorten is in the backyard of the enclosing stone walls with chortens mounted at intervals. Next to the Kanika chorten are ten standing stones with engravings of deities in a pre-Tibetan style.

One enters the rectangular compound of the gompa through a gate chorten with prayer wheels. As well as the usual depictions of protective deities there is a goat's head filled jewels and prayer cards with "Om mani padme hum" written on them.

The Assembly Hall or Dukhang has 16 columns and houses images of Chamba, Chenren and Padmasambhava as well as others. Behind the altar is the Gongkhang, a small room containing an ancient figure of Cho Rinpoche and a bookshelf holding the sacred volumes of the Kangyur.

The smaller temple dedicated to Naropa is decorated with bas-reliefs in stucco painted in bright colours and with niches for the images. There is also "a magnificent plantation of huge old poplars" adjoining the gompa, notable in the mostly treeless Zanskar region.

One of the eight most important cremation grounds of Tibetan Buddhists is outside the monastery complex and the cemetery is ringed with ancient rock-carvings which show Indian influences. In the cremation ground is a two-metre-high boulder with a painting of Maitrya on it which shines from the sacrificial oil poured over it by pilgrims. There is also a nearby mast with prayer flags on it.

== Festivals ==
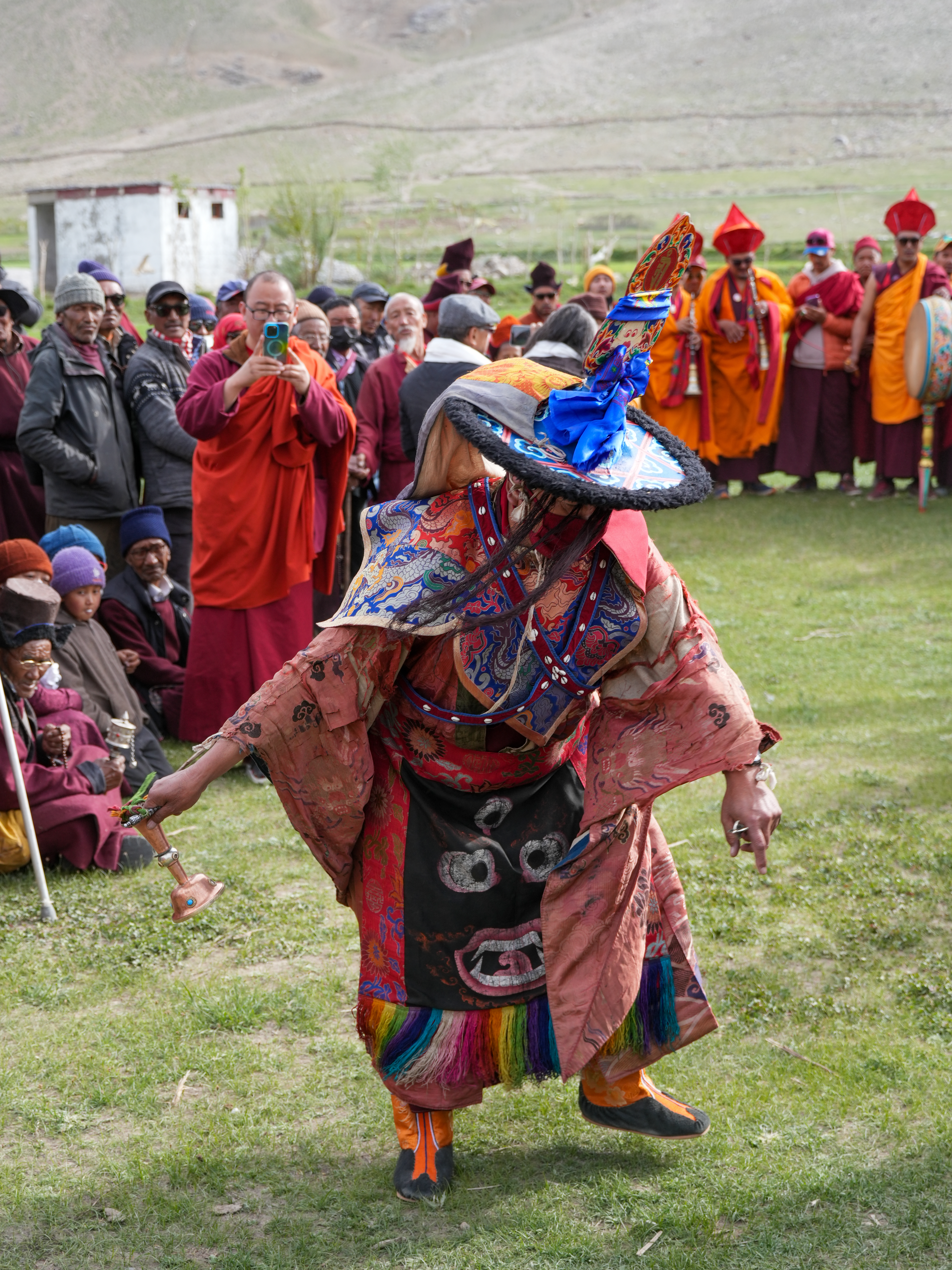
Bardan lama in masked dance at Sani, June 2024

Nungnes has no fixed date but usually takes place in July. Sani Naro-Nasjal is usually in the first week of August, between the 15th and the 20th of the sixth Tibetan month. It takes place during the blooming of the 'Guru Neropa Flower'. Every year the statue of Naropa is unveiled in late July or early August on the eve of the Naro-Nasjal Festival. Lamas from Bardan Monastery perform masked dances as ritual offering.

There is an annual ritual reading of the Tibetan canon, the 'Great Prayer Festival', held at the monastery during winter with the firewood provided by villagers in the region

From time to time the monks boil up goats' heads in a long ceremony in which symbols of fortune and other garnishings are added according to the wealth of the person sponsoring this activity. These goats' heads hang outside the houses of almost every house in Leh and are thought to bring good fortune. Normally, these symbols are changed annually.

== See also ==
- List of buddhist monasteries in Ladakh
- Geography of Ladakh
- Tourism in Ladakh
- World Monuments Fund
