= Korzok Monastery =

Tibetan Buddhist monastery in Ladakh, India

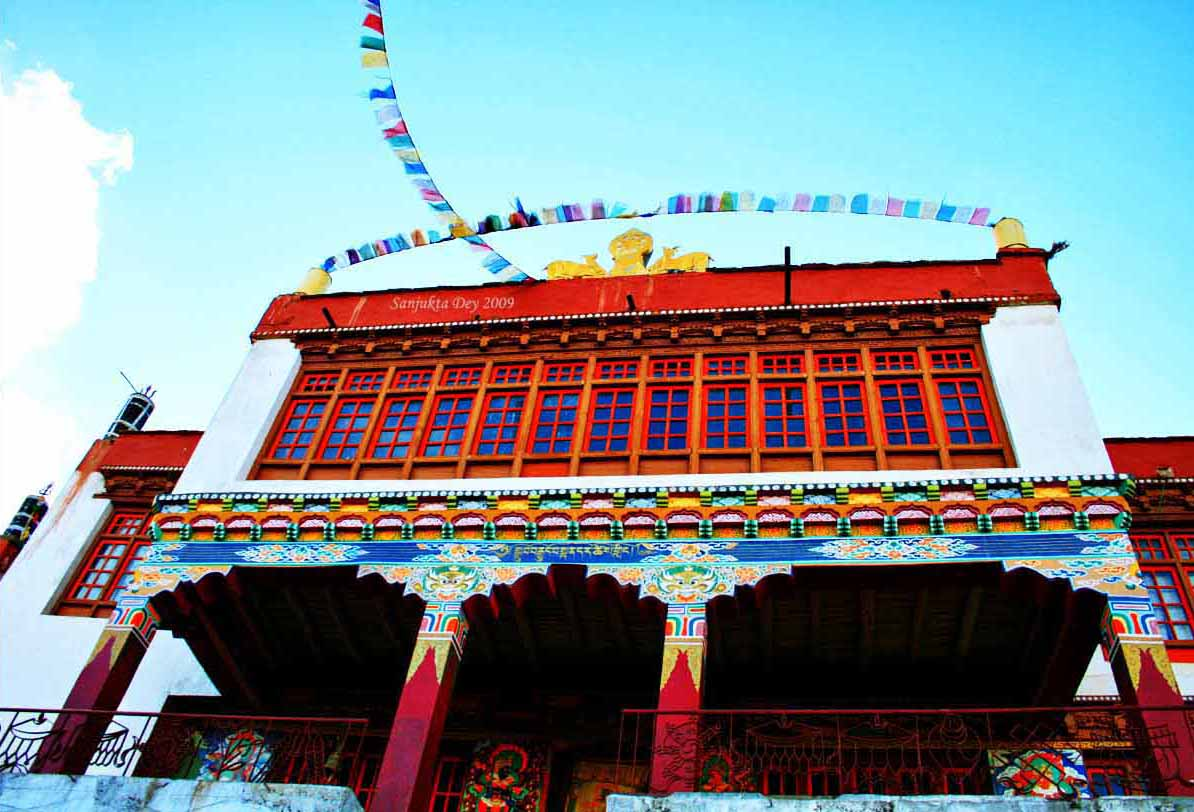
- Korzok Gompa

- Location within India Korzok Monastery (India)

Religion
- Affiliation: Tibetan Buddhism
- Festival: Korzok Gu-stor

Location
- Location: Korzok, on the western bank of the lake, Tso Moriri in Leh District, Ladakh
- Interactive map of Korzok Monastery
- Coordinates: 32.965758°N 78.253374°E

Architecture
- Style: Tibetan Architecture
- Founder: Kunga Lodro Ningpo

Korzok, དཀོར་མཛོད་ (wylie dkor-mdzod) is a Tibetan Buddhist monastery belonging to the Drukpa Lineage. It is located in the Korzok village, on the northwestern bank of Tso Moriri, a lake in Leh District of Ladakh, a union territory of India. The gompa (monastery), at 4,560 metres (14,960 ft), houses a Shakyamuni Buddha and other statues. It is home to about seventy monks.

In the past, the monastery was the headquarters of the Rupshu Valley. It is an independent monastery under Korzok Rinpoche, widely known as Langna Rinpoche. The third Korzok Rinpoche, Kunga Lodro Ningpo was the founder of Korzok Monastery.

The monastery is 300 years old. The Tso Moriri below it is also held in reverence and considered equally sacred by the local people. With the efforts of the WWF-India, Tso Moriri has been pledged as a 'Sacred Gift for a Living Planet' by the local community (mostly Chang pa herdsmen). As a result, the area has been opened up for tourists.

== Etymology ==
The name Korzok is a derivation from two words, namely kor meaning a 'place' in the Ladakhi language and zok which is said to derive from dzot-pa, meaning 'manager'. Over time, the sound of the final consonant of the dzot element has changed to the velar consonant [k] instead of the original alveolar [t].

An alternative attribution is that shepherds working for the monasteries in the nearby hamlets kept the king's cattle at this place, not only to tend them but to also extract milk, cheese and butter. Hence, the place came to be known as "Korzok". It is said that the nomads were exploited by the monastery as they were paid very meagre amounts for the services rendered. Hence the place was given the name 'Korzok' (meaning: acquired by unfair means).

== History ==
The history of Korzok is traced back to kings who ruled in the inhospitable terrain and fought several wars. They suffered several setbacks in wars and had to lead a nomadic life in isolation. One of the kings of this nomadic lineage had sent his emissary to Tibet seeking help. He brought a Lama from Tibet who established the monastery at Korzok about 300 years ago. Since then the nomads preferred to change their animistic religion and adopt to Buddhism. They preferred living peacefully and in harmony with their surroundings and animals. The reign of the nomadic kingdom ended with their last King Tsewang Yurgyal, who ruled until August 1947 when India became a democratic country.

Statues inside Korzok Monastery
Shakyamuni Buddha and other statues	Chortens and a Buddha statue

Korzok was in the Central Asian trade route till 1947 and was the headquarters of Rupshu Valley. One of the kings, Rupshu Goba, who lived there with his family, built nine permanent houses there.

The village has several houses, but the floating population of the nomads, establishing their tents (made of yak hair or skin) in summer, adds to the agricultural operations in the region. The tents are provided with vents at the top to let out smoke. Pashmina (yak's wool) is the valuable product that the Changmas trade along with the salt that they extract from large salt fields in the area, such as the springs at Puga. They barter these two products for food grains and other necessities. In Korzok, in recent years, building activity is on the rise with the nomadic tribes changing their life style.

== Structures ==
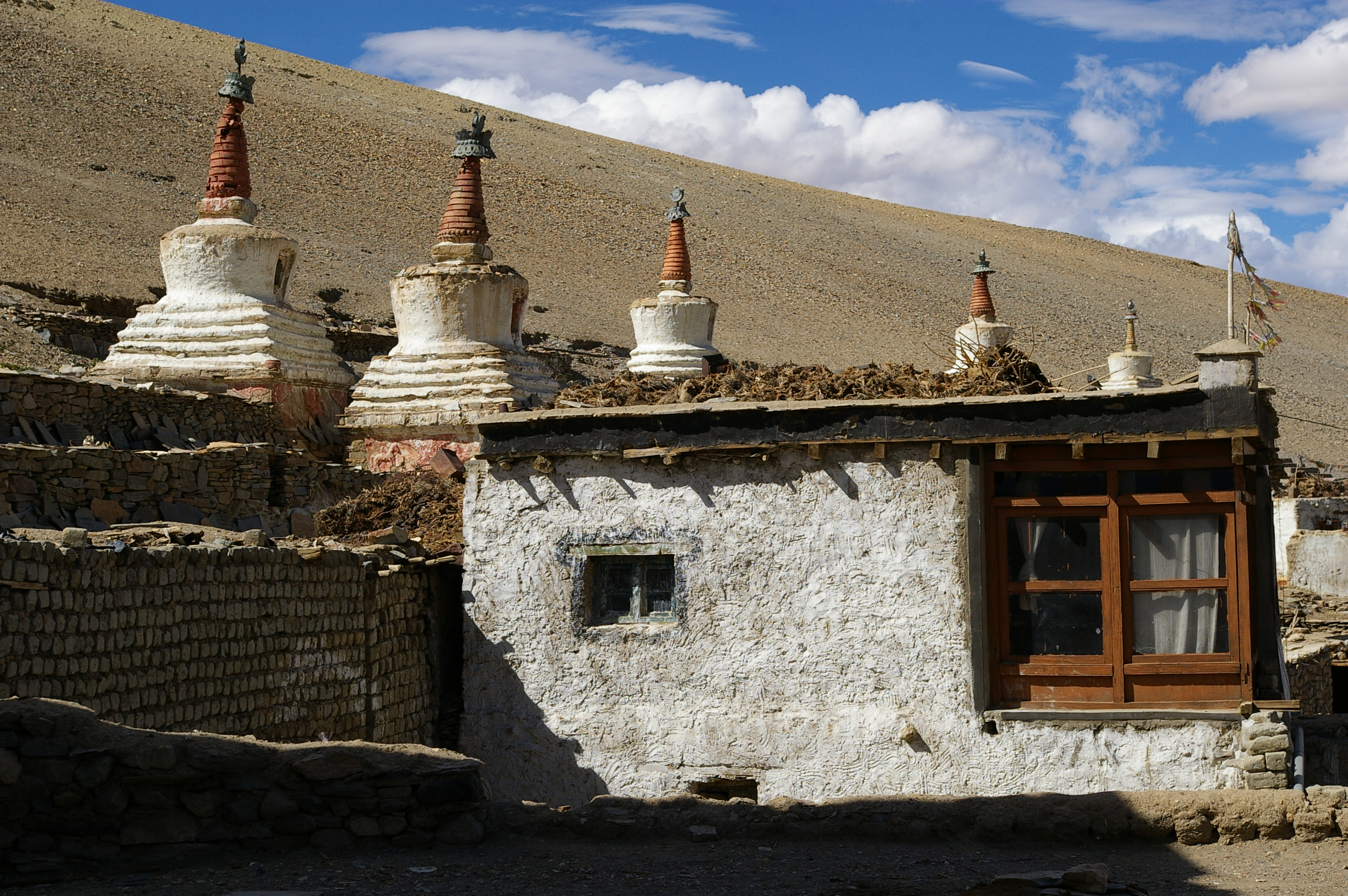
A number of chortens in Korzok village

Korzok monastery as seen now is said to have been re-built in the 19th century on the right bank of the Tsomoriri River. The old monastery was built on a gentle slope, unlike other monasteries that are generally perched on hill tops. An impressive photong is also located near to the Gompa. A number of chortens are also seen near the monastery. Korzok settlement is considered one of the oldest settlements of the world at this elevation.

The monastery houses the statue of Shakyamuni Buddha along with images of other deities. The monastery has beautiful ancient paintings (thangkas) which have been restored.

== Geography ==
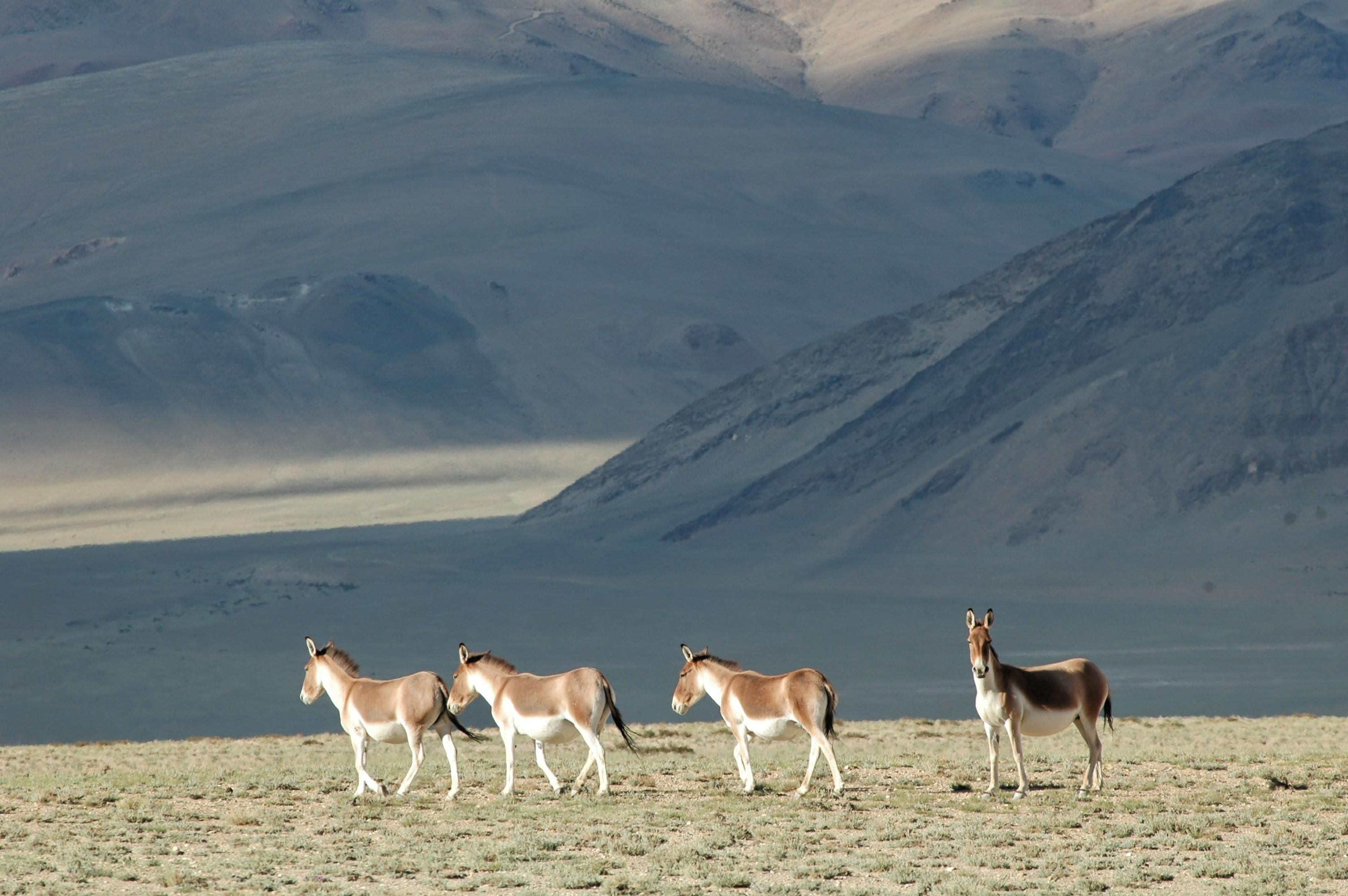
Tso Moriri (lake) and wildlife

Located 211 km (131 mi) southeast of Leh, 164 km (102 mi) southeast of Upshi, east of Meroo and 58 km (36 mi) south of Mahe, Korzok Monastery is on the northwestern bank of Ladakh's Tso Moriri (lake), one of the highest lakes in the world of its size. The lake covers an area of 120 square kilometres (46 mi^{2}). The water of the lake is partly brackish and partly sweet, with a depth of 30 metres (98 ft). The valley formed by the Tso Moriri and other lakes, is part of the Rupshu Valley and Plateau. The lake and its surrounding area is a Ramsar designated wetland.

Korzok is on the Ladakhi portion of the Changthang plateau amidst snow peaks that are the source of water to the lake. The Rupshu -Changthang area is a unique landscape. The barley fields in the Korzok village vicinity tended by the nomadic Changpa herdsmen (apart from the monks staying in the monastery) have been claimed to be the highest cultivated land in the world. The nomadic herdsmen seen here living in tents only, rear herds of goats, cows and yaks. Among the wildlife seen in the area are Himalayan birds, kiang (Tibetan wild ass), foxes and marmots. The streams, which rise in the valley, are used for irrigation. Summer temperatures in the area reach a high of 36 °C (97 °F) and a low of 5 °C (41 °F).

== Local festival ==
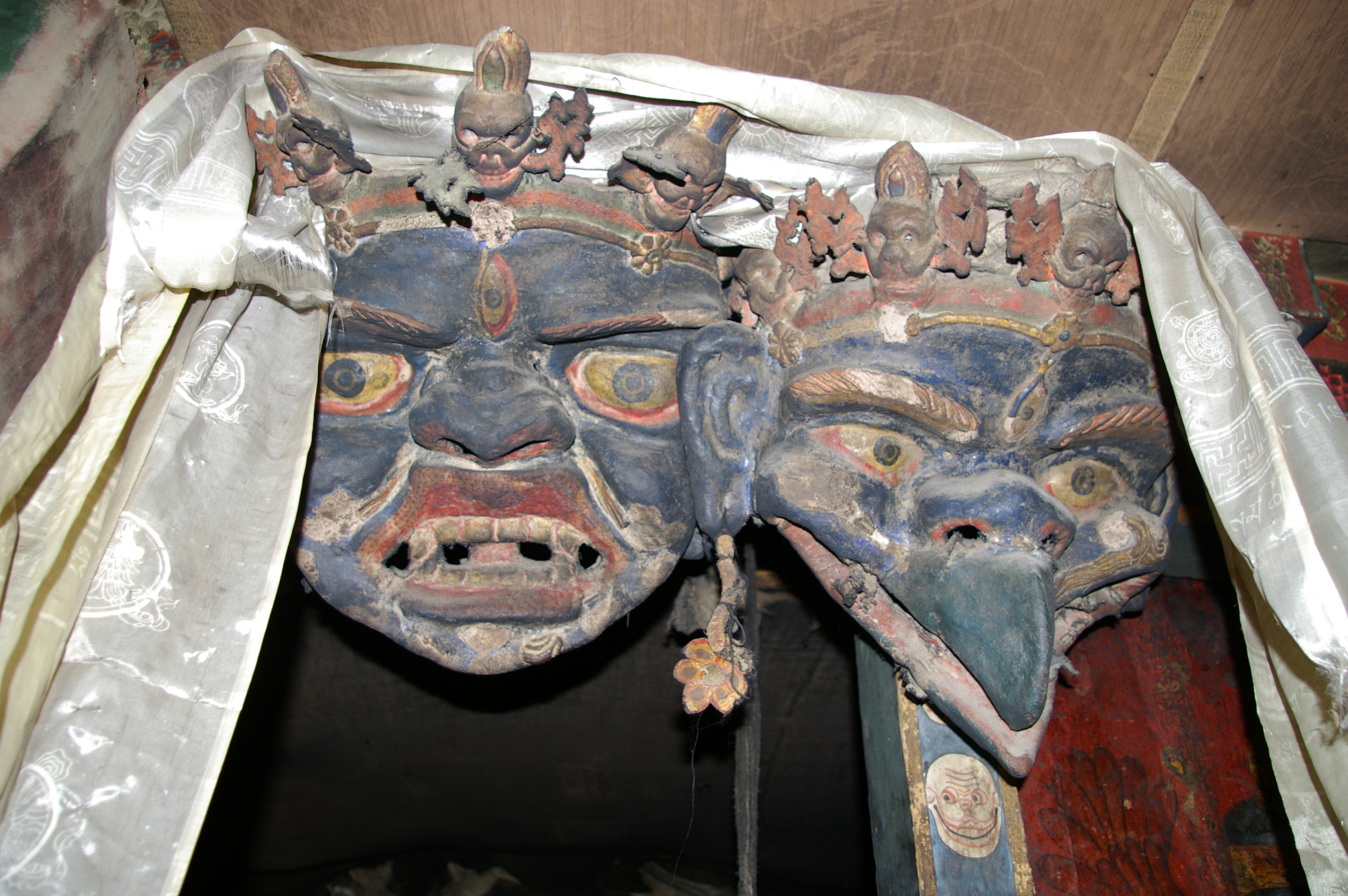
Masks used during the dance festival

The Korzok Gu-stor festival is held at the monastery and attracts many Chang-pa, the Tibetan Plateau nomadic herdsmen. At the festival masks are worn by the dancers to represent the Dharmapalas (guardian divinities of the Buddhist pantheon), and the patron divinities of the Drukpa sect of Tibetan Buddhism. The annual monastic festival is also held not only at Korzok but also at the Thuje in the Chungthan valley where the nomadic tribes fervently participate in the rituals. They not only make donations to the monasteries but also dedicate one son from each family to the monastery. It is said that the local nomads are so dedicated to Buddhism that opposite to their tents they allocate space to keep symbolic statue images of the Rinpoche, usually the Dalai Lama, along with the seven offering cups, in perfect harmony with their own folk (nomadic) religious deities and spirits.

== Tourism ==
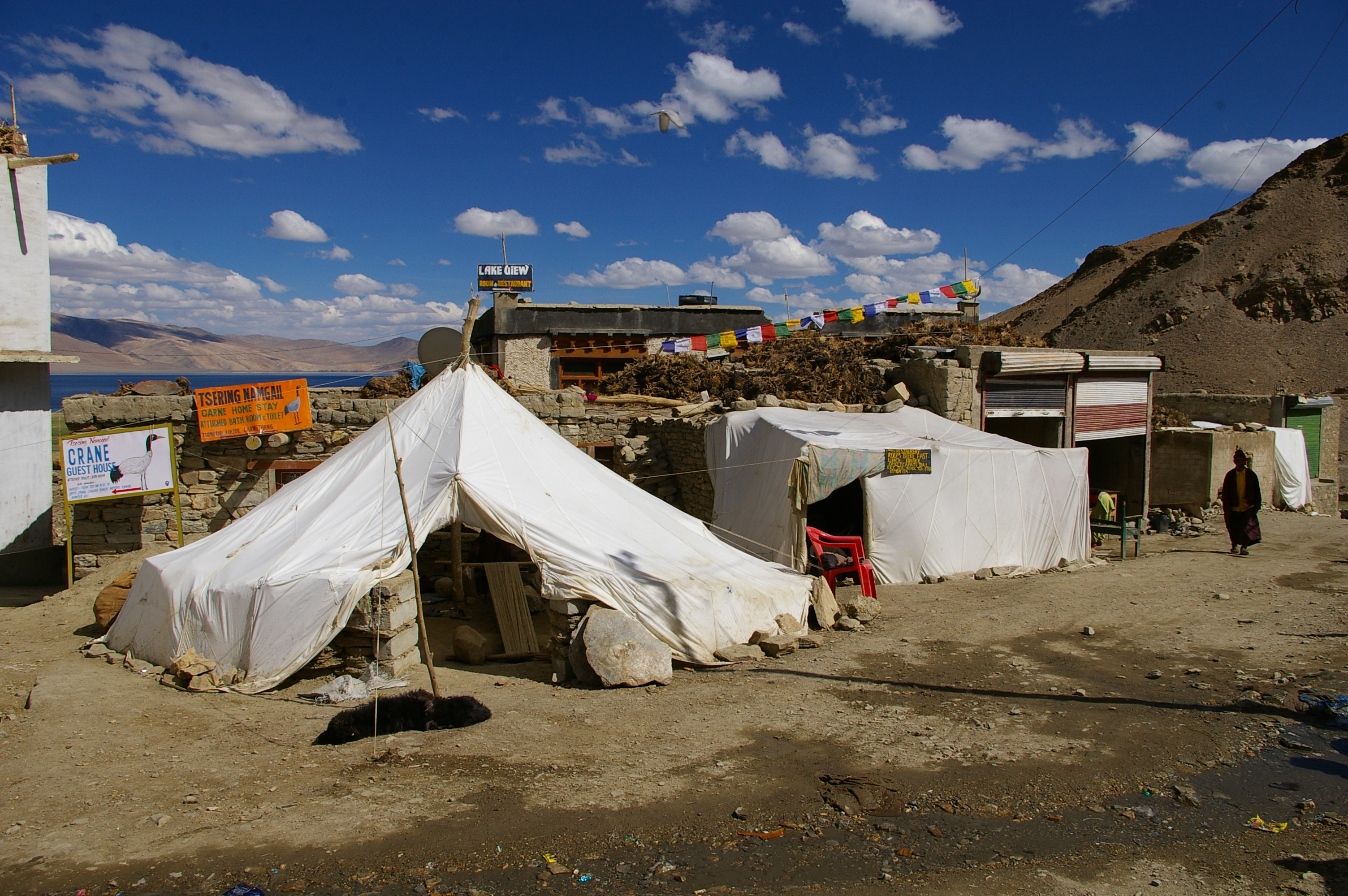
Tented accommodation near the Tsomoriri Lake

The monastery is located to the southeast of Leh, at a road distance of 215 kilometres (134 mi). It is also approachable from Manali. Leh is also connected by air with many destinations in India.

A permit—obtainable only at Leh—is essential for entry into the area. Only tented accommodation, pitched on the banks of the Tso Moriri, is available for visitors.

== Gallery ==
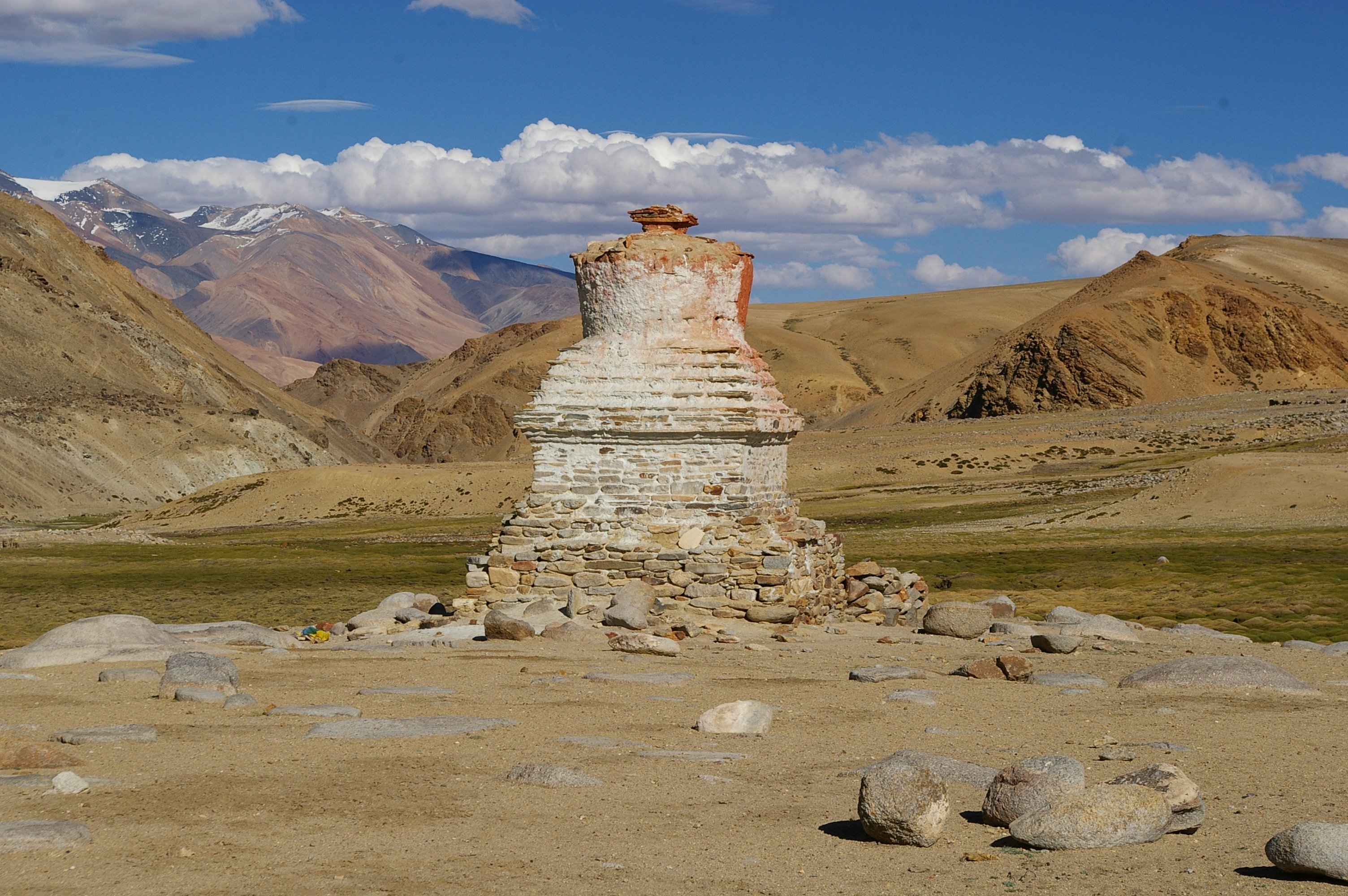
A chorten in Kurzok

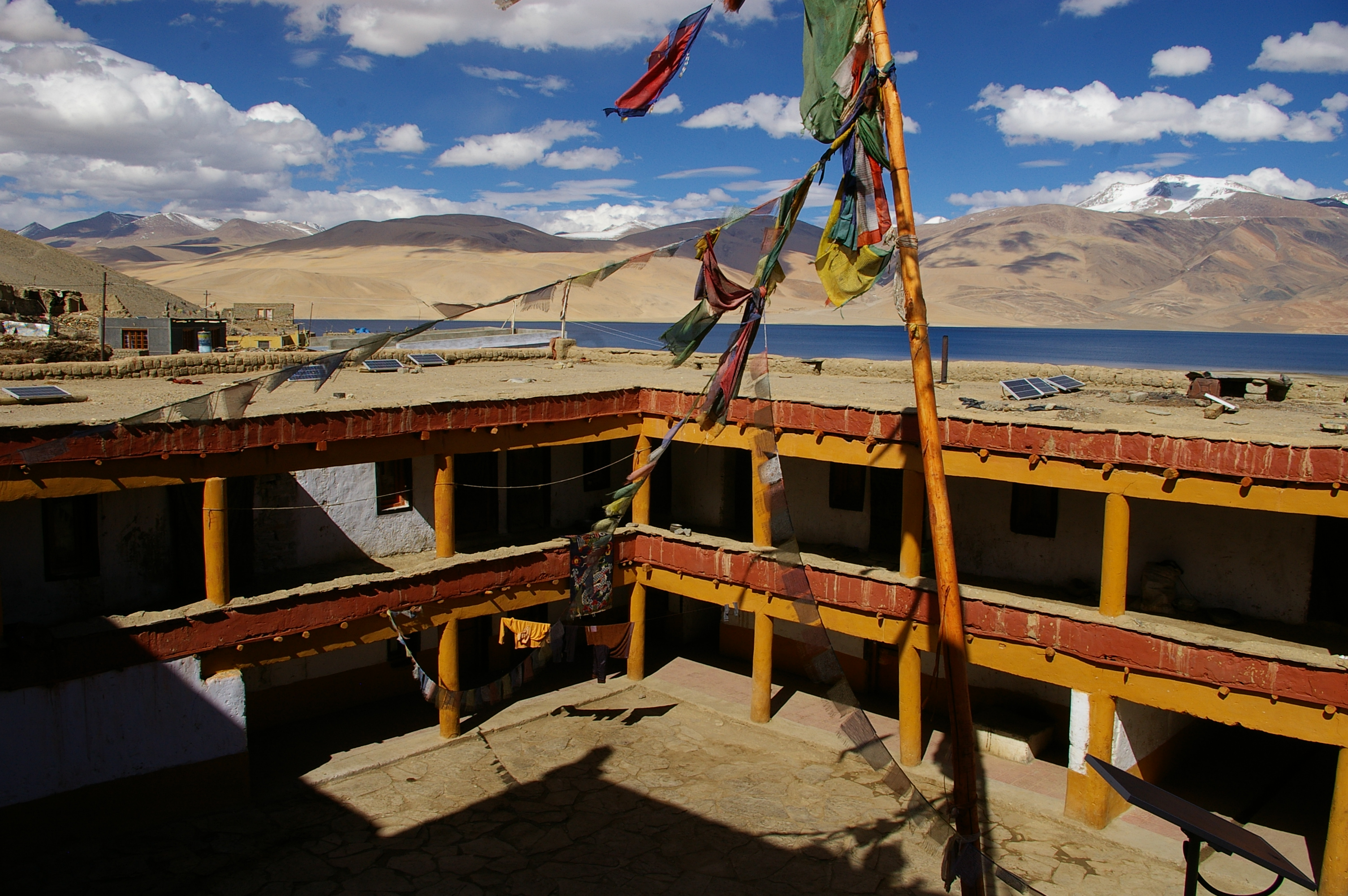
View of the Korzok Monastery

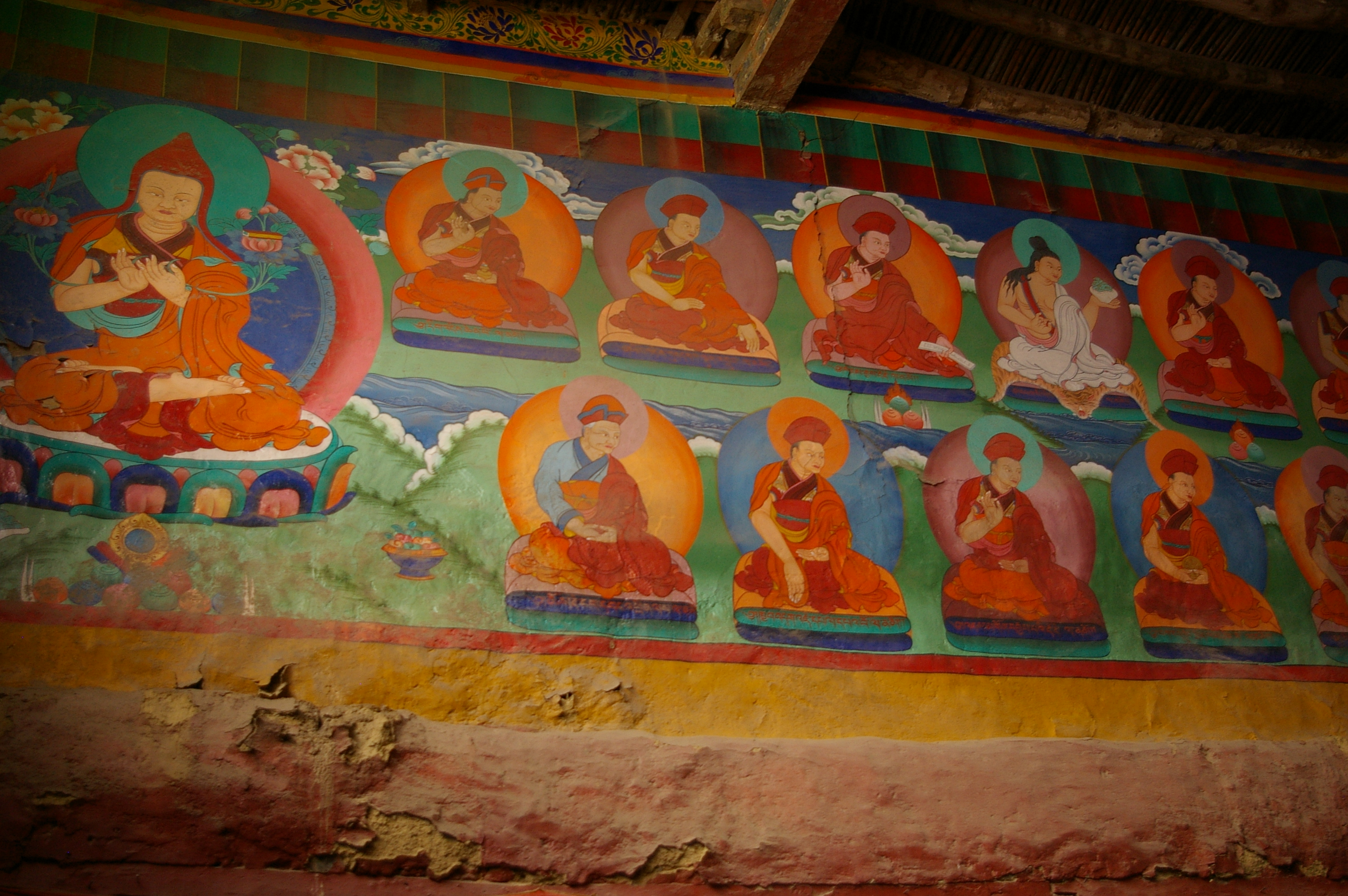
Painting in the Korzok Monastery

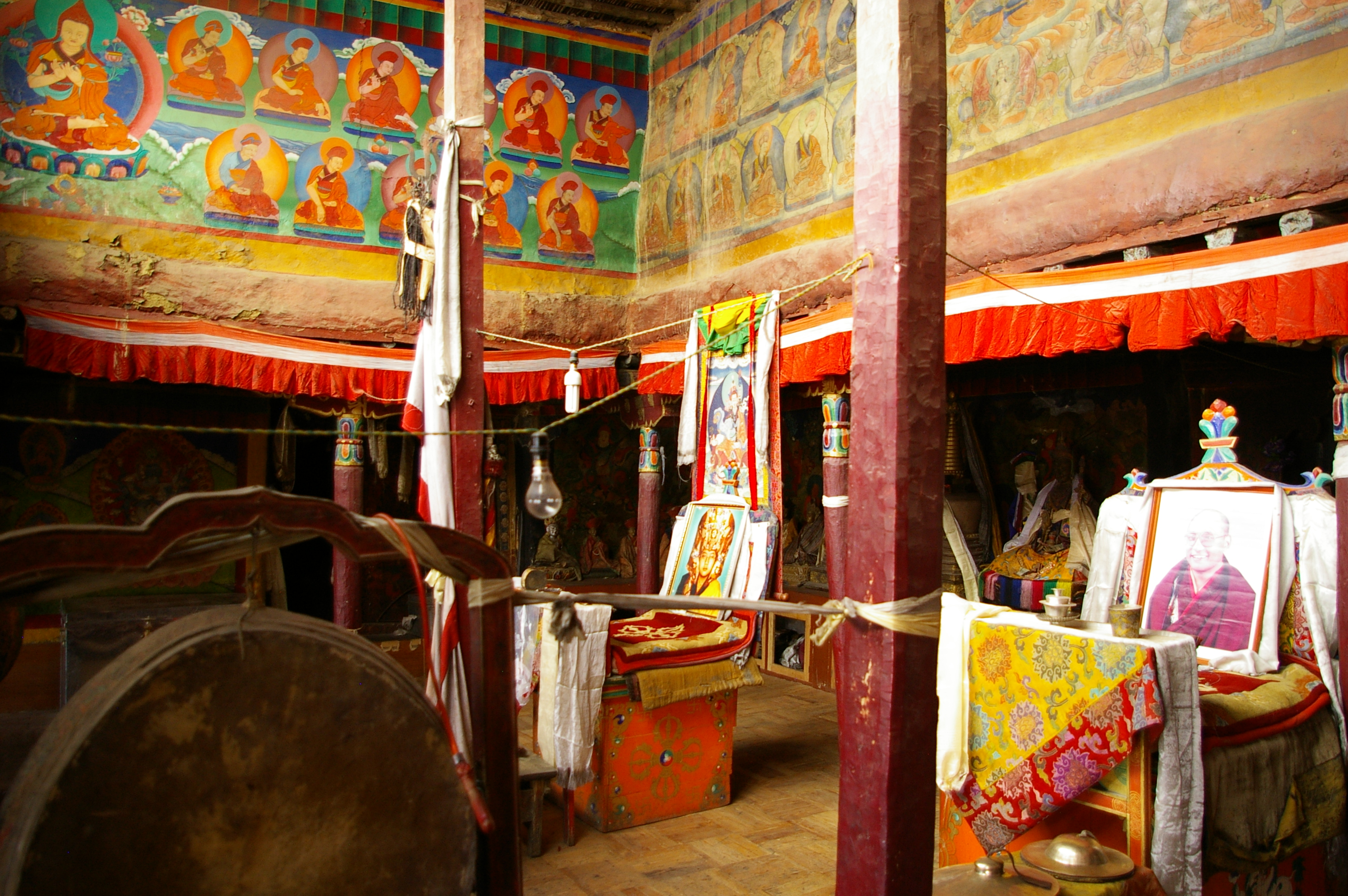
Paintings in the Korzok Monastery

== See also ==
- List of Buddhist monasteries in Ladakh
- Tourism in Ladakh
