= List of Himalayan monasteries and shrines =

List of Himalayan monasteries and shrines is a list of Buddhist monasteries and shrines in the Himalayas.

== History ==
Buddhism had spread to the Himalayan region before CE. It is evident from the fact that during 3rd century BC, Emperor Ashoka visited Nepal. ] Vajrayana Buddhism spread to Tibet during the reign of Songtsen Gampo.

Consequently, great Buddhist Masters like Vasubandhu, Santarakshaka and Padmasambhava visited Tibet. This led to the establishment of Buddhist Monasteries all along Himalayas and Tibetan Plateau.

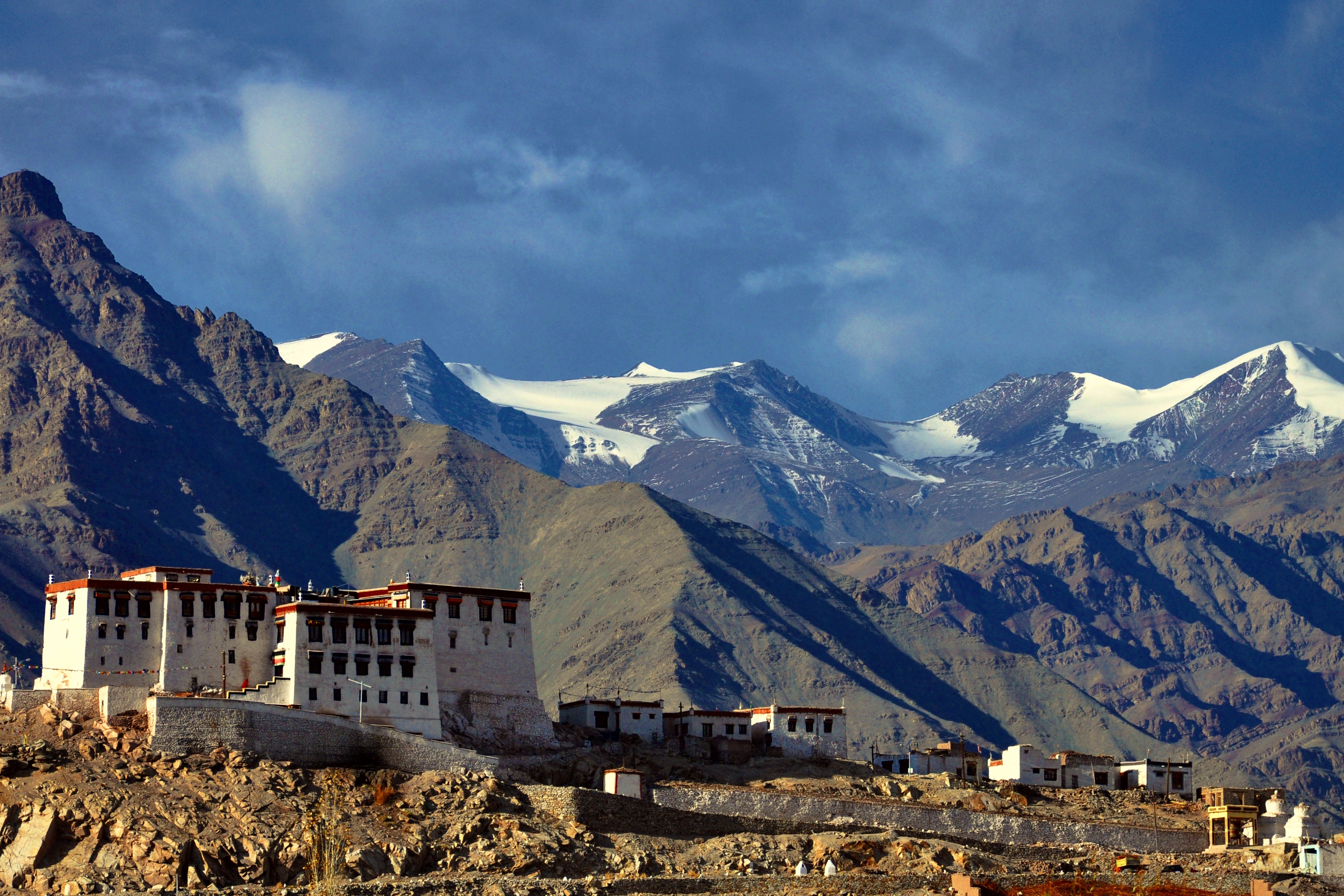
Himalayan Monastery

Vajrayana Buddhism is followed almost all along the Himalayas Himalayan range. Monasteries of Vajrayana Buddhism are found throughout Himalayan range in Tibet, Nepal, Bhutan and Pakistan; the earliest being Samye Monastery Samye in Tibet.

The religious structures of Vajrayana Buddhism in the Himalayan belt are seen as Monasteries, Lhakhangs/ Gomphas and Chortens. In Mahayana Buddhism they are known as Chaityas, Viharas and Stupas, respectively.

Monasteries also display colourful motifs and thangkas on its walls.

== Rituals ==
Tibetan Buddhist monasteries are known for their rich culture and traditions, which are deeply rooted in the teachings of Buddhism. One of the most important aspects of Tibetan Buddhist monasteries is the presence of ritualistic places, which are dedicated to various deities and spiritual practices. Here are some of the most common ritualistic places found in Tibetan Buddhist monasteries and what they are called:

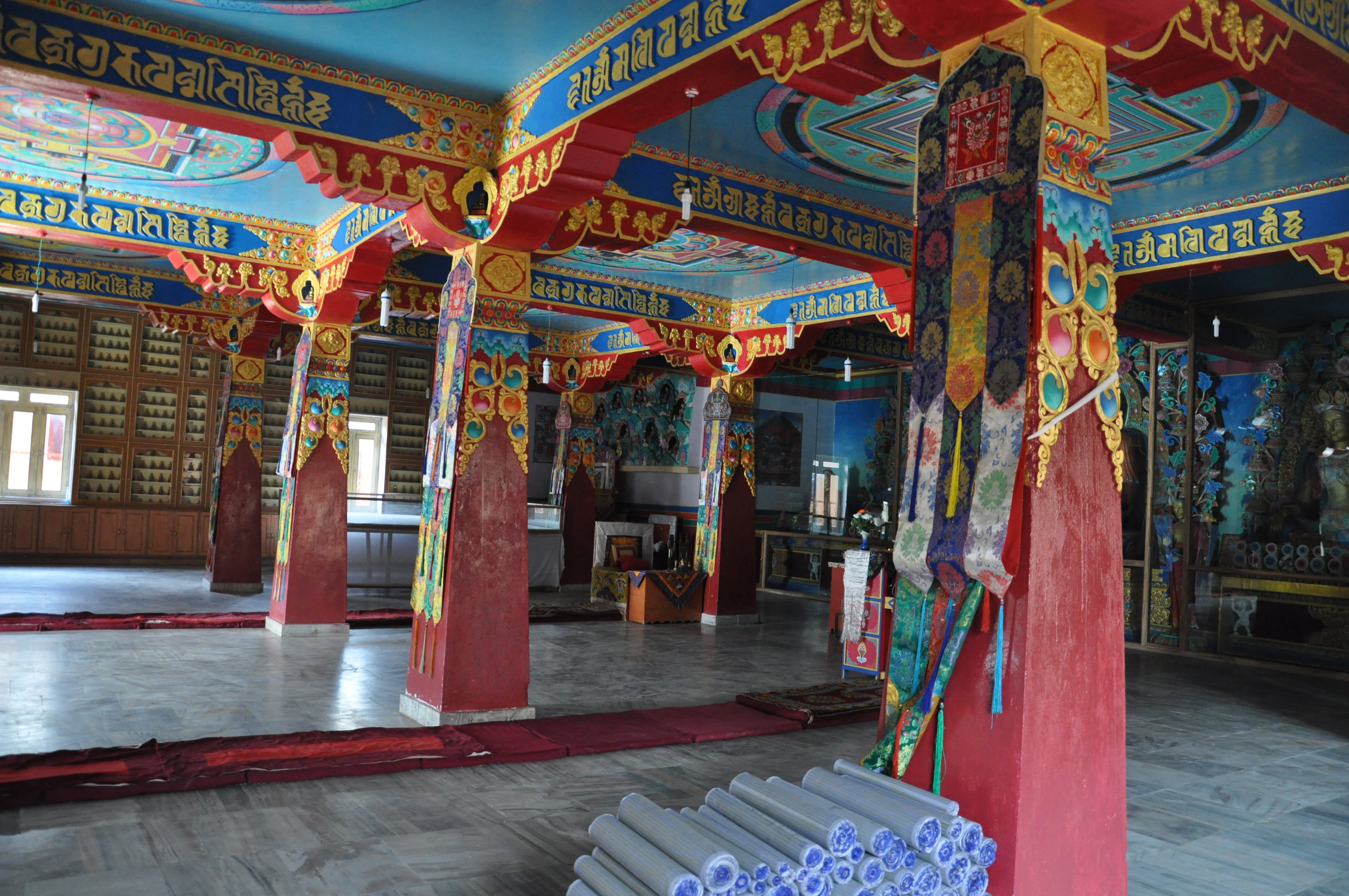
Dukhang: the central prayer hall

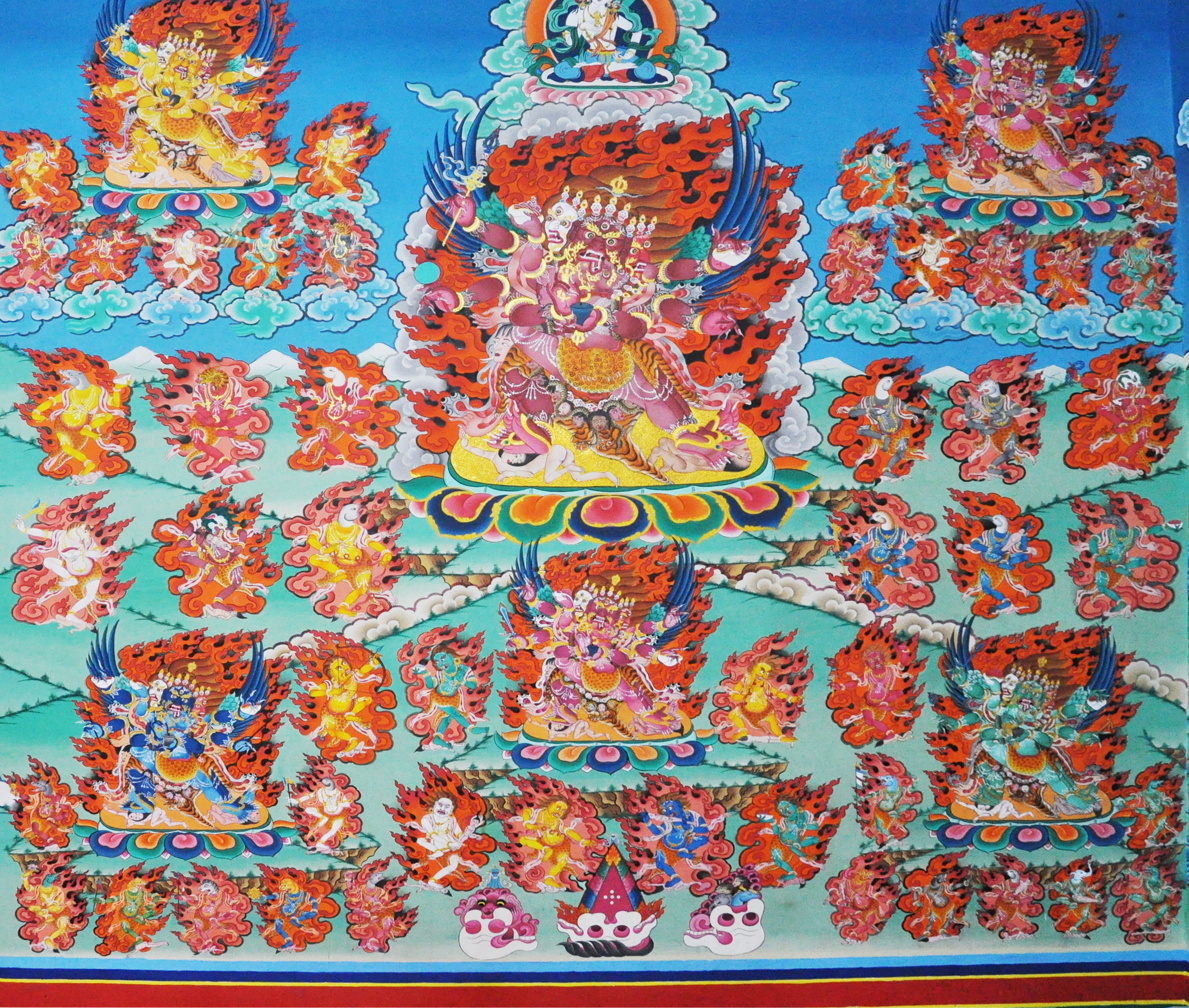
Murals on Monastery walls

- Dukhang: The shrine room is the most important ritualistic place in a Tibetan Buddhist monastery. It is a sacred space where monks and laypeople gather to perform prayers, offerings, and other rituals. The shrine room is often adorned with statues, thangkas (religious paintings), and other symbolic objects that represent the Buddha and other deities.

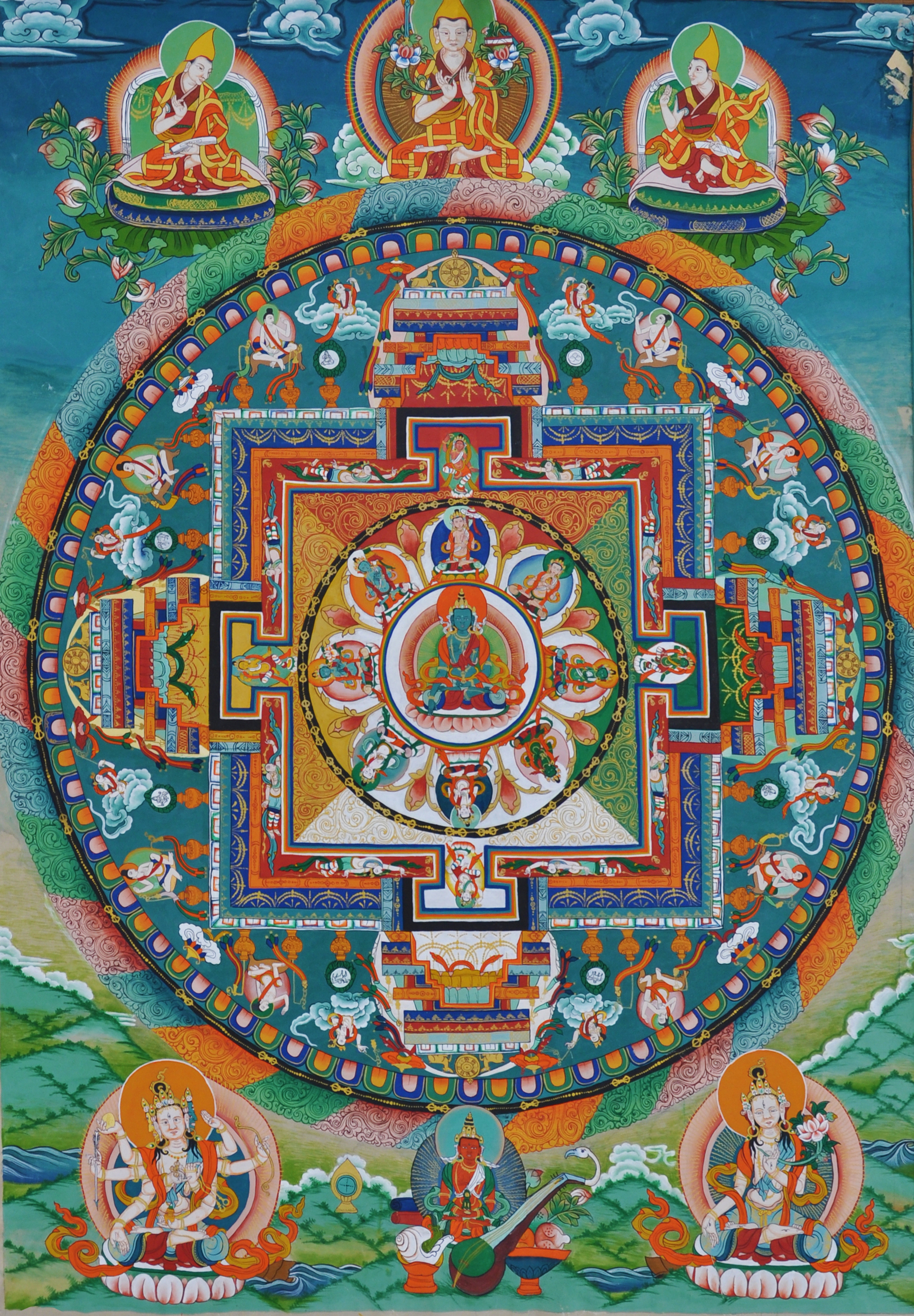
Akshyobhya mandala Shey palace

- Lahkhang is the inner sanctum of the monastery, where the most sacred relics, statues, and thangkas (religious paintings) are housed. It is typically located in the central courtyard of the monastery and is considered to be the most sacred and holiest part of the monastery. The Lahkhang is only accessible to the monks and is used for meditation and religious ceremonies.

- Gompa : The place for tantric practices and meditation in Tibetan monasteries is called the "Gompa" or "Meditation Hall." This is a dedicated space within the monastery where practitioners engage in advanced spiritual practices, including tantric rituals, visualization, and meditation.

The Gompa is typically located within the monastery complex and is designed to facilitate deep concentration and inner exploration. The space is usually large, with minimal furnishings, and may be decorated with symbolic images and objects that are relevant to the particular practices being undertaken.

Within the Gompa, practitioners may work with a qualified teacher or guide to deepen their understanding of tantric practices and meditation. They may engage in practices that involve the recitation of mantras, visualization of deities, or other advanced techniques that are aimed at achieving spiritual realization.

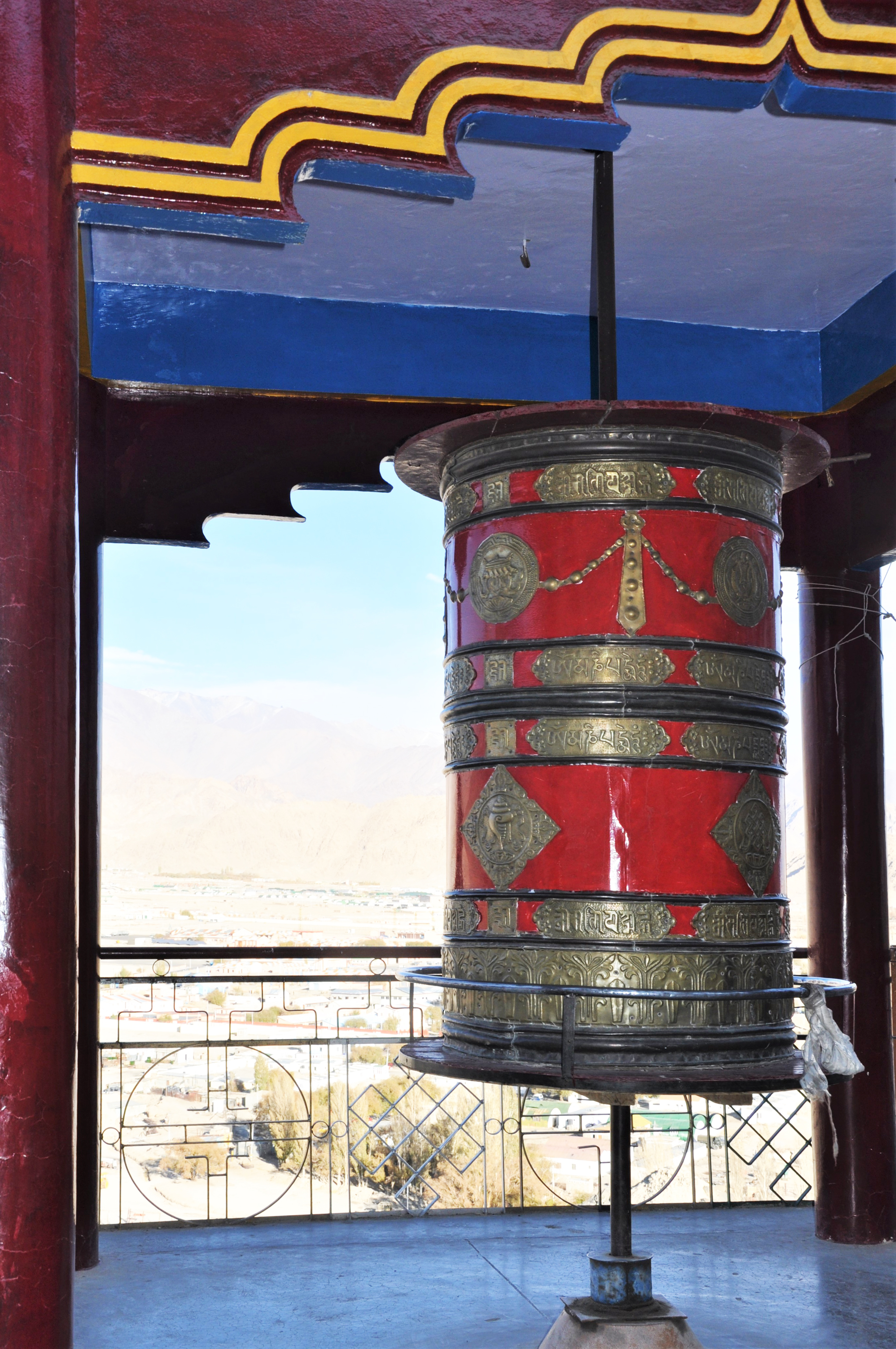
Prayer Wheel at Spituk Monastery India

- Stupa: A stupa is a dome-shaped structure that represents the Buddha's body, speech, and mind. It is a ritualistic place where devotees perform circumambulation (walking around the stupa in a clockwise direction), offer prayers, and make offerings. Stupas are considered to be powerful spiritual objects that radiate positive energy and blessings.

- Chorten: A chorten is a small stupa that is used as a ritualistic place for meditation and offerings. Chortens are often found in the courtyards of Tibetan Buddhist monasteries and are used by monks and laypeople alike.

- Mandala: A mandala is a geometric pattern that represents the universe and is used as a ritualistic place for meditation and visualization. Mandalas are often created using coloured sand or other materials and are destroyed after the ritual is complete, symbolizing the impermanence of all things.Murals on Tibetan Buddhist monasteries

- Prayer Wheel: A prayer wheel is a cylindrical wheel that is inscribed with mantras or prayers. It is a ritualistic place where devotees spin the wheel in a clockwise direction, believing that each turn of the wheel generates positive energy and blessings.

These ritualistic places are an integral part of Tibetan Buddhist monasteries and are used by monks and laypeople alike to connect with their spiritual practice and the teachings of Buddhism

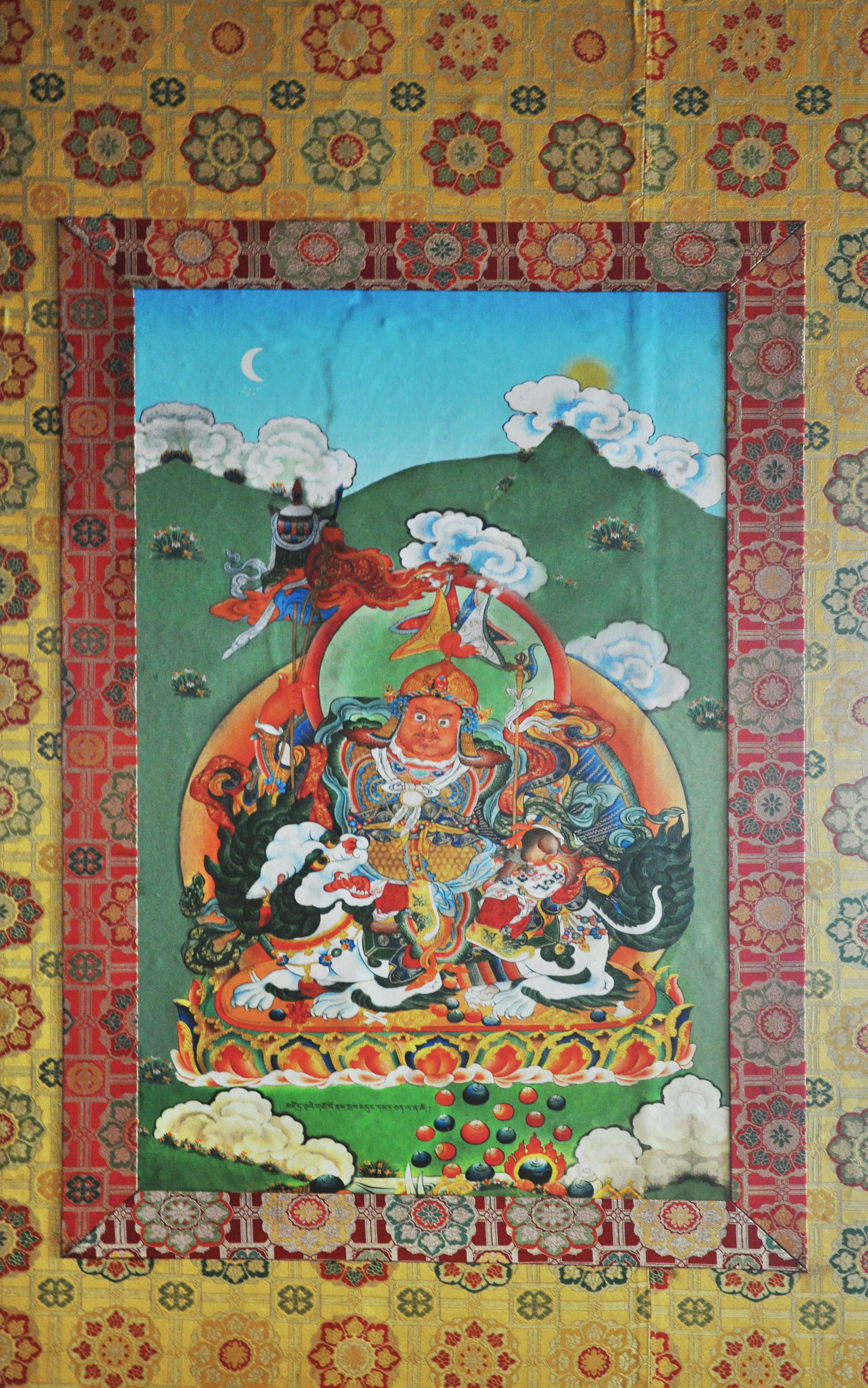
Thangka at Ralang Monastery

== List of Himalayan monasteries and shrines ==
Sr. No.	Monastery/Gompha	Image	Description
1	Gorsam Chortan	Gorsam Stupa, Zemithang India	Gorsam Chorten (Stupa) is at Zemithang 90 km from Tawang. The stupa is 186 feet base and 93 feet high, built in 12 century AD by Monk Lama Pradhar. It is built to resembles 5 century AD, Boudhnath Stupa in Nepal. Chendebji Chortan in Bhutan is of similar design.
2	Kungri Monastery	Kungri Monastery – India	Kungri Gompha is Vajrayana Buddhist temple, Kungri Monastery is located in the Himalayan region India. It was built in 1330. The Gompha has exquisite murals painted on its walls depicting deities of Vajrayana pantheon..
3	Lachung Monastery	Lachung Monastery, Sikkim India	Lachung Monastery was built in 1880 situated in North Sikkim, India. Originally a Bon Monastery is now a Niyamapa Monastery
4	Namchi Monastery	Namchi monastery Decchen Choyling Gumpa Sikkim India	Namchi Buddhist Monastery is situated in Sikkim, India. Namchi Monastery has Decchen Choyling Gumpa built in 1948. In the same premises there is a Nunnery.
5	Sang Monastery	Sang Monastery, Sikkim India	Sang Monastery – Karma Dubgyu Chokhorling Monastery, Sikkim built in 1912 AD. Sang Monastery belongs to Kagyupa sect of Vajrayana Buddhism
6	Thiksey Monastery	Thiksey Monastery Ladakh India	Thiksey Monastery was built during 15th century. This Monastery belongs to Gelugpa Sect of Vajrayana Buddhism located at Leh, Ladakh, India
7	Ugyenling Monastery	Ugyenling monastery	The Ugyenling monastery was built around 1487 by Ugyen Zangpo, the youngest brother of Terton Pemalinga. The monastery is situated at Tawang India
8	Bomdila Monastery	Bomdilla Monastery (middle) India	Gontse Gaden Rabgyel Lling Monastery is an important Monastery of Mahayana school of thought. It was built by the 12th reincarnate of Tsona Gontse Rinpoche in 1965–66. It is situated at Tawang in Arunachal Pradesh India. There are three gompas; middle Gompa is the oldest of all.
9	Kurje Lkhang	Kurje lakhang Bhumtang	Kurje Lhakhang is a Vajrayana Buddhist Shrine built in 1652 by Mingyur Tenpa at Bhumtang, Bhutan. It is surrounded by 108 chorten walls. The complex houses three revered temples, namely: Guru Lhakhang, Sampa Lhundrup Lhakhang and Ka Gon Phor Sum Lhakhang.
10	Druk Wangyal Lhakhang	Druk Wangyal Lhakhang Bhutan	Druk Wangyal Lhakhang at 108 Chortens, Dochu La pass Bhutan. It is built in 2008 as memorial to celebrate 100 years of monarchy in Bhutan.
11	Lippa Monastery	Lippa Monastery, Himachal Pradesh, India	Lippa Monastery is situated at Himachal Pradesh, India.The construction was started by Pandit Deva Ram ( 1744) and completed by his son Lama Sonam Dubkey. It is at an altitude of 2438 meters. The Monastery temple is called Goldang Chakodar and houses the ancient religious texts – The Kangyur and Tangyur.
12	Likir Monastery	Likir Monastery Ladakh India	Likir Monastery was built during 11th century by Lhachen Gyalopo. It is situated In Ladakh region of India. The monastery is identified with 23 meters statue of Maitreya Buddha.
13	Labrang Monastery	Labrang Monastery with eight sided roof	Labrang Monastery was built in 1843. It belongs to the Nyingmapa School of Tibetan Buddhism. Labrang Monastery was built in characteristic Sikkimese architecture of Rinchhen Surgyeor; the eight sided diamond. It symbolizes indestructibility.
14	Enchey Monastery	Enchey Monastery, Sikkim, India	Enchey Monastery was established in 1909. It belongs to the Nyingmapa School of Tibetan Buddhism. The Monastery is located in Sikkim, India
15	Yang Drung Bon Monastery (Shurishing Yungdrung Dungdrakling Bon Monastery )	Yang Drung Bon Monastery at Kewzing India	Shurishing Yungdrung Dungdrakling Bon Monastery is located in Kewzing, Sikkim, India. It is a 1980 Monastery built in Indo-Tibetan style. The monastery has paintings of Bon Demonical Buddha and Bon Deity. Yung Dung school of Bon was founded by Shenrab Miwoche during 14th century.
16	Tachog Lhakhang – Tamchoe Monastery	Tachog Lhakhang – Tamchoe Monastery, Paro, Bhutan	Tachog Lhakhang means “temple of the hill of the excellent horse.” The temple was built in 1420 by the architect Thangtong Gyalpo, "Iron Bridge Maker". The Monastery is famous for the iron bridge leading to it, laid on Paro River.[1] The monastery is situated at Paro, Bhutan.
17	Tashiding Monastery, Sikkim	Tashiding Monastery, Sikkim, India	Tashiding Monastery is a Buddhist monastery of the Nyingma sect was founded in 1641. Ngadak Sempa Chembo. This is the main 'Tashiding Gompa' which is called as Chogyal Lhakhang. Tashiding Monastery is situated in Sikkim, India.
18	Lhodrak Kharchu Monastery	Lhodrak Kharchu Monastery	Lhodrak Kharchu monastery was built in the 1990s in the traditional Dzong architectural style. It belongs to Nyingma sect of Vajrayana Buddhism. The monastery is located in Bhutan
19	Jambay lhakhang Bhutan	Jambay lakhang Bhutan	Jambay Lhakhang is located in Bhumtang, Bhutan. This is an ancient shrine believed to have been built by 7 century Tibetan king Songtsen Gampo. Songtsen Gampo built a series of 108 temples throughout the Himalayas, each one helping to pin down the demoness. Jambay Lhakhang was intended to pin down the left knee of the demoness. Kichyu Lhakhang is one another Shrine. Gyatso, J. (1987). Down with the demoness: reflections on a feminine ground in Tibet. Feminine ground: Essays on women and Tibet.
20	Sangchen Dorji Lhendrup Nunnery, Bhutan	Sangchen Dorji Lhendrup Nunnery	Sangchen Dorji Lhendrup Numnnery Bhutan, The Nunnery was established in 2015 as a Buddhist college for Nuns. The shrine has a14 feet bronze statue of Avalokitesvara, tallest in Bhutan. The Stupa in the vicinity is modelled on Swayam-Bhunath Stupa of Nepal,
21	Kanum Monastery, India	Kanum Monastery, Himachal Pradesh India	Kanum Monastery is 12 century Monsatery belonging to Drukpa sect of Vajrayana Buddhism. It houses idol of Avalokiteshwara. The monastery has evidence of a Hungarian Scholar and explorer, Alexander Csoma de Körös (1784–1842) working there. . The monastery is located in Himachal Pradesh, India Le Calloc’h, Bernard. “Kanum, the Village of Alexander Csoma de Körös A Narrative of Werner Hoffmeister. ” The Tibet Journal, vol. 21, no. 1, 1996, pp. 47–57. JSTOR, JSTOR 43300561. Accessed 27 Feb. 2023.
22	Zangdokpalri Monastery, India (Durpin Gompa)	Zangdokpalri Monastery India	Zangdokpalri Monastery is also known as Durpin Gompa located at Kalimpong, West Bengal, India, This a Nyingma monastery, originally established by Dudjom Rinpoche 1946,
23	Rabong Gompa, Sikkim India	Rabong Gompa – New, Sikkim, India	Rabong Monastery is also called as the Mani Choekerling Complex (in set). This is situated near Tathagatha Stal (Hindi: तथागत स्थल) at Sikkim India. Rabong Monastery was built in the Sikkimese traditional architecture known as “Rinchhen Surgye”. It belongs to the Karma Kagyupa lineage. The Complex houses Mani Lhakhang, Guru Lhakhang among others. References: 1. "Rabong Monastery and its Preservation" by Jigme T. Lachungpa. In "Buddhist Himalayas: People, Faith and Nature", edited by K.S. Singh and Madhu Jain, pp. 263–270. Delhi: Book Faith India, 2009. 2. "The Rabong Monastery and Its Cultural Landscape" by Ugen T. Bhutia. In "Himalayan Research Bulletin", vol. 33, no. 2, pp. 49–54. Kathmandu: Association for Nepal and Himalayan Studies, 2013.: 3. "The Cultural Heritage of Rabong Monastery, Sikkim" by Doma Tshering. In "The Indian Journal of Social Work", vol. 67, no. 1, pp. 77–86.; Mumbai: Tata Institute of Social Sciences, 2006.
24	Ralang Monastery, Sikkim, India	Ralang Monastery, Sikkim, India	Ralang Monastery was established in the 18th century by the 9th Karmapa, Wangchuk Dorje, It is located in Sikkim, India. The Monastery is associated with Karma Kagyu school of Tibetan Buddhism. References: 1. Kapadia, Harish. Ralang Monastery: An Architectural Survey. New Delhi: IGNCA, 1998.; 2. Martin, Dan. Ralang Monastery: A History. Sikkim: Palchen Choeling Monastic Institute, 2012
25	Gangtey Monastery, Bhutan	Gangtey Monastery Bhutan	The monastery was built in the 17th century by Gyalse Pema Thinley, The architecture of Gangtey Gompa is typical of Bhutanese monasteries. It is located in the Phobjikha Valley of Bhutan. References :
26	Chedibje Chorten Bhutan	Chedibje Chorten Bhutan	Chendebji Chorten is Nepalese style stupas such as Boudhanath. It was built during 18th century by Lam Oensey Tshering Wangchuk The Chendebji Chorten is a four-sided structure, each side featuring a large, painted image of one of the four Buddhas of the Vajrayana tradition. It is situated at Trongsa, Bhutan Ref: https://www.atlasobscura.com/places/chendebji-chorten (accessed on 26 March 2023)
27	Rupa Monastery, Arunachal Pradesh, India	Rupa Monastery (Pedma Churling Zandok Parley Monastery) Arunachal Pradesh India	Rupa Monastery is a Buddhist monastery located in the West Kameng district of Arunachal Pradesh, India. It is also called Pedma Churling Zandok Parley Monastery. It belongs to Nyingmapa school of Tibetan Buddhism. https://ignca.gov.in/online-digital-resources/archaeological-sites/arunachal-pradesh/rupa-monastry/ (accessed on 26 March 2023)
28	Jangi Monastery Gompa Himchal Pradesh India	Jangi Monastery Gompa Himacha Pradesh l India	Jangi Monastery Gompa Himchal Pradesh Jangi Monastery is a Buddhist monastery located in Kinnaur district of Himachal Pradesh. The monastery is also known as the Kinnaur Monastery. It belongs to GelugPa school of Vajrayana Buddhism. https://whav.aussereurop.univie.ac.at/ic/4237/ (accessed on 26 March 2023)
29	Stok Monastery, Ladakh, India	Stok Monastery Ladakh, India	Stok monastery was built in the 14th century by a lama Lhawang Lotus. The gompa is affiliated to Gelugpa or the Yellow Hat sect of Buddhism.
30	Sakya Tangyud Mionastery, Kaza, India	Sakya Tangyud Monastery, Kaza, India	Sakya Tangyud Monastery, belongs to the Sakya school of Tibetan Buddhism, located in Kaza, Himachal Pradesh, India. The monastery was established in 1971 by the late Khempo Tashi Gyaltsen, It is one of the largest and most important monasteries of the Sakya school outside of Tibet. References: 1. Alaka Atreya Chudal, "Sakya Monasteries in India and Bhutan, published in Himalaya, the Journal of the Association for Nepal and Himalayan Studies, Vol. 17, No. 1, 1997.: 2. Kaushik P.D., "The Monasteries of Spiti Valley: Sakya Tangyud and Kye Gompa", published in The Tibet Journal, Vol. 15, No. 2, Summer 1990.
31	Memorial Chorten, Bhutan	Memorial Chorten, Thimpu, Bhutan	The Memorial Chorten is a 51.5 meters tall, stupa located in Thimphu, Bhutan. It was built in 1974 in memory of the third king of Bhutan, Jigme Dorji Wangchuck, "father of modern Bhutan". References: 1. Karma Phuntsho, "Buddhism in Bhutan: A Historical Survey", published in Journal of Bhutan Studies, Vol. 1, No. 1, 1999.; 2. Michael Aris, "The Religious Iconography of Bhutan", published in Artibus Asiae, Vol. 37, No. 2/3, 1975.
32	Rumtek Monastery (New), Sikkim India	Rumtek Monastery (New) Sikkim, India	Rumtek Monastery is known as the Dharma Chakra Centre. The Monastery was rebuilt in the 1960s by the 16th Karmapa, Rangjung Rigpe Dorje. The monastery is the main seat of the Karmapa lineage, It is located in Sikkim, India Rumtek Monastery is known as the Dharma Chakra Centre. It is the main seat of the Karmapa lineage, References: 1. Martin, P. (2005). Sacred Spaces and Cultural Identity: The Rumtek Monastery in Sikkim. Asian Anthropology, 4(2), 149–169.; 2. Situ, R. (2003). The Golden Lama of Rumtek: A Social History of the Karmapas of Tibet. Boston: Shambhala Publications.; 3. Datta, D. (2015). Buddhism in the Northeast: The Case of Rumtek Monastery in Sikkim. Indian Journal of Social Science Researches, 12(2), 101–106.
33	Rumtek Monastery (Old), Sikkim, India	Rumtek Monastery,(New) Sikkim, India	Rumtek Monastery is known as the Dharma Chakra Centre. It was originally built during 18th Century. The monastery is the main seat of the Karmapa lineage, It is located in Sikkim, India References: 1. Martin, P. (2005). Sacred Spaces and Cultural Identity: The Rumtek Monastery in Sikkim. Asian Anthropology, 4(2), 149–169.; 2. Situ, R. (2003). The Golden Lama of Rumtek: A Social History of the Karmapas of Tibet. Boston: Shambhala Publications.; 3. Datta, D. (2015). Buddhism in the Northeast: The Case of Rumtek Monastery in Sikkim. Indian Journal of Social Science Researches, 12(2), 101–106.
34	DoDrul Chorten Sikkim Inida	Dodrul Chorten Sikkim India	It is situated at Gangtok city of Sikkim India. The stupa was built in 1945 by Trulshik Rinpoche. It belong to Nyingma tradition of Tibetan Buddhism.
35	Lachen Monastery Sikkim, India	Lachen Monastery Sikkim India	Lachen Monastery, also known as Ngodub Choling Monastery. It is a Buddhist monastery located in the Lachen Valley of North Sikkim, India. Lachen Monastery is also known as Ngodub Choling Monastery. It was built in 1858 AD by the Nyingma Sect of Tibetan Buddhism. References: 1. H. K. Sharma : "Religion and Society in Sikkim: A Historical Perspective" in "Himalayan Anthropology: The Indo-Tibetan Interface" edited by Mahesh Sharma, 2003., M.D. Publications Pvt. Ltd.: 2. Jigme Norbu : "Buddhist Monasteries in Sikkim: An Overview", "Buddhism in South Asia: Studies in Regional Diversity"; edited by Mahesh Deokar and Peter Skilling, 2018. published by Routledge
36	Phensang Monastery, Sikkim India	Phensang Monastery, Sikkim India	Phensang Monastery is a Buddhist monastery located in Sikkim, India. The monastery was founded in 1721 during the ruling period of Jigme Pawo. It belongs to the Nyingmapa sect of Buddhism, References: 1. O.C. Handa "Buddhist Monasteries of Himachal Pradesh" (Indus Publishing Company, 2005; 2. P.C. Jain and Daljeet "The Buddhist Monasteries of Sikkim", Motilal Banarsidass Publishers, 2007
37	Thongsa Gompa, Kalimpong, India	Thongsa Gompha, Kalimpong India	Thongsa Gompa is also known as the Bhutanese Monastery. It was originally built in 1692 CE and reconstructed during 19th century. Gompa belongs to Nyingmapa School of Buddhism https://www.lonelyplanet.com/india/west-bengal/kalimpong/attractions/thongsa-gompa/a/poi-sig/1284687/356542
38	Basgo Monastery, Gompa	Basgo Monastery Gompa Ladakh, India	Basgo Monastery is a mud-brick fortress. The monastery was built in the 16th century by the Namgyal dynasty. The monastery holds a 14-meter-high, gilded statue of the Maitreya Buddha. References 1.Gergan Dorje Thakur : "Ladakh: A Himalayan Treasures", published by Niyogi Books 2. Martijn van Beek and Jan van der Putten (Ed): "Ladakh: Culture, History and Development Between Himalaya and Karakoram", published by Brill: 3. Nawang Tsering Shakspo :"Basgo: An Iconographic Analysis", published by Motilal Banarsidass; https://www.wmf.org/project/basgo-gompa-maitreya-temples
39	Alchi Monastery: Sumtsek Gompa, Ladakh, India	Sumtsek Gompa at Alchi Monastery, Ladakh India	Sumtsek Gompa at Alchi Monastery was built in the 11th century and is known for its unique blend of Indian and Tibetan architectural styles. Alchi monastery holds Dukhang, and Manjushri Temple, in the same premises. References: 1. Prem Singh Jina "The Buddhist Monasteries of Ladakh", published by Indus Publishing Company; 2. Sumit Seth "Alchi: The Living Heritage of Ladakh", published by Niyogi Books; 3. Roger Goepper : “Alchi, the Oldest Buddhist Monastery in the Upper Indus Valley: Its History and Artistic Significance", published by Artibus Asiae Publishers; 4. Erberto Lo Bue,"The Iconography of the Buddhist Sculpture of Alchi, Western Himalayas, India" by published by River Books.
40	Nathang Monastery, Sikkim, India	Nathang Monastery Sikkim India	Nathang Monastery is a relatively small monastery, established in the 17th century. It is located in Nubra Valley of Ladakh India. The place is also significant for a battle between British and Tibetan forces, during 19th century. https://sikkimtourism.org/nathang-valley/
41	Rewalsar Monastery, Himachal Pradesh, India	Rewalsar Monastery, Himachal Pradesh, India	Rewalsar Monastery, also known as Tso-Pema Monastery. It is a Buddhist monastery in Himachal Pradesh, India. The monastery belongs to the Nyingma sect of Tibetan Buddhism. It is believed to be found in 12th century by Guru Rinpoche, the great master of Varayana Buddhism. References: 1. Nawang Tsering Shakspo: "Rewalsar Monastery: A Cultural and Historical Survey" (2010, Indus Publishing Company); 2. Pratapaditya Pal: "The Art of Himalaya: Treasures from Nepal and Tibet" (2001, University of California Press) – includes a section on Rewalsar Monastery.; 3. O.C. Handa :"Buddhist Monasteries of Himachal Pradesh: 6th-8th Century A.D." (2003, Indus Publishing Company) – includes a chapter on Rewalsar Monastery.; 4. Sukumar Dutt "Buddhist Monasteries and Monastic Life in Ancient India: From the Third Century BC to the Seventh Century AD" (2004, Munshiram Manoharlal Publishers) – includes a section on Rewalsar Monastery
42	Pemayangtse Monastery Sikkim India	Pemayangtse Monastery Sikkim India	Pemayangtse Monastery monastery was built in 1705 by Lhatsun Namkha Jigme. It is an important monastery of the Nyingma tradition of Tibetan Buddhism. It is situated in Sikkim, India. References: 1. Parul Singh and Prashant Srivastava: "Pemayangtse Monastery: The Sacred Citadel of Nyingma Sect" (2019); 2. Peter van Ham "The Pemayangtse Monastery, Sikkim: A Study of Its Architecture and Iconography" (1993); 3.R. C. Agrawal and S. K. Saraswati: "Pemayangtse Monastery and Its Sacred Sculptures" (2008): 4. S. R. Chakravarti :"Pemayangtse Monastery: An Architectural Marvel of Sikkim" (2005)
43	Rangdum Monastery Zanskar India	Rangdum Monastery Zanskar India	Rangdum monastery was built by Gelek Yashy Takpa in the 18th century. The monastery belongs to the Gelugpa sect of Tibetan Buddhism. Rangdum Monastery -
44	Stongdey Monastery, Zanskar, India	Stongdey Monastery, Zanskar, India	Stongdey Monastery Monastery, is a Buddhist monastery located in the Zanskar region of Ladakh India. The monastery was founded in the 11th century by the famous translator Rinchen Zangpo and belongs to the Gelugpa sect. References: 1. Nawang Tsering Shakspo : "Stongdey Monastery: A Cultural and Historical Survey" (2006, Indus Publishing Company); 2. Erberto Lo Bue "Ladakh: The Stongdey Monastery" (1999, Timeless Books); 3. Nawang Tsering : "The Stongdey Monastery and Its History" (1991, Ladakh Ecological Development and Environmental Group); 4. Sarla Kumari : "Stongdey Monastery, Ladakh: The Red Hat Sect of Tibetan Buddhism" (2007); 5. Elizabeth Valdez del Alamo :"The Ritual Life of Tibetan Monks: The Monastery of Stongdey" (1992, Routledge)
45	Shanti Stupa, Ladakh, India	Shanti Stupa, Ladakh, India	Shanti Stupa is a white dome like structure. It was in built in 1991 . It was built a Japanese Buddhist organization to promote world peace and harmony. The stupa is also known as the Peace Pagoda. https://en.wikipedia.org/wiki/Shanti_Stupa,_Ladakh References: 1. "Buddhist Stupas in South Asia" by Himanshu Prabha Ray, published by Oxford University Press in 2011. 2, "The Shanti Stupa, Leh: A Case of Buddhist Pilgrimage and Tourism" by Rinsol Ganzin, published in the Journal of Heritage Tourism in 2013.; 3. "Buddhist Pilgrimage in India: The Ultimate Destination" by Swati Mitra, published by Niyogi Books in 2018,
46	Zongkhul Cave Gompa Zanskar, India	Zongkhul Cave Gompa	Zongkhul Cave Gompa is a part of monastery located in the Zanskar region, Ladakh, India. The Monastery belongs to Drukpa Kagyu school of Tibetan Buddhism. The cave monastery is said to have been founded by the famous Buddhist master Naropa in the 11th century. The monastery is at three levels. Monastery at the entrance; then steps leading up on a hill to a cave gompa and further higher is the third gompa where Saint Naropa is believed to have meditated. References : 1. "Buddhism and the Environment: A Study of the Zanskar Region of Ladakh" by Ranjan Kumar Sinha, published in the Journal of Human Ecology in 2012. 2. "Buddhist Himalayas: People, Faith and Nature" by Olivier Föllmi, published by Thames & Hudson in 2002; 3. "The Hidden Himalayas: An Anthology of Contemporary Writing" edited by Patrick French and Namita Gokhale, published by John Murray Press in 2009.
47	Sanai Gompa, Zanslar, India	Sani Gompa	Sani Gompa, also known as Sani Monastery. It is a Buddhist monastery located in the Zanskar region of Ladakh, India. It is considered to be one of the oldest monasteries dating back to the 2nd century BCE. Sani Gompa has a blend Indian and Tibetan Buddhist traditions. In the premises of monastery exists holi funerary. File:Maitreya at Sani Gompha.jpg References "Buddhism in Ladakh: A Study of the Buddhist Himalayas" by John Bray, published by Oxford University Press in 2014. "Buddhist Art in Ladakh: A Brief Overview" by Monisha Ahmed, published in the Journal of the Royal Asiatic Society in 1998.
48	Diskit Gompa Nubra valley India	Diskit Gompa Nubra valley India	Diskit Monastery is located in the Nibra valley of Ladakh, India. It was found by Changzem Tserab Zangpo during 14th century. It belongs to the Gelugpa school of Vajrayana Buddhism. During the 17th century, the monastery was heavily damaged and later reconstructed. Diskit Monastery References : "The Himalayan Masters: A Living Tradition" by Pandit Rajmani Tigunait, published by Himalayan Institute Press in 2018. "The Development of Monasteries in Ladakh" by Mariko Namba Walter, published in the Journal of Asian Humanities at Kyushu University in 2012.
49	Samtanling Gompa, Nubra valley, India	Samtanling Gompa	Samtanling Monastery is a Tibetan Buddhist monastery located in the Nubra Valley, Ladakh India. It was founded in the early 19th century by Lama Tsultrim Nima and belongs to the Gelugpa sect of Tibetan Buddhism. References: Nawang Tsering Shakspo :"Samstanling Monastery: A Cultural and Historical Survey" (2009, Indus Publishing Company) Erberto Lo Bue : "The Art of Ladakh: Studies on the Monastic Architecture and Murals" (2004, Marg Publications) P. Stobdan :"Monasteries of Ladakh" (2010, Niyogi Books) – includes a chapter on Samtanling Gompa. Monisha Ahmed and Clare Harris (Ed) :"Ladakh: Culture at the Crossroads" (2005, Marg Publications) – includes a section on Samtanling Gompa.
50	Bardan Gompa Zanskar India	Bardan Gompa Zanskar India	Bardan Monastery was founded in the 16th century by Lama Phuntsog Dorje and belongs to the Drukpa Kagyu sect of Tibetan Buddhism. The monastery is located in the Zanskar region of India References: Nawang Tsering Shakspo :"Bardan Monastery: A Cultural and Historical Survey" (2009, Indus Publishing Company) P. Stobdan: "Monasteries of Ladakh" (2010, Niyogi Books) – includes a chapter on Bardan Monastery. Clare Harris :"Himalayan Buddhist Monasteries" (2002, Oxford University Press) – includes a section on Bardan Monastery. Janet Rizvi (Ed)"Ladakh: Crossroads of High Asia" (1996, Oxford University Press) – includes a chapter on Bardan Monastery
