= Drigung Kagyud Zhadpa Dorjeeling Nunnery =

Buddhist nunnery in Bhodkharbu, Ladakh, India

- Location within Kashmir region

Religion
- Affiliation: Tibetan Buddhism
- Sect: Drikung Kagyu

Location
- Location: Bhodkharbu, Ladakh, India
- Interactive map of Drigung Kagyud Zhadpa Dorjeeling Nunnery
- Coordinates: 34.33857°N 76.57185°E

Drigung Kagyud Zhadpa Dorjeeling is a small Buddhist nunnery (gompa) located in Bhodkharbu, Ladakh, India. The nunnery follows the Drigungpa order. About 55 nuns (chomo) of different ages live there and spend their days learning about Buddhist philosophy and practising rituals.

== History ==
The nunnery has been founded by a group of nuns who shifted from Nepal to Bhodkharbu in 2008. Since then the community kept growing and developing. Nowadays it hosts nuns who are originally from Nepal as well as nuns who come from the local area. Since last year some younger nuns (nomo) have been welcomed and a full-education curriculum for the younger sisters have been set up.

== Location ==
The nunnery is located in Kargil district, Ladakh, Jammu and Kashir State, India. It is about 130 kilometres far from Leh and 80 kilometres from Kargil. It situated few hundred metres from the NH1 highway that passes through Bhodkharbu village.

== Practice ==
The nuns practice different Buddhist rituals such as vairocana puja (kunrig, 7-days puja), mask dance (Chams) and Buddha's special days puja four or five times a month. Every morning at five they make a puja in the main temple.

== Visiting ==
Every year the nunnery welcomes many foreign as well as Indian visitors. Regularly different nuns (chomo) and monks (lama) from other Buddhist nunneries and monasteries come to share teaching, learning and Buddhist practice. Furthermore, Dorjeeling nunnery has hosted several foreigners during the years for a more complete cultural and linguistic exchange.
