= Gompa =

Tibetan Buddhist and Bon religious monastery

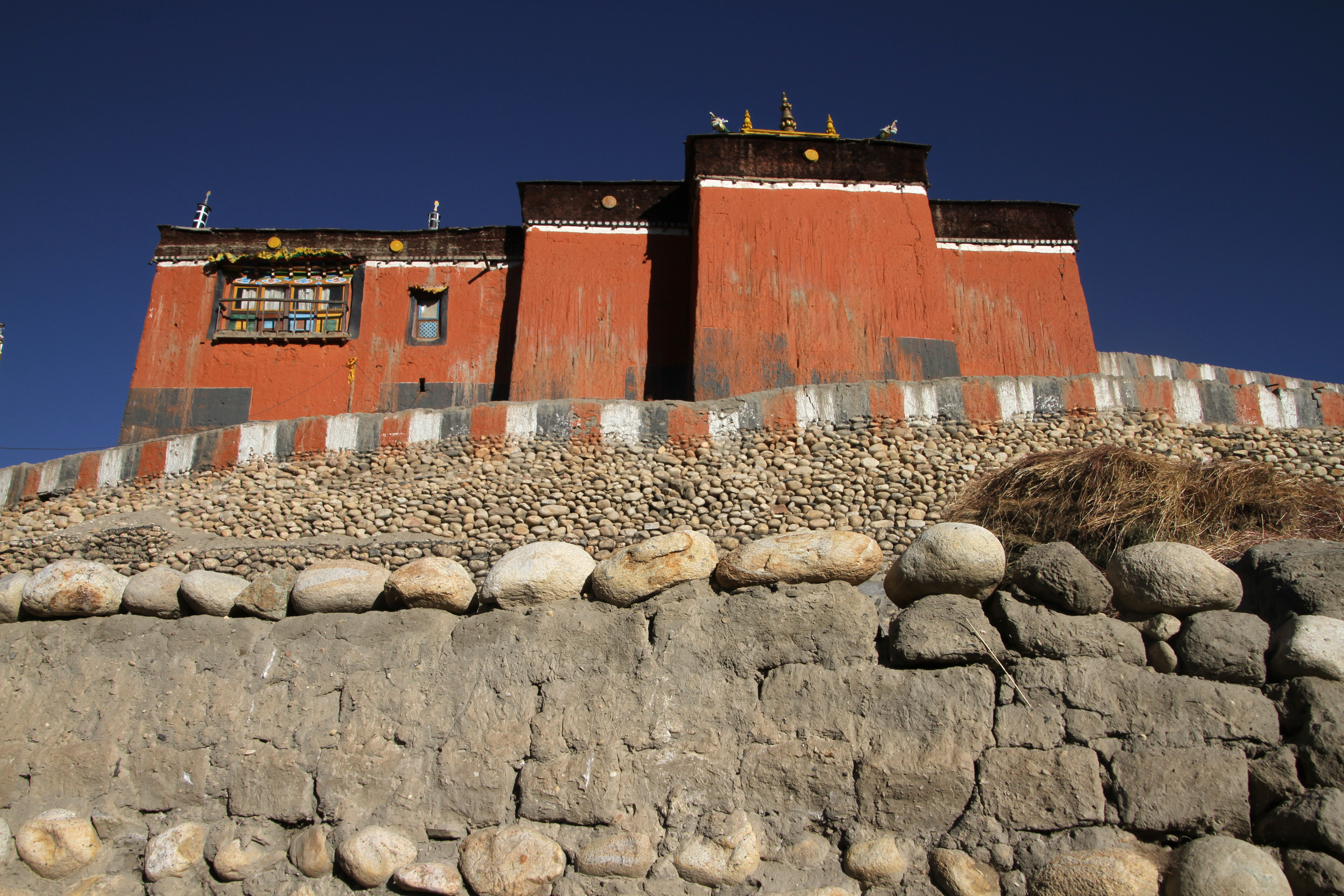
Gompa Thubten Shedrup Dhargyeling, Mustang in 2015

A Gompa or Gönpa or Gumba (Tibetan: དགོན་པ།, Wylie: dgon pa "remote place", Sanskrit araṇya), also known as ling (Wylie: gling, "island"), is a sacred Buddhist spiritual compound where teachings may be given and lineage sādhanās may be stored. They may be compared to viharas (bihars) and to a university campus with adjacent living quarters. Those gompas associated with Tibetan Buddhism are common in Tibet, India, Nepal, Bhutan, and China. Bhutanese dzong architecture is a subset of traditional gompa design.

Gompa may also refer to a shrine room or meditation room, without the attached living quarters, where practitioners meditate and listen to teachings. Shrine rooms in urban Buddhist centres are often referred to as gompas.

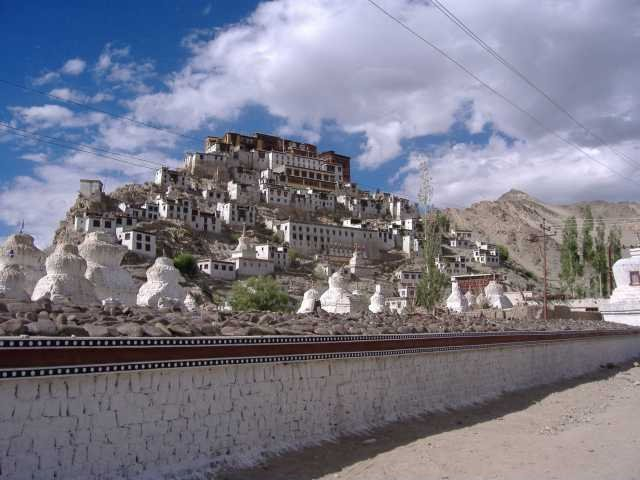
Thikse Monastery near Leh in Ladakh, India, is typical of Tibetan Buddhist gömpa design.

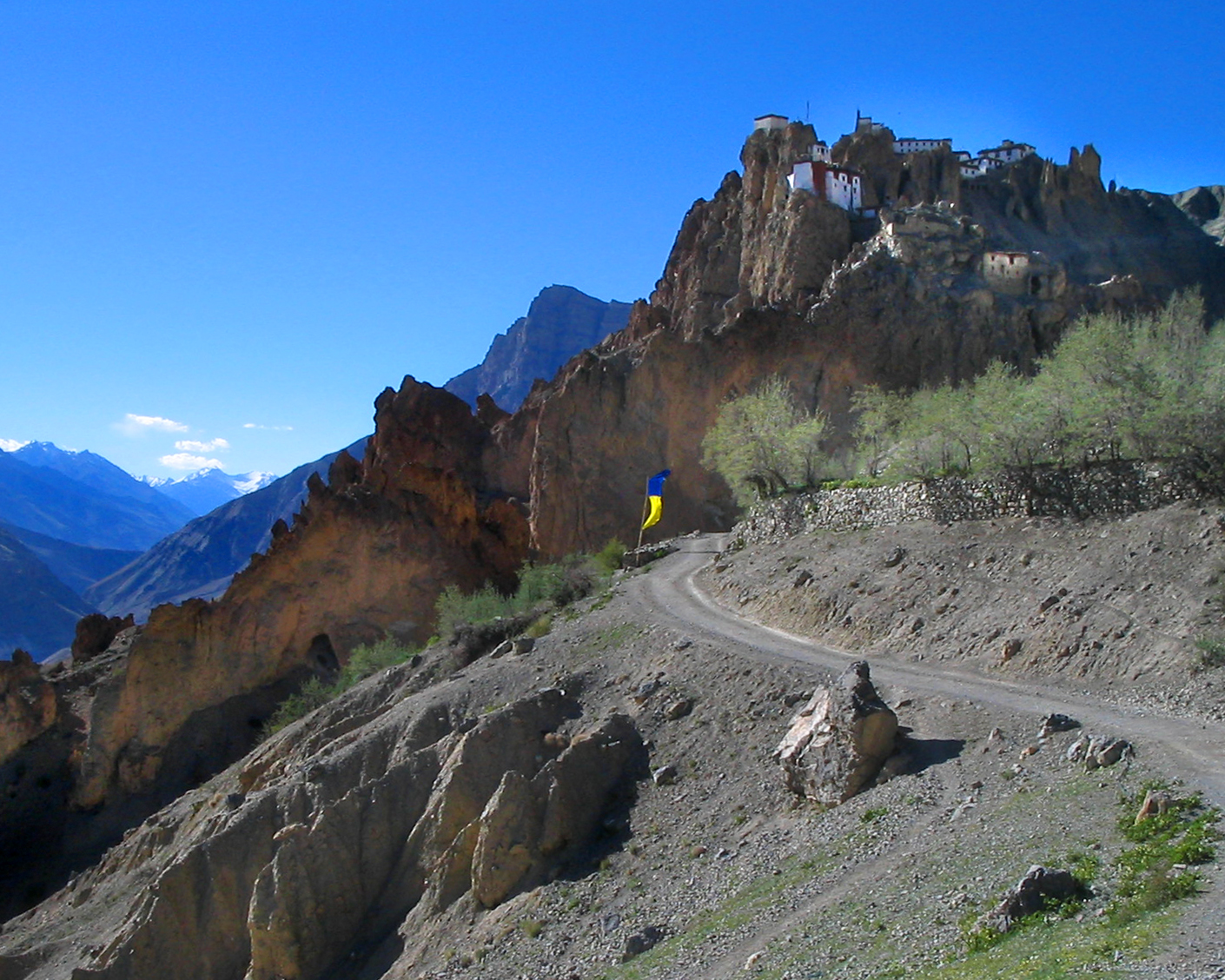
Dhankar Gompa, Spiti Valley, India.

Design and interior details vary between Buddhist lineages and from region to region. The general design usually includes a central shrine room or hall, containing statues of buddhas, wall paintings, murtis or thangkas, cushions and puja tables for monks, nuns, and lay practitioners. Often a library is on a floor above, with additional shrine rooms above. The gompa, or ling, may also be accompanied by other sacred buildings including multiple shrine rooms as at Samye Monastery in Tibet, and terraces, gardens, and stupas.

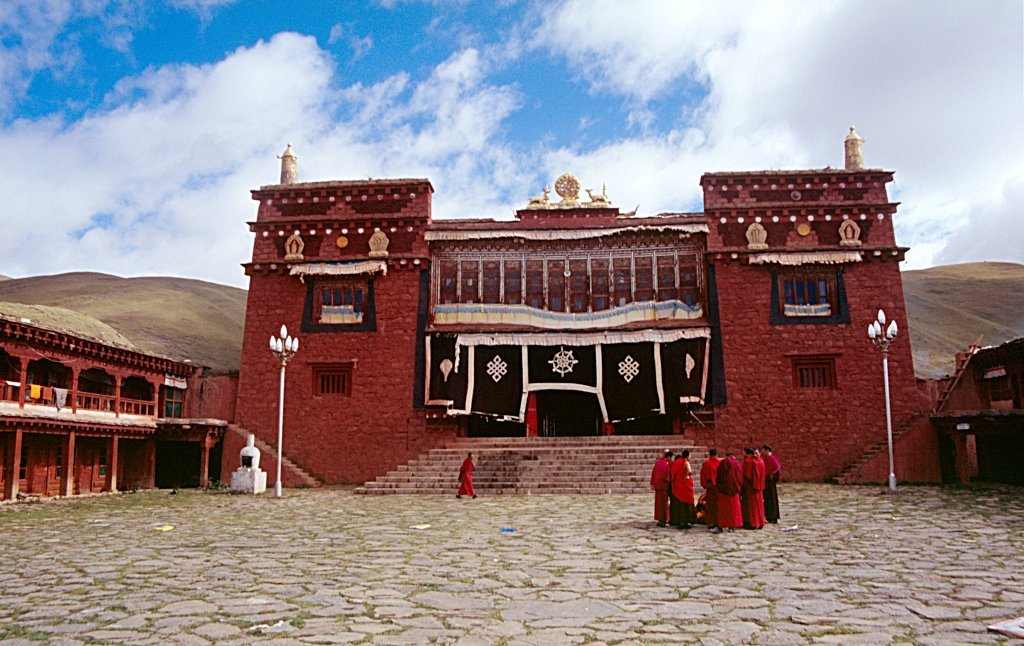
Litang Gompa in 2004

For practical purposes 'Gompa' in Tibetan Buddhist regions refers to a variety of religious buildings, (generally correlating to what might be described as a church) including small temple buildings and other places of worship or religious learning.
