= List of Monuments of National Importance in Ladakh =

This is a list of Monuments of National Importance (ASI) as officially recognized by and available through the website of the Archaeological Survey of India in the Indian union territory of Ladakh. The monument identifier is a combination of the abbreviation of the subdivision of the list (state, ASI circle) and the numbering as published on the website of the ASI. 15 Monuments of National Importance have been recognized by the ASI in Ladakh.

== Alphabetical list of monuments ==
SL. No.	Description	Location	Address	District	Coordinates	Image
N-LA-1	Rock cut Four Armed Bodhisatva	Mulbekh		Kargil	34°22′43″N 76°22′00″E	Rock cut Four Armed Bodhisatva More images
N-LA-2	Sculpture at Drass	Drass		Kargil	34°25′45″N 75°45′46″E	Sculpture at Drass More images
N-LA-3	Buddhist Monastery	Lamayuru		Leh	34°16′59″N 76°46′27″E	Buddhist Monastery More images
N-LA-4	Likir Monastery	Likir		Leh	34°17′35″N 77°12′54″E	Likir Monastery More images
N-LA-5	Alchi Monastery	Alchi		Leh	34°13′25″N 77°10′31″E	Alchi Monastery More images
N-LA-6	Phyang Monastery	Phyang		Leh	34°11′11″N 77°29′23″E	Phyang Monastery More images
	Ancient Palace at Leh	Leh		Leh	34°09′58″N 77°35′14″E	Ancient Palace at Leh More images
N-LA-8	Old Castle (Tsemo Hill)	Leh		Leh	34°10′03″N 77°35′25″E	Old Castle (Tsemo Hill) More images
N-LA-9	Stupa Tiserru	Shestang		Leh	34°10′54″N 77°35′03″E	Stupa Tiserru More images
N-LA-10	Ancient Palace including Shrine	Shey		Leh	34°04′18″N 77°37′58″E	Ancient Palace including Shrine More images
N-LA-11	Hamis Gompa	Hemis		Leh	33°54′45″N 77°42′10″E	Hamis Gompa More images
N-LA-12	Ancient Gumpha	Thiksey		Leh	34°03′21″N 77°40′04″E	Ancient Gumpha More images
N-LA-13	Shrine of four Lords Gon-Khang (Tsemo Hill)	Leh		Leh	34°10′02″N 77°35′26″E	Shrine of four Lords Gon-Khang (Tsemo Hill) More images
N-LA-14	Ancient Gonpa Complex	Wanla		Leh	34°14′58″N 76°49′52″E	Ancient Gonpa Complex More images
N-LA-15	Rangdum Monastery (Shadup Dzamlinggyan)	Rangdum		Kargil	34°02′12″N 76°22′22″E	Rangdum Monastery (Shadup Dzamlinggyan) More images

== See also ==
- List of Monuments of National Importance in India for other Monuments of National Importance in India
