= List of Monuments of National Importance in Tripura =

This is a list of Monuments of National Importance (ASI) as officially recognized by and available through the website of the Archaeological Survey of India in the Indian state Tripura. The monument identifier is a combination of the abbreviation of the subdivision of the list (state, ASI circle) and the numbering as published on the website of the ASI. 8 Monuments of National Importance have been recognized by the ASI in Tripura.

== List of monuments of national importance ==
SL. No.	Description	Location	Address	District	Coordinates	Image
N-TR-1	Sculptures and rock reliefs of Unakoti Tirtha, Unakoti Range,	Unakoti Range		North Tripura	24°19′01″N 92°04′01″E	Sculptures and rock reliefs of Unakoti Tirtha, Unakoti Range, More images
N-TR-2	Ancient Remains, Boxanagar	Boxanagar		West Tripura	23°36′59″N 91°09′59″E	Ancient Remains, Boxanagar More images
N-TR-3	Gunavati Group of Temples, Radha Kishorpur	Radha Kishorpur		South Tripura	23°32′17″N 91°30′10″E	Upload Photo
N-TR-4	Temple of Chaturdasa Devata, Radha Kishorpur	Kishorpur		South Tripura	23°32′24″N 91°29′59″E	Upload Photo
N-TR-5	Bhubaneswari Temple, Rajnagar	Rajnagar		South Tripura	23°32′30″N 91°30′15″E	Bhubaneswari Temple, Rajnagar More images
N-TR-6	Thakurani Tilla, Paschim Pillak	Pillak		South Tripura	23°12′13″N 91°35′30″E	Upload Photo
N-TR-7	Ancient Mound called Shyamsundar Ashram Tilla, Baikhora Jolaibari	Baikhora Jolaibari		South Tripura	23°12′23″N 91°36′14″E	Ancient Mound called Shyamsundar Ashram Tilla, Baikhora Jolaibari More images
N-TR-8	Ancient Mound known as Puja Khola, Paschim Pillak	Paschim Pillak		South Tripura	23°12′13″N 91°35′44″E	Upload Photo

== See also ==
- List of Monuments of National Importance in India
- List of State Protected Monuments in Tripura
