= Mohajmata Temple =

Coordinates: 25°02′44″N 77°56′57″E

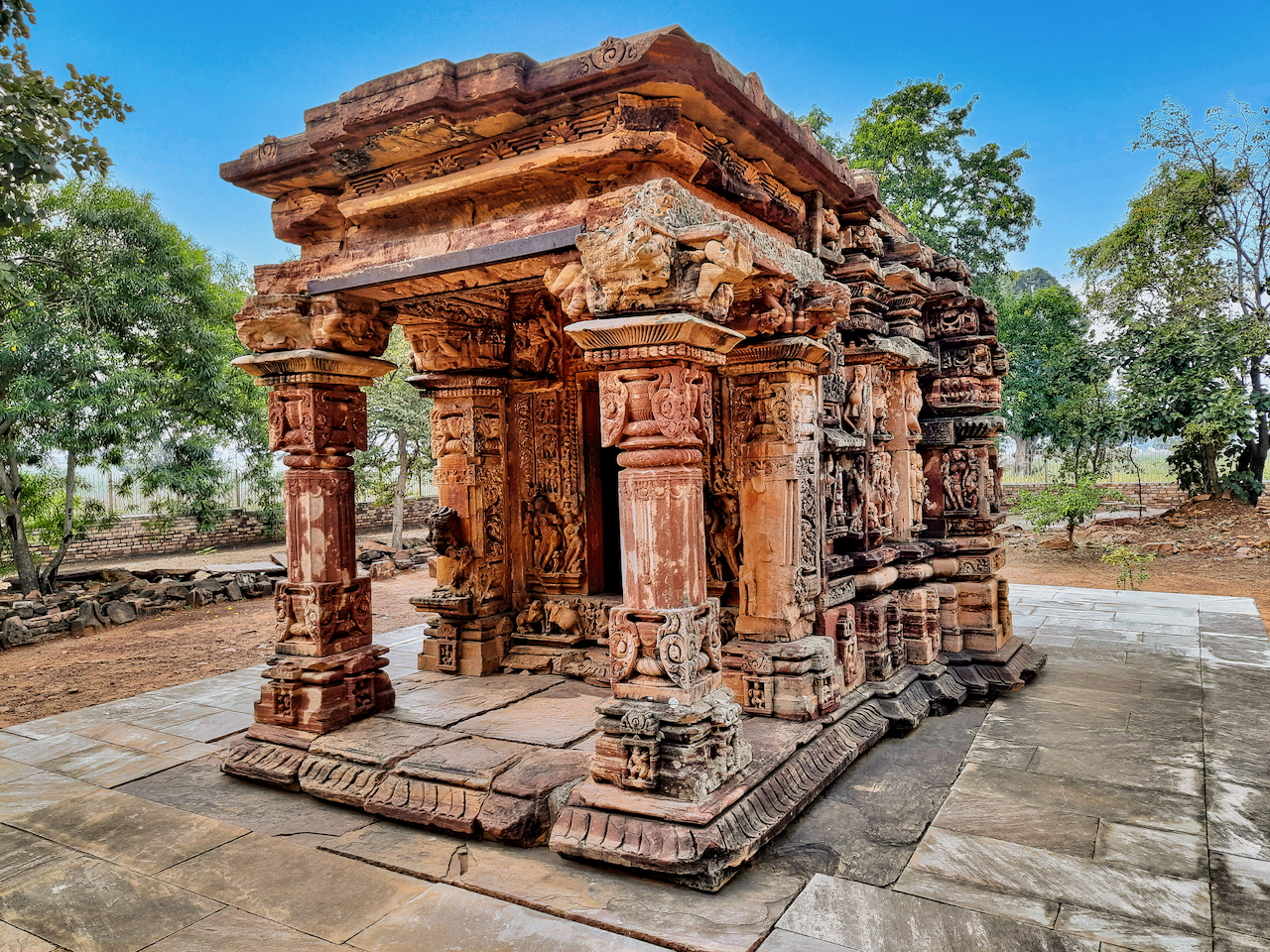

Religion
- Affiliation: Hinduism
- Interactive map of Mohajmata Temple
- Monument of National Importance
- Reference no.: N-MP-263

Mohajmata Temple is a temple in Madhya Pradesh, India.

The temple is dedicated to a goddess named Mohajmata. This is probably Kali. It is listed as a monument of national importance.

== History ==
It was conserved by the archaeological department of the Gwalior State in the 1930s.

== Description ==
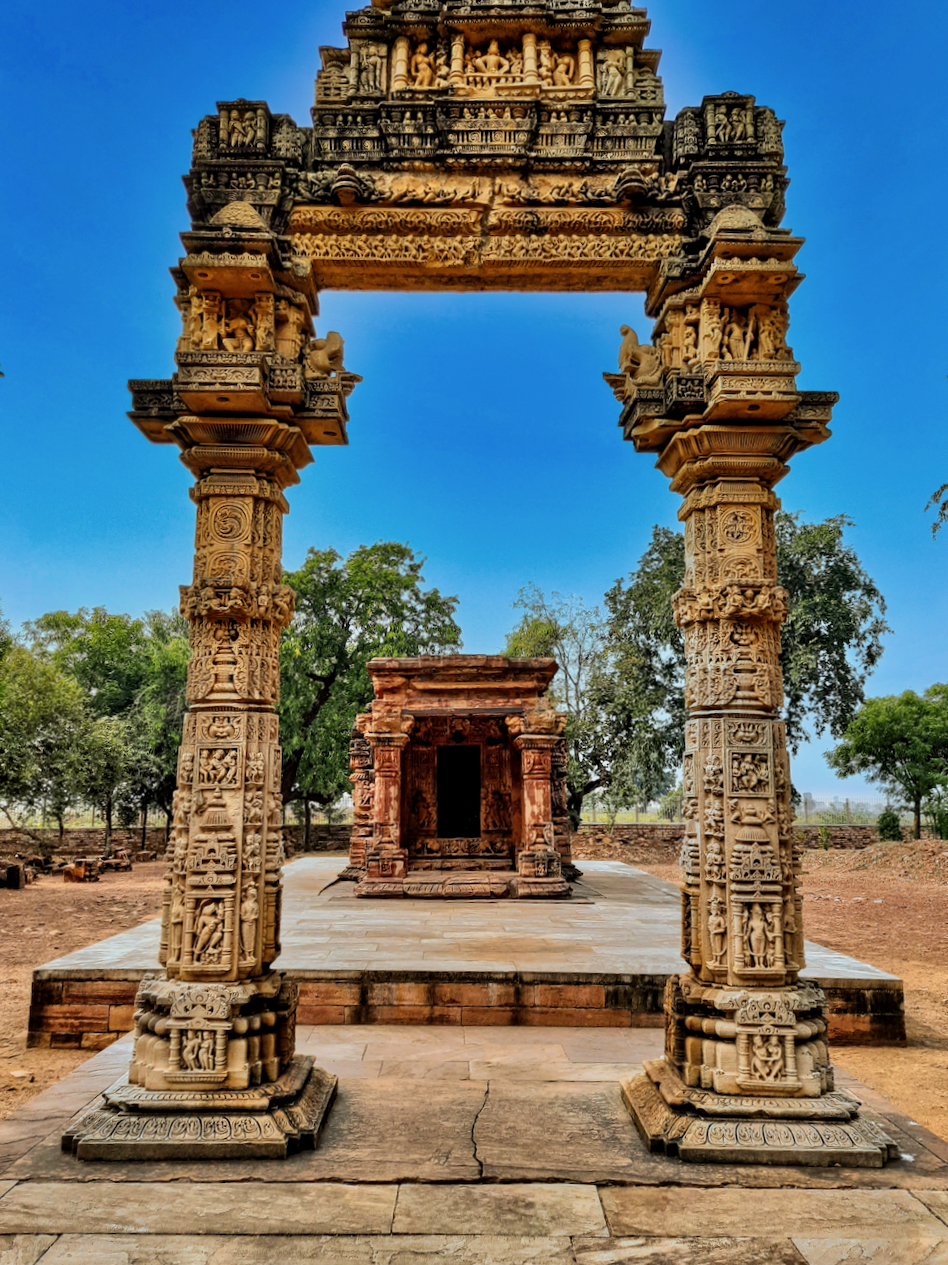
The torana with the temple in the background.

The temple has a quadrangular shape, with a length of 15 feet 6 inches, and a breadth of 12 feet 3 inches. The temple consists of a sanctum and a porch, with its walls decorated with carved figures of goblins.

A well-preserved torana stands in front of the temple, at a distance of 18 feet. The torana is 20 feet high.
