= Shahzadi Ka Roza =

Coordinates: 24.7198°N 78.1335°E

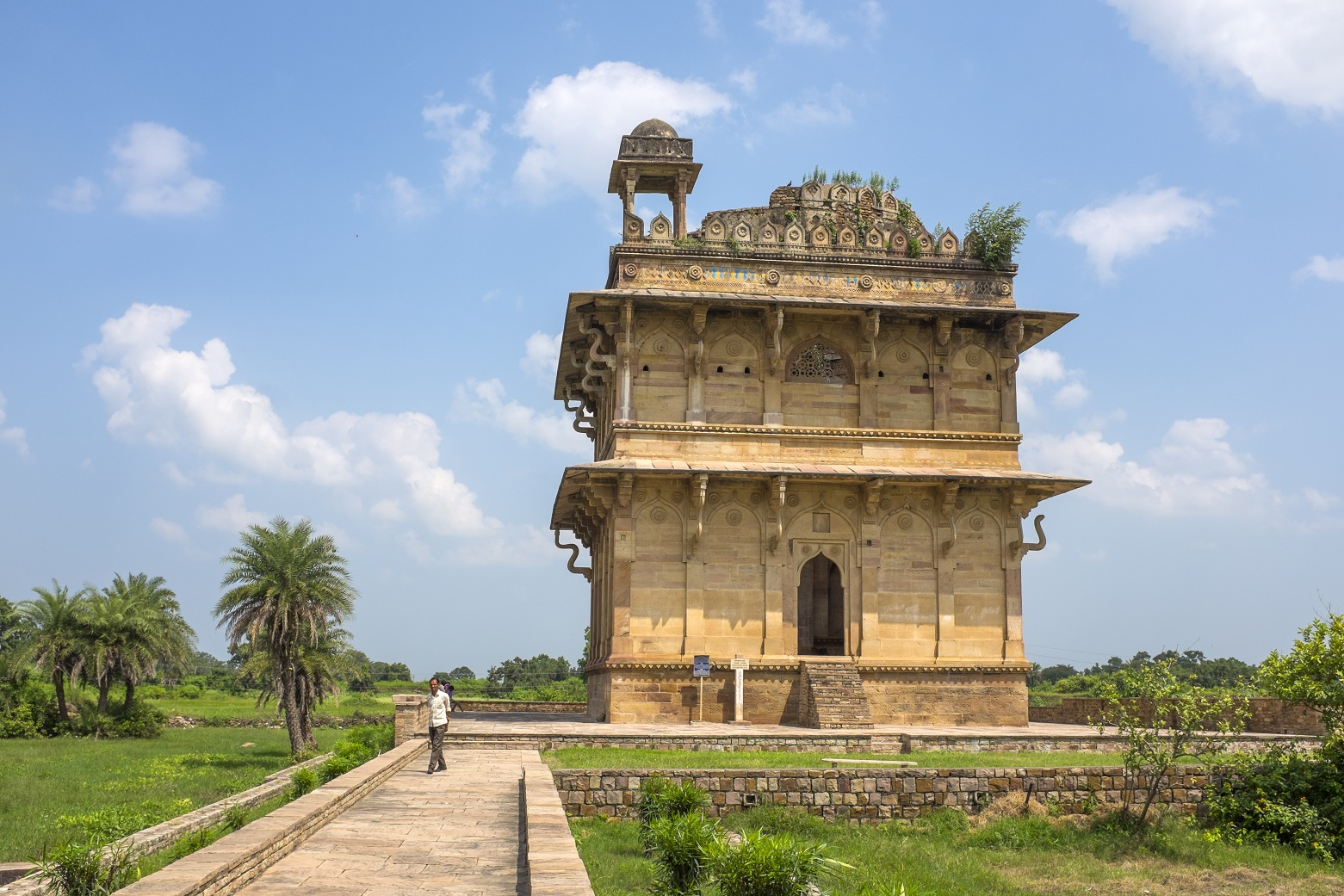

Monument of National Importance
- Official name: Shahzadi Ka Roza
- Reference no.: N-MP-131

Shahzadi Ka Rauza, or Shahzadi Ka Roza (literally "princess' tomb") is a tomb located in Chanderi, in the Indian state of Madhya Pradesh. It is listed as a monument of national importance.
