= List of Monuments of National Importance in Dadra and Nagar Haveli and Daman and Diu =

This is a list of Monuments of National Importance (ASI) as officially recognized by and available through the website of the Archaeological Survey of India in the Indian union territory Dadra and Nagar Haveli and Daman and Diu. The monument identifier is a combination of the abbreviation of the subdivision of the list (state, ASI circle) and the numbering as published on the website of the ASI. 11 Monuments of National Importance have been recognized by the ASI in Dadra and Nagar Haveli and Daman and Diu.

== List of monuments of national importance ==
SL. No.	Description	Location	Address	District	Coordinates	Image
N-DD-1	Bangli	Diu		Diu	20°42′29″N 70°57′23″E	Bangli More images
N-DD-2	Tower of Silence	Diu		Diu	20°42′27″N 70°57′21″E	Tower of Silence More images
N-DD-3	Diu Fort together with the inside building	Diu	Fort Walls	Diu	20°42′53″N 70°59′46″E	Diu Fort together with the inside building More images
N-DD-4	Old Mosque (Jama Masjid)	Diu	Inside the Fort, Diu	Diu	20°43′05″N 70°59′06″E	Upload Photo
N-DD-5	St. Paul’s Church	Diu	Outside the fort	Diu	20°42′53″N 70°59′26″E	St. Paul’s Church More images
N-DD-6	Fort Walls (Including Gates, Structures, Moat, Open land, Outside & Inside Fort)	Daman	Along sea shore outside western corner of Moti Daman fort	Moti Daman	20°24′28″N 72°50′00″E	Fort Walls (Including Gates, Structures, Moat, Open land, Outside & Inside Fort) More images
N-DD-7	Church of Holy Jesus	Daman	Near Northwestern corner of the fort area	Moti Daman	20°24′24″N 72°50′03″E	Church of Holy Jesus More images
N-DD-8	Ruined Church	Daman	Near northwestern corner of the fort walls	Moti Daman	20°24′28″N 72°49′51″E	Ruined Church More images
N-DD-9	The Chapel of Our Lady of Rosario	Daman	Insides the fort	Moti Daman	20°24′21″N 72°50′02″E	Upload Photo
N-DD-10	The Church of Our Lady of Remedios	Daman	Outside Darjiwada	Moti Daman	20°24′10″N 72°49′56″E	The Church of Our Lady of Remedios More images
N-DD-11	Fort Walls	Daman	On Sea-shore outside of western corner of Moti Daman Fort	Nani Daman	20°24′48″N 72°49′56″E	Upload Photo

== See also ==
- List of Monuments of National Importance in India for other Monuments of National Importance in India
