= List of Water Heritage Sites in India =

The Ministry of Jal Shakti of the Government of India has declared 75 sites in India as the Water Heritage Sites. These sites are more than hundred years old and of historical importance.

== History ==
On occasion of 75 years of the Independence of India, the Ministry of Jal Shakti constituted a committee to identify the heritage water sites. Total 421 nominations were received from the states, union territories, central government agencies and people. Total 75 sites were selected and presented on its website on 5 January 2023 during the 1st All India State Ministers Conference on Water at Bhopal, Madhya Pradesh.

== List of Water Heritage Sites in India ==
Sr No	Heritage Name	State	District	Type	Year
1	Panighat Aqueduct	Andaman and Nicobar	South Andamans	Dam	Built during British period
2	K. C. Canal Aqueduct across Handri River	Andhra Pradesh	Kurnool	Others	19th century
3	Sir Arthur Cotton Barrage (Dowleshwaram Anicut)	Andhra Pradesh	East Godavari	Dam	1852
4	Porumamilla Tank (Anantharaja Sagaram)	Andhra Pradesh	Kadapa	Tank	1369
5	Cumbum Tank	Andhra Pradesh	Prakasam	Tank	1522-1524
6	Bor Pukhuri or Sivasagar Tank	Assam	Sivasagar	Tank	1734
7	Jaysagar Pukhuri	Assam	Sivasagar	Tank	1697
8	Gaurisagar Pukhuri	Assam	Sivasagar	Tank	1714-1744
9	Lakshimpur Pukhuri	Assam	Darrang	Tank	17th Century
10	Sher Shah Suri Pond	Bihar	Rohtas	Artificial lake	1538
11	Agam Kuan (Dugwell)	Bihar	Patna	Well	273 BC
12	Sita Bari (Dug Well)	Chhattisgarh	Gariaband	Well	2nd century BC
13	Agrasen Ki Baoli	Delhi	New Delhi	Stepwell	14th Century
14	Sudarshan Talav	Gujarat	Junagadh	Artificial lake	circa 150
15	Rani ki Vav	Gujarat	Patan	Stepwell	11th-century
16	Lothal Docks	Gujarat	Ahmadabad	Others	circa 2000 BC
17	Hamirsar Lake	Gujarat	Kutch	Artificial lake	Between 1548 and 1585
18	Ahmedabad System of Lakes	Gujarat	Ahmedabad	Artificial lake	1451
19	Bhagsu Nag Temple Waterbody	Himachal Pradesh	Kangra	Tank	circa 1850
20	Surajkund	Haryana	Faridabad	Stepwell	10th century
21	Western Yamuna Canal	Haryana	Yamunanagar	Others	1335, 1640, 1817
22	Solah Rahi	Haryana	Rewari	Tank	1650
23	Topchanchi Lake	Jharkhand	Dhanbad	Artificial lake	1915-1924
24	Ancient Temple Laduv / Ladhoo (Sanyasar Nag)	Jammu and Kashmir	Pulwama	Others	8th century
25	Stepwell At Durga Temple Complex Aihole	Karnataka	Bagalkot	Stepwell	6th–12th century
26	The Cascading Tank Ecosystem Of Karnataka: Cholanakunte / Suddakunte	Karnataka	Kolar	Tank	1150
27	New Madaga Tank	Karnataka	Chikkamagaluru	Tank	500 years old, built during Vijayanagara dynasty
28	Vijayanagar Canal System	Karnataka	Ballari	Dam	1600
29	First Piped Water Supply System For Bengaluru Hesaraghatta Lake, Syphon, Brick Aqueduct And Pumping Stations	Karnataka	Bengaluru Urban	Tank	1894
30	Kerala Waterways	Kerala	Ernakulam	Others	19th century onwards
31	Peralassery Subramania Temple	Kerala	Kannur	Stepwell	
32	Karzu Zing (Pond)	Ladakh	Leh	Artificial lake	1909
33	Raigad Fort	Maharashtra	Raigad	Tank	1030 and additions in 17th Century
34	Dhamapur Lake	Maharashtra	Sindhudurg	Artificial lake	1530
35	Baramotichi Vihir	Maharashtra	Satara	Stepwell	1646
36	Nehers Of Aurangabad - Neher-e-ambari and Neher-e-panchakki	Maharashtra	Aurangabad	Others	Neher-e-Ambari - 1612, Neher-e-Panchakki - 1695
37	Bamboo Drip Irrigation	Meghalaya	West Jaintia Hills	Water system	Not Available (a century old)
38	Kangla Moats	Manipur	Imphal West	Others	1652-1666
39	Tank System of Bundelkhand	Madhya Pradesh	Chhattarpur, Mahoba, Panna	Tank	Since early medieval period
40	Mandu (Malwa Plateau) System Of Water Collection in over 1200 tanks supporting the city	Madhya Pradesh	Dhar	Tank	15th century
41	Khooni Bhandara	Madhya Pradesh	Burhanpur	Tank	1615
42	Chandeva Ki Bawadi	Madhya Pradesh	Datia	Stepwell	1618
43	Mahal Gulara	Madhya Pradesh	Burhanpur	Dam	1627-1658
44	Upper Lake	Madhya Pradesh	Bhopal	Artificial lake	1005–1055
45	Saptui Water Point	Mizoram	Lunglei	Water system	1903
46	Rushikulya Irrigation System Including Russelkonda Reservoir, Sorada Reservoir, Janivilli Anicut & Madhabarida Anicut (Ghumusar Anicut)	Odisha	Ganjam	Water system	R.R: 1894, S.R: 1896, J.A: 1891 and M.A: 1891
47	Baitarani Irrigation Project	Odisha	Jajpur / Bhadrak	Water system	From 1871 to 1878
48	Aam Khas Bagh (Daulat Khana-i-khas)	Punjab	Fatehgarh Sahib	Water system	1634
49	Bahour Irrgigation Tank	Pondicherry	Puducherry	Tank	10th Century
50	Ajmer Lake/ Ana Sagar Lake	Rajasthan	Ajmer	Artificial lake	1135-1150
51	Rajsamand Lake and Dam	Rajasthan	Rajsamand	Artificial lake	1676
52	Udaipur Lake System	Rajasthan	Udaipur	Artificial lake	1382-1887
53	Toorji Ki Bawari	Rajasthan	Jodhpur	Stepwell	1740
54	Chand Baori	Rajasthan	Dausa	Stepwell	9th century
55	Gadisar Lake System	Rajasthan	Jaisalmer	Artificial lake	1367
56	Kaylana Lake and Takhat Sagar Lake	Rajasthan	Jodhpur	Artificial lake	1872
57	Lower Anicut	Tamil Nadu	Thanjavur	Dam	1827-1836
58	Vandiyur Mariamman Teppakulam	Tamil Nadu	Madurai	Tank	1635
59	Buckingham Canal (Kommamur Canal)	Tamil Nadu	Chennai	Others	1806/1837/1877-78
60	Grand Anicut on the Kaveri	Tamil Nadu	Thanjavur	Dam	100 BC-100 (2000 years old)
61	Noyyal River System Tanks	Tamil Nadu	Coimbatore	Tank	Unknown
62	Veeranam Tank	Tamil Nadu	Cuddalore	Tank	9th century
63	Kalingarayan Anicut	Tamil Nadu	Erode	Dam	740 years old
64	Kamalasagar Dighi with Temple	Tripura	Sipahijala	Artificial lake	14th century
65	Hussain Sagar Lake (Tank Bund)	Telangana	Hyderabad	Artificial lake	1563
66	Sadarmatt Anicut	Telangana	Nirmal	Water system	1891-92
67	Golconda Fort Water systems	Telangana	Hyderabad	Tank	11th century onwards
68	Kakatiya Interconnected Tank System	Telangana	Hyderabad	Tank	
69	Solani Aqueduct	Uttarakhand	Haridwar	Others	1846-1856
70	Naula or Covered Spring Attached To Temples	Uttarakhand	Pithoragarh	Water system	circa 10th century
71	Shukla Talab	Uttar Pradesh	Kanpur Dehat	Artificial lake	1578
72	Barua Sagar	Uttar Pradesh	Jhansi	Artificial lake	1694
73	Nadrai Pul	Uttar Pradesh	Kasganj	Others	1889
74	Sringaverapura	Uttar Pradesh	Prayagraj	Tank	1st century BCE
75	Midnapore Anicut	West Bengal	Paschim Medinipur	Dam	1871

== See also ==
- National Geological Monuments of India
- Monuments of National Importance of India
- State Protected Monuments of India
- List of World Heritage Sites in India
- List of columnar jointed volcanics in India
- Menhirs in India
- List of rock-cut temples in India
- List of forts in India
- List of museums in India
