= Naulas =

Natural water bodies found in the Himalayan region

Naulas or Baori are natural water bodies found in the Himalayan region and are constructed in a place where water is tapped from underground leakage or natural springs to meet the water requirements of local communities for household consumption.

== Etymology ==
Naula is a waterbody found on the Himalayan regions of Kumaon, it is also known as Baori in Himachal Pradesh. These are built on the surroundings of a dhara (a natural spring) which appears depending on the water flows in lower levels of surface, by digging a pit and to store the water and protecting it by construction of stone walls around it. These are said to be originated more than 1000 years back and the last one was said to be constructed around 75 years back.

== Existence ==
Naulas or Baoris are basically found in Himalayan regions of India. Naulas or Baoris are a major source of drinking water for people living in the hilly areas of Himachal Pradesh and Uttarakhand.

== Architecture ==
Naulas or Baoris have the roof and walls built with local stones but the surface is covered with small stone pieces or left natural for water filtration. The number of steps in Naula are usually in odd numbers of 3,5,7 and likewise. Four sides roof of a Naula is designed to look like a temple and many of them have representations and designs of different deities in the form of gods and goddesses or lights to guide the thirsty passer-by. Households not having a temple at home visit Naula to offer their prayers and light an oil lamp and submit their offerings.

== Challenges ==
Existence of Naulas have been facing challenges of due to ecological damages resulting from pollution, deforestation etc.

== See also ==
- Lakes
- List of Water Heritage Sites in India
