= Boxanagar Ruins =

Archaeological site in Boxanagar, Tripura

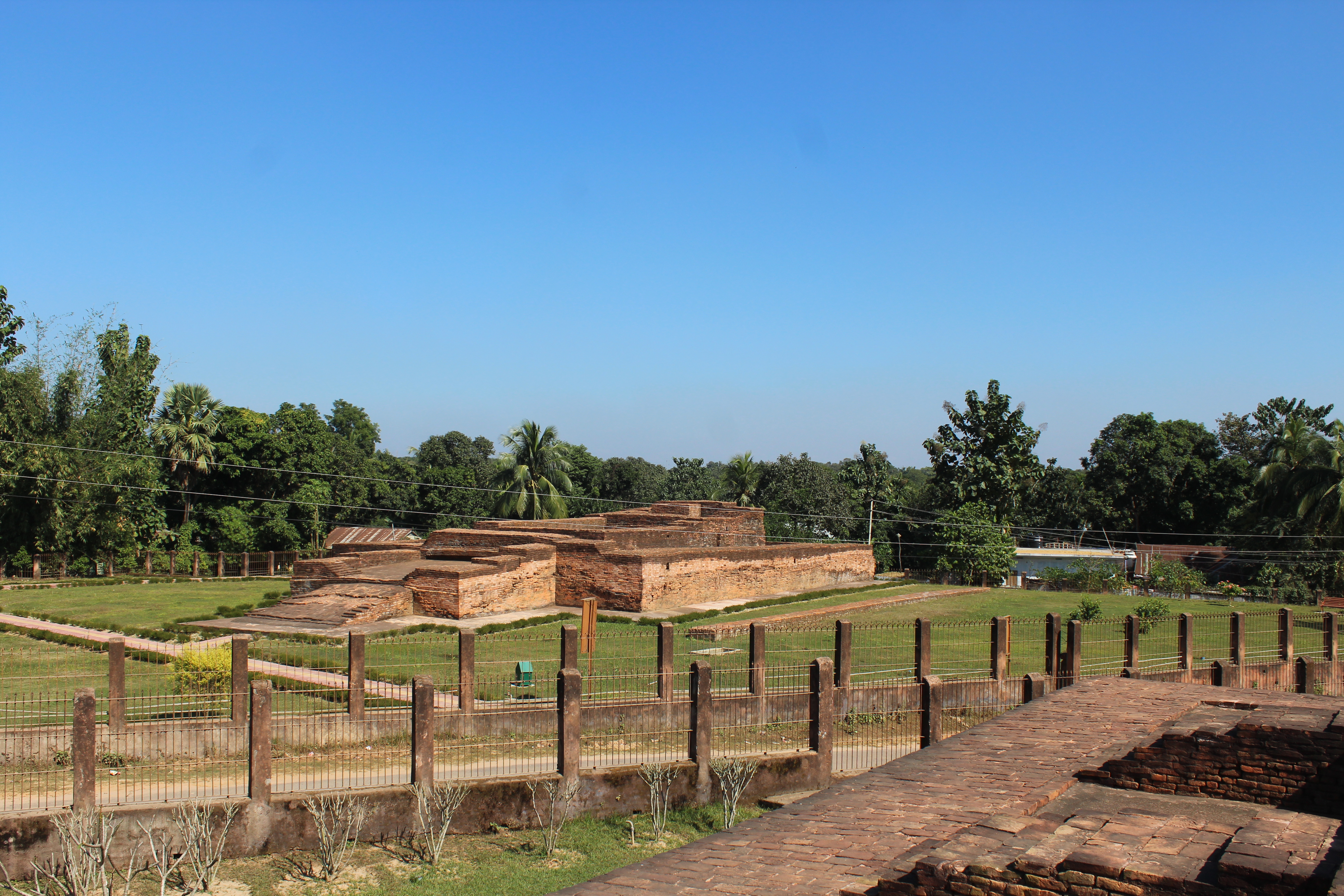
- Ruins at Boxanagar

- Boxanagar Ruins Boxanagar Ruins (Tripura) Boxanagar Ruins (South Asia)
- 23°36′58.9″N 91°09′56.3″E
- Type: Stupa, chaityagṛha, monastery
- Location: Boxanagar, Sonamura subdivision, Sipahijala district, Tripura, India

History
- Built: Between 6th and 9th centuries CE

Site notes
- Material: Burnt bricks, mud mortar, terracotta
- Architectural style: Buddhist
- Condition: Preserved
- Management: Archaeological Survey of India

Monument of National Importance
- Official name: Ancient Remains, Boxanagar
- Reference no.: N-TR-2
- State: Tripura

The Boxanagar Ruins are a Buddhist archaeological site in Boxanagar, Tripura, India. It is designated a Monument of National Importance by the Archaeological Survey of India.

== Location ==
The Boxanagar archaeological site is located at Boxanagar, a village in northwest Sonamura subdivision, Sipahijala district in western Tripura. Boxanagar has an average elevation of 21 m (69 ft). The ruins are situated on the fringes of the Indo-Bangladesh border, and sit at a distance of approximately 40 km (25 mi) from Agartala, the state's capital. The nearest airport is Maharaja Bir Bikram Airport and the nearest railway station is Agartala railway station in Agartala.

== History ==
The Boxanagar Ruins, a largely Buddhist complex, are believed by archaeologists to be Tripura's most ancient Buddhist archaeological site. According to them, the Buddhist civilization of Boxanagar first emerged during the Khadga dynasty, a Buddhist dynasty which ruled the areas of Vanga and Samatata in ancient Bengal from 625 CE to 716 CE. Historians believe that Buddhist culture and influence flourished in Boxanagar between the 6th (7th according to some accounts) and 12th centuries CE, a period marked by rich history, learning, and the arts.

The Boxanagar archaeological site is believed by archaeologists to have been erected sometime between the 6th and 9th centuries CE. Some historians consider the discoveries in Boxanagar to be an indication of the peaceful coexistence of Hindu-Buddhist culture.

The excavation history of the Boxanagar Ruins dates back to 2002 when a local landowner, in the process of digging a section of his ancestral plot, encountered a cluster of burnt bricks. Following up on the discovery, the Archaeological Survey of India (ASI) officially commenced excavation about a year later, in 2003. (Note: The exact year or date official archaeological excavation commenced at Boxanagar is uncertain; different sources give varying possible years, with some suggesting start dates as early as the 1990s.) The excavation was conducted in a number of phases; as of January 2026, it remains partially incomplete.

== Description ==
The excavation in Boxanagar unearthed a large brick stupa, a chaityagṛha (prayer hall), a monastery, votive stupas, and other burnt-brick structures and substructures. Upon discovery, locals initially ascribed the findings to an ancient temple dedicated to Manasa Devi, the Hindu goddess of snakes. However, the Buddhist buildings and the eventual discovery of three sculptures of the Buddha indicate the ruins had been a Buddhist religious site.

The Boxanagar Ruins span an area of approximately 3 acres (1.21 ha), and are situated on a raised portion of land. The brick stupa, the fundamental element of the site, is square-shaped and measures 237.16 m2 (2,553 sq ft). During the excavation, the harmika, a fence-like Buddhist architectural structure believed to have been set atop the stupa, was discovered collapsed. Within the stupa were found a number of smaller clay votive stupas and sealings with inscriptions in the Kutlia script. At the basement of the stupa lie eight mouldings, arranged in descending order.

To the east of the stupa lies the chaityagṛha, a traditional Buddhist prayer hall. It is rectangular in shape and measures 18.50 m × 11.90 m. The chaityagṛha is almost completely damaged; only the side walls remain. To the right of the chaityagṛha lies the monastery, which is also rectangular-shaped, and measures 31.80 × 17.80 m. It comprises a central corridor and ten cells. Archaeological analysis reveals that the monastery was constructed in three stages. A number of seals dating to c. 6th century CE were found in the monastery, the inscriptions on which remain undeciphered.

Each of the stupa, the chaityagṛha, and the monastery is oriented east–west. In 2009-10, another mound was excavated in the area, revealing a burnt-brick structure with triratha projections and a square-shaped chamber. Apart from these, three bronze images of the Buddha, moulded bricks, and silver coins were unearthed during excavation.

== Gallery ==
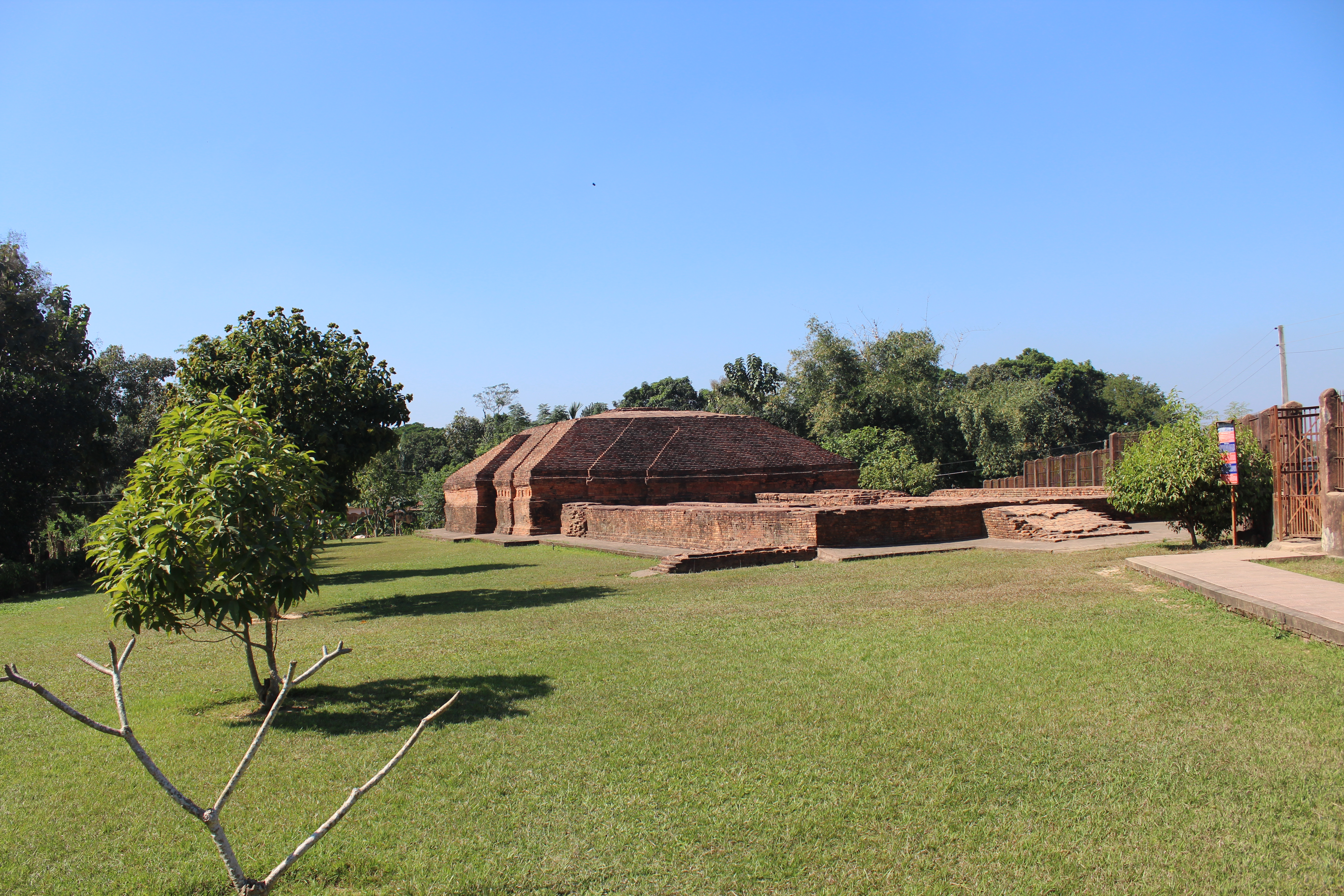
The brick stupa at Boxanagar (?)

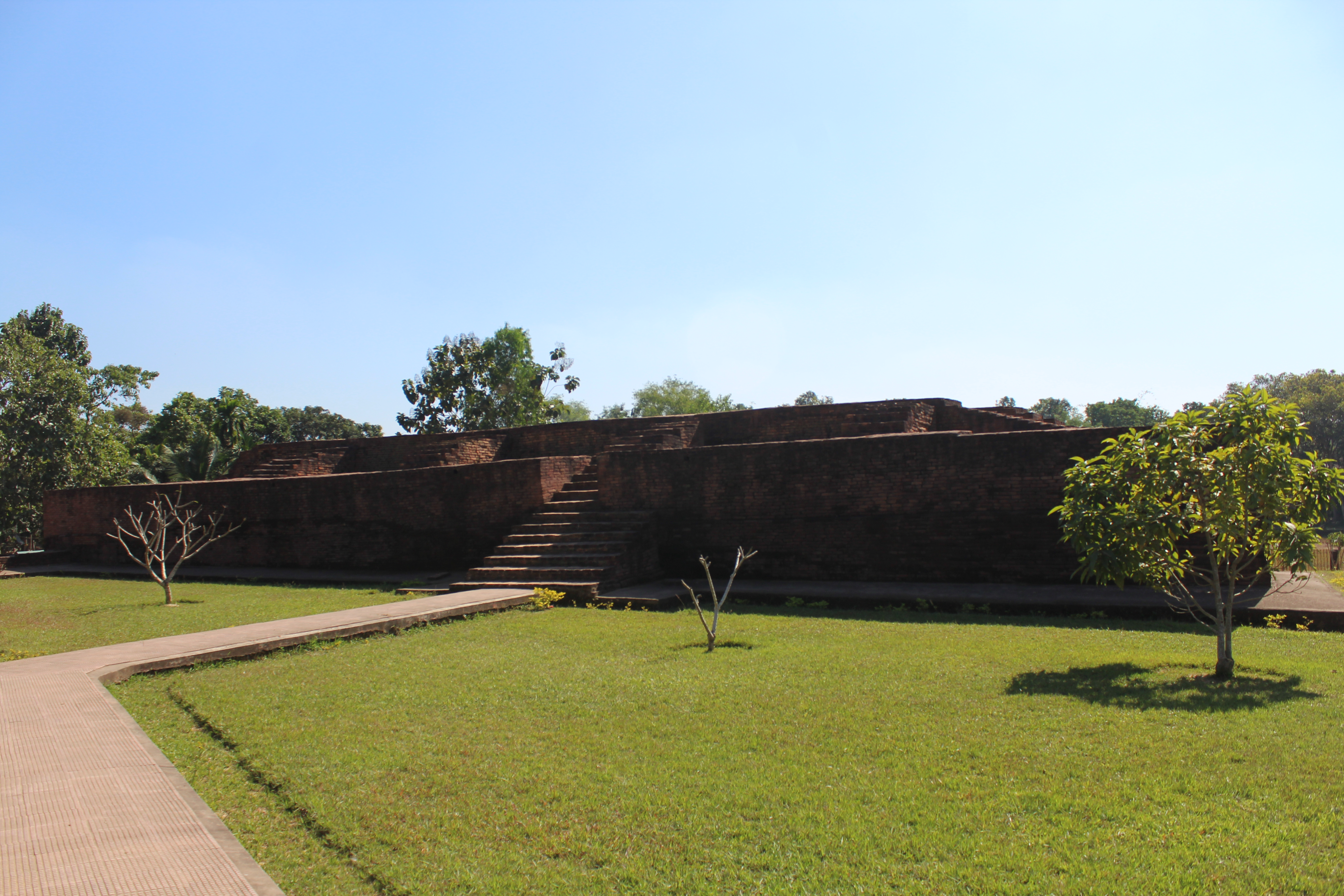
The monastery

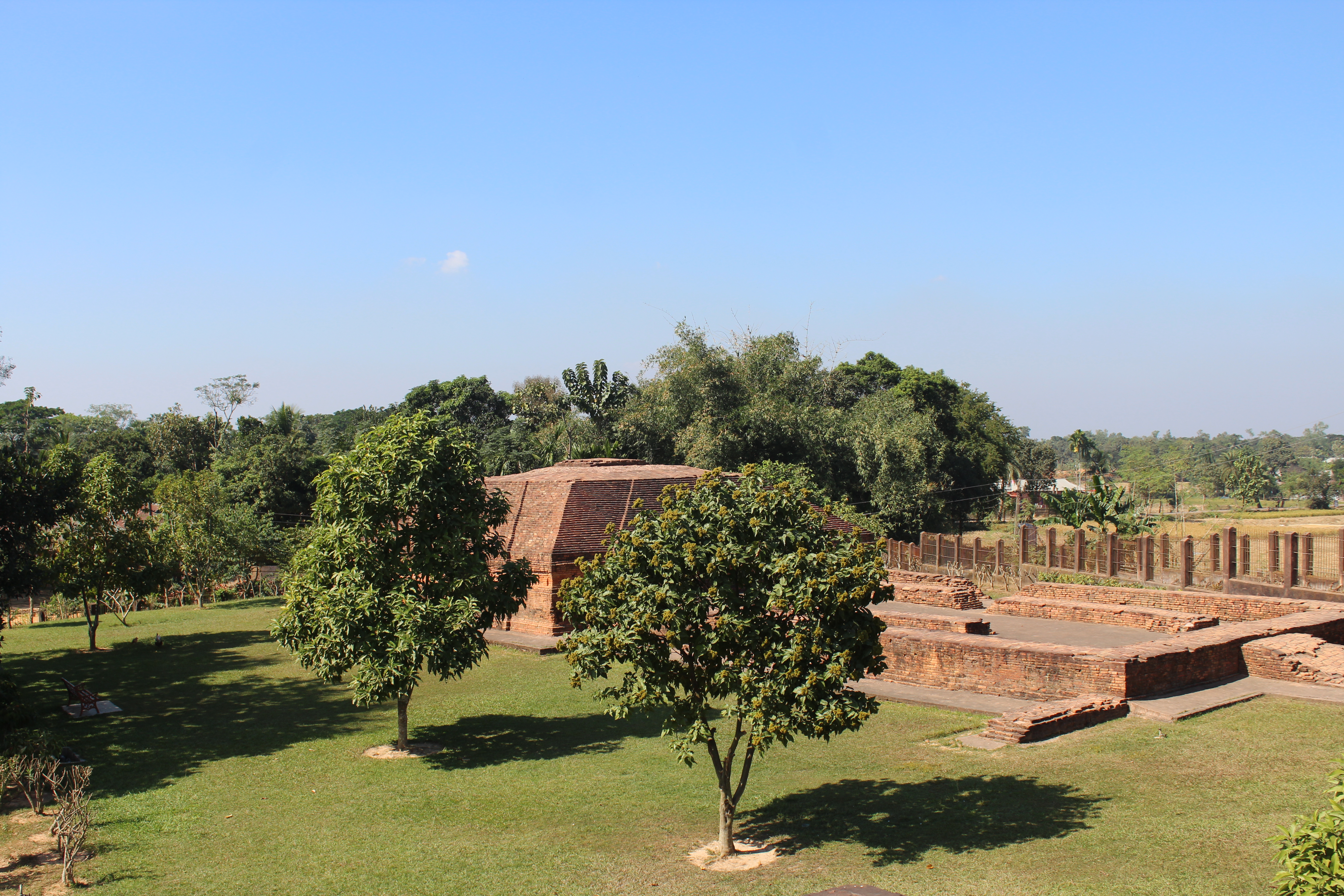
The chaityagṛha

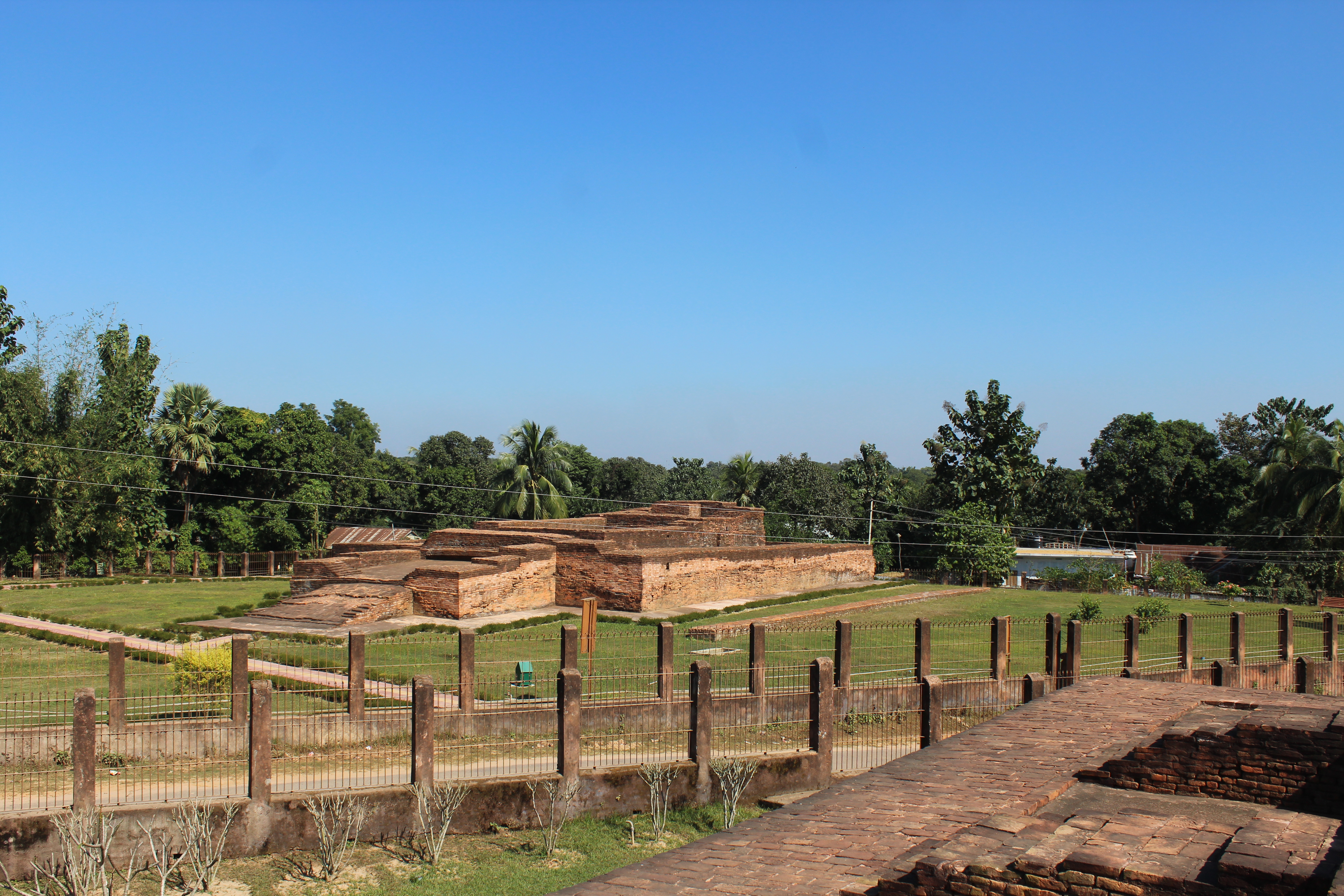
Boxanagar ruins

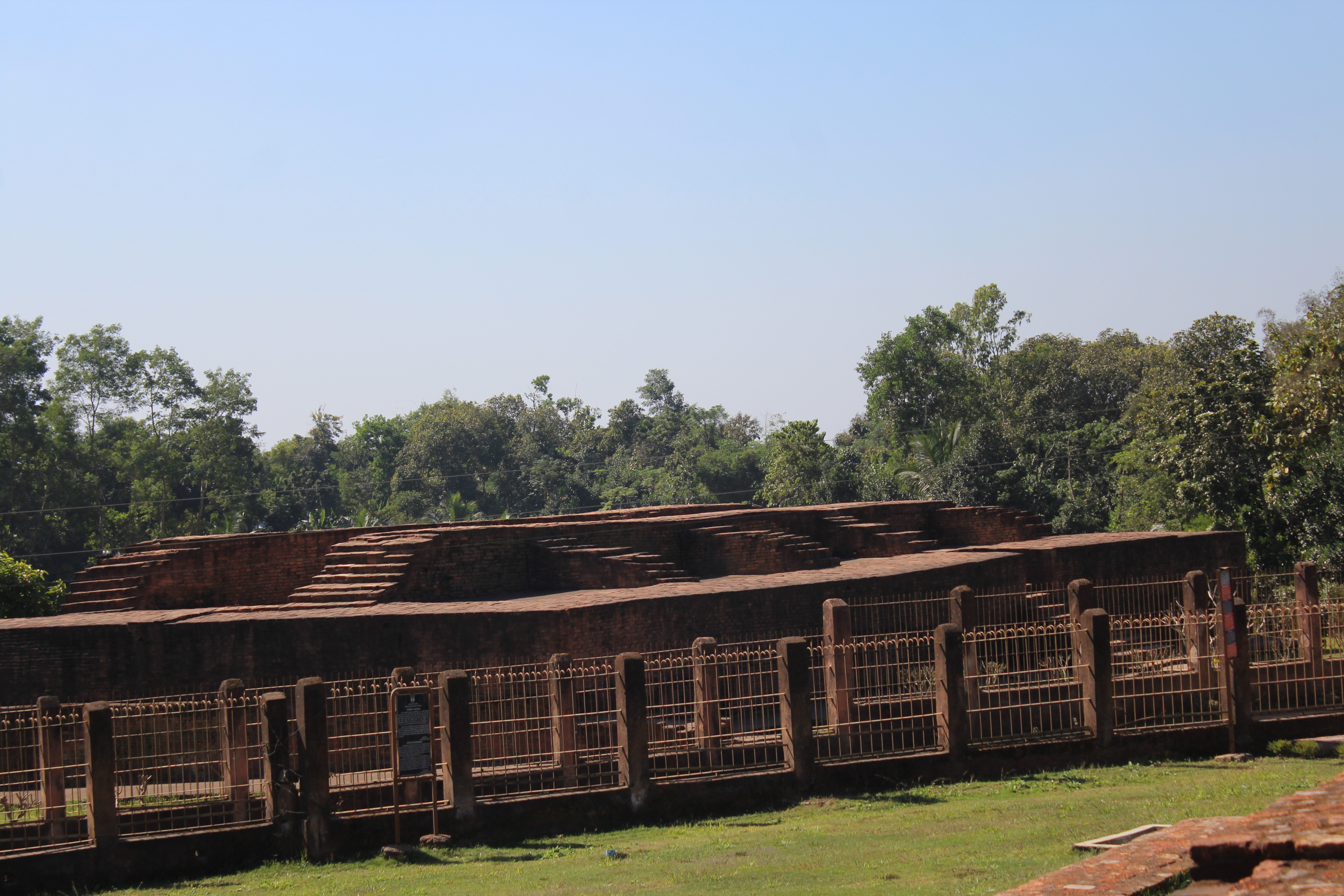
Boxanagar ruins

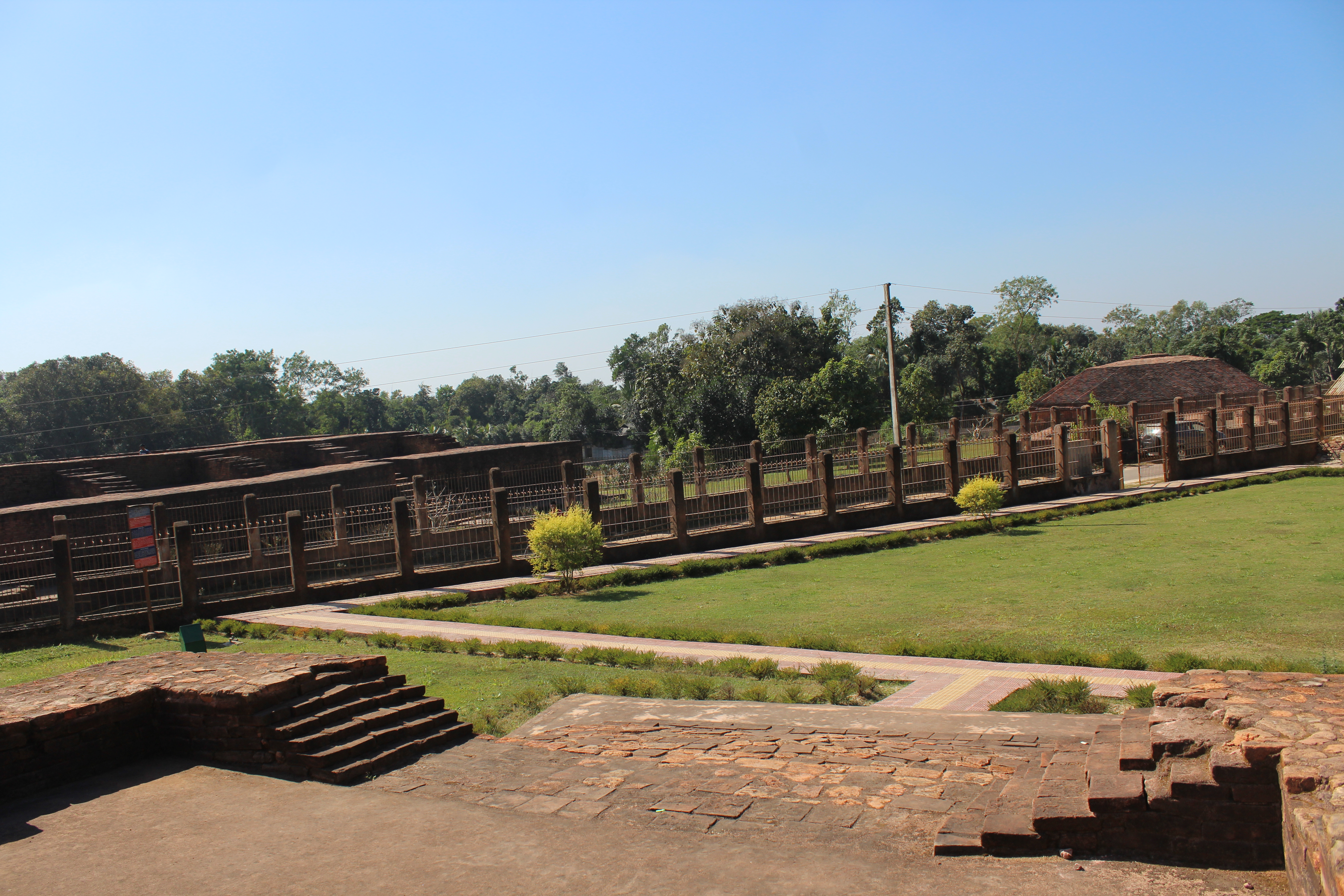
Boxanagar ruins
