= Lamayuru Monastery =

Tibetan Buddhist monastery in Lamayouro, Ladakh, India

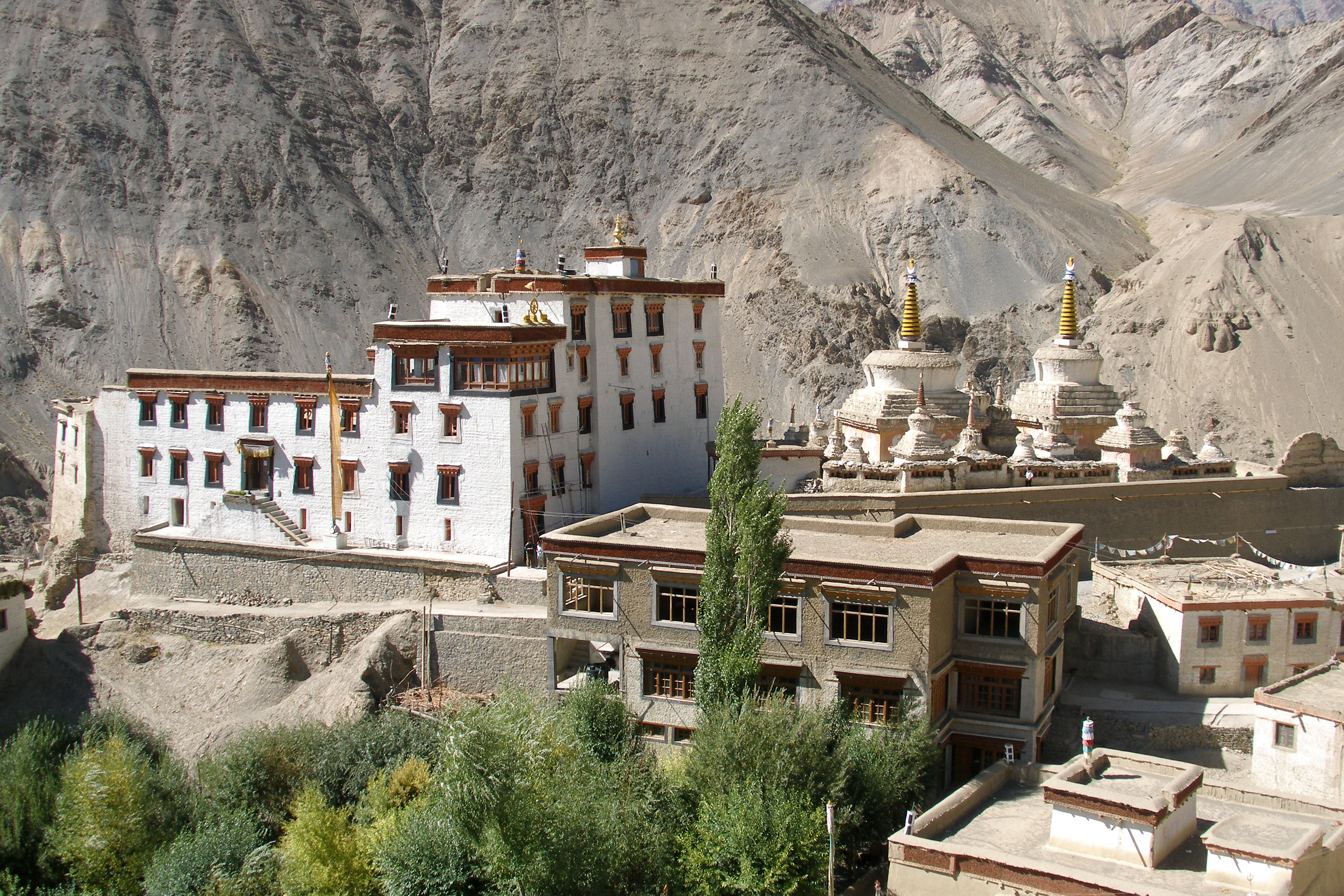
- Lamayuru Monastery

- Location within India

Religion
- Affiliation: Tibetan Buddhism
- Sect: Drikung Kagyu
- Festival: Annual masked dance festival

Location
- Location: Lamayouro, Leh district, Ladakh, India
- Interactive map of Lamayuru Monastery
- Coordinates: 34°16′58″N 76°46′28″E

Architecture
- Style: Gompa
- Founder: Naropa
- Established: 11th century

Lamayuru or Yuru Monastery (Tibetan: བླ་མ་གཡུང་དྲུང་དགོན་པ་, Wylie: bla ma gyung drung dgon pa "Eternal Monastery") is a Tibetan Buddhist monastery in Lamayouro village of Leh district in Ladakh in India. These natural caves were inhabited by monks for meditation, forming a cave monastery, particularly the famous "meditation cave of Naropa" (named after Naropa who was an Indian Buddhist Mahasiddha) preserved within the monastery's central hall. It is situated on the NH1 Srinagar-Leh Highway 15 kilometres (9.3 mi) east of the Fotu La at a height of 3,510 metres (11,520 ft) and 19 km southwest of Khalsi. The area is popular among tourists for its moonscape-like rocky appearance.

== History ==
According to popular tradition, it was originally the foremost Bon monastery in Ladakh; its name means swastika and is a popular symbol in Bon culture for "eternity". Yungdrung is the name of the most popular school of Bon. It is currently affiliated with the Drikung Kagyu school of Buddhism.

The Drikung history states that the Indian scholar Naropa (956-1041 CE) allegedly caused a lake which filled the valley to dry up and founded Lamayuru Monastery. The oldest surviving building at Lamayuru is a temple called Seng-ge-sgang, at the southern end of the Lamayuru rock, which is attributed to the famous builder-monk Rinchen Zangpo (958-1055 CE). Rinchen Zangpo was charged by the king of Ladakh to build 108 gompas, and certainly many gompas in Ladakh, Spiti Valley and the surrounding regions, date from his time.

The oldest gompas, those dating from Rinchen-zang-po's time — Alchi and Lamayuru, and the less accessible Wanla, Mang-gyu and Sumda — belonged at the time of their foundation to none of these Tibetan schools, whose establishment they antedate. They were at some stage taken over by the Ka-dam-pa, and when it fell into decline they were taken over again, this time mostly by the Ge-lugs-pa. The exception was Lamayuru, which was for some reason claimed by the Dri-gung-pa"

The gompa consisted originally of five buildings, and some remains of the four corner buildings can still be seen.

Lamayuru is one of the largest and oldest gompas in Ladakh, with a population of around 150 permanent monks resident. It has, in the past, housed up to 400 monks, many of which are now based in gompas in surrounding villages.

Lamayuru hosts two annual masked dance festivals in the second and fifth months of the Tibetan lunar calendar, when all the monks from the surrounding gompas gather together to pray.

The Wanla Monastery is also located nearby.

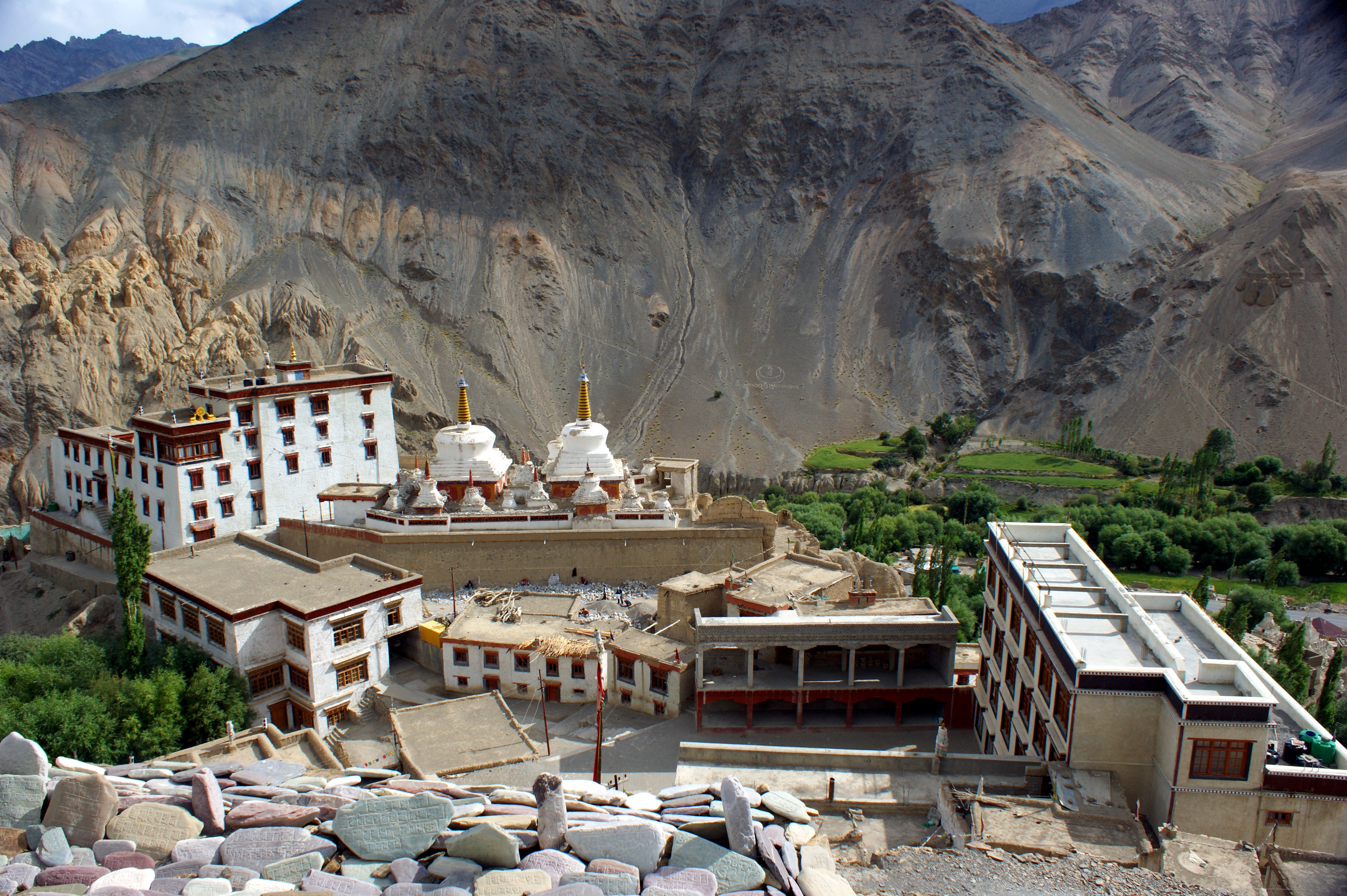

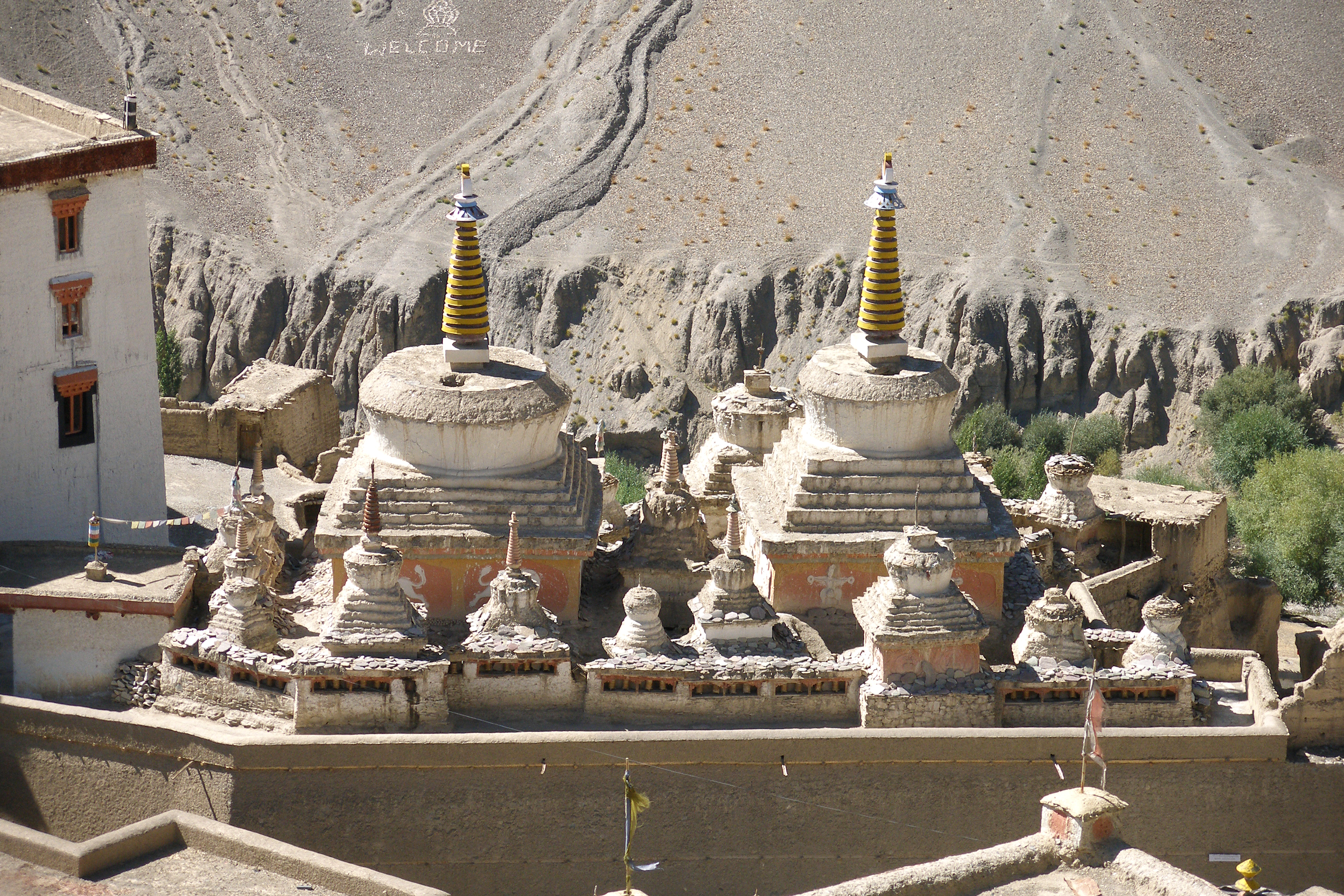

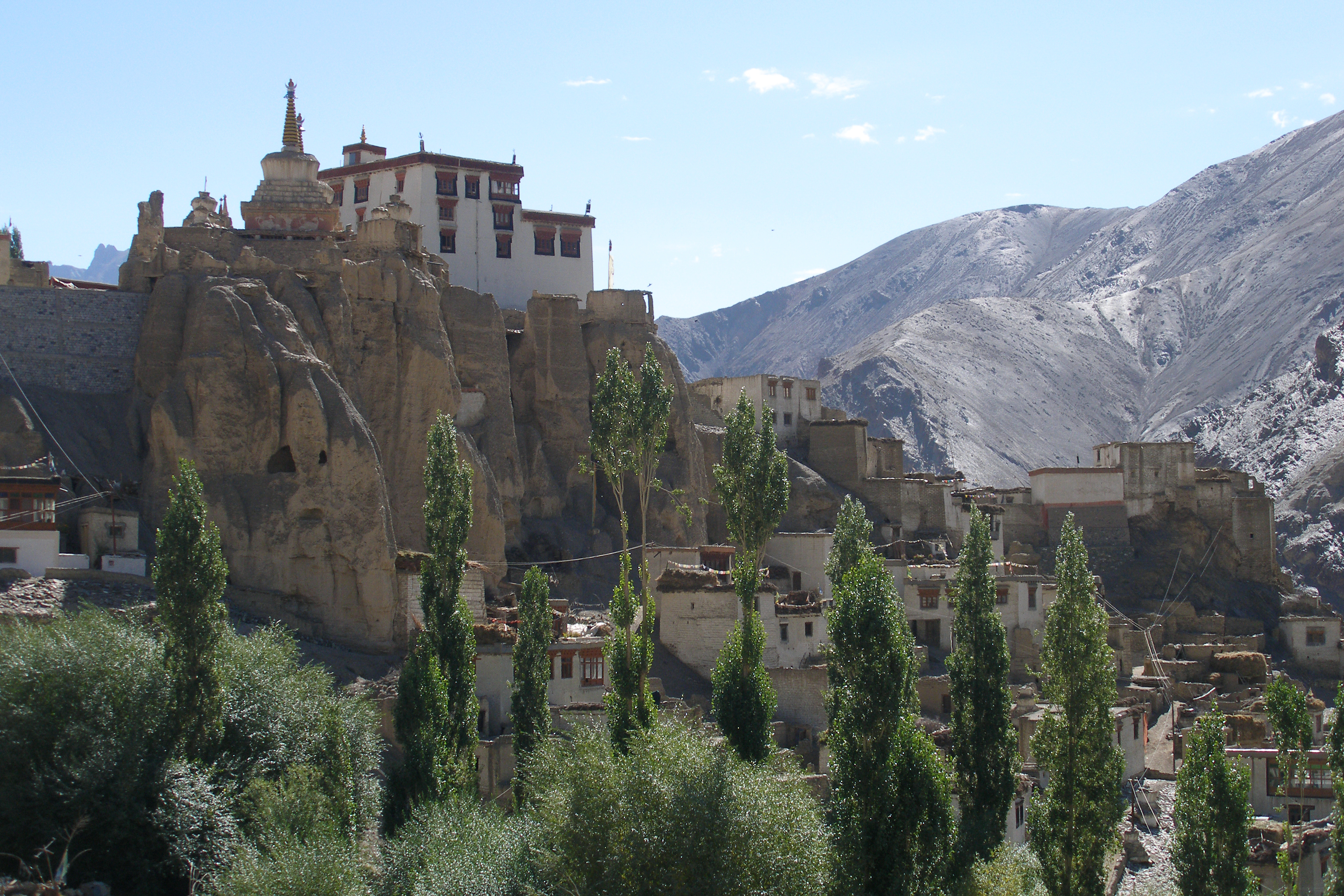

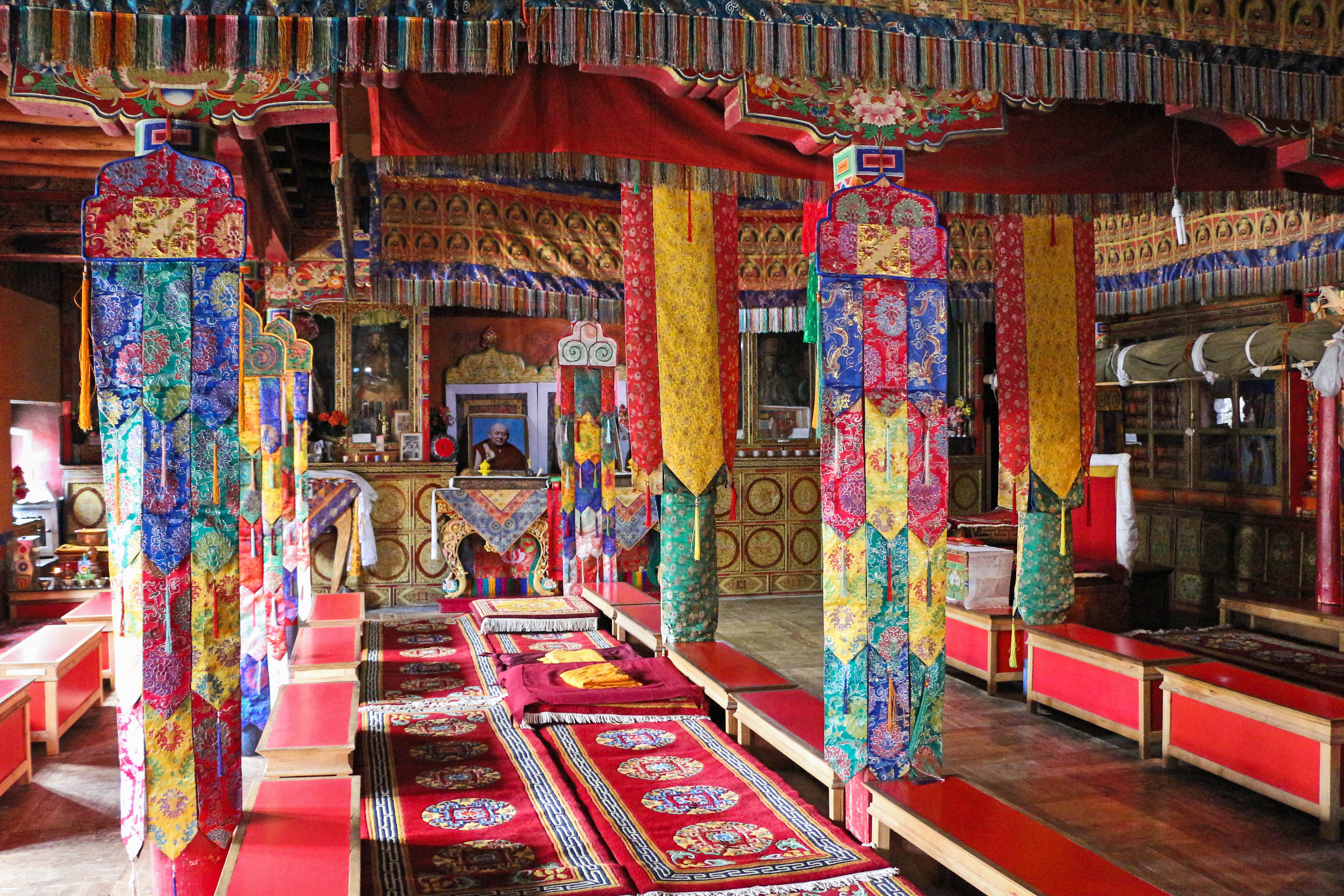

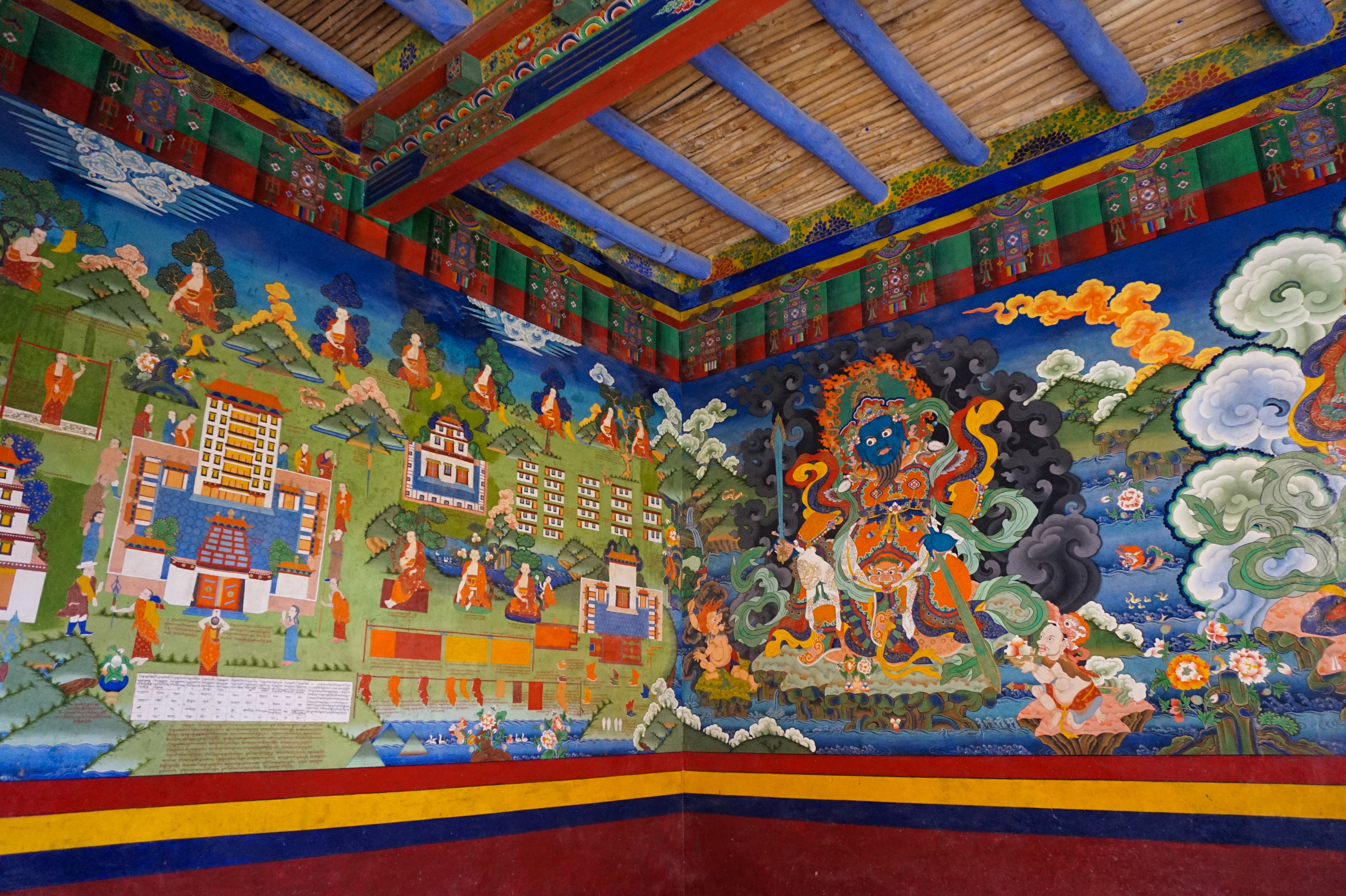

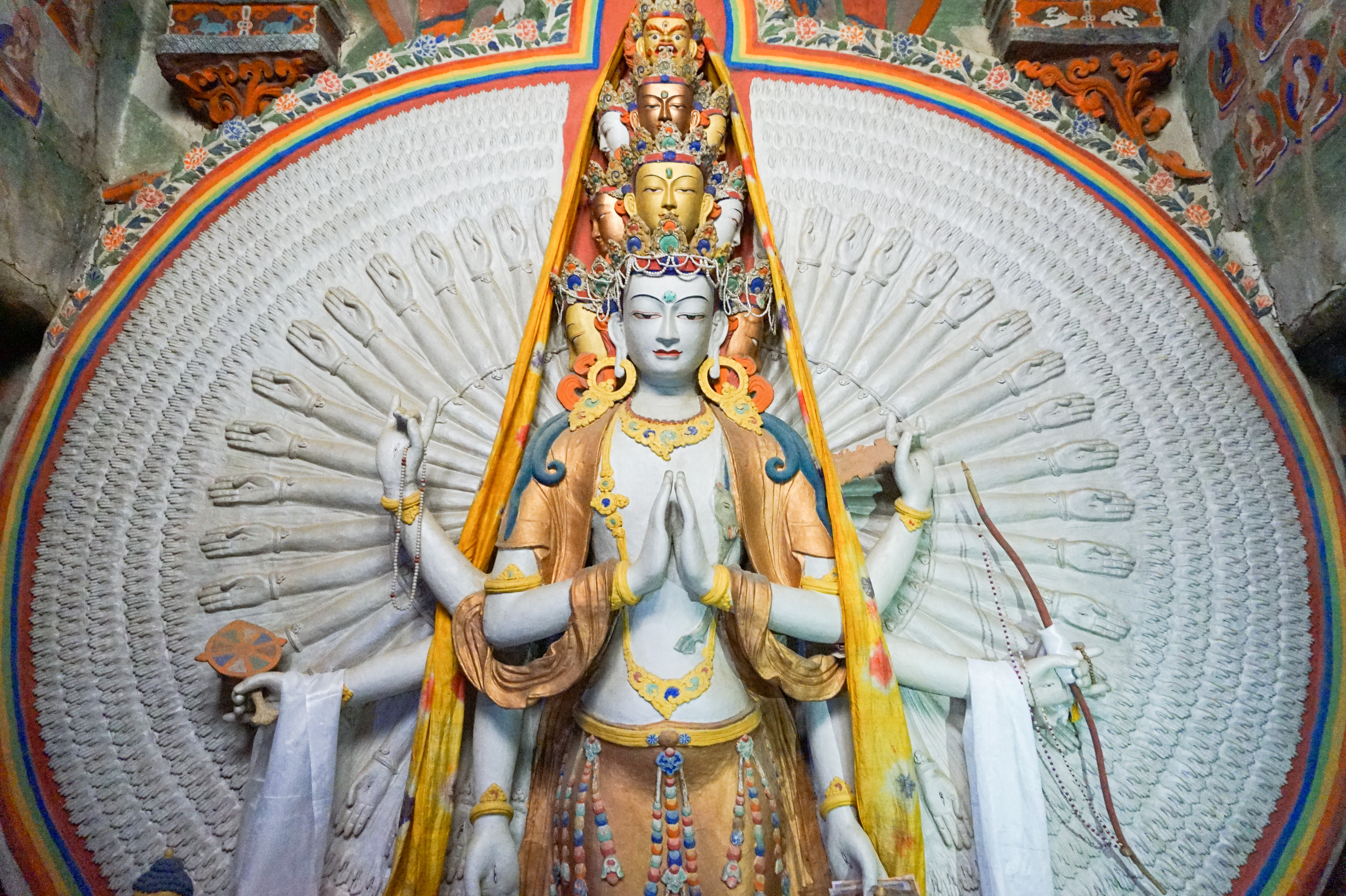

== See also ==
- List of buddhist monasteries in Ladakh
- Tourism in Ladakh
