= Phyang =

Phyang Phyang
- Village
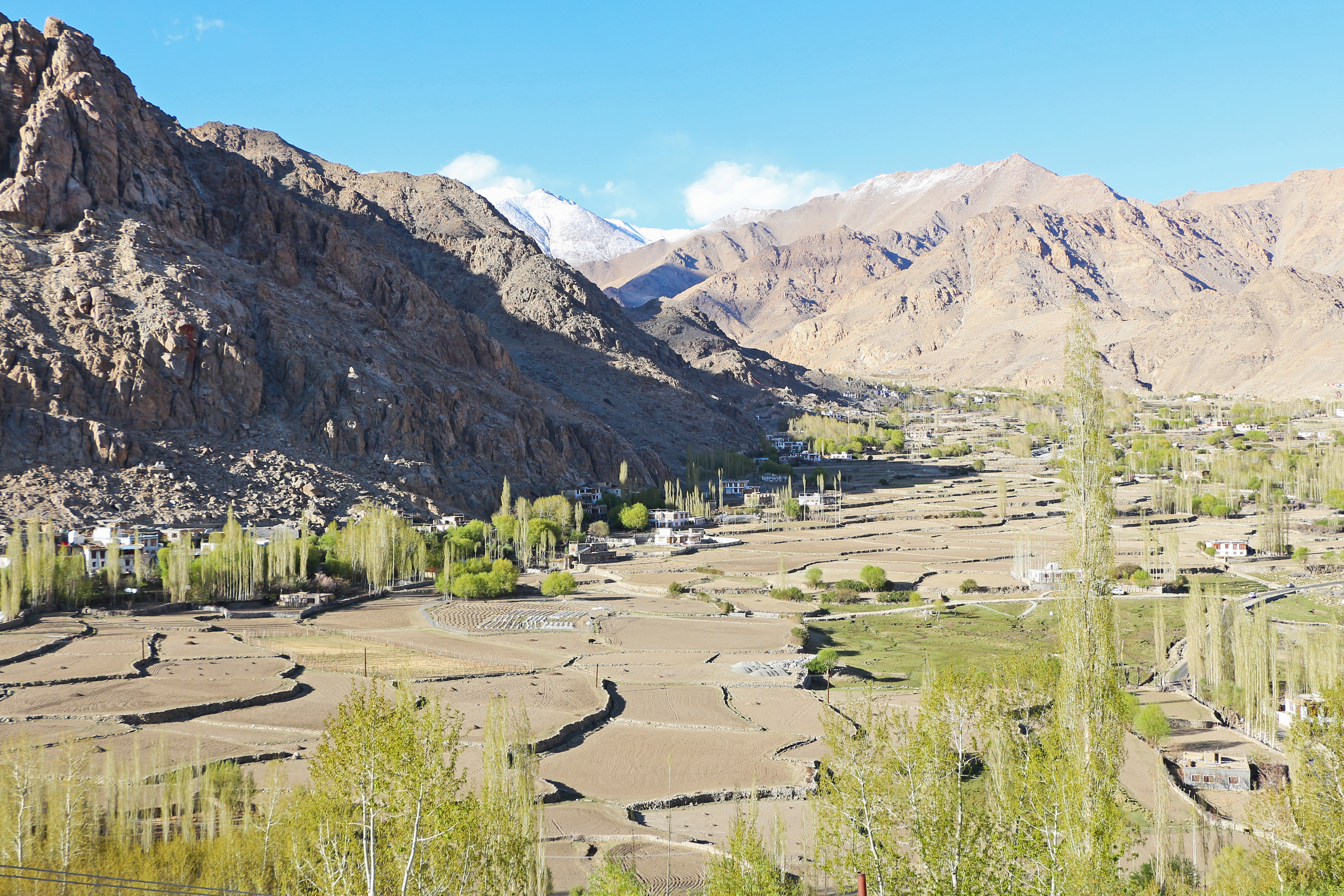
- View from Phyang Monastery

- Location in Ladakh, India Phyang (India)
- Coordinates: 34.189399°N 77.489076°E
- Country: India
- Union Territory: Ladakh
- District: Leh
- Tehsil: Leh

Population (2011)
  - Total: 2,036
- Time zone: UTC+5:30 (IST)
- Census code: 855

Phyang (previously known as Fiang) is a village and tehsil in Leh district of Ladakh in India. The Phyang Monastery is in this village. This is one of the largest inhabited villages of Ladakh, comprising eight clusters: Phulungs, Phyang, Tsakma, Changmachan, Gaon, Thangnak, Chusgo and Mankhang. It is in a south-facing valley in the Ladakh Range of mountains. The village is about 15 km (9.3 mi) long and 1.5 km (0.93 mi) average width. There is an old dilapidated castle near the cluster of Phyang on a hilltop. Just below this castle, there is a single-room temple, Lobon, with paintings of Ladakh, but in the tourism industry, it is known as Guru Lhakhang. The Tokpo river is in the middle of the valley. The source of the river is small glaciers in upper Spangkul and Lungnak valley northwest of the village at an altitude of about 5,200 m (17,100 ft). The river joins the Indus River near Phey village at a lower altitude of 3,250 m (10,660 ft). The village has some tourist facilities, including a guesthouse and campsites.

== Demographics ==
According to the 2011 census of India, Fiang has 352 households. The effective literacy rate (i.e. the literacy rate of population excluding children aged 6 and below) is 75.37%.

Demographics (2011 Census)
	Total	Male	Female
Population	2036	1064	972
Children aged below 6 years	229	124	105
Scheduled caste	0	0	0
Scheduled tribe	1998	1043	955
Literates	1362	789	573
Workers (all)	713	439	274
Main workers (total)	536	348	188
Main workers: Cultivators	185	91	94
Main workers: Agricultural labourers	2	1	1
Main workers: Household industry workers	0	0	0
Main workers: Other	349	256	93
Marginal workers (total)	177	91	86
Marginal workers: Cultivators	121	50	71
Marginal workers: Agricultural labourers	6	4	2
Marginal workers: Household industry workers	2	2	0
Marginal workers: Others	48	35	13
Non-workers	1323	625	698
