= Fotu La =

Mountain pass in India

- Hindi: fōtu lā
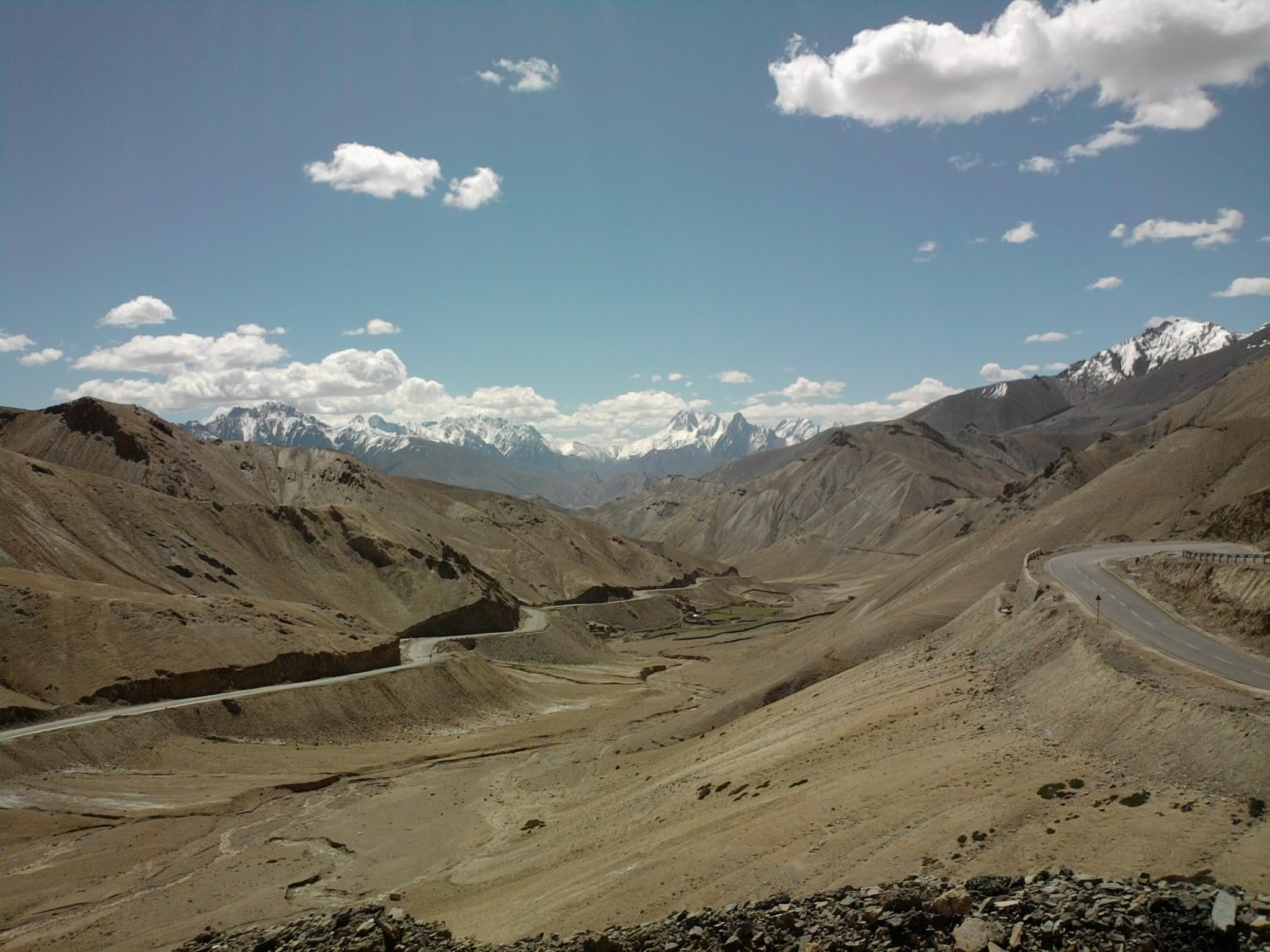
- Fotu La

- Location within Ladakh Location within India
- Elevation: 4,108 metres (13,478 ft)
- Traversed by: Srinagar-Leh highway

Third Approach
- Location: Ladakh, India
- Range: Himalaya, Ladakh Range
- Coordinates: 34°17′21″N 76°42′05″E

Fotu La (Hindi: fōtu lā) or Fatu La is a mountain pass on the Srinagar-Leh highway in the Zanskar Range of the Himalayas in India. At an elevation of 4,108 metres (13,478 ft), it is the highest point on the highway, surpassing the famed Zoji La.

Fotu La is one of two high mountain passes between Leh and Kargil, the other being Namika La.

Moving eastwards, the highway begins to descend towards the Lamayuru after Fotu La. There is a Prasar Bharati television relay station serving Lamayuru located on the pass.
