= Lamayouro =

Lamayouro Lamayuru
- Village
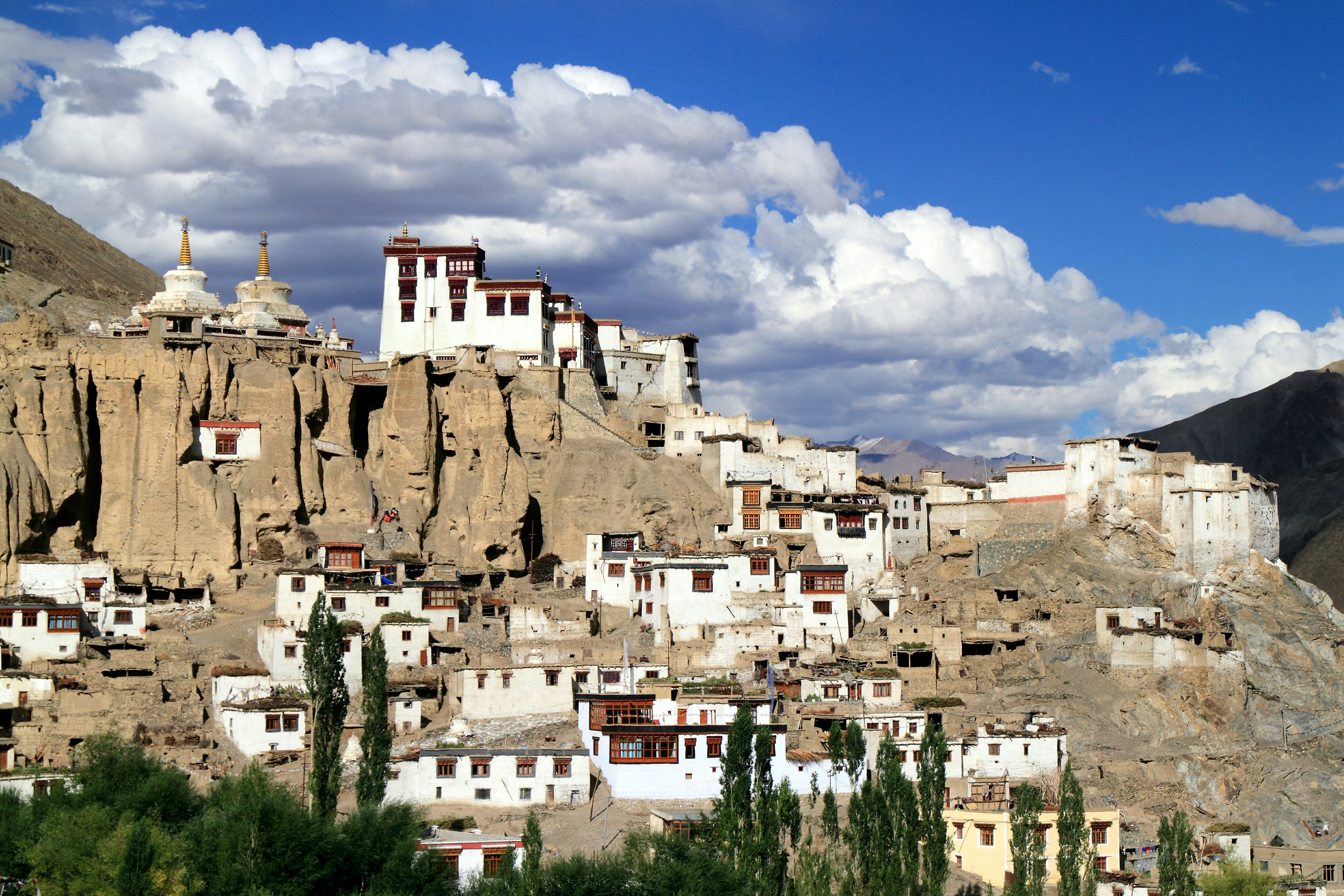
- Lamayuru Monastery

- Location in Ladakh, India Lamayouro (India)
- Coordinates: 34.2827066°N 76.773959°E
- Country: India
- Union Territory: Ladakh
- District: Sham
- Tehsil: Wanla

Population (2011)
  - Total: 667
- Time zone: UTC+5:30 (IST)
- Census code: 957

Lamayouro (also known as Lamayuru) is a village in the Sham district of Ladakh, India. The Lamayuru Monastery is located nearby. It is located in the Wanla tehsil on the NH1 Srinagar-Leh Highway 15 kilometres (9.3 mi) east of the Fotu La at a height of 3,510 metres (11,520 ft) and 19 km southwest of Khalsi. The region is also referred to as ‘Moon Land’, due to its terrain's resemblance to the surface of the Moon.

== Demographics ==
According to the 2011 census of India, Lamayouro has 117 households. The effective literacy rate (i.e. the literacy rate of population excluding children aged 6 and below) is 71.93%.

Demographics (2011 Census)
	Total	Male	Female
Population	667	331	336
Children aged below 6 years	72	41	31
Scheduled caste	0	0	0
Scheduled tribe	642	322	320
Literates	428	228	200
Workers (all)	397	202	195
Main workers (total)	197	153	44
Main workers: Cultivators	21	20	1
Main workers: Agricultural labourers	0	0	0
Main workers: Household industry workers	0	0	0
Main workers: Other	176	133	43
Marginal workers (total)	200	49	151
Marginal workers: Cultivators	188	41	147
Marginal workers: Agricultural labourers	0	0	0
Marginal workers: Household industry workers	0	0	0
Marginal workers: Others	12	8	4
Non-workers	270	129	141

== Tourism ==
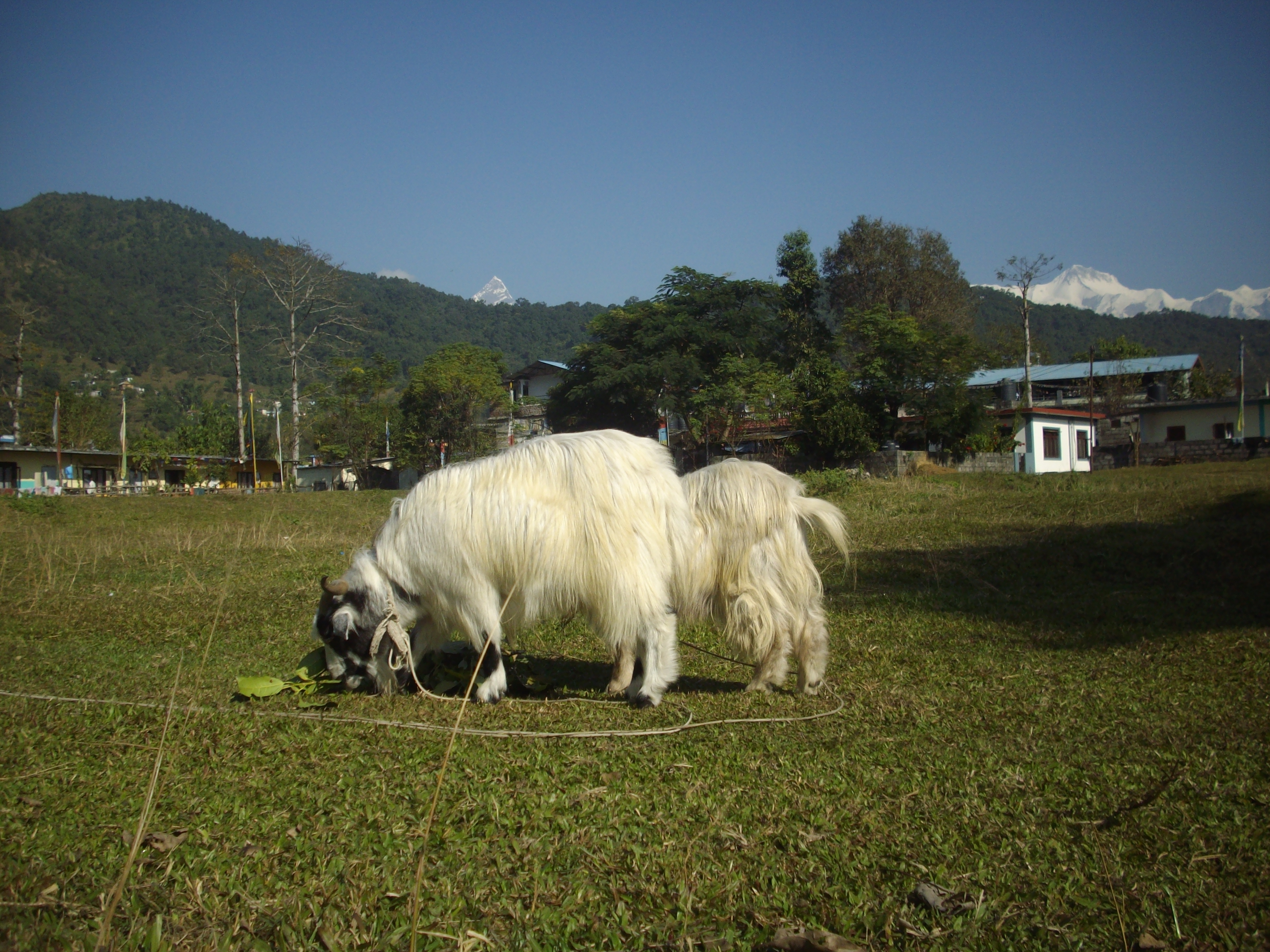
Himalayan Goats - locally called Changthangi and popular for the expensive Cashmere coat.

Lamayuru, situated 127 km from Leh in Ladakh, is a surreal destination with opportunities for photography, trekking, Ladakhi people's cultural exploration, and meditation at 11th century Lamayuru Monastry. May to September being best time to visit when temperatures are pleasant 15°C to 30°C. Lamayuru has homestays, basic resorts and boutique hotels, some of which offer rooms with moonscape-like panoramic views.

- Lamayuru Monastery: 11th-century Tibetan Buddhist monastery, also known as "Yuru Gompa" or "Tharpa Ling" (literally "place of freedom" perched at 3,510 meters, features ancient wall frescoes, murals (large wall and ceiling painting), thangka scroll paintings, and houses over 150 monks.
- Yuru Kabgyat Festival: a vibrant 2-days long annual festival, usually during June-July, features sacred masked Cham dance performed by monks of Drikung Kagyu school to commemorate Padmasambhava.
- Lomayouro Moonland landscape: enchanting crater-like eroded soft clay hills terrain that resemble the moon's surface, offering spectacular and surreal views best viewed during sunrise or sunset, or under a full moon.
- Popular Lomayouro treks in and around Lamayuru are as follows:
  - Lamayuru to Alchi Trek (5-6 days): a moderate trek passing through Prinkti La (3,750m) and the villages of Wanla and Sumdo, offering a mix of culture and scenery.
  - Lamayuru to Chilling Trek (5-6 days): a difficult, high-altitude trek crossing the Dundunchan La base.
  - Padum to Lamayuru Trek (10 days): An intensive trek through the Zanskar range, ideal for experiencing remote, mountainous landscapes and cultural heritage.
- Wildlife: While specific high-altitude predators like snow leopards are centered in Hemis National Park, the trekking trails around Lamayuru offer chances to spot Himalayan marmots (large chocolate-brown colored squirrel similar in size to a large housecat), Himalayan vultures, and hardy Himalayan sheep (locally called "Bharal" meaning "blue sheep"), and Himalayan goats (locally called "Changthangi" and popular for the expensive Cashmere coat).

== Transport ==
Air
Kushok Bakula Rimpochee Airport (code: IXL) in Leh, 105 km east of Lamayouro, is the nearest airport with regular scheduled commercial passenger flights.

Road
Located on the NH1 Srinagar-Leh highway, and accessible by road via taxi or bus from Leh or Srinagar, makes Lamayouro an ideal stopover between Kargil and Leh.

Rail
Srinagar railway station, 315 km west of Lamayouro, is the nearest railway station.

== See also ==
- Geography of Ladakh
- Tourism in Ladakh
