= Tsemo Castle =

Castle in Leh, India

Coordinates: 34.1675°N 77.5906°E

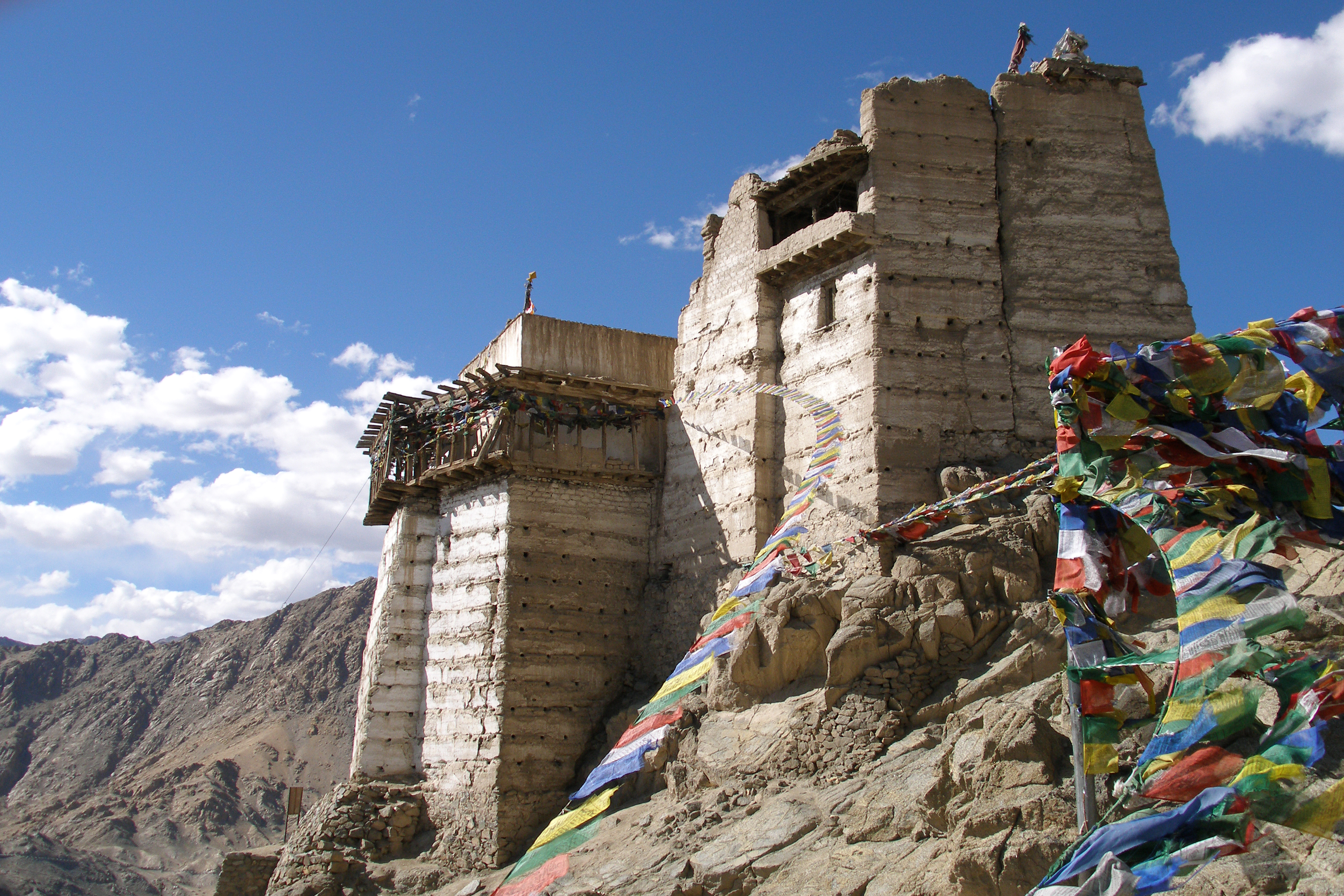
Tsemo Castle

Tsemo Castle (also known as Namgyal Tsemo or Leh Fort complex) is an important religious and historical point in Leh, Ladakh, India. It is located at a walking distance from the Leh Palace. The defensive structure is maintained by Archaeological Survey of India. It is located at the highest point in Leh.

== History ==
The castle is believed to have been built during the time of Tashi Namgyal (1555-1575).
