= Wanla Monastery =

Historic Buddhist Monastery in India

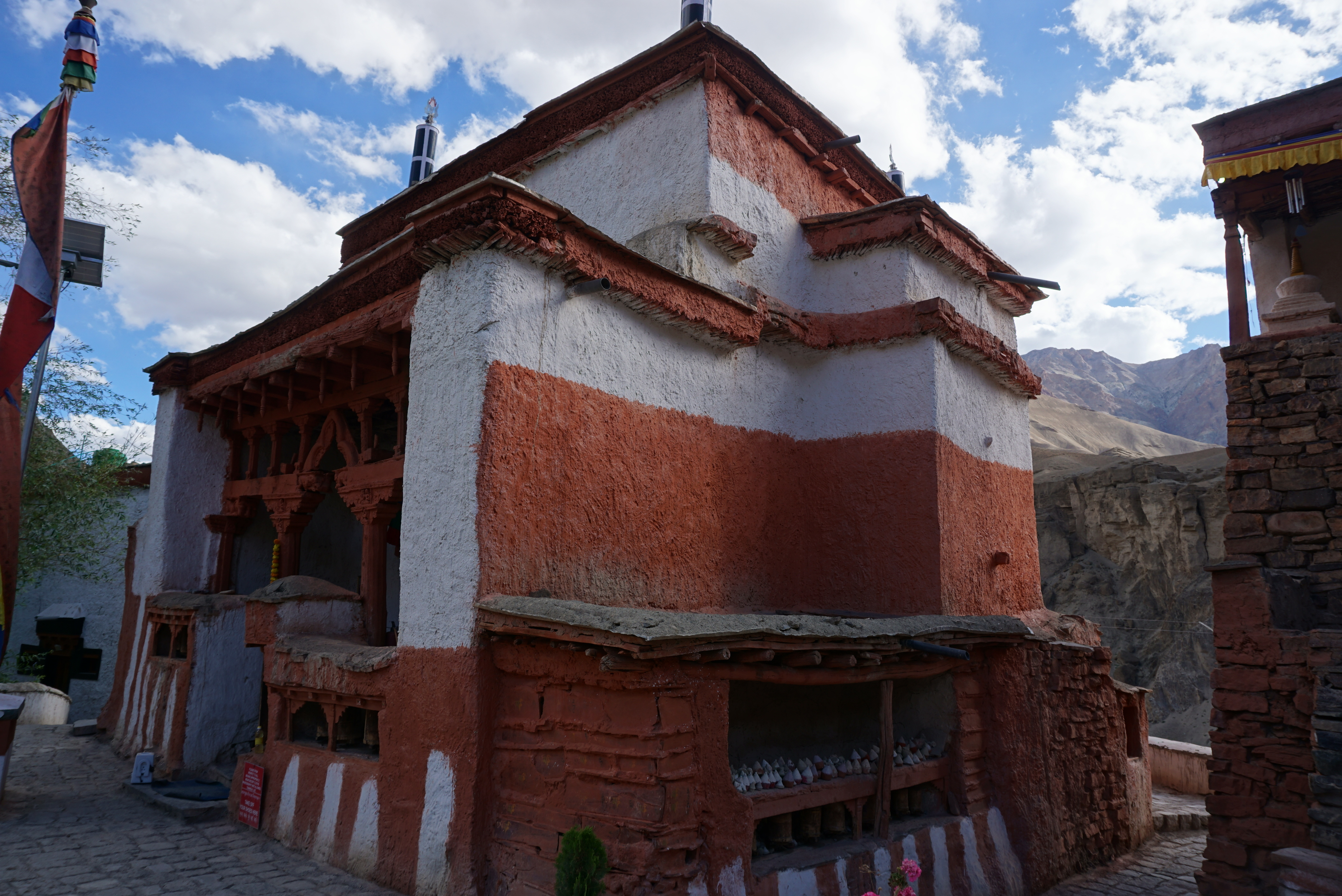

- Location within India

Religion
- Affiliation: Tibetan Buddhism
- Sect: Drigung Kagyu

Location
- Location: Wanla, Zanskar, Kargil district, Ladakh, India
- Interactive map of Wanla Monastery
- Coordinates: 34°14′58″N 76°49′52″E

Architecture
- Founder: Rinchen Sangpo (disputed)

Wanla Gompa is a historic Buddhist monastery on the ridge that crowns Wanla village in Ladakh, India. Its small but impressively preserved three-storeyed Avalokitesvara temple is one of the earliest known Drigung Kagyu prayer chambers to have survived in Ladakh. Wanla is a sub-monastery of Lamayuru, which provides a caretaker monk responsible for daily rituals and for granting access to the temple. The main image features Avalokitesvara in 11-headed ("Chuchigzhel") form. It is 13 km southeast of Lamayuru Monastery.

Along with a 1980s side building, the monastery sits within the sparse remnants of a medieval castle whose construction is mentioned in Ladakhi chronicles as being by the Ladakhi King Lhachen Ngaglug (lHa-chen Ngag-lug), i.e. probably in the 12th century. The monastery was added in the heart of the castle in the 14th century. This timing adds to academic interest in Wanla since, as some writers have described, this was "an otherwise completely obscure period of Ladakh's history between the foundation of the Alchi group of monuments, the latest of which are to be attributed to the early 13th century, and the establishment of the Ladakhi kingdom in the early 15th century".

The temple is currently being restored by the Achi Association.

== See also ==
- List of buddhist monasteries in Ladakh
- Geography of Ladakh
- Tourism in Ladakh
