= Phyang Monastery =

Monastery in Ladakh, India

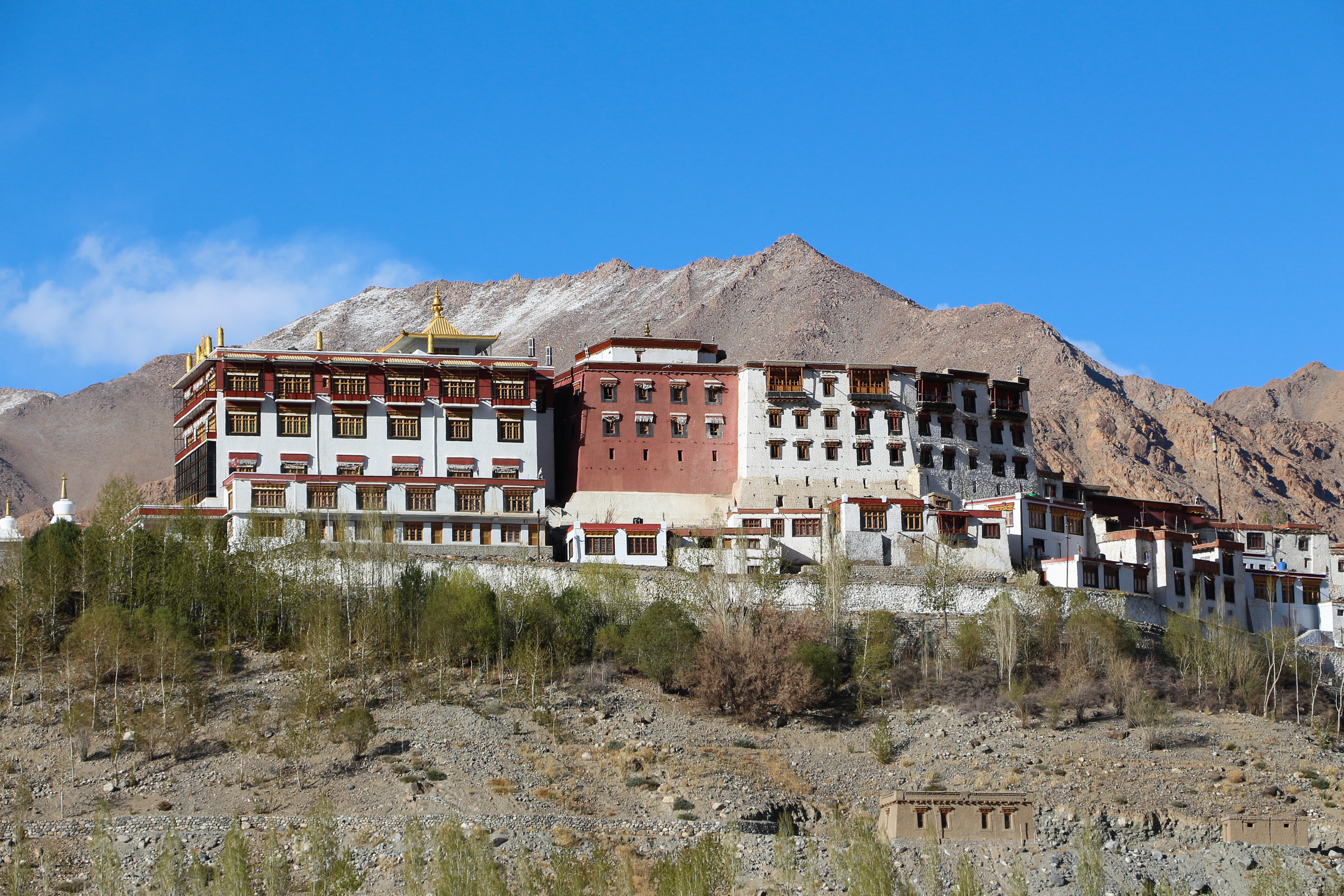

- Location within India

Religion
- Affiliation: Tibetan Buddhism
- Sect: Drikung Kagyu
- Festivals: Gang-Sngon Tsedup Festival- 28 and 29 of the fifth month Sacred dances -2nd -3rd of the 6th month
- Leadership: drikung skyabgon chetsang rinpoche (head teacher); Skyabje Toldan Rinpoche (rein. head lama)

Location
- Location: Fiang, Leh district, Ladakh, India
- Coordinates: 34°11′11″N 77°29′22″E

Architecture
- Founder: chosje dharma kunga takpa
- Established: 1515; 511 years ago

Phyang Monastery, Phyang (or Phiyang) Gompa is a Buddhist monastery located in Fiang village, just 15 or 16 kilometres west of Leh in Ladakh, northern India. It was established in 1515.

== Name ==
The local name of Phyang Monastery is "Gangon Tashi Chodzong" (Ladakhi: སྒང་སྔོན་བཀྲ་ཤིས་ཆོས་རྫོང།; sgang sngon bkra shis chos rdzong). The name is derived from Gang Ngonpo (སྒང་སྔོན་པོ་) which means blue mountain, referring to the hill behind the monastery.

== History ==
There are a couple of divergent traditions regarding its founding.

"The site where the monastery now stands was once a part of the numerous monastic properties, offered during the time of Dharmaraja Jamyang Namgial to Chosje Damma Kunga. The hill of Phyang served as the venue of a monastery, known as Tashi Chozong, established in the year 1515. A monastic community was introduced to the monastery and with this started, the first establishment of the Digung teachings in Ladakh."

Others say that it was founded by king Tashi Namgyal, whose reign has been established from independent sources to have been in the third quarter of the sixteenth century. There are a number of chronological difficulties in establishing events in Ladakh at this period and it is assumed that some names have been omitted from the Chronicle either from mistakes in memory or tradition, or a deliberate attempt to eradicate some events which were thought better forgotten.

The monastery is one of the earliest monasteries in Ladakh belonging to the Drikung Kagyu, Dri-gung-pa or Drigungpa school, one of eight schools derived from the teachings of Phakmadrupa Dorje Gyelpo (1110-1170 CE). There are many Drikung monasteries in Ladakh: three main and more than thirty branch monasteries.

After the monastery was built, it specialised in Drigung teachings. The special protector of monastery is Achi Choki Dolma Aphyi Choskyi Sdrolma.The current reincarnation of Skyabje Toldan Rinpoche is the head lama.

== Description ==
Phyang contains numerous sacred shrines inside the monastery, frescoes dating from the royal period, and a 900-year-old museum which has an extensive collection of idols including a number of fine Kashmiri bronzes probably dating to the 14th century, thangkas, Chinese, Tibetan and Mongolian firearms and weapons.

== Festival ==
The Gang-Sngon Tsedup Festival is held annually from 17th day to 19th day of the first month of the Tibetan calendar. On the 2nd and 3rd day of the 6th month of the Tibetan calendar Phyang serves as a venue for sacred dances.

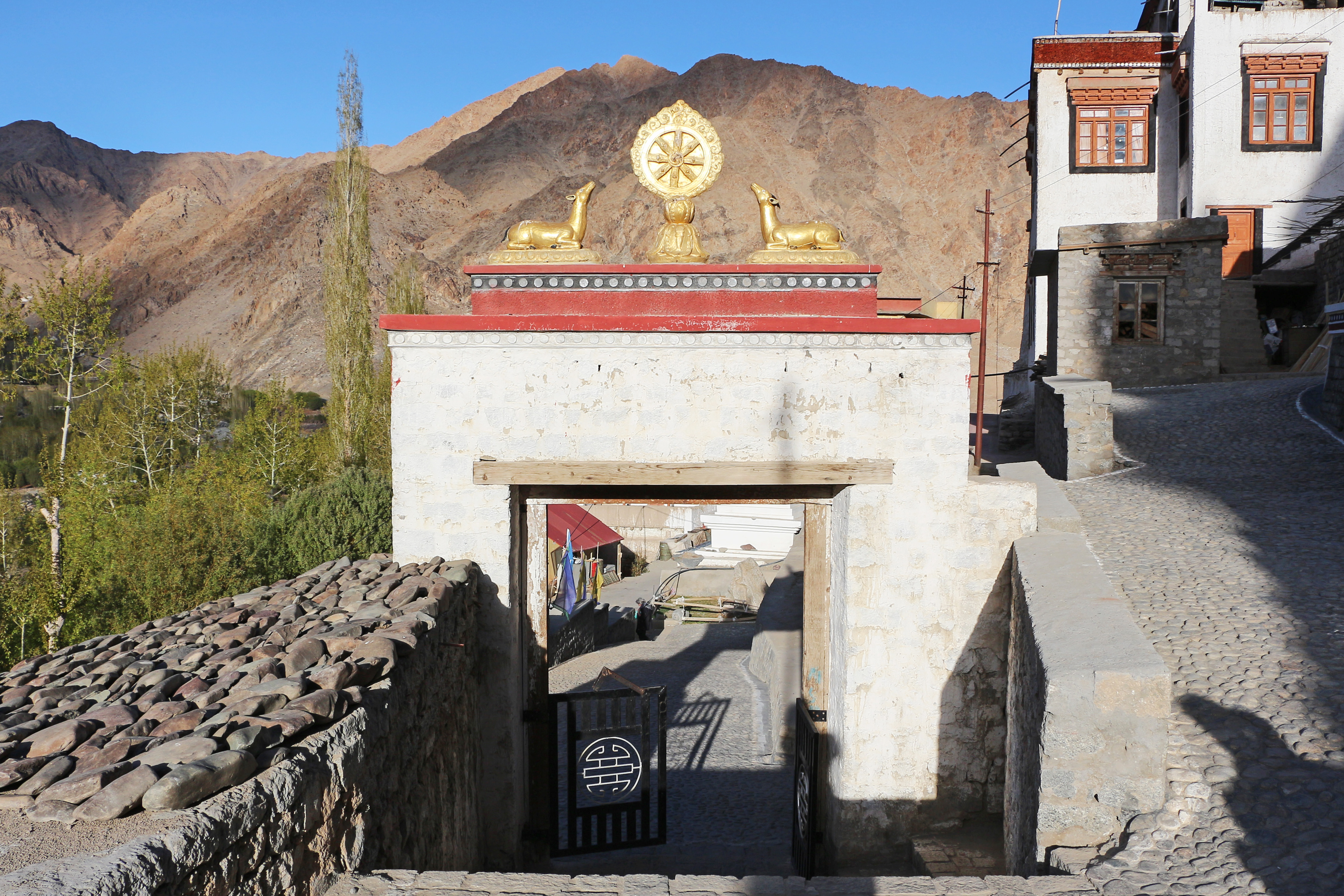
Entrance

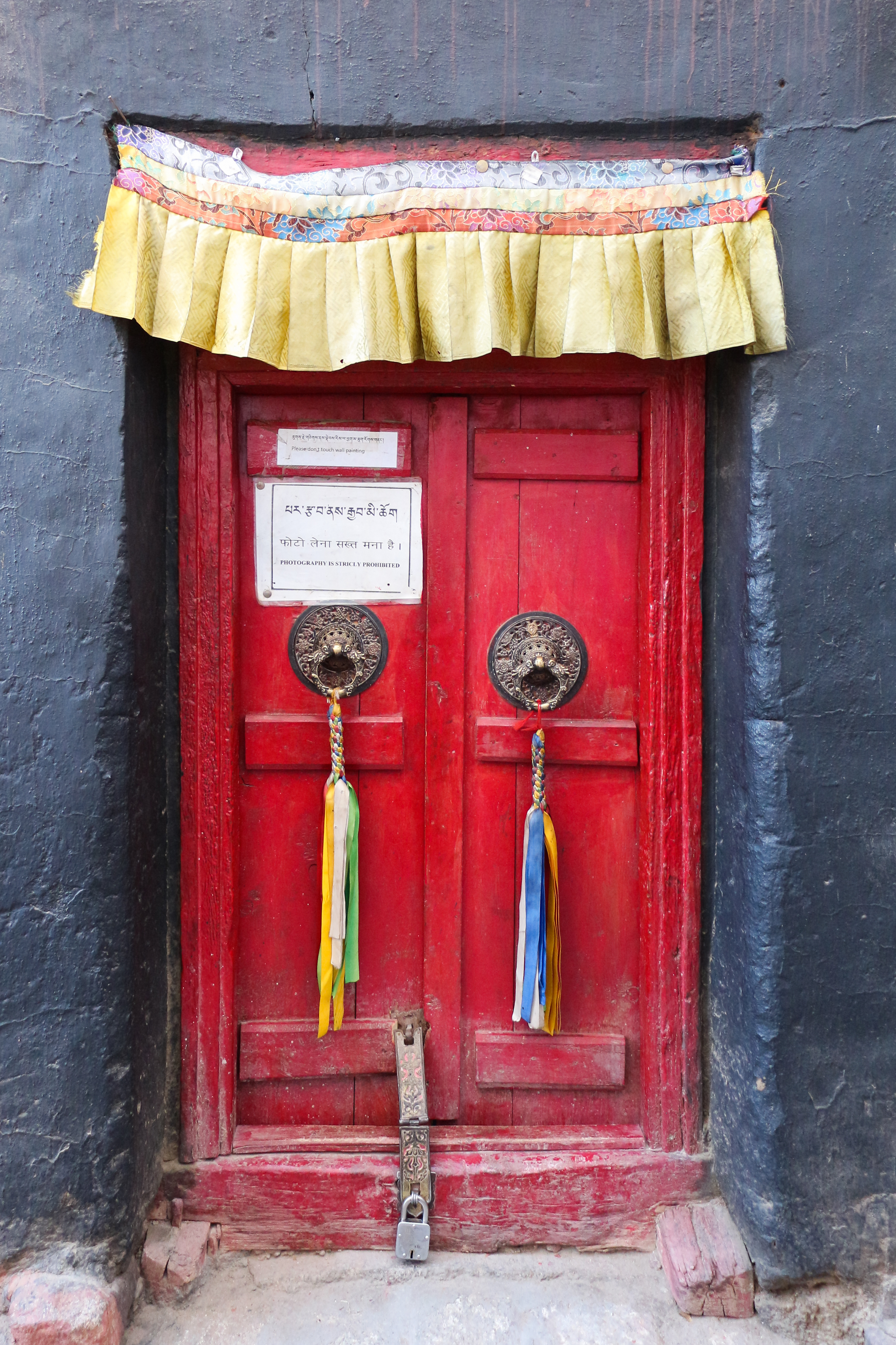
Door in the monastery

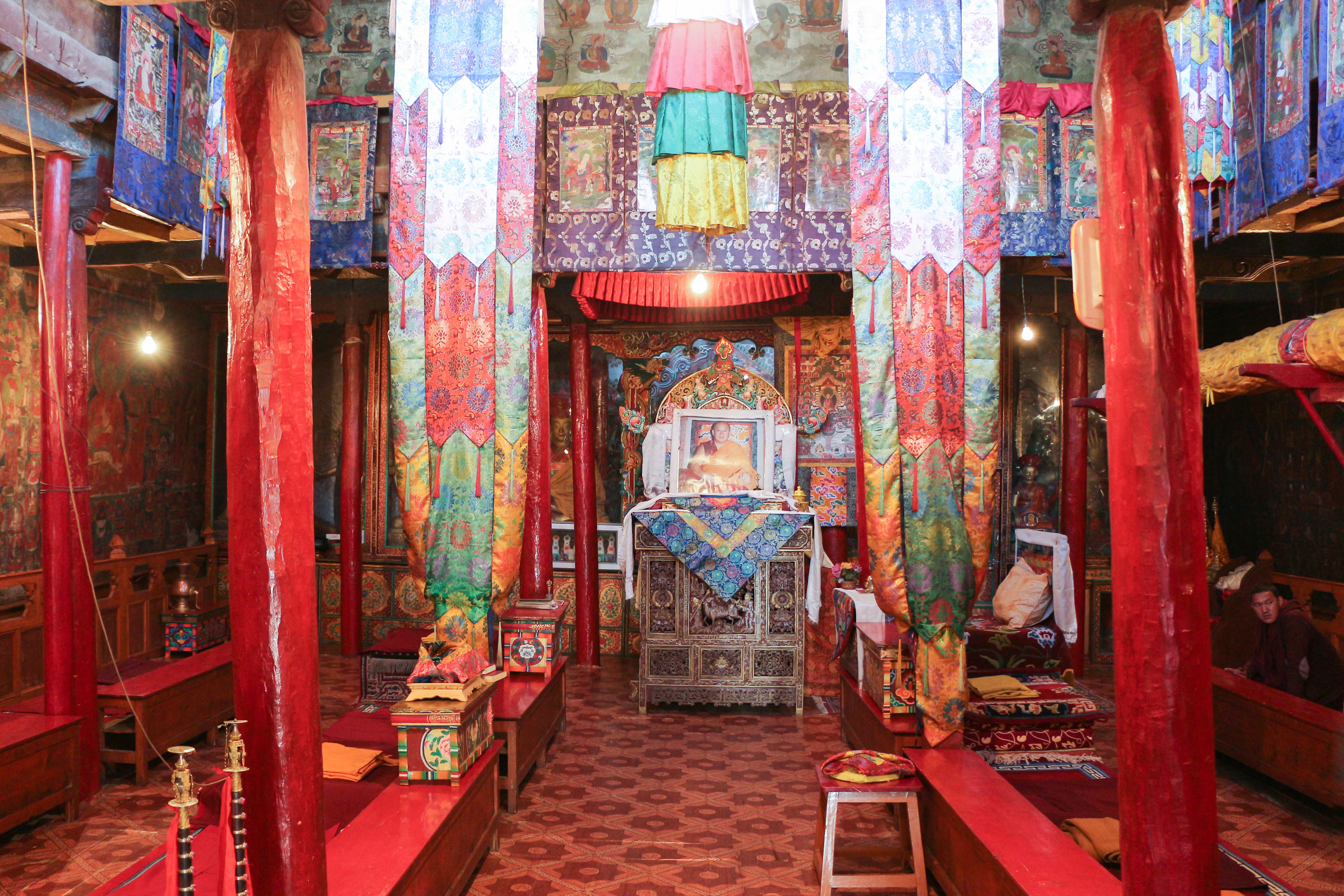
Interior

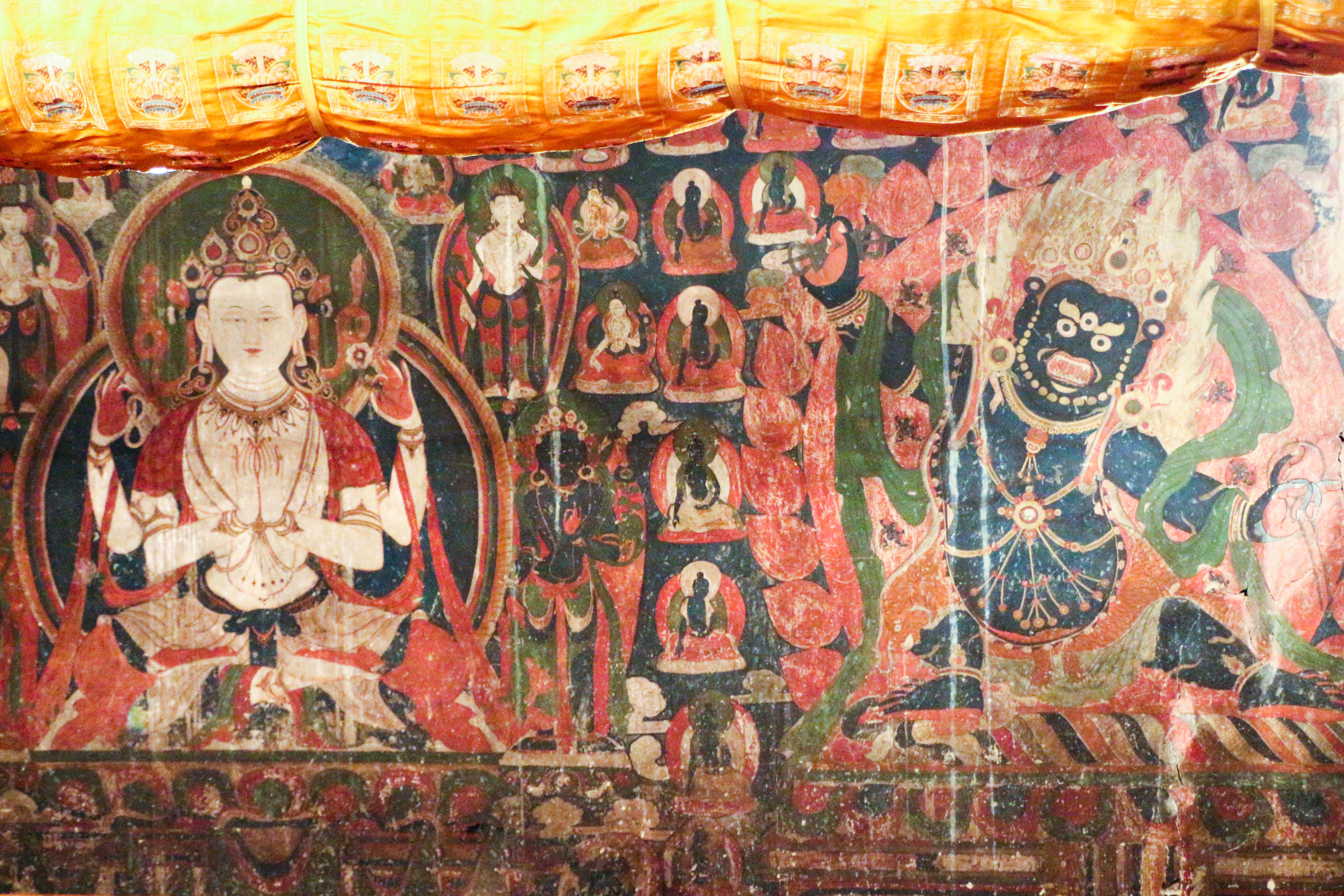
Fresco inside the monastery

== See also ==
- List of buddhist monasteries in Ladakh
- Geography of Ladakh
- Tourism in Ladakh
