= Monuments of National Importance =

This article contains lists of Monuments of National Importance in India.

An Archaeological Sites and Remains Act, 1958 defines an "Ancient Monument" as follows:

Ancient Monument means any structure, erection or monument, or any tumulus or place of interment, or any cave, rock-sculpture, inscription or monolith which is of historical, archaeological or artistic interest and which has been in existence for not less than 100 years

A "Monument of National Importance" is designated by the Archaeological Survey of India and includes the following:

1. The remains of an ancient monument
2. The site of an ancient monument
3. The land on which there are fences or protective covering structures for preserving the monument
4. Land by means of which people can freely access the monument

In 2023 an updated list was published by National Monument Authority which identifies a total of 3757 monuments.

== Table of monuments ==
The Monuments of National Importance are designated by the Archaeological Survey of India (ASI). The union government of India is authorised to maintain, protect and promote the Monuments of National Importance.

Monuments of National Importance designated by the ASI
States		No. of Monuments
Andhra Pradesh	List	129
Arunachal Pradesh	List	5
Assam	List	55
Bihar	List	70
Chhattisgarh	List	47
Goa	List	21
Gujarat	List	203
Haryana	List	90
Himachal Pradesh	List	43
Jharkhand	List	12
Karnataka	List	506
Kerala	List	26
Madhya Pradesh	List	292
Maharashtra	List	285
Manipur	List	1
Meghalaya	List	8
Mizoram	List	8
Nagaland	List	4
Odisha	List	78
Punjab	List	33
Rajasthan	List	163
Sikkim	List	3
Tamil Nadu	List	413
Telangana	List	8
Tripura	List	8
Uttar Pradesh	List	741
Uttarakhand	List	44
West Bengal	List	133
Union territories		No. of Monuments
Andaman and Nicobar Islands	–	0
Chandigarh	–	0
Dadra and Nagar Haveli and Daman and Diu	List	12
Delhi	List	174
Jammu and Kashmir	List	56
Ladakh	List	13
Lakshadweep	–	0
Puducherry	–	0
Total:		3,684

== See also ==
- State Protected Monuments of India
- National Geological Monuments of India
- List of World Heritage Sites in India
- List of Water Heritage Sites in India
- List of rock-cut temples in India
- List of forts in India
- List of museums in India
