= Thikse Monastery =

Tibetan Buddhist monastery near Leh, Ladakh, India

Thiksey Monastery
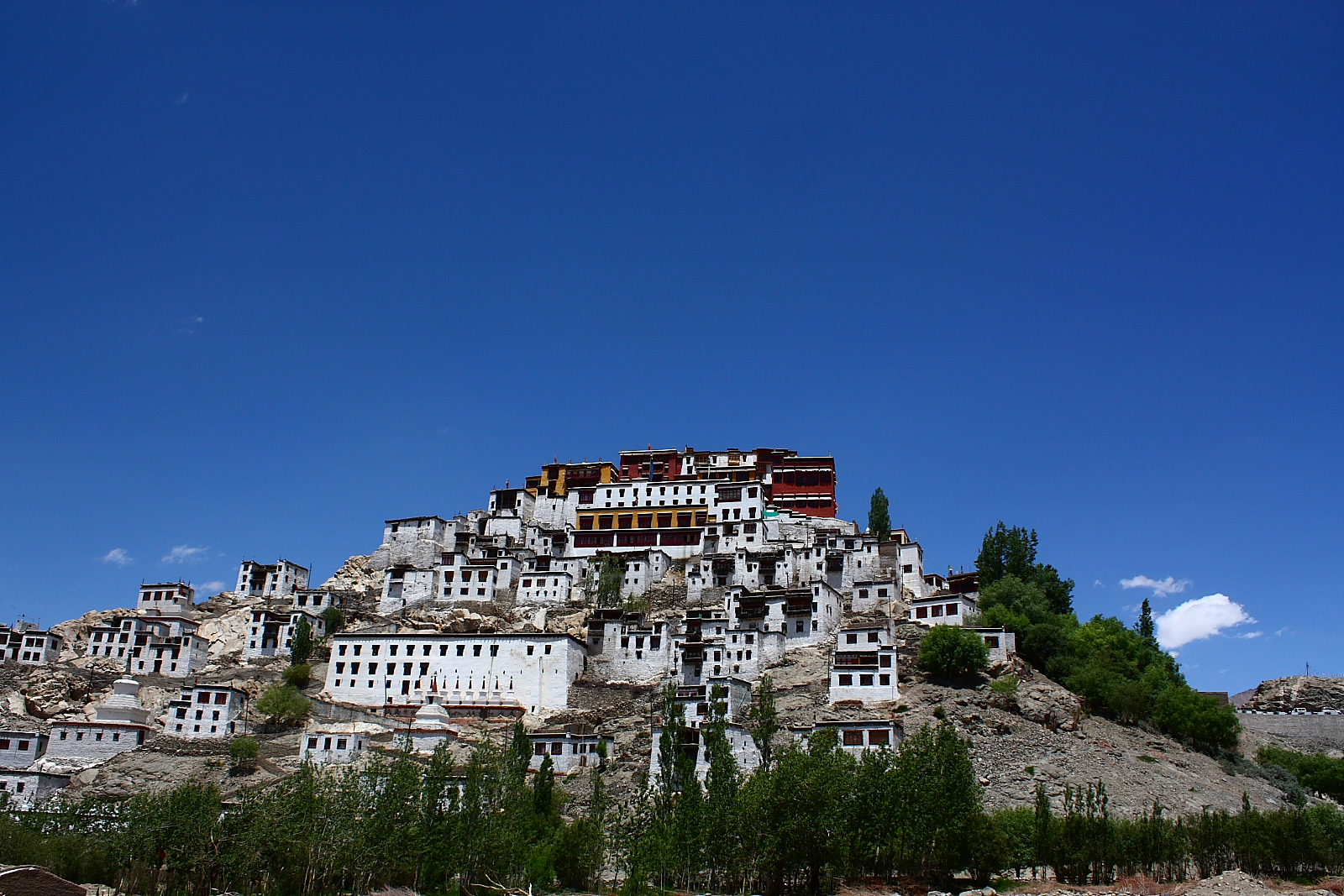
- Thiksey Monastery

- Location within Ladakh

Religion
- Affiliation: Tibetan Buddhism
- Sect: Gelug

Location
- Location: Thiksey, Ladakh, India
- Coordinates: 34°03′20.41″N 77°39′59.4″E

Architecture
- Style: Dzong
- Established: 1433; 593 years ago

Thiksey Monastery or Thiksey Gompa (also transliterated from Ladakhi as Thikse, Thiksay or Tikse) is a Buddhist monastery affiliated with the Gelug school of Tibetan Buddhism. It is located on top of a hill in Thiksey approximately 19 kilometres (12 mi) east of Leh, in the Ladakh region of northern India. It is noted for its resemblance to the Potala Palace in Lhasa, Tibet, and is the largest monastery in central Ladakh, notably containing a separate set of buildings for female renunciates that has been the source of significant recent building and reorganization.

The monastery is located at an altitude of 3,600 metres (11,800 ft) in the Indus Valley. It is a twelve-storey complex and houses many items of Buddhist art such as stupas, statues, thangkas, wall paintings and swords. One of the main points of interest is the Maitreya Temple installed to commemorate the visit of the 14th Dalai Lama to this monastery in 1970; it contains a 15-metre (49 ft) high statue of Maitreya, the largest such statue in Ladakh, covering two stories of the building.

== History ==
In the early 15th century, Je Tsongkhapa, the founder of the Gelug School—often called "the Yellow Hats"—sent six of his disciples to remote regions of Tibet to spread the teachings of the new school. Tsongkhapa gave one of his disciples, Jangsem Sherap Zangpo (Wylie: shes rab bzang po), a small statue of Amitayus (the saṃbhogakāya form of Amitābha), containing bone powder and a drop of Tsongkhapa's own blood. Tsongkhapa directed him to meet the King of Ladakh with a message seeking his help in the propagation of Buddhism.

The King, who was then staying in the Nubra Valley near Shey, loved the gift of the statue. After this meeting, the King directed his minister to help Sherab Zangpo to establish a monastery of the Gelug order in Ladakh. As a result, in 1433, Zangpo founded a small village monastery called Lhakhang Serpo "Yellow Temple" in Stagmo, north of the Indus. In spite of his efforts, the lamas who embraced the Gelug order were initially few, although some of his disciples became eminent figures over the years.

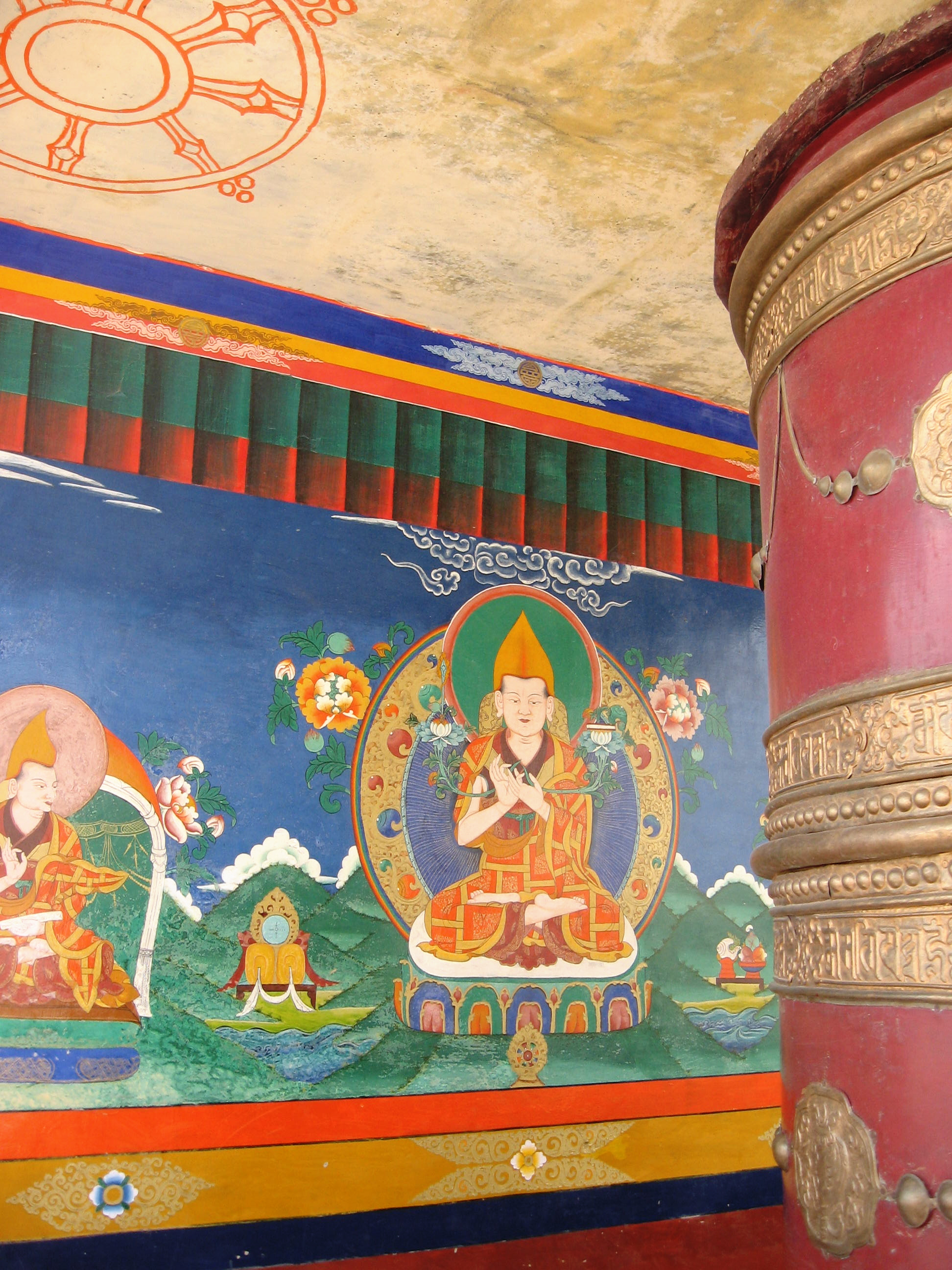
Je Tsongkhapa pictured behind a prayer wheel, in a painting near the steps that lead to the main part of Thikshe monastery

In the mid 15th century, Palden Zangpo continued the monastic work started by his teacher, Sherab Zangpo. He decided to build a larger monastery here that was dictated by an unusual event that occurred while choosing a site. Legends narrate that Tsongkhapa had predicted that his doctrine would prosper on the right bank of the Indus River. This prediction came true when the Thiksey Monastery was established. This was followed by others such as Spituk Monastery and Likir Monastery, which are also situated on the right bank of the Indus.

According to legend, Sherab Zangpo and Palden Zangpo were performing sacred rituals near the Yellow Temple. The torma offerings were then taken to a rock outcrop to be thrown down to the valley. As they were about to throw the torma into the valley, two crows appeared and carried away the ceremonial plate with the offering of torma. They then placed the torma at a location on the other side of the hill. When Palden Zangpo and his disciples began looking for the torma, they reached Thiksey, where they found that the crow had placed the torma on a stone in perfect order and in an undisturbed condition. Palden took this finding as a divine directive to build the monastery there.

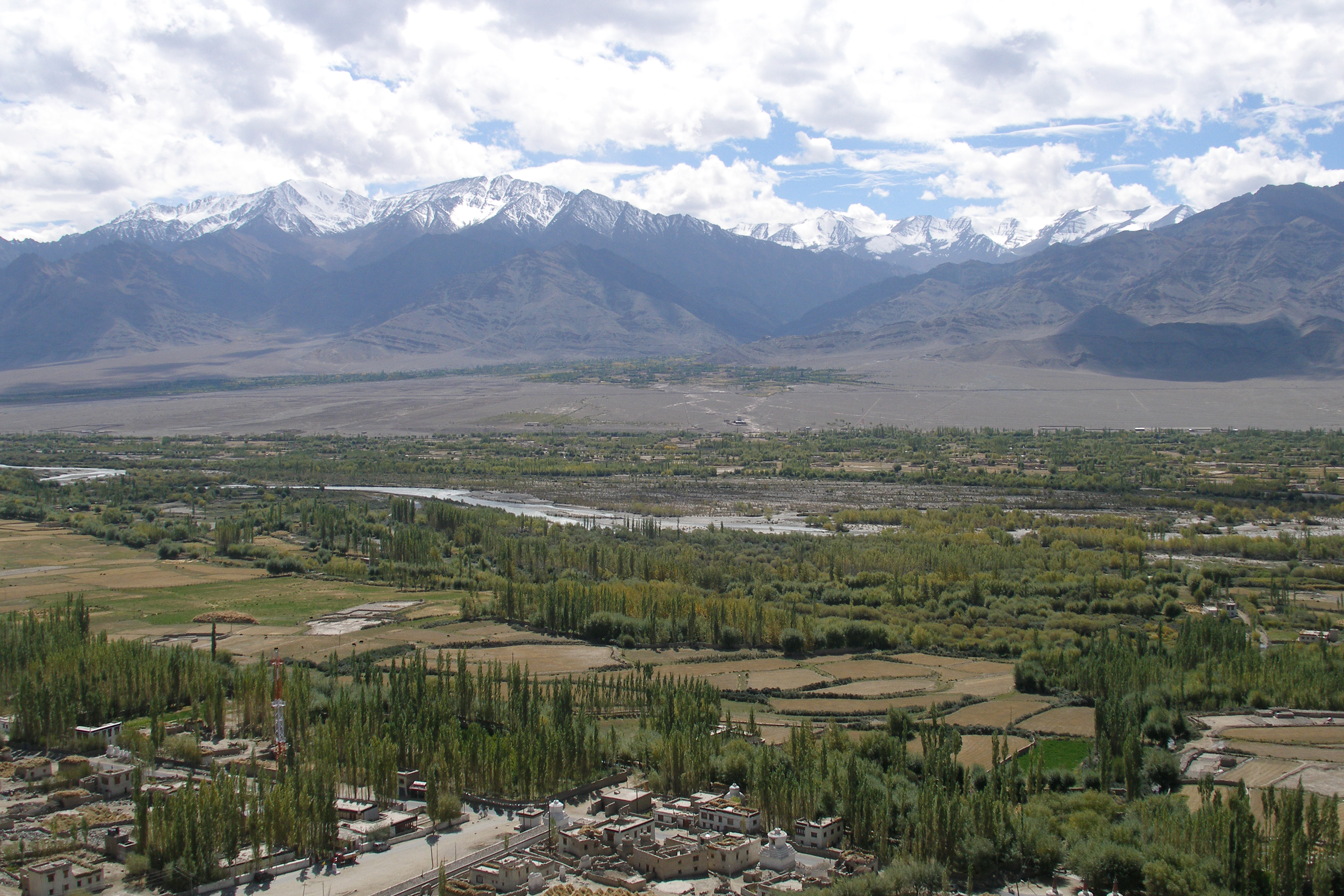
View from Thiksey Monastery

The new Thiksey monastery was located a few kilometres away from Stagmo, on a sacred hill above a village of the same name. The monastery is believed to have been built on the site of an earlier Kadam establishment or as a daughter house of the small chapel of Stakmo about 7 kilometres (4.3 mi) to the north. Rinchen Zangpo is also known to have built a temple named Lakhang Nyerma at Thiksey dedicated to the protector Dorje Chenmo. Today, all that can be seen are some ruins.

Thiksey grew in prominence in Ladakh, second only to Hemis Monastery, administering ten other monasteries in the region, such as Diskit, Spituk, Likir and Stok. The monastery came to own or control 1,327 acres (537 ha) of land and some 25 villages became attached to the monastery.

In around 1770, the lama of Hanle Monastery dictated that his elder son should inherit the throne of Ladakh while other princes should be lamas at Thikse and Spituk. As a result, princes such as Jigsmet Namgyal served as lamas at Thikse.

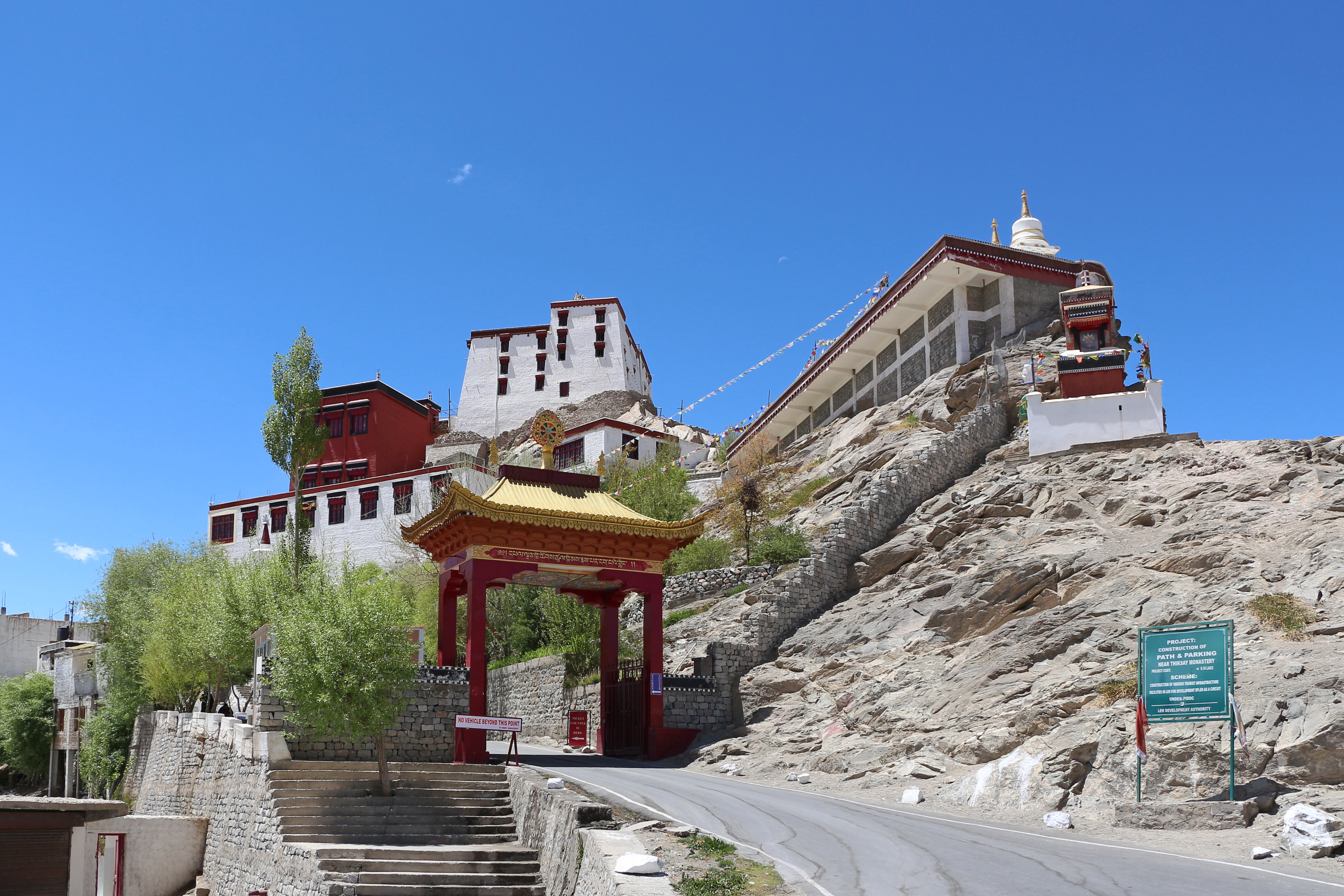
Entrance of Thiksey Monastery

=== Modern history ===
Restoration of the old monasteries in Ladakh, including the Thiksey Monastery, is being carried out by the Archaeological Survey of India, at the request of the concerned monastery administration. This, however, has not been without its controversy. It is said that the traditional mud and stone courtyards changed to granite, which has marred the brightness of the place. Similarly, restoration of the right wing of the monastery, involving construction of a new kitchen and a dining hall for the monks, replacing the old traditional central courtyard, has caused dissonance to the entire old edifice of the monastery. As a result, a balance to the restoration and renovation works has been sought to retain the old order in consonance with the new works.

== Structure ==
=== Exterior ===
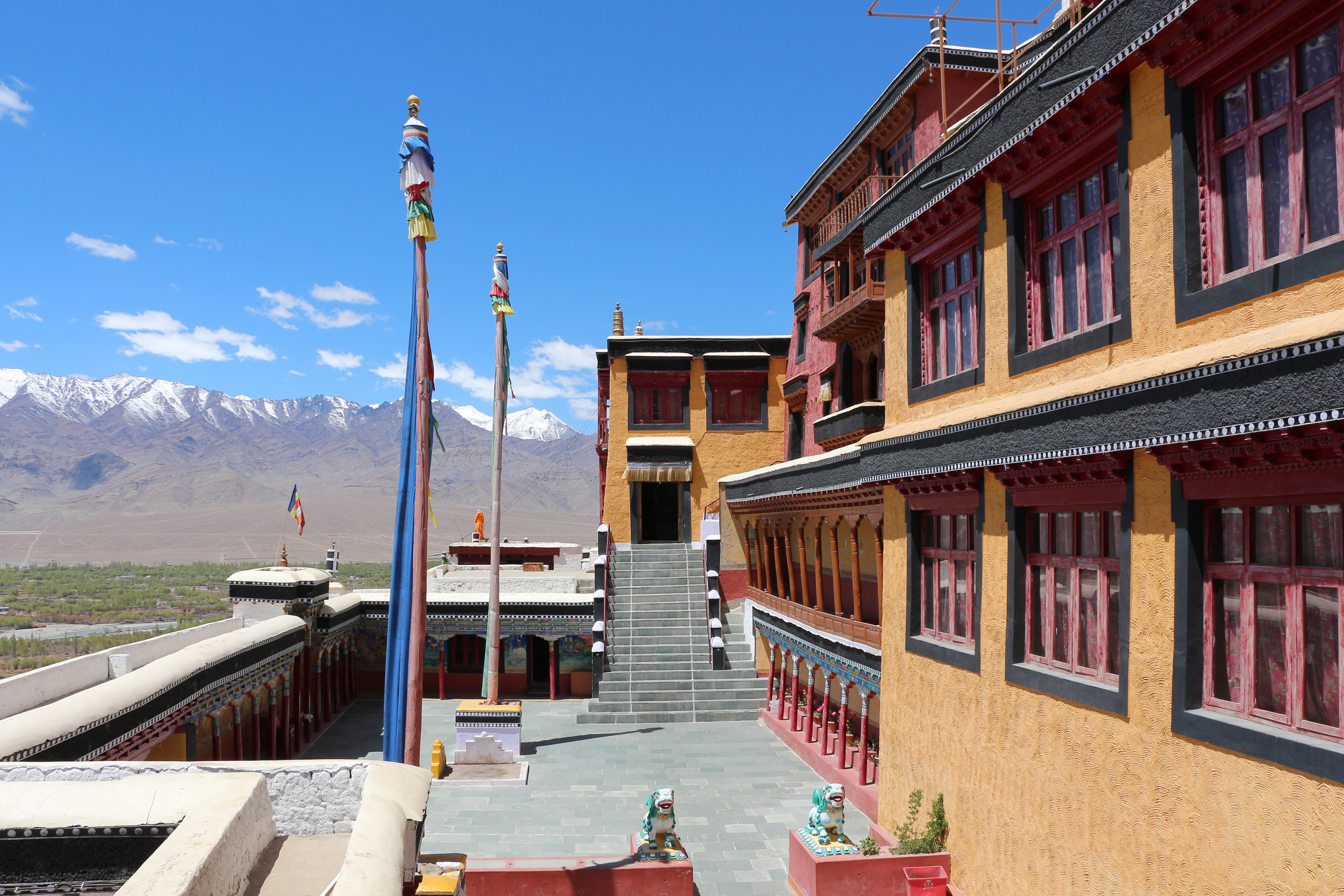
The courtyard and view from the monastery

Thikse Monastery is the largest such structure in central Ladakh. Located on a hill slope, its buildings are arranged in ascending order of importance and are well spaced, from the foot of the hill housing the dwelling units to the top of the hill enshrining the monasteries and 'pho brang' (official residence) of the chief lama. The architecture strongly resembles that of the Potala Palace in Lhasa, Tibet, the former official seat of the Dalai Lamas. Thus, Thikse Monastery is also known as 'Mini Potala'. The motorable access road from the valley passes the east side of the Thikse Monastery's main building. There is a statue of the Tibetan protective deity on this path at the entrance at the lower level. The highest level of the complex has a stupa (chorten).

The monastery precinct at the foot of the hill has a courtyard from which a flight of steps leads to the main monastery (one of the 10 temples here), which is 12 stories in height. It has two main chambers. The monastery is painted in red, ochre and white and houses 60 lamas. It has an attached nunnery. Like Likir and Rangdum monasteries, it was built as a fort monastery in the Central Tibetan pattern. There are excellent views across the Indus Valley flood plain both east and west of it, from which the gompa at Matho (to the east), the royal palace at Stok (across the valley to the south) and the former royal palace at Shey (to the west) are clearly visible.

=== Maitreya Buddha ===
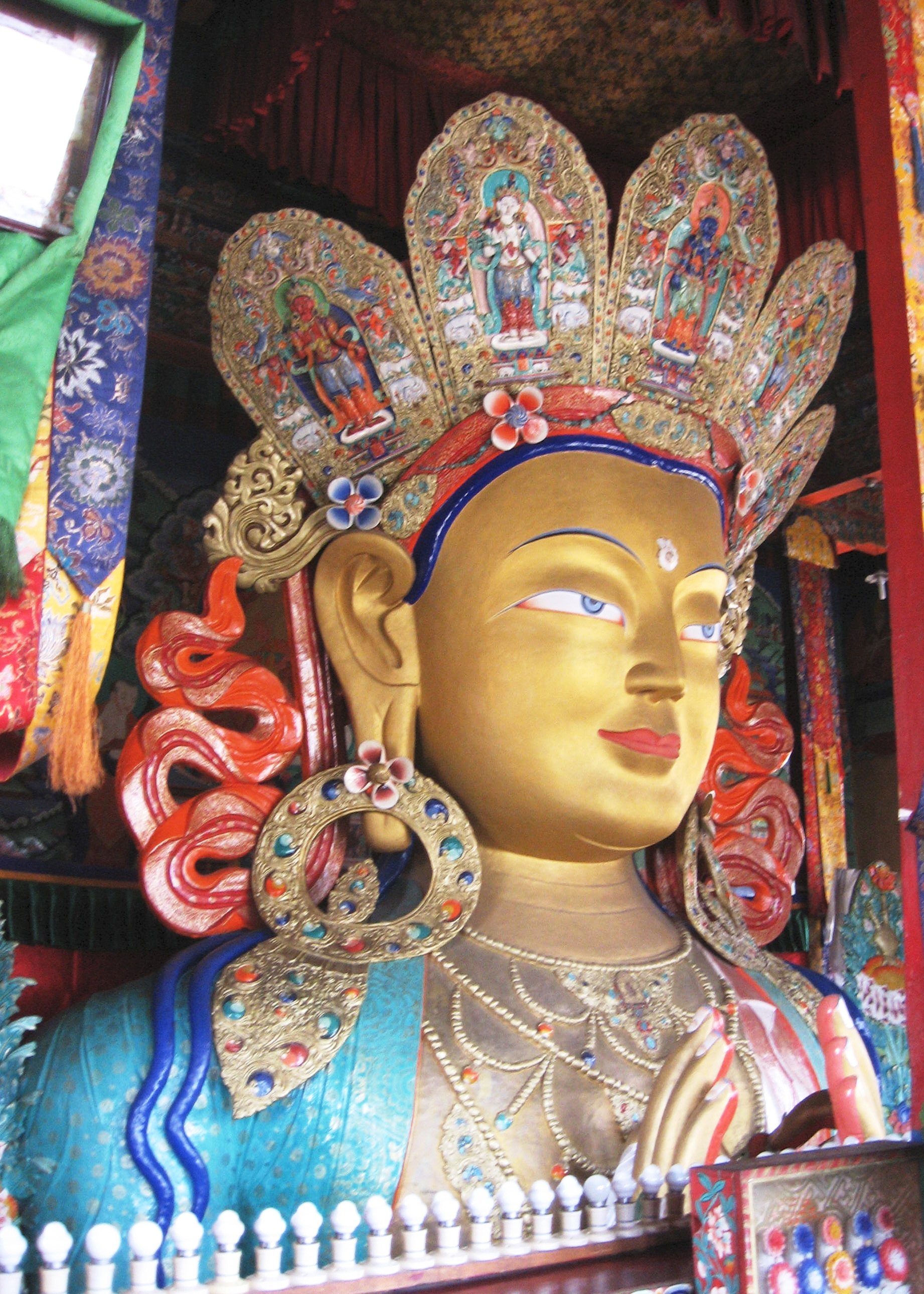
The statue of Maitreya Buddha at Thikse is two storeys tall.

One of the main points of interest is the Maitreya (future Buddha) Temple erected to commemorate visit of the 14th Dalai Lama to this monastery in 1970. It contains a 15-metre (49 ft) high statue of Maitreya Buddha, the largest such statue in Ladakh, covering two stories of the building. Unusually, he is portrayed as seated in the lotus position rather than in his usual representations, standing or in a sitting posture on a high throne. It is the largest Buddha statue in the monastery, and took four years to build. It was made by local artists under the master Shilp Guru Nawang Tsering of the Central Institute of Buddhist Studies (Leh) - in clay, gold paint and copper.

=== Assembly Hall ===
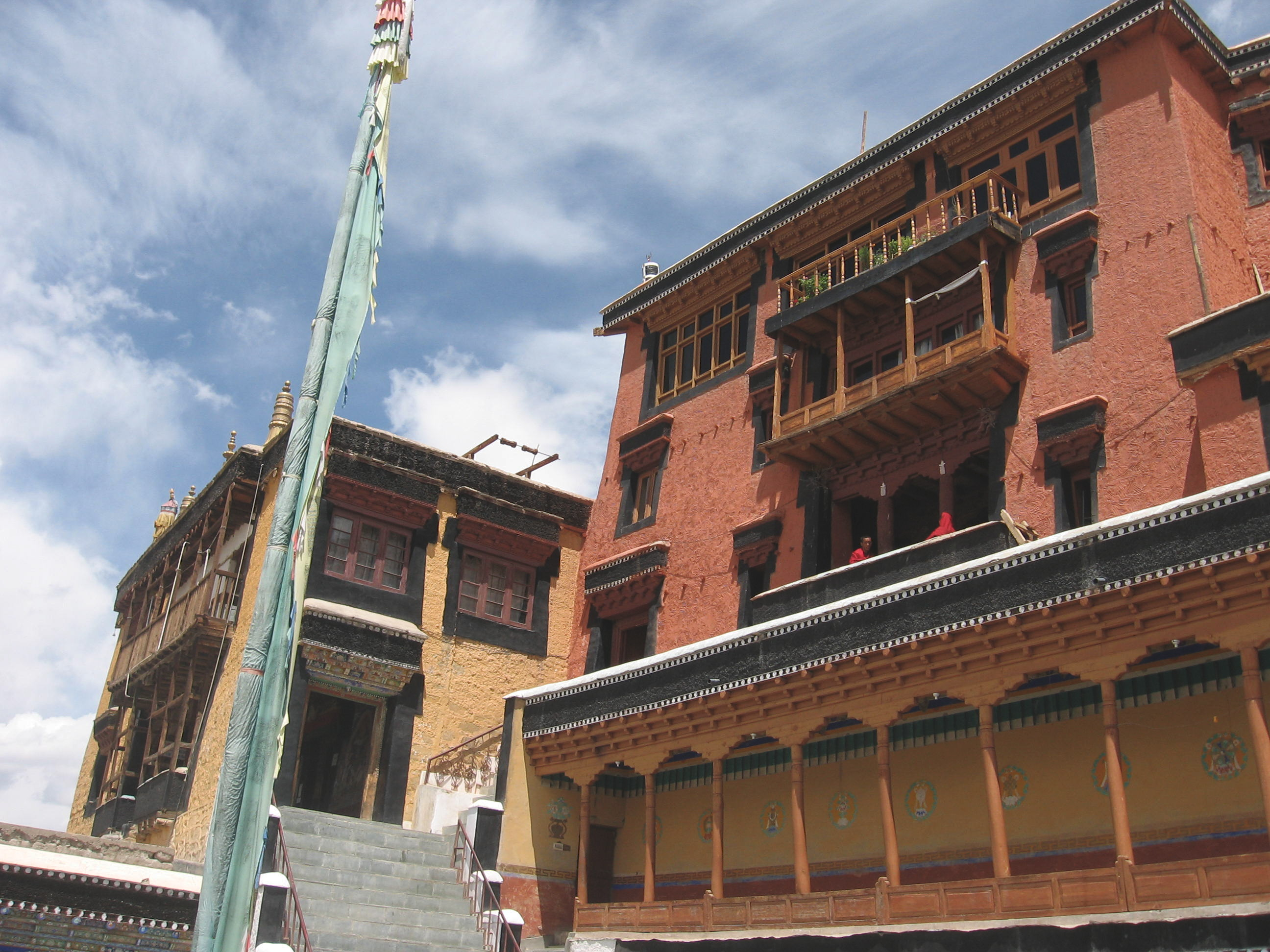
The yellow building has the assembly hall. The red building has the guardian deity shrine.

A wall at the entrance to the assembly hall or main prayer hall depicts murals of the Tibetan calendar with the Bhavacakra (Wheel of Life). This wheel has insignia images of a snake, a bird and a pig that signify ignorance, attachment, and aversion. The purpose of this depiction is meant to remind that these earthly ties need to be overcome in order to get enlightenment in life and to prevent the cycle of death and rebirth.

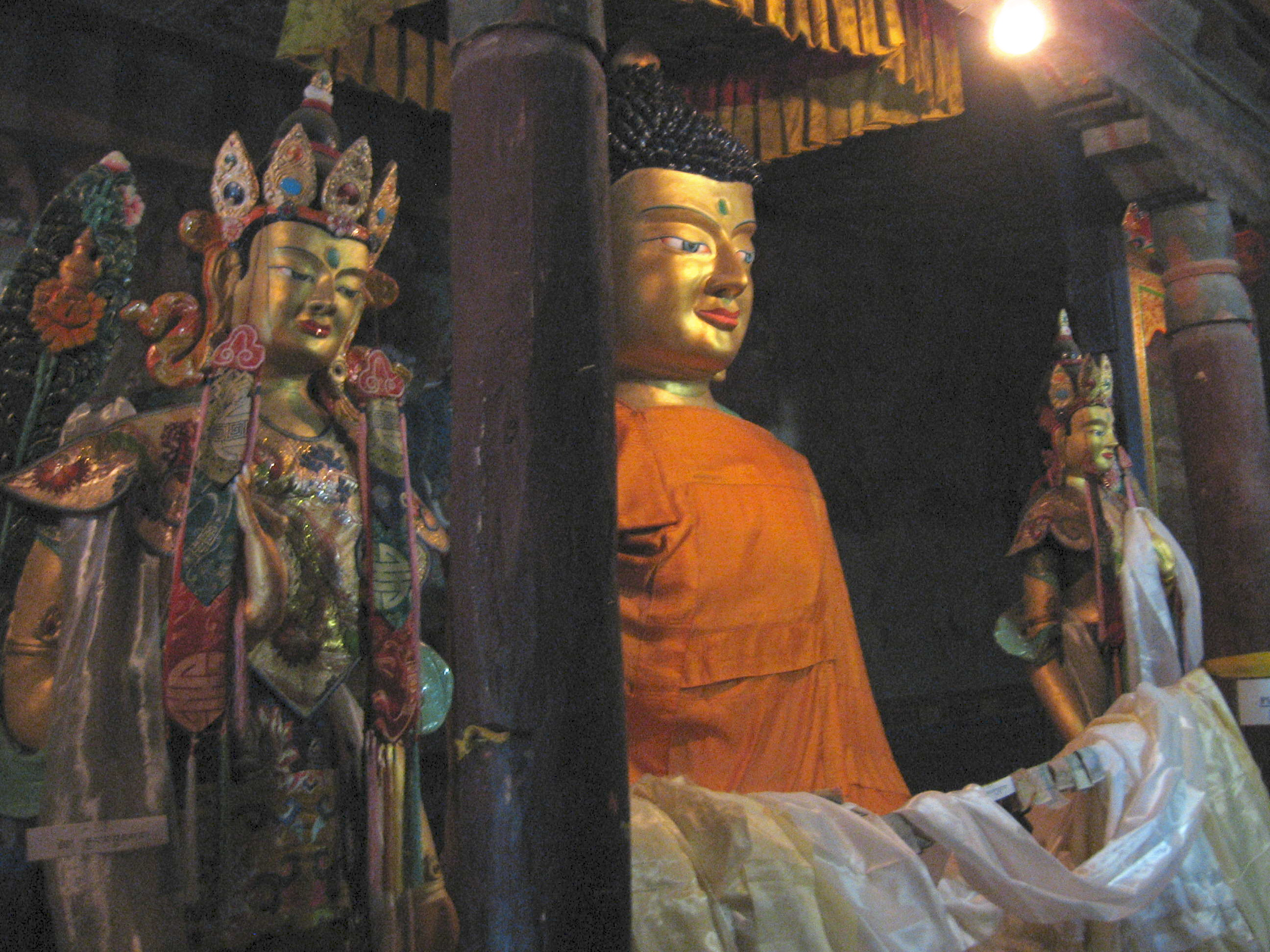
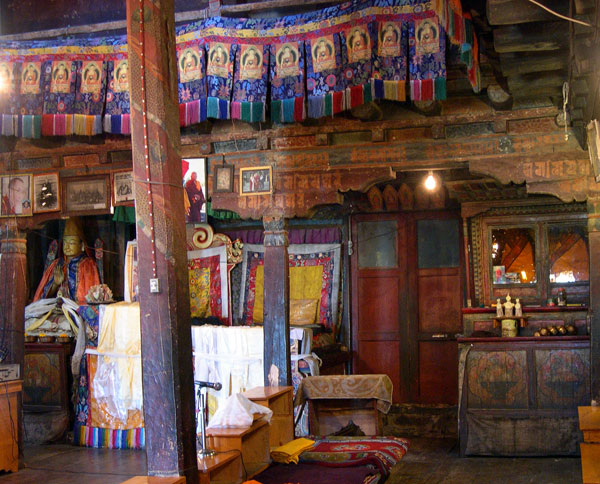
The assembly hall. Left: Buddha in inner sanctum. Right: Throne of Dalai lama and head lama.

The main prayer room next to this wall has many handwritten and painted books. Behind this prayer hall is the small inner sanctum of Gautama Buddha flanked by bodhisattvas, Mañjuśrī to the right and Maitreya to the left. The assembly hall also has an image of the Thousand-armed Avalokiteśvara with Padmasambhava. The centre of the assembly hall has a seat for the Dalai Lama and to its right, for the head lama and to its left, another deity is pictured. The hall also has murals of the deities Mahakala and Sitātapatrā. Stored on wooden shelves in the hall are 225 volumes of the Tengyur, wrapped in silk.

=== Tara temple ===
A temple is also dedicated to goddess Tara with her 21 images placed in glass-covered wooden shelves. Also, small shrines devoted to several guardian divinities including Cham-spring - the protector deity of Thikse - can also be seen between the main courtyard and the staircase. The Chi-khang has an image of the Buddha with two of his disciples and the deity Yamantaka. The courtyard mural depicts Tsong Khapa, the Buddha, Padmasambhava, Palden Lhamo and Mahakala.

=== Lamokhang temple and quarters ===
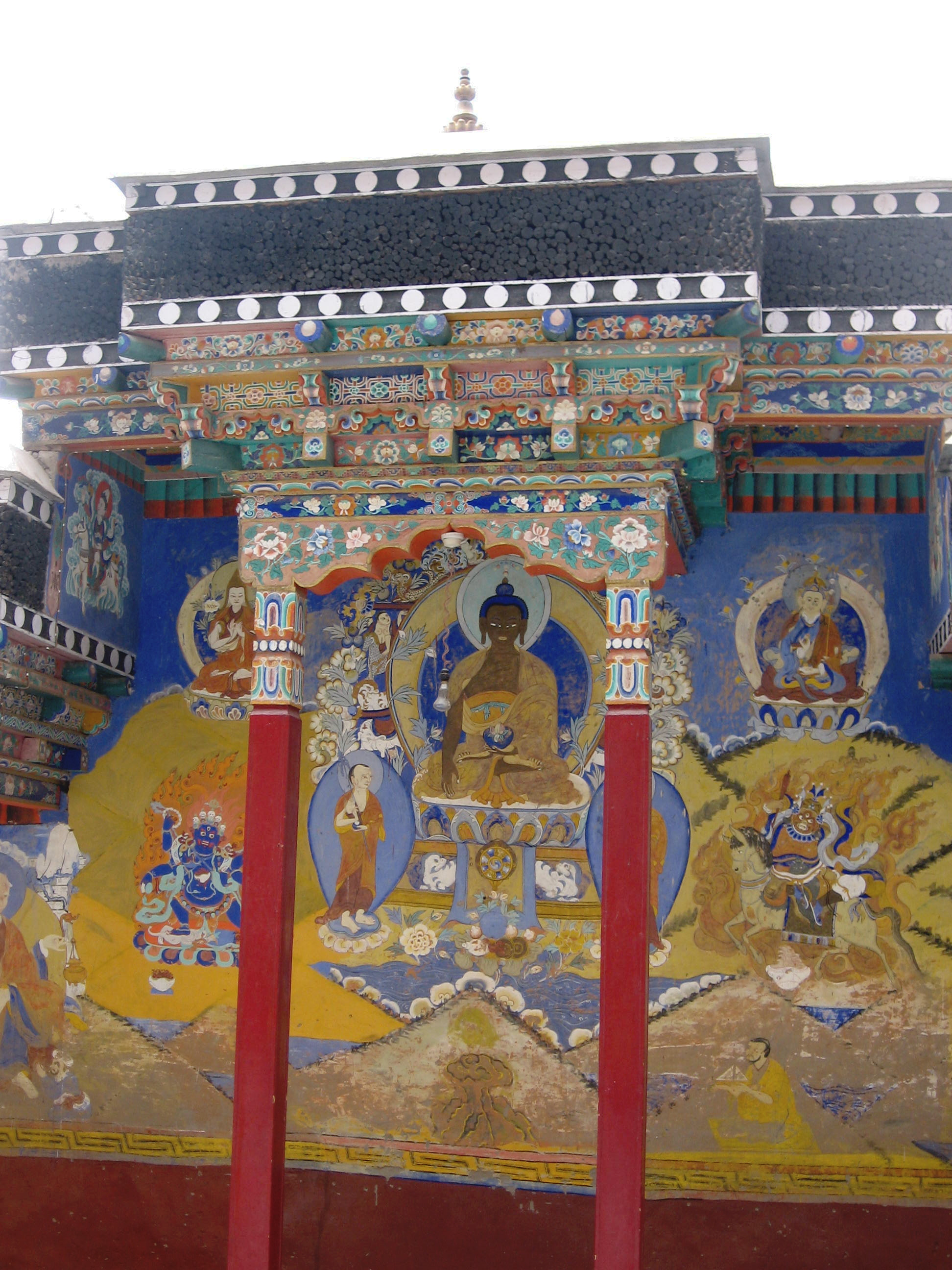
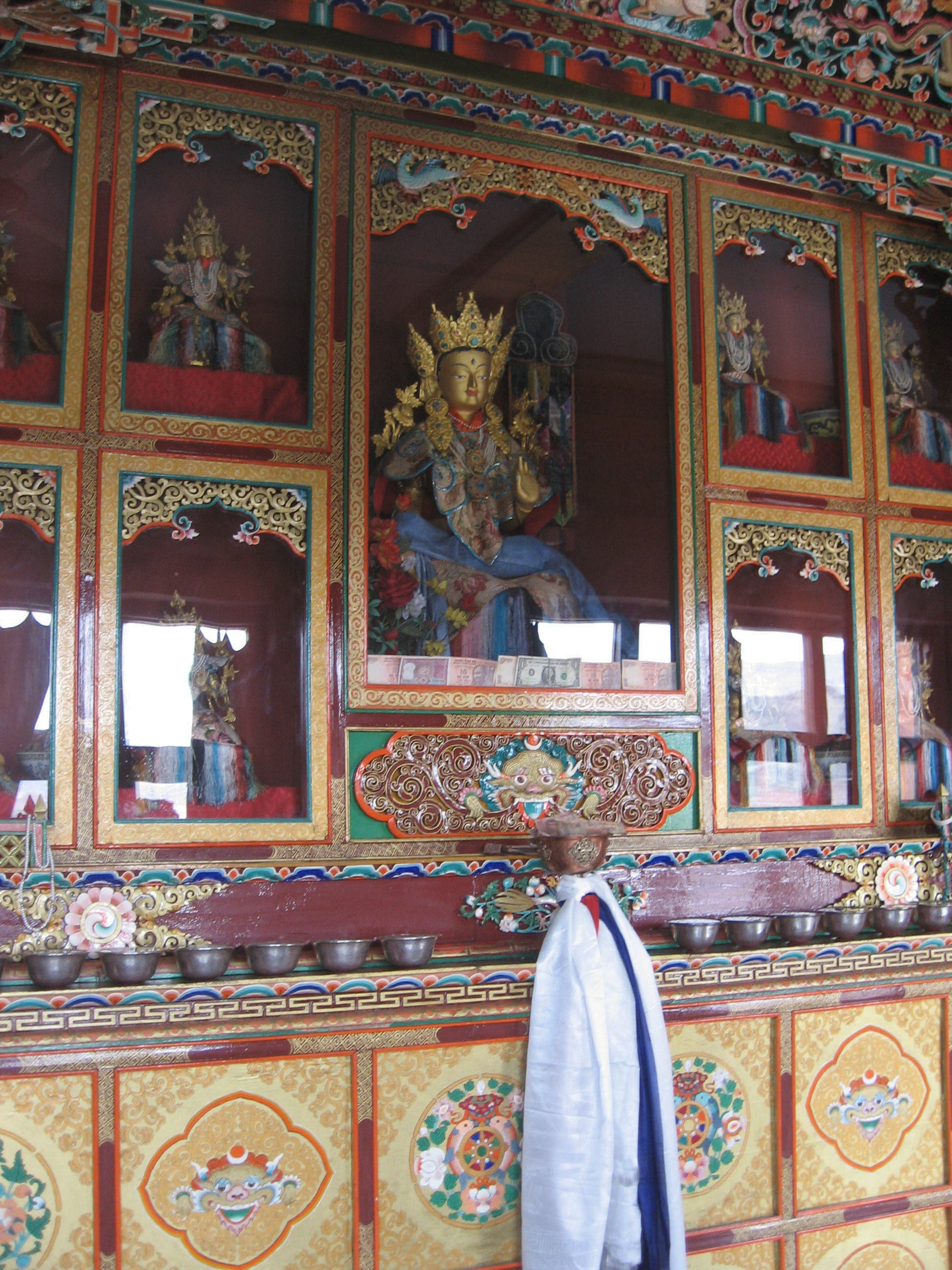
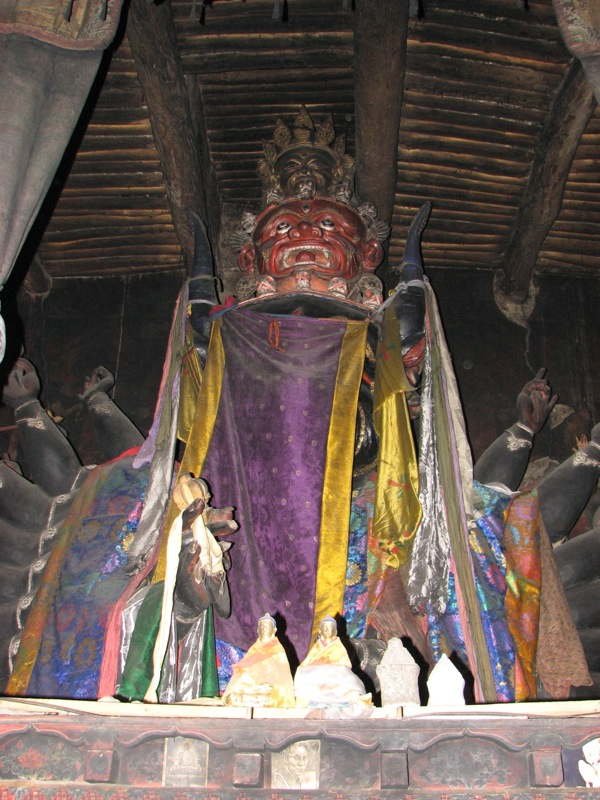
Courtyard mural (left), Tara shrine (centre), Protector deity shrine (right)

The top floor of the monastery houses the Lamokhang temple, which is a repository of numerous volumes of scriptures including Kangyur and Stangyur. Only men are allowed to enter this floor. There are big stupas and mani walls at the entry to the monastery. A small room above the temple is exclusively used as a schoolroom to teach local boys of the villages and some of these boys are chosen as lamas. The top floor is also the official residence of the incarnate lama of the monastery. A large pillar engraved with the Buddha's teachings is also located here. The monastery complex has a number of white washed huts, which house the lamas.

== Nyerma Nunnery ==
Nyerma Nunnery
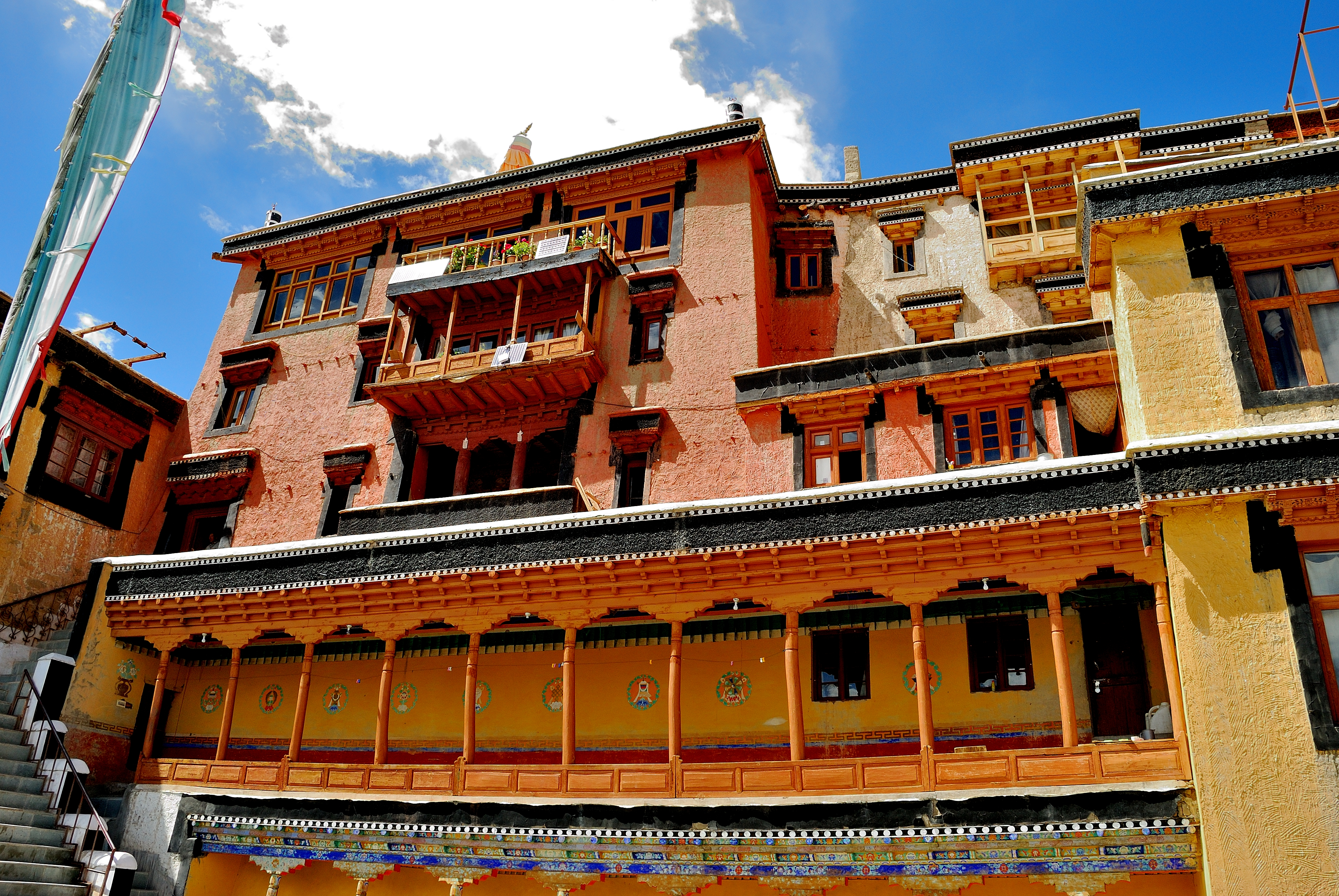

- Location within Kashmir region

Religion
- Affiliation: Tibetan Buddhism
- Sect: Gelug
- Leadership: Padma Dechen

Location
- Location: Nyerma, Ladakh, India
- Coordinates: 34.03906°N 77.68427°E

The nunnery or the school for the community of nuns is located within the precincts of the monastery and is managed by the monastery administration. In Ladakh, nunneries were held in a grossly inferior status and Buddhist nuns in particular lived in appalling conditions. In the 1990s, awareness was raised on the status of the nuns in Ladakh, and Thiksey received a degree of international attention and support. In 1995, the Sakyadhita Conference of Buddhist Women was held in Leh, leading to the establishment of the Ladakh Nuns Association in 1996. This was important in raising the status of the nuns in Ladakh, to ensure a shift in their functional role of "servitude and to one of true spiritual practice". The Chief Lama, Thiksey Rinpoche of Thiksey Monastery was also important in these positive developments in the betterment of nuns. The monastery donated the land for a new nunnery at Nyerma, near Thiksey, at the same place where the very first monastic seat was established by Rinchen Zangpo, the Tibetan translator, in the tenth century. The nunnery is now under the patronage of Thiksey Monastery.

Today the nunnery houses 26 nuns, ranging from the ages of 43 to 87. The nuns themselves had taken steps to assert their position in the society by changing their traditional name of 'ani' (literal meaning "aunt" – a derogatory connotation of a servant) to "cho-mos", the "female religious practitioners". They even adopted the testament of Mahaprajapati on this issue, expressed by Buddha's aunt and nun as their anthem. Under the influence of the 14th Dalai Lama's words, Thiksey Rinpoche Nawang Jamyang Chamba Stanzin and Tsultrim Tharchin, a geshe became nuns' activists at Thiksey. The Dutch Foundation for Ladakhi Nuns (DFLN), a charitable organisation also operates in Nyerma, providing monetary and individual services to support the Buddhist nuns of Ladakh.

As of 2020, the abbess of Nyerma Nunnery was Padma Dechen.

== Festivals ==
The annual festival held in the monastery precincts is known as the Gustor ritual, which is held from the 17th to 19th day of the ninth month of the Tibetan calendar (October–November). Sacred dances such as the mask dance or Cham dance are performed as a part of this ritual. Another special feature is the trade fair held at the base of the monastery, in which villagers from all over Ladakh assemble to barter and trade items and socialize. Sand mandalas are made for smaller festivals. The morning prayers at 07:00, with synchronized chanting of sūtras at this monastery, attract many worshippers to the services.

== See also ==
- List of buddhist monasteries in Ladakh
- Geography of Ladakh
- Tourism in Ladakh
