= Gutor =

Gutor may refer to:

- Hamuliakovo, a village and municipality in Bratislava Region, Slovakia
- Gustor Festival, a Tibetan Buddhist festival celebrated in Ladakh monasteries

Gutor (Cyrillic: Гутор) is an Eastern Slavic surname:

- Aleksei Gutor
- Alyaksandr Hutar
