= Ladakh Buddhist Association =

1933 Ladakh-based Indian organization

- Ladakh Nangpay Tsoksdus
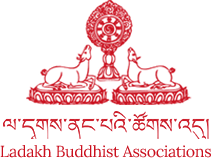
- Ladakh Buddhist Association
- Abbreviation: LBA
- Successor: Thupstan Chhewang, former MP
- Formation: 1934
- Founders: King Jigmet Dadul Namgyal; Kalon Tsewang Rigzin; Lachumir Munshi Sonam Tsewang; Kalon Bankapa Murup Gyaltsan; Pandit Sridhar Koul
- Type: Socio-Religious / Charitable
- Purpose: Maintaining peace and stability in Ladakh region
- Headquarters: Leh, India
- Location: Chokhang Vihar, main market, Leh
- Region served: Ladakh, India
- Members: 24356
- Official language: Bhoti, English
- Vice President: Chering Dorjay, former MP and Dr. Tsewang Yangjor
- Key people: President Thupstan Chhewang Vice President Tsering Dorjey Lakrook
- Subsidiaries: LBA Youth Wing
- Affiliations: Buddhist Society of India
- Website: Official Website Official handle

Ladakh Buddhist Association (LBA) is an organization in Ladakh, India concerned with interests of Buddhists in Ladakh. It was founded in 1933 by King Jigmet Dadul Namgyal, Kalon Tsewang Rigzin, Lachumir Munshi Sonam Tsewang and Kalon Bankapa Morup Gyaltsan and Pandit Sridhar Koul, also known as Pandit Dulu, after the Glancy Commission failed to provide representation to Ladakhi Buddhists in the newly proposed Praja Sabha. The initiative led to the establishment of the Young Men's Buddhist Association (YMBA) in 1934, which was later renamed as the Ladakh Buddhist Association.

== Objectives ==
It has the aim of looking after the Buddhist interests, bringing social reforms in Ladakhi society and to preserve its art, culture, language and tradition.

== Organisation ==
The association was formed in 1934.

The LBA consists of the Parent Department, the Youth Wing and the Women's Wing and branches located in villages that are meant to address local issues and look after the welfare of Buddhist Community. LBA has its unit branch offices in the outreach representing a cluster of villages. These units facilitate and work closely with the community heads and their own village representatives as well as their women and youth groups.

In 2021, Thupstan Chhewang was elected as the leader of Ladakh Buddhist Association.

== Post-independence history ==
Following the accession of Jammu and Kashmir to India in 1947 and the discussions with the United Nations regarding a plebiscite to determine the final disposition of the state, Chewang Rigzin, the President of the Ladakh Buddhist Association wrote to the Prime Minister Jawaharlal Nehru asking for it to be excluded from such arrangements. He argued that Ladakh was a "separate nation" by all tests, such as race, language and culture, and had a right to self-determination. He suggested that Ladakh should be governed directly by the Government of India or merged with Jammu or East Punjab. Nehru urged him not to raise separatist demands as they might weaken India's stand on Kashmir in the United Nations.

After this, the LBA turned to demanding internal autonomy within the state of Jammu and Kashmir. It made various demands such as the set-up of a Ladakh Affairs Ministry headed by a Ladakhi MLA, adequate representation in legislature and civil service, development funds for roads and bridges etc. Some of the demands were accepted, but others were not because they were opposed by the Kargil Action Committee in Kargil The autonomy demand was rejected in the 1980s on the grounds that it did not have support in Kargil.

The onset of armed militancy in the Kashmir Valley in 1989, with strong Islamist overtones, convinced many Buddhists in Leh that their future was uncertain in Jammu and Kashmir. The question of regional autonomy now began to be framed in communal terms, as a Muslim-Buddhist conflict. A scuffle between a Buddhist youth and some Muslims in July 1989 provoked a major agitation in Leh, spreading to other parts of the Leh district. A strong crack-down by the Jammu and Kashmir Armed Police with allegations of human rights abuses, led LBA to launch a violent struggle demanding a Union Territory status for Ladakh.

From 1989 to 1992, the LBA initiated a boycott against Ladakh's Muslim as a way to express their grievances toward the Kashmiri government despite the fact that Ladakh's Muslims differed from the Muslims Kashmiris and even each other. Buddhists were restricted from having any social or economic contacts with Muslims in pain of being threatened by violence or fined. In 1989, there were violent riots between Buddhists and Muslims in Leh, caused by increasing economic and political resentment felt by Buddhists. The LBA announced a social and economic boycott of local Muslims. The boycott undermined the positive relationships between the two communities. However, due to strong links between the Muslim and Buddhist community, many Buddhists ignored the orders and continued to interact with Muslims. The boycott was lifted after the LBA and the Indian government agreed on creating an Autonomous Hill Council for Ladakh.

In early 2000, representatives of the LBA claimed that many Buddhist women were taken forcibly from their home villages and forced to convert to Islam, and accused the state government in Jammu and Kashmir of allowing this to happen.

Researchers have noted that the LBA has been allying with the RSS, BJP, and other Hindu nationalist groups since the late 20th century. This has been due to Buddhists calling for the political autonomy of Ladakh and feeling marginalized by the Kashmiri government, issues the allied groups also support. However, these alliances were made for mainly political and socio-economic reasons as Ladakhi Buddhists are also wary of the influence of these groups on their community. Martijn van Beek has considered the rhetoric of portions of the LBA and their leaders to have grown more communal and "saffronised" in part because of the role Ladakh plays in the Kashmir conflict and the LBA's advocacy for the autonomy of Ladakh. Beek summarised the situation as such: "Thus, while the LBA and some Buddhist political leaders may be willing to share a platform with the sangh parivar to promote their agenda for Union Territory status, Hindutva as such would not appear to have much appeal in a region like Ladakh. Yet despite this limited appeal of Hindutva, the saffronization of education, of the media, and of public life in general are likely to strengthen even further the perceived validity and necessity of communal idioms".

The LBA has deployed rhetoric in recent years alleging that Muslims are outnumbering them and that Buddhist women are being "lured" into marrying Muslims and subsequently converting to Islam. The case of Stanzin Saldon marrying a Muslim man is set as an example of this alleged phenomena. Saldon herself responded to these claims by stating "The statement of LBA is false and concocted, an effort to suppress and threaten the rights of individual." Some local politicians and Muslim organisations also expressed concern that the LBA was trying to disturb communal harmony due to this event.

== Gallery ==
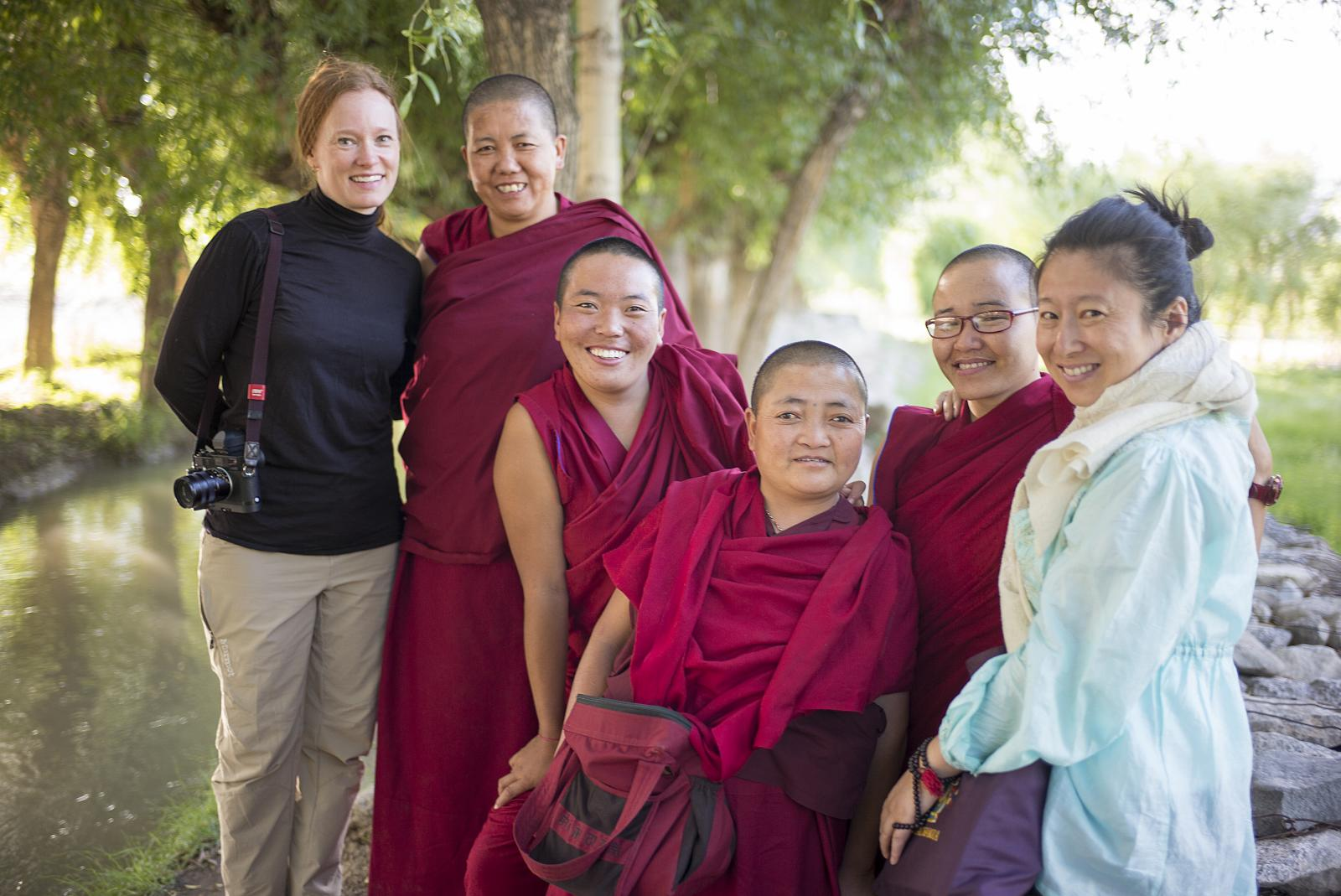
Ladakhi Buddhist monks

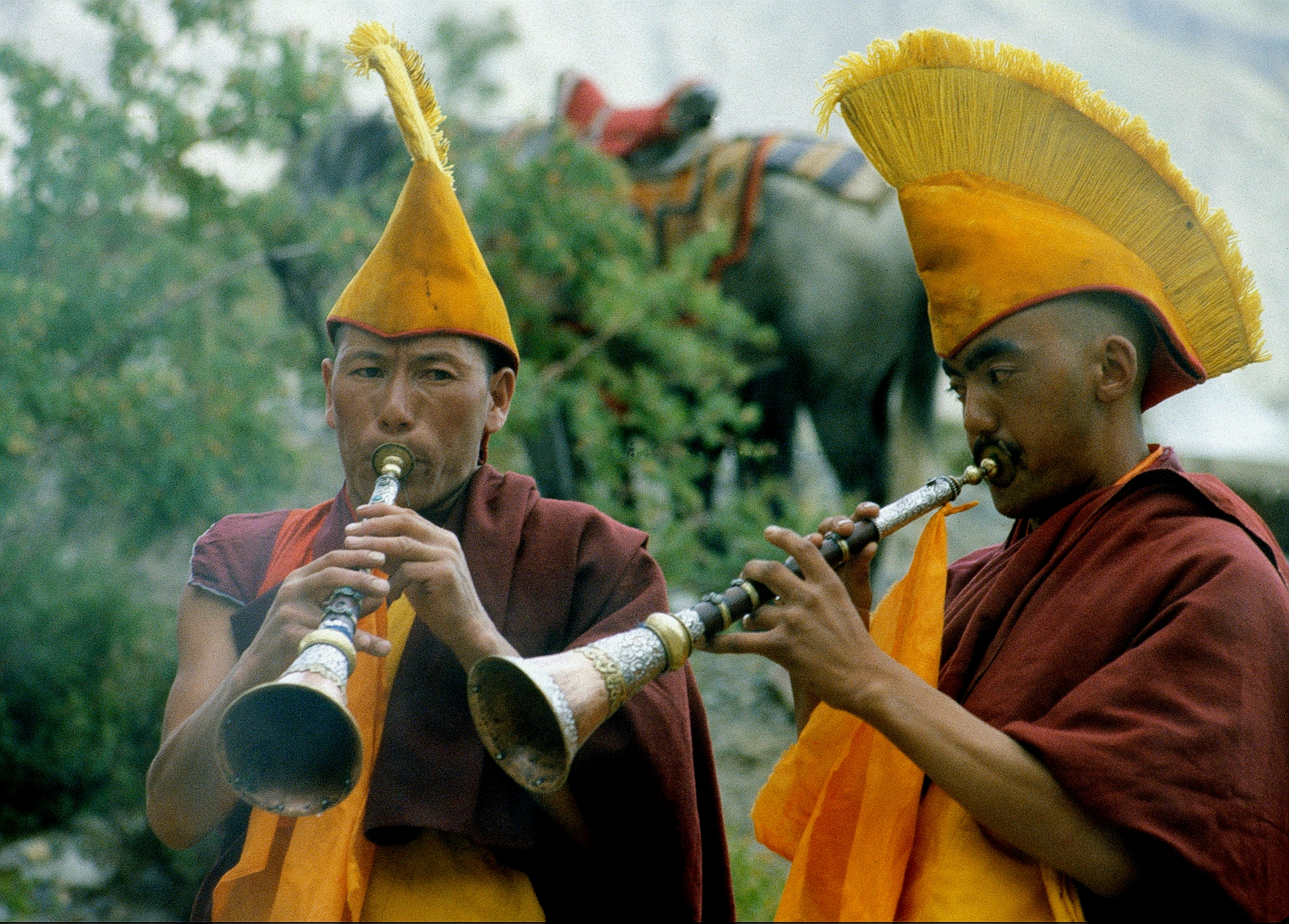
Traditional instruments

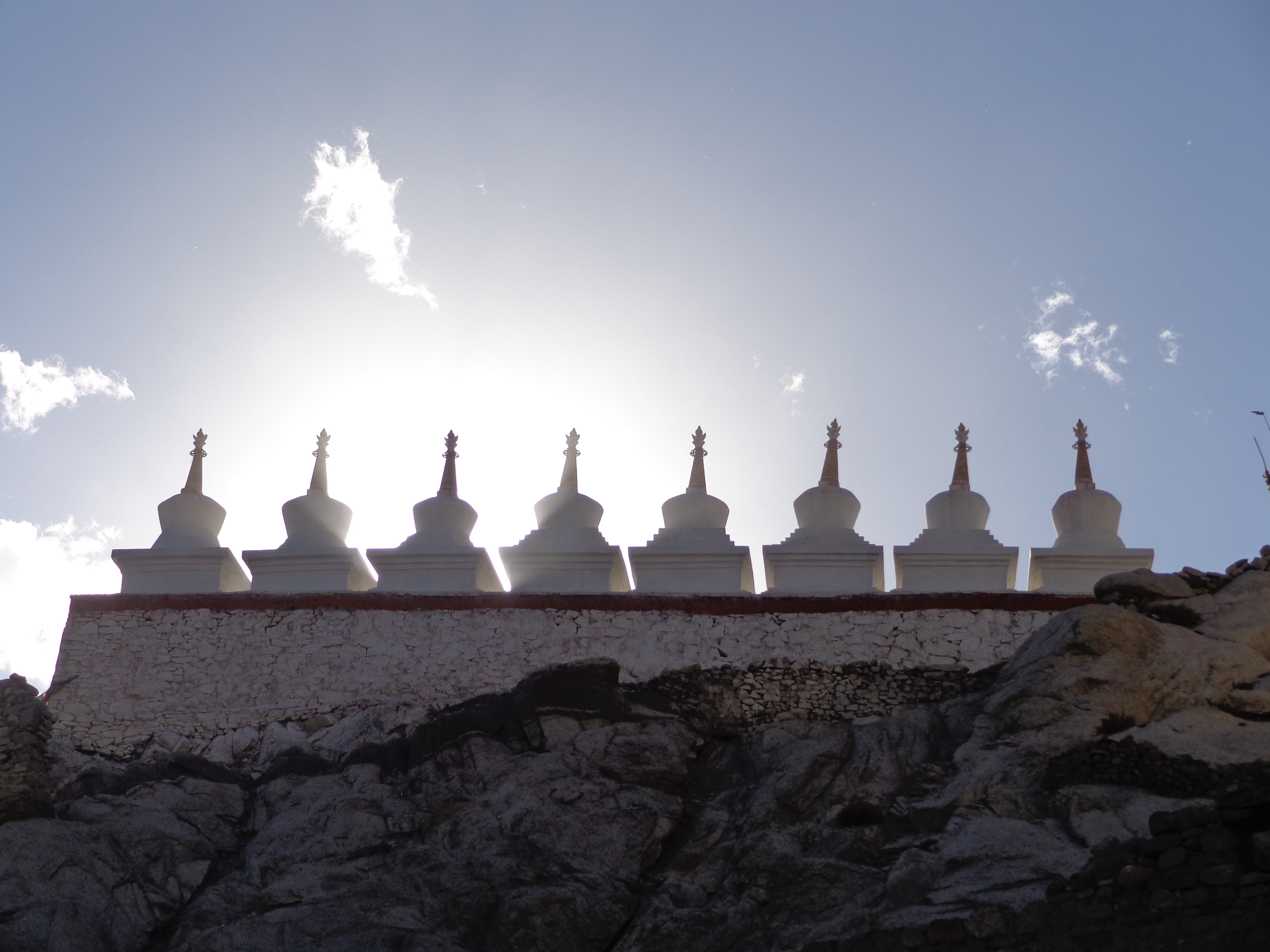
The Chortens or Buddhist Stupas at Themis Monastery, Ladakh

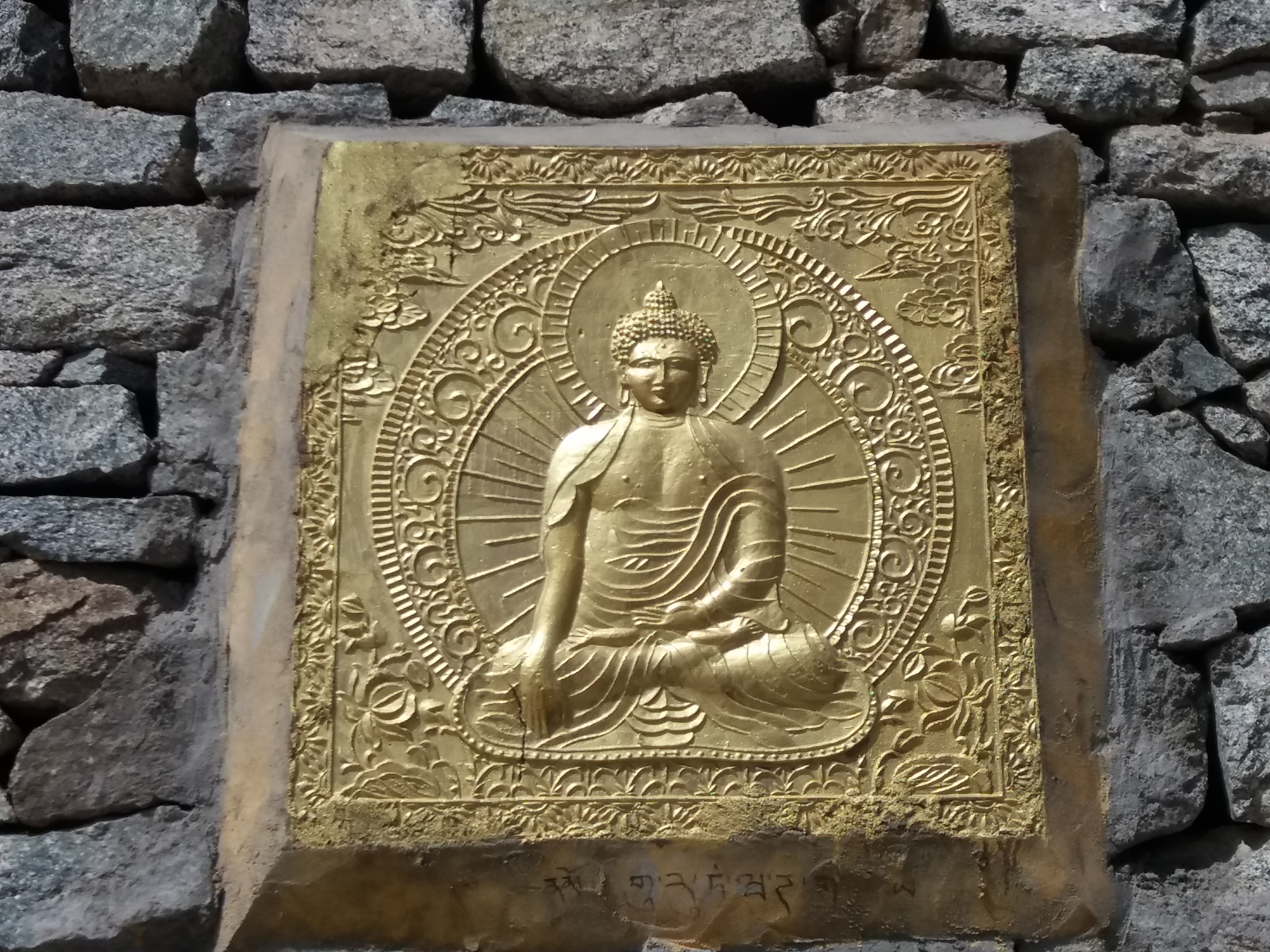
Gold Plated Buddha

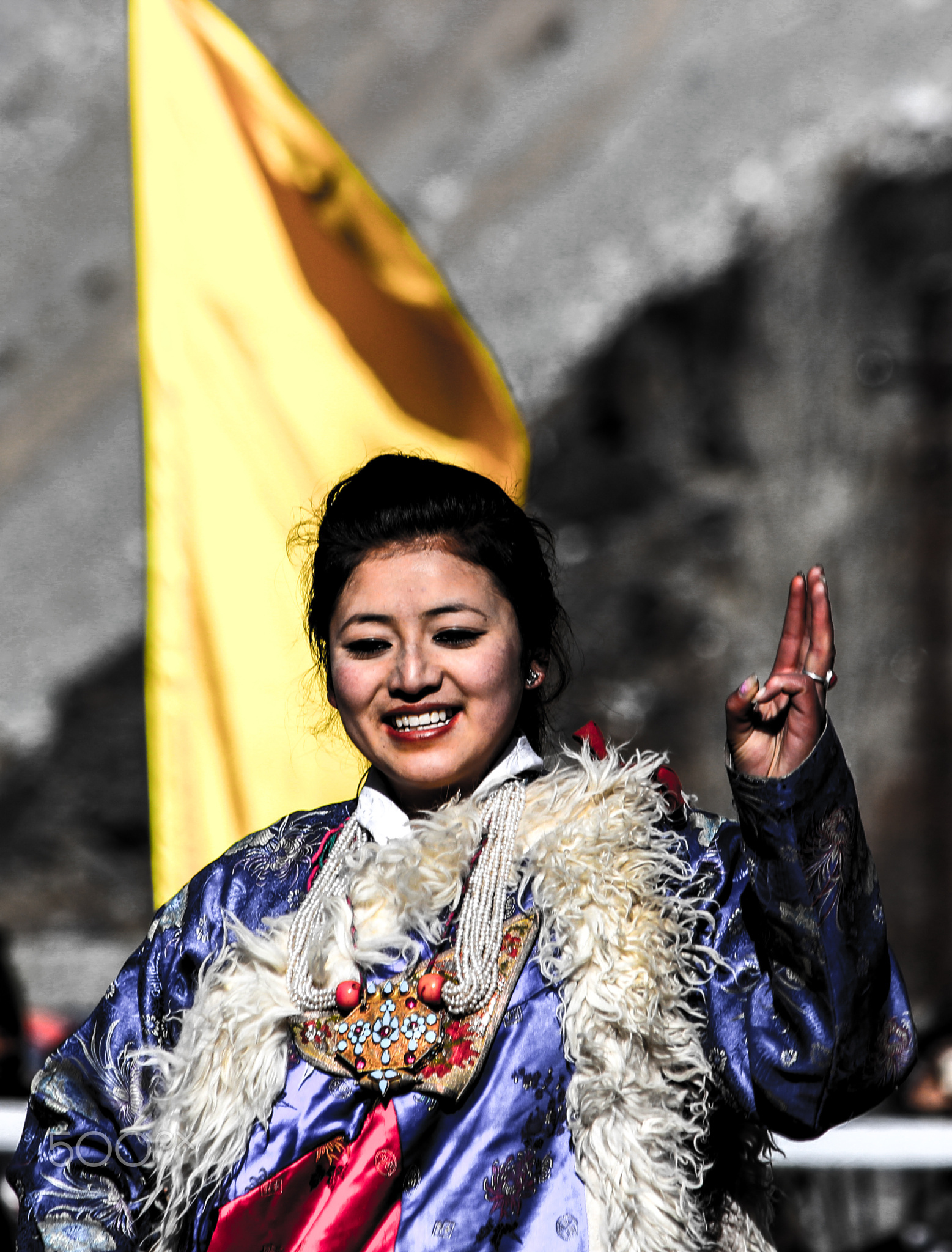
Ladakhi folk dance at Kargil

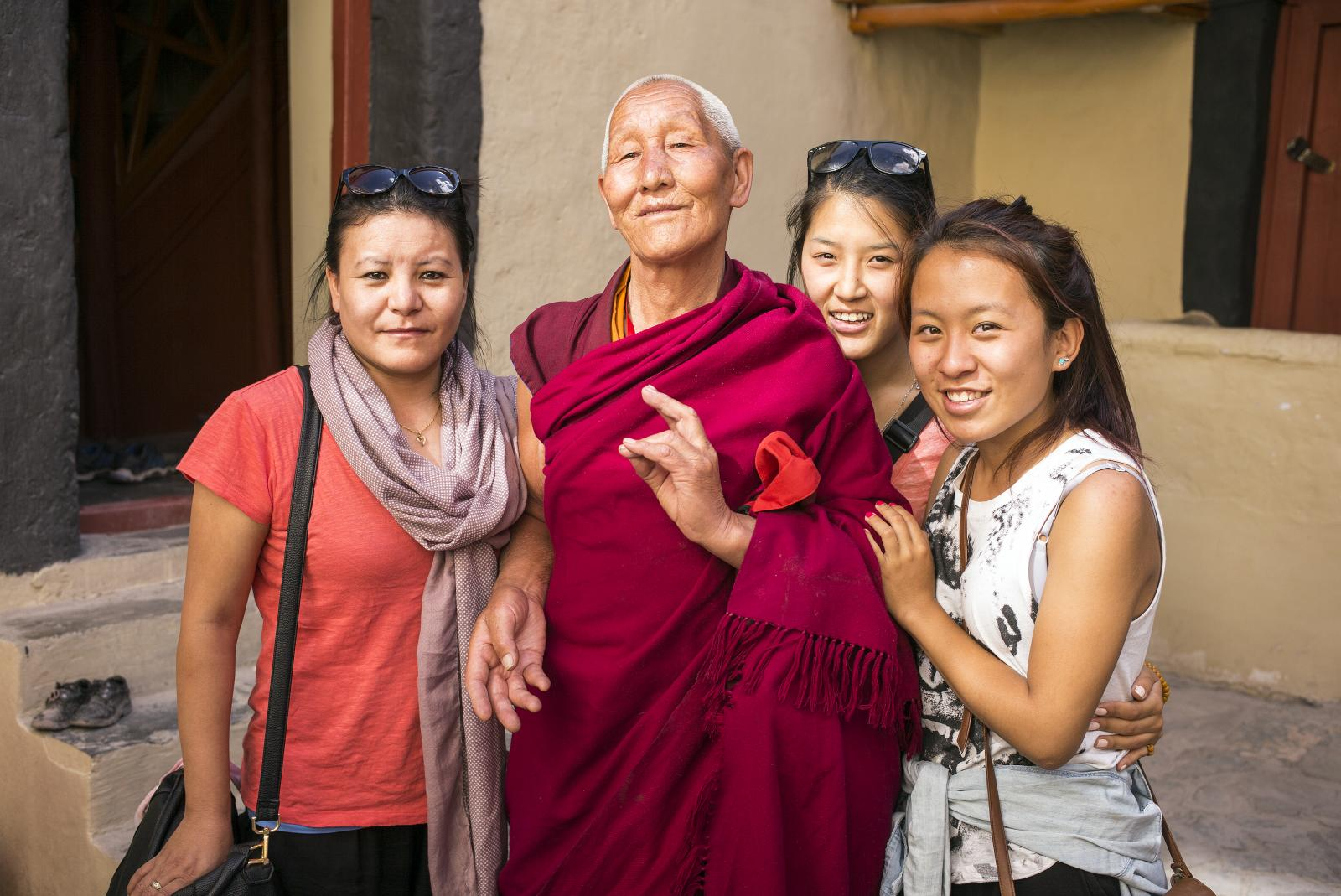
Ladakhi Buddhist nuns of Ladakh Nuns Association

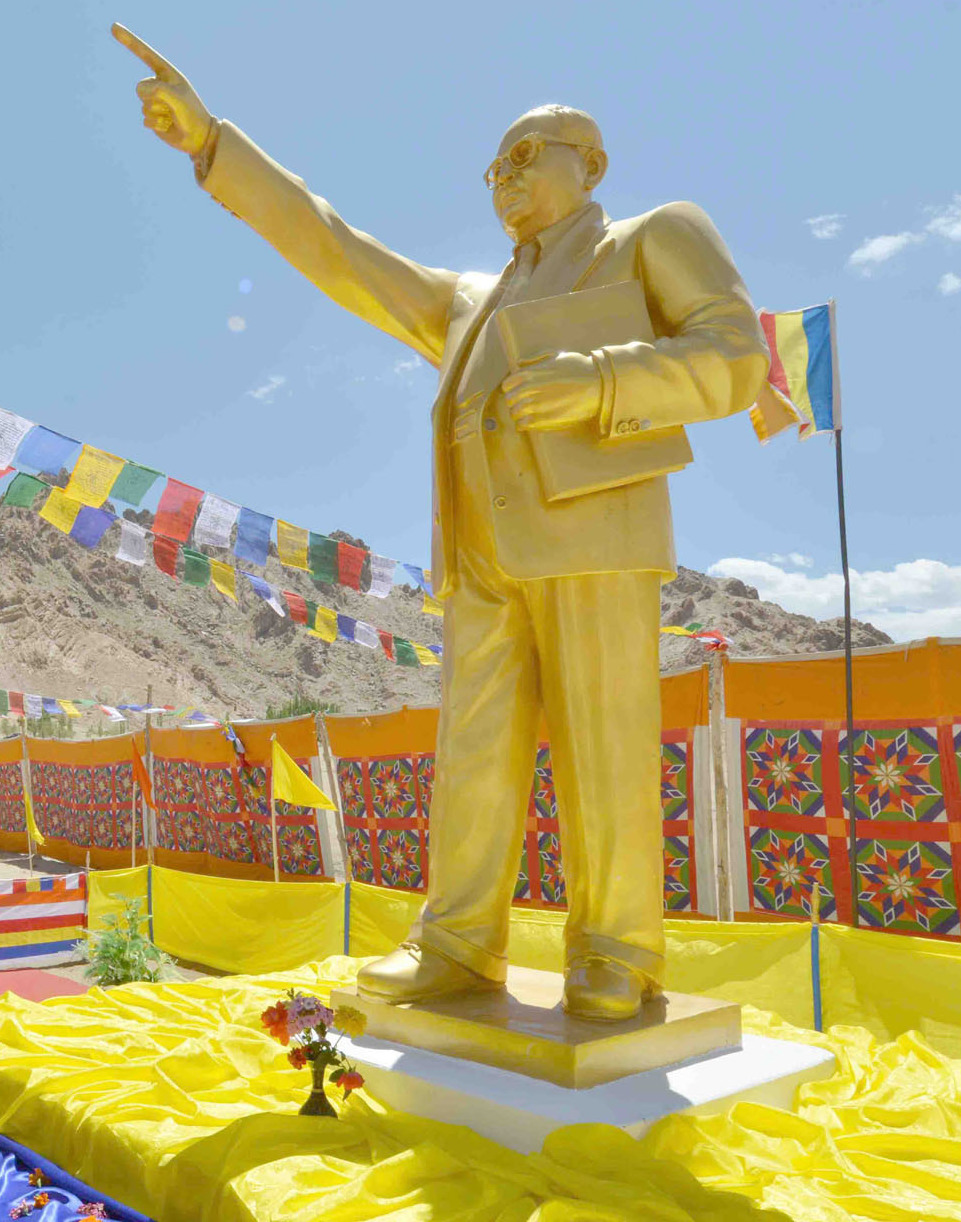
Bodhisattva B. R. Ambedkar statue at Leh

== See also ==
- Ladakh Nuns Association
- Beda people
- Politics of Ladakh

== Bibliography ==
- Sikand, Yoginder (2006), Religion, Dialogue and Peace in Jammu and Kashmir (PDF), WISCOMP: Foundation for Universal Responsibility
- Smith, Sara H. (2009), "The Domestication of Geopolitics: Buddhist-Muslim Conflict and the Policing of Marriage and the Body in Ladakh, India", Geopolitics, 14 (2): 197–218, doi:10.1080/14650040802693382, S2CID 144100071
