= Gustor Festival =

Gustor festival
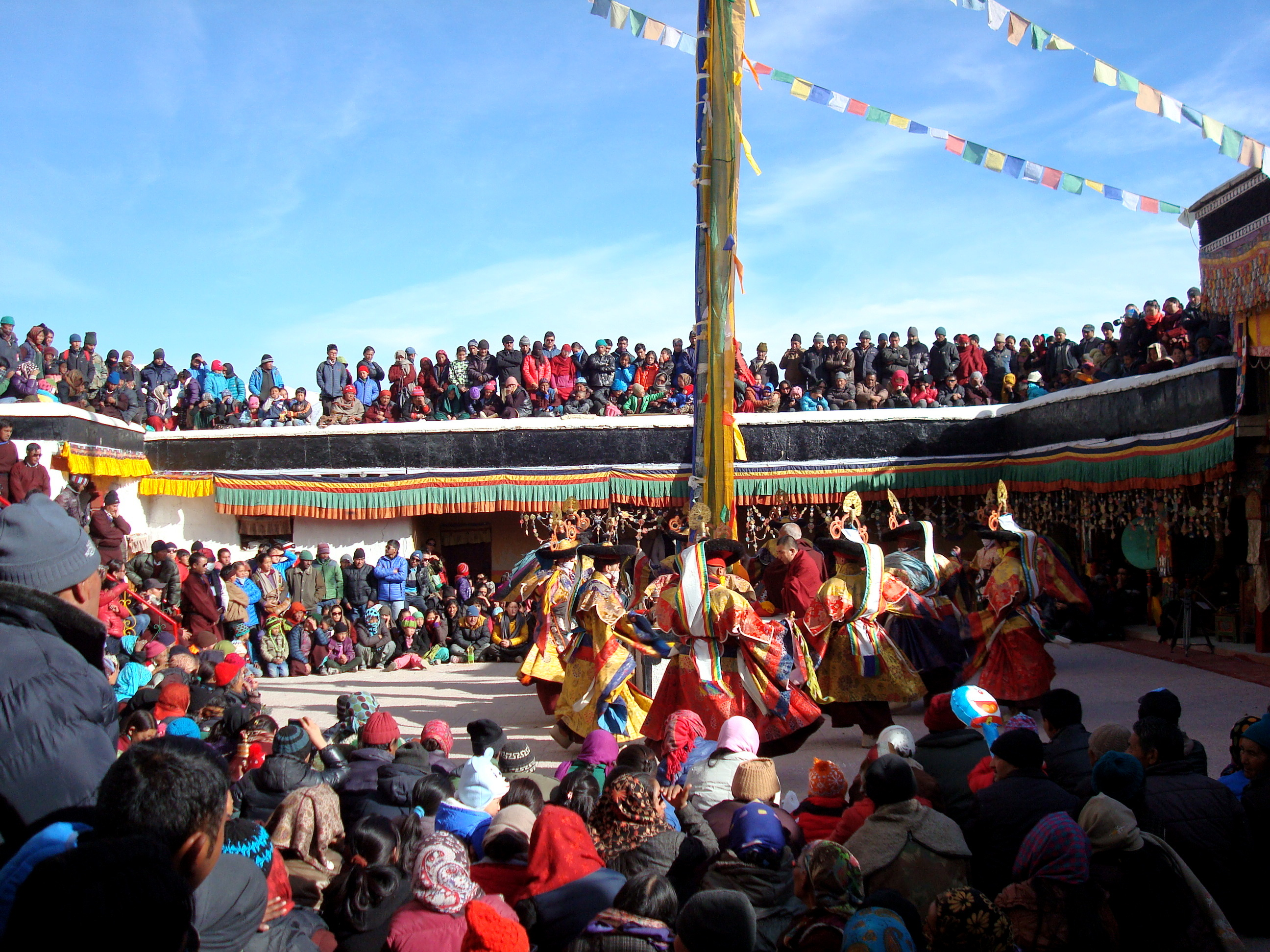
- Cham dance during Spituk Gustor 2018 in Spituk Monastery
- Observed by: Buddhists
- Type: Religious festival New year Commemoration
- Significance: being celebrated for peace and prosperity in the coming Ladakhi New year
- Begins: February
- Ends: February
- Date: 28th and 29th day of the 11th month of the Tibetan lunar calendar every year
- Duration: 2 days
- Frequency: Annual

Gustor festival is celebrated in different monasteries of Ladakh. It is celebrated by various monasteries such as Thiksey, Spituk, Korzok and Karsha. The word Gustor དགུ་གཏོར / དགུ་སྟོར literally means 'Sacrifice of the 29th Day' in the Tibetan language. The festival is celebrated for two days, with different kinds of rituals, ceremonies, music & Cham Dance.

== Thikse Gustor Festival ==
Thikse Gustor Festival in Thikse Monastery is held on the month of (October–November) which is held from the 17th to 19th day of the ninth month of the Tibetan calendar.

== Korzok Gustor Festival ==
Korzok Gustor Festival in Korzok Monastery is held on the month of July. Many Chang-pa, the Tibetan plateau nomadic herdsmen are attracted to this festival. In Korzok Gustor festival, Lama dancers wear masks to represent the Dharmapalas. Dharmapalas are guardian divinities of the Buddhist pantheon. They are the patron divinities of the Drukpa sect of Tibetan Buddhism.

== Karsha Gustor Festival ==
Karsha Gustor Festival in Karsha Monastery is held on the 27th and 28th day of the 6th Tibetan month which falls in July. Karsha (biggest Monastery in Zanskar). This festival has masked dance, quaint music and spiritual chants which continue for two days.

== Stonday Gustor Festival ==
Stonday Gustor Festival is held in the Stonday Monastery. The dates of this festival depends on the Tibetan calendar. Date varies every year but mostly in July.

== Schedule ==
Since Ladakh follows the Tibetan lunar calendar and Gustor festival comes on the 28th and 29th day of the 11 month Tibetan calendar, every year the festival falls on a different date of the Gregorian calendar.

Year	Date
2021	11–12 January
2022	30–31 January
2023	19–20 January
2024	
2025	
2026	
2027	

== Gallery ==
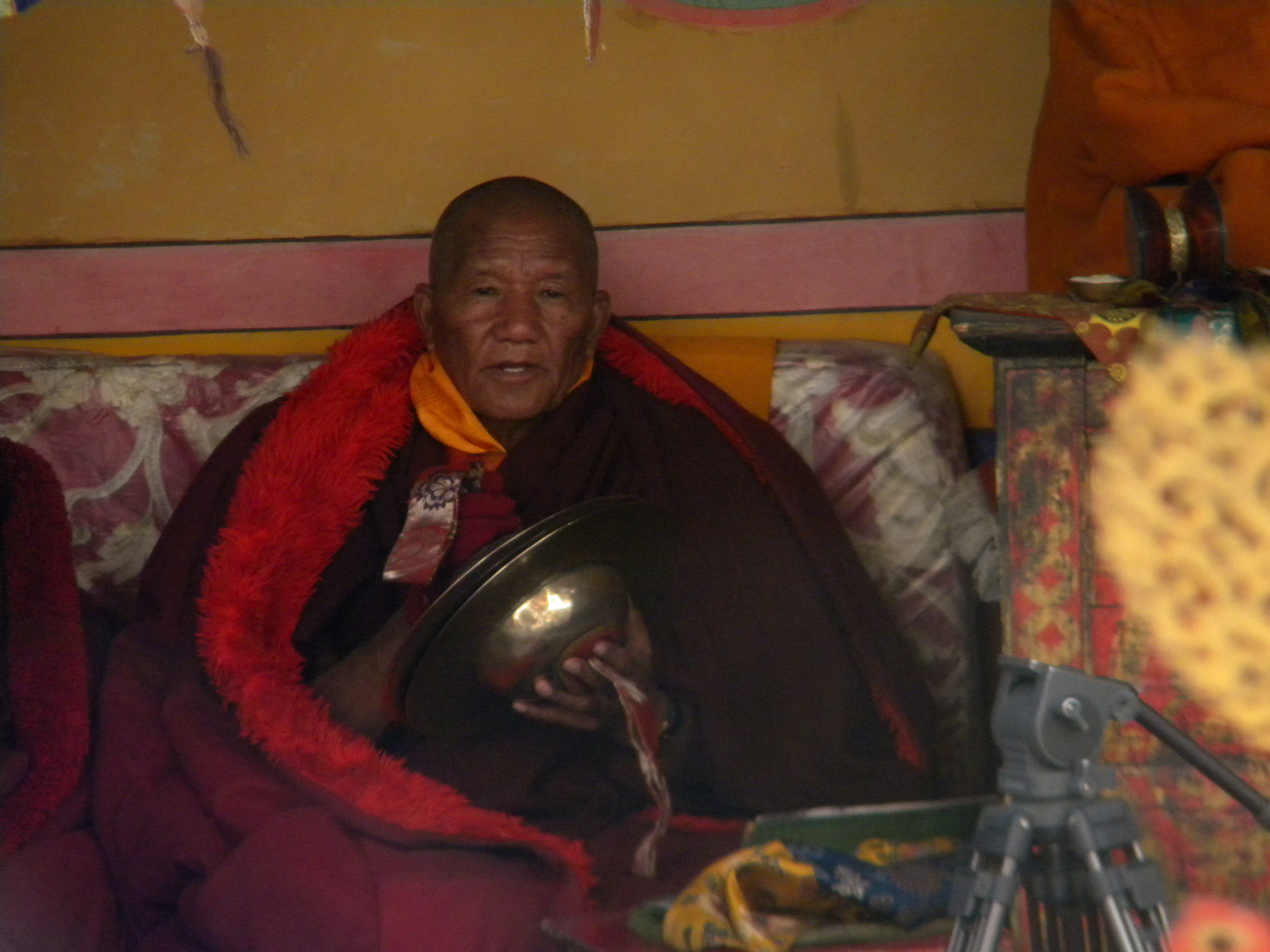
Spituk Lama with cymbals during Gustor festival

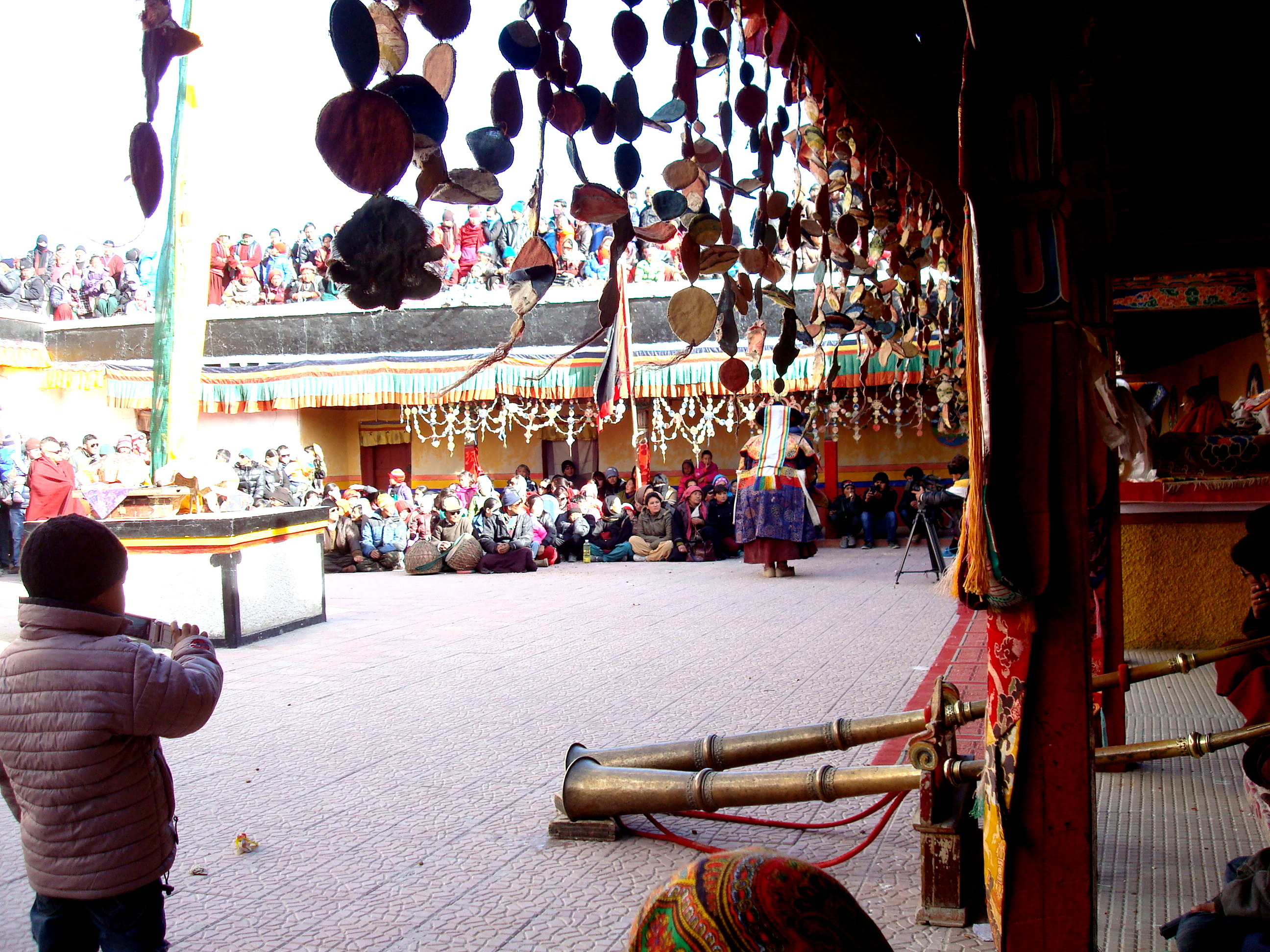
Musical instrument Tibetan horn kept on the floor during Spituk Gustor Festival in Spituk Monastery

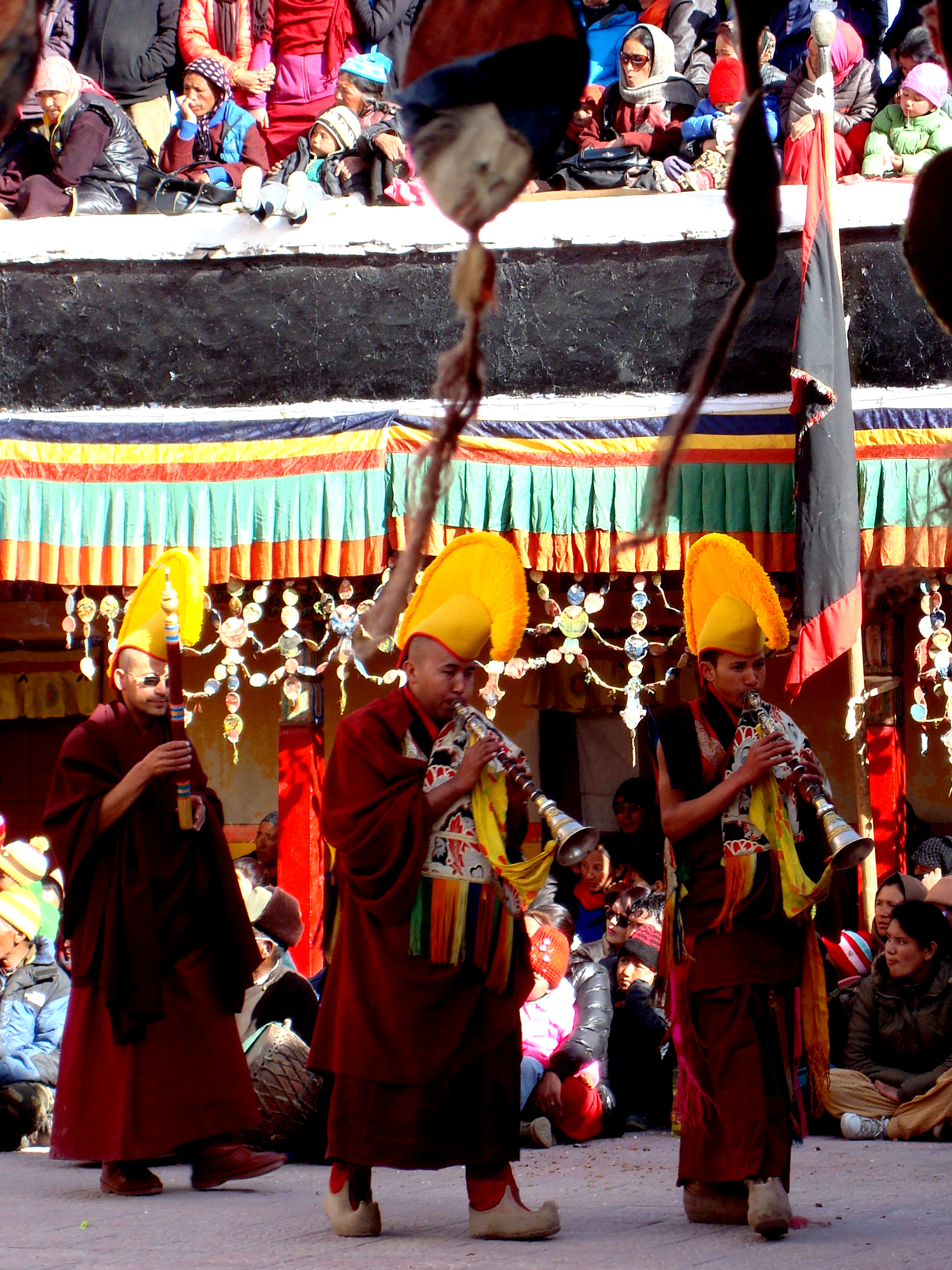
Ladakh Horn Players

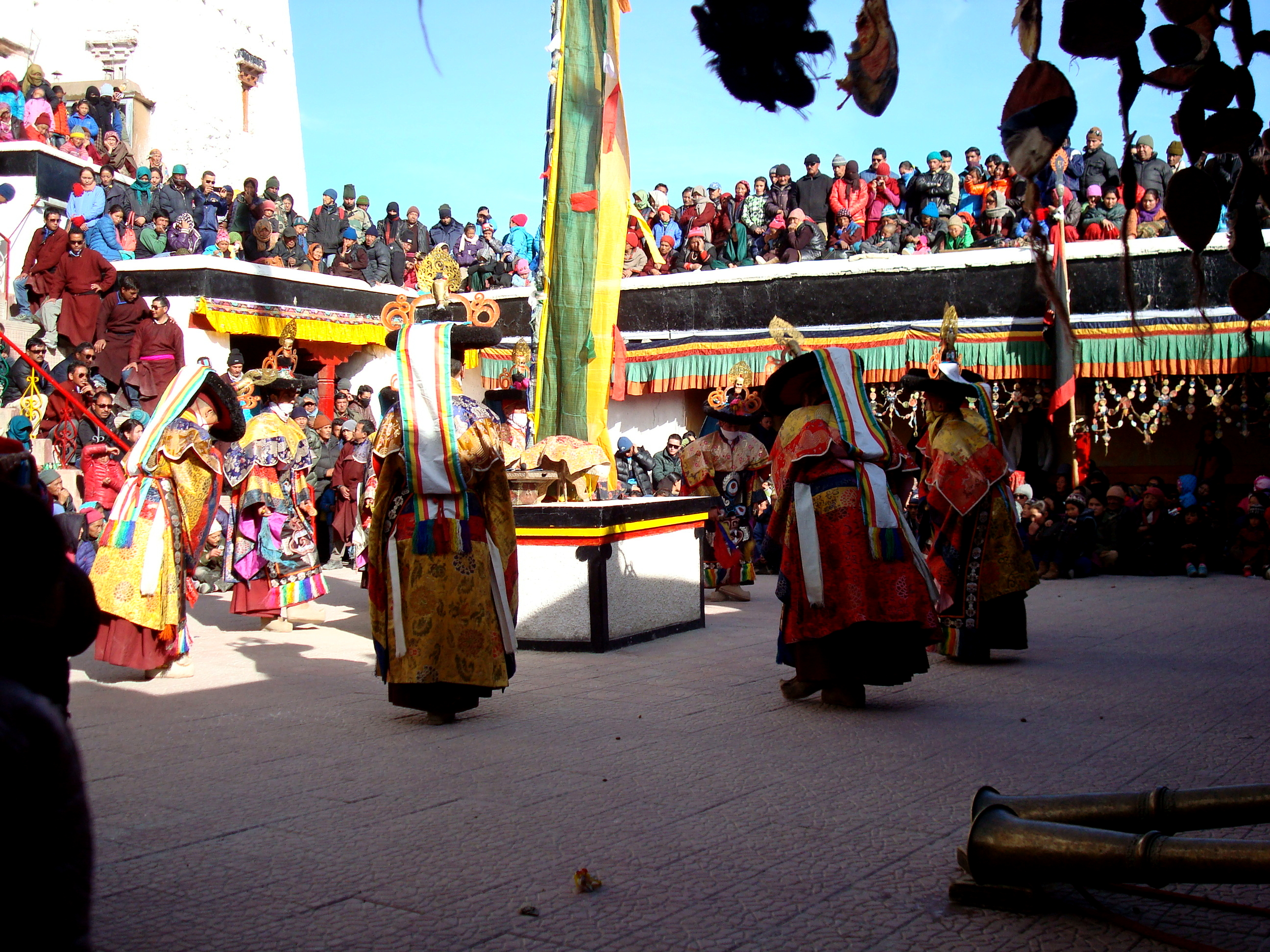
Spituk Cham Dance during Gustor festival

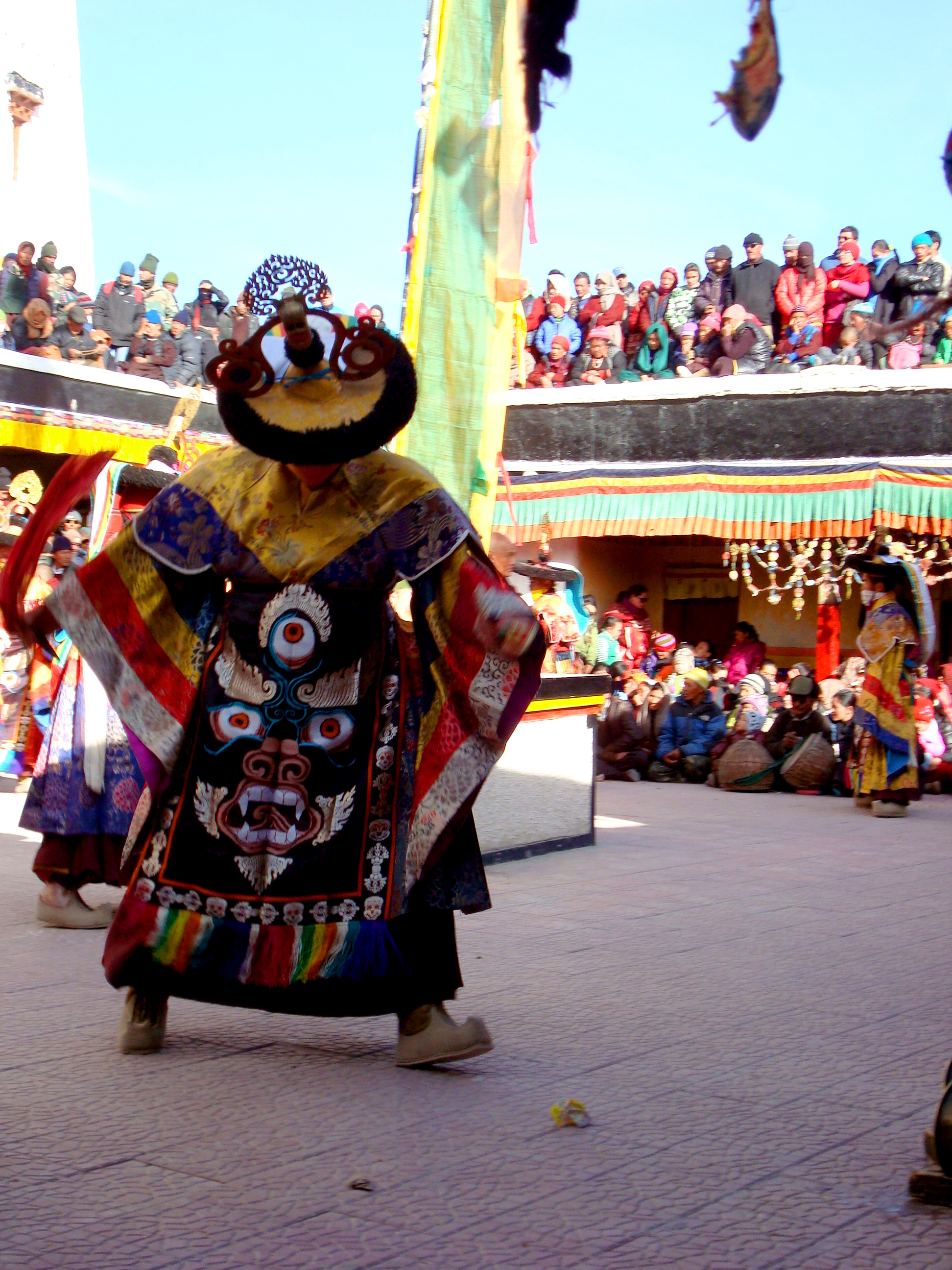
Cham Dancer

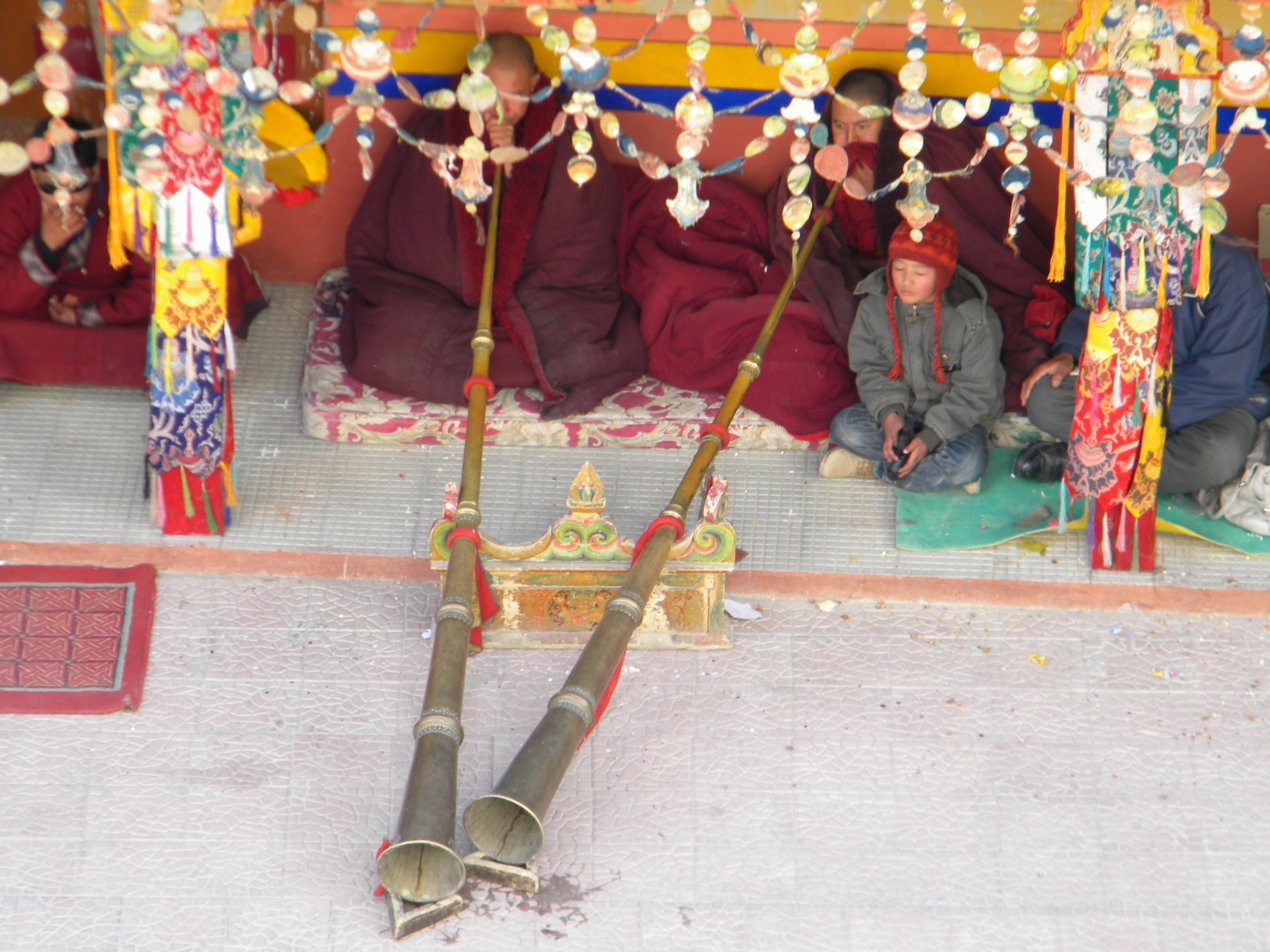
Dungchen player
