= Ladakh Nuns Association =

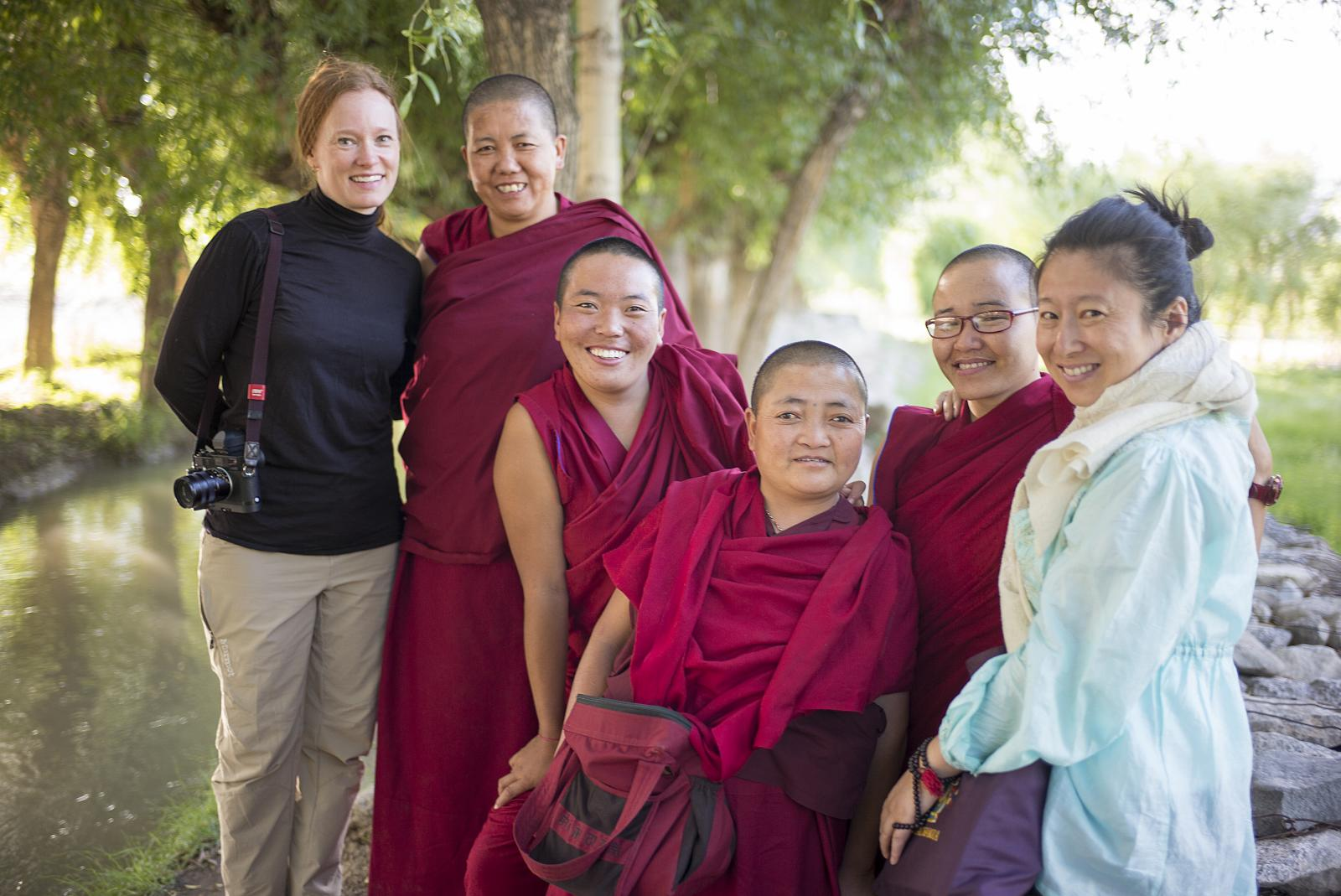
- LNA members
- Formation: 1996
- Founder: Dr. Tsering Palmo
- Legal status: Registered
- Headquarters: Leh
- Region served: Ladakh
- Official language: Bhoti
- Secretary General: Ven. Tsering Angmo
- Patron: Most Ven. Gaden Tri Redzong Sras Rinpoche
- Volunteers: 1200
- Website: ladakhnunsassociation.org

Ladakh Nuns Association (LNA) is an association of Buddhist nuns in Ladakh, India. It was founded in the year 1996 by Dr. Tsering Palmo with the aim of reviving and rejuvenating the tradition of nuns in Ladakh. It aims to raise the education level of the nuns and to give them a way to study and practice the Dharma. It was registered officially in the year 1997 under the Jammu and Kashmir Government (Under the Societies Regd. Act VI of 1998 [1941] Regn. No. 2888-S of 1997).

== See also ==
- Ladakh Buddhist Association
- Thinlas Chorol
- Nilza Wangmo
- Kung Fu Nuns
