= Spituk Monastery =

Tibetan Buddhist monastery in Spituk, Ladakh, India

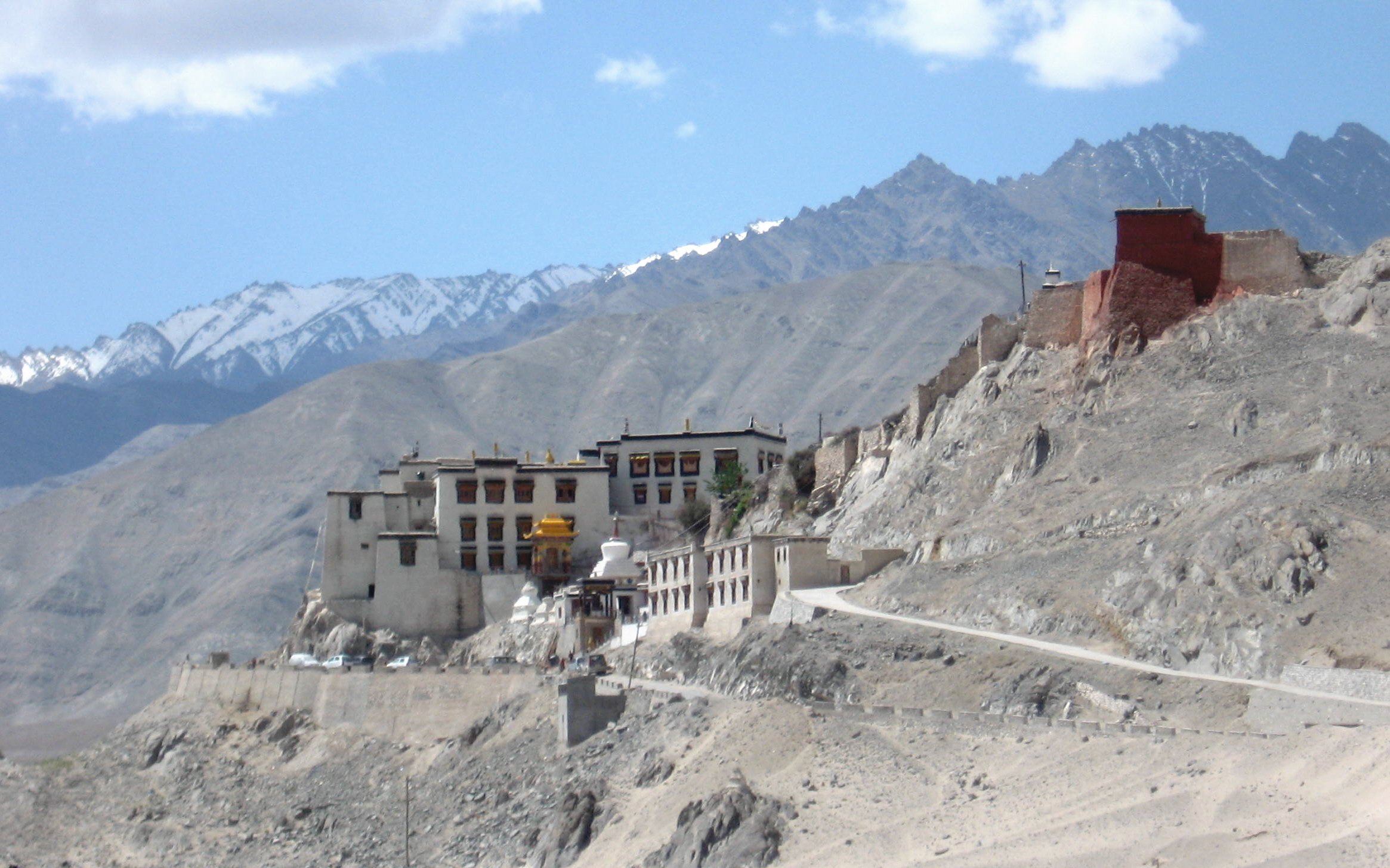

Religion
- Affiliation: Tibetan Buddhism
- Sect: Gelug
- Festival: Gustor Festival: 27-29th of the 11th month

Location
- Location: Leh district Ladakh, India
- Country: India
- Interactive map of Spituk Monastery
- Coordinates: 34°7′31.8″N 77°31′34.6″E

Architecture
- Founder: Od-de, the elder brother of Lha Lama Changchub Od
- Completed: 11th century

Spituk Monastery, also known as Spituk Gompa or Pethup Gompa, is a Buddhist monastery in Spituk, Leh district, Ladakh, 8 km from Leh. The site of Spituk was blessed by the Arhat Nyimagung. It was founded by Od-de, the elder brother of Lha Lama Changchub Od, when he came to Maryul in the 11th century. He introduced the monastic community. When Lotsewa (translator) Rinchen Zangpo came, he said that an exemplary religious community would arise there, and so the monastery was called spituk (exemplary). During the time of Dharma raja Gragspa Bum-Ide the monastery was restored by Lama Lhawang Lodos and the order of Tsonkhapa was introduced and it has remained intact as such till present. Founded as a Red Hat institution, the monastery was taken over by the Gelugpa (Yellow Hat sect) in the 15th century.

The monastery is home to 100 monks and a giant statue of Kali (unveiled during the annual festival).

Every year the Gustor Festival is held at Spituk from the 27th to 29th day in the eleventh month of the Tibetan calendar.

== Geography ==
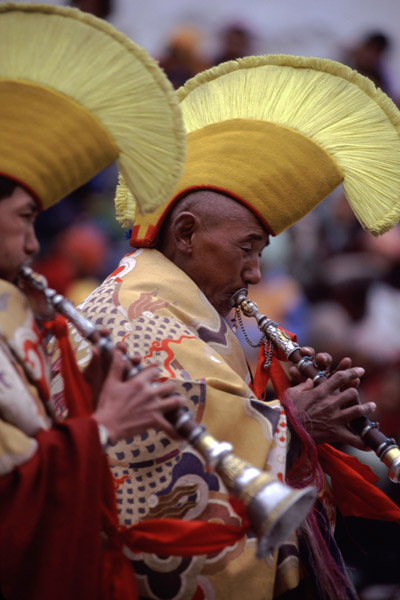
Horn players in Spituk during the Gustor Festival.

Spituk has an average elevation of 3,307 metres (10,852 feet).

== See also ==
- List of buddhist monasteries in Ladakh
- Geography of Ladakh
- Tourism in Ladakh
- World Monuments Fund
