= Culture of Ladakh =

The culture of Ladakh refers to the traditional customs, belief systems, and political systems that are followed by Ladakhi people who inhabit Ladakh in India. The culture of Ladakh has much in common with that of neighboring Tibet. Ladakhi is the traditional language of Ladakh. The popular dances in Ladakh include the khatok chenmo, cham, and jabro among others. The people of Ladakh also celebrate several festivals throughout the year like Hemis Tsechu and Losar.

== Background ==
Ladakh is the northern most part of India and shares a border with Tibet to the east, the Indian state of Himachal Pradesh and the union territory of Jammu and Kashmir to the south, and the Pakistani territory of Gilgit-Baltistan to the west. It extends from the Siachen Glacier in the Karakoram range in the north to the Himalayan range to the south. Formerly, it was a part of the Indian state of Jammu and Kashmir, but after the Jammu and Kashmir Reorganisation Act (2019), it was converted to a Union Territory. Parts of Ladakh have been the subject of dispute between India, Pakistan, and China since 1947.

Ladakh incorporates parts of the Himalayan and Karakoram mountain ranges and the upper Indus River valley. It is the only cold desert in India. Its topography is barren and population sparse inhabited along the river banks of different valleys namely Indus, Nubra, Changthang, and Zanskar. Women in Ladakh enjoy high status in comparison to rest of the nation, especially rural areas. Ladakh languages, religions, dance, music, architecture, food, and customs are similar to neighboring Tibet.

== Language ==
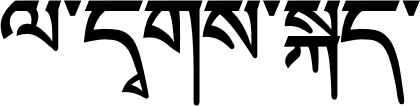
Ladakhi language

The Ladakhi language is a Tibetic language spoken in Ladakh, which is also called Bhoti or Bodhi. As per the 2011 census, approximately 110,826 people speak Ladakhi. Ladakhi has absorbed words from the silk route trade. It is usually written using Tibetan script with the pronunciation of Ladakhi being much closer to written Classical Tibetan.

== Music ==
The traditional music of Ladakh includes instruments like linyu (flute), damnyan (stringed instrument), khakong (sitar), daph, daman, surna, and piwang (shehnai and drum). Chanting of mantras in Sanskrit and the Tibetan language plays an important role in Ladakhi music. The music of Ladakhi monastic festivals, like various forms of Tibetan music, often involves chanting as an integral part of the religion. These chants are complex, often inclusind recitations of sacred texts and manuscripts or in celebration of different festivals. Folk music is an integral part of Ladakh's culture and is often inspired by the surrounding physical features. Morup Namgyal is an avid preservationist and during his 30-year career working at Ladakh's only radio station (All India Radio, Leh) he recorded a vast archive of Ladakhi folk songs.

== Dance ==
The popular dances in Ladakh include the khatok chenmo, which is headed by a respectable family member, and shondol. Some other dance forms include kompa tsum-tsak, jabro, cham, chabs-skyan tses, raldi tses, and alley yaato. Traditionally, 360 variants of dances existed in the early times, but today only a few have been preserved. Some forms of dance narrate the story of the fight between good and evil, ending with the eventual victory of the former.

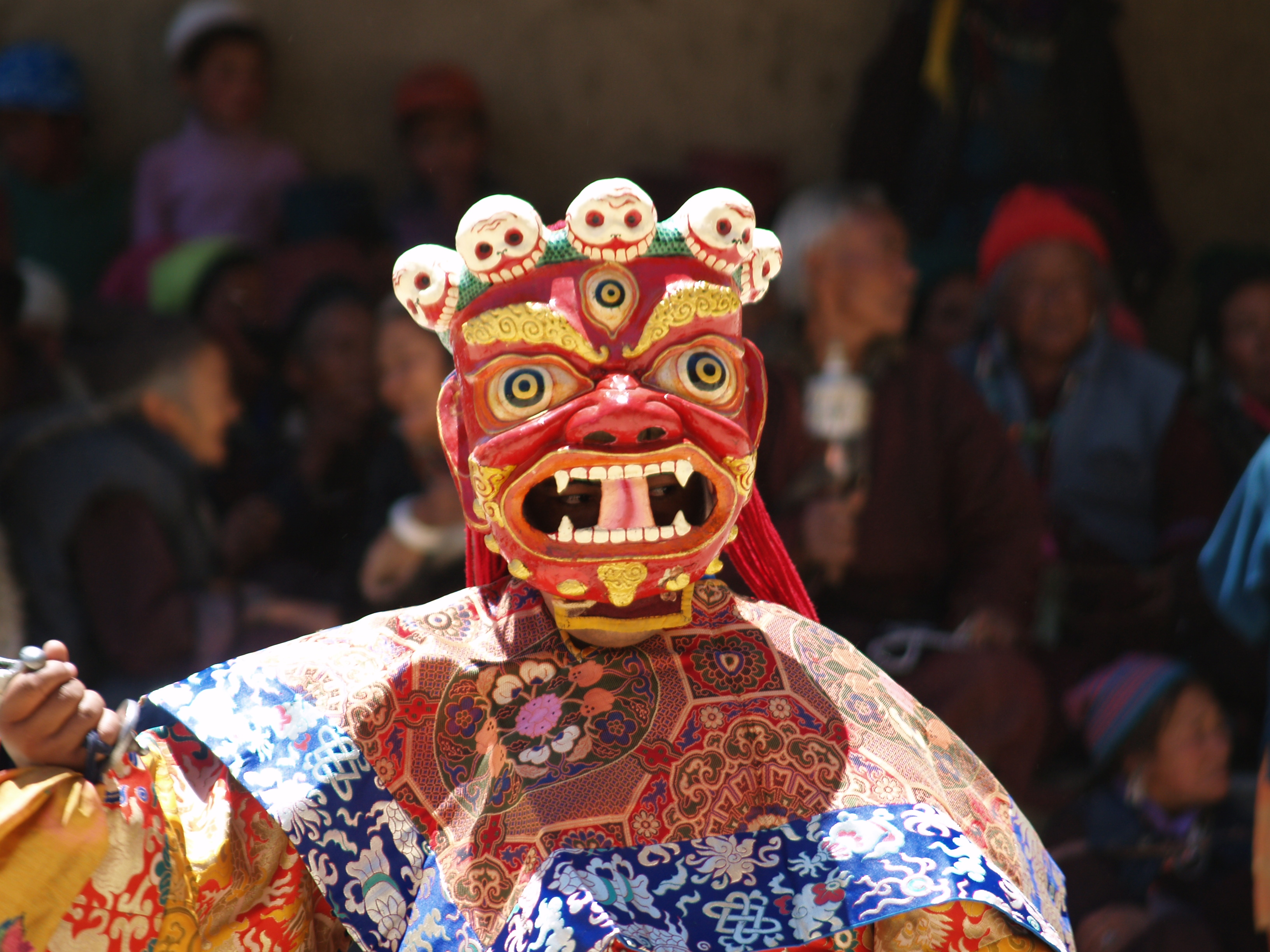
Dancer in masked dance festival

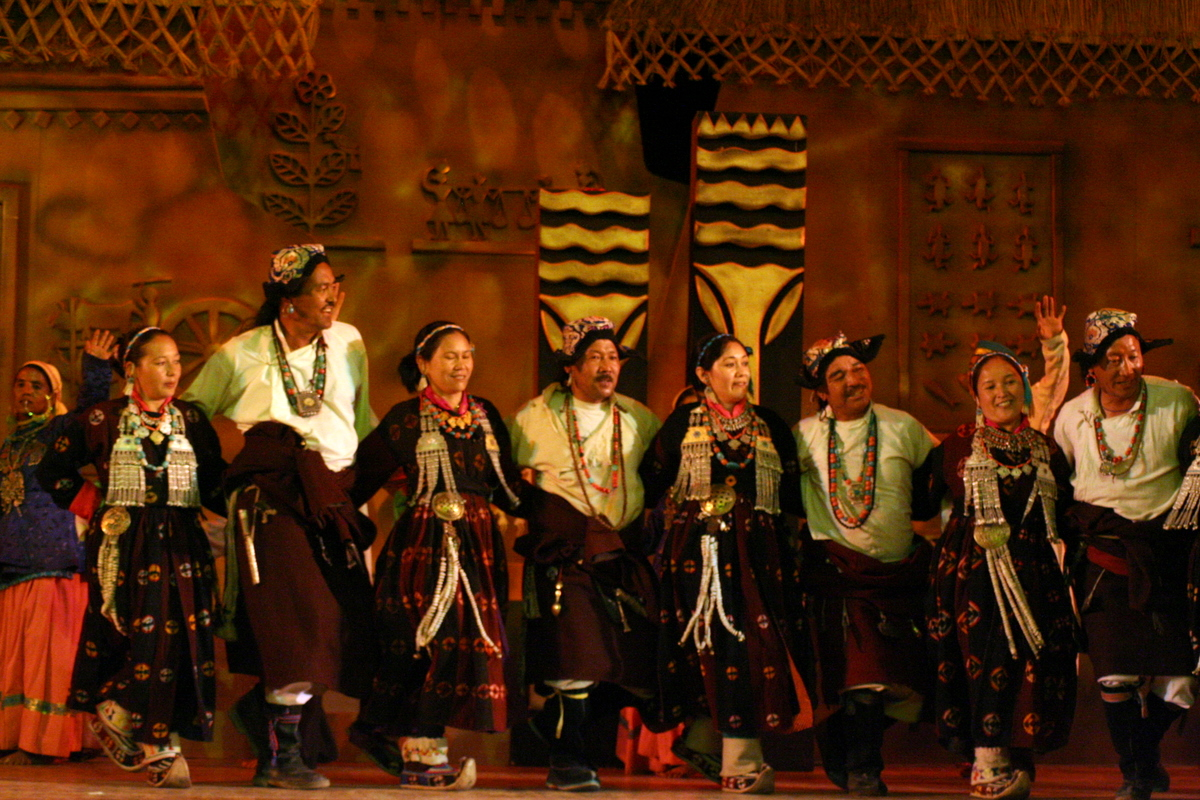
Jabro dance

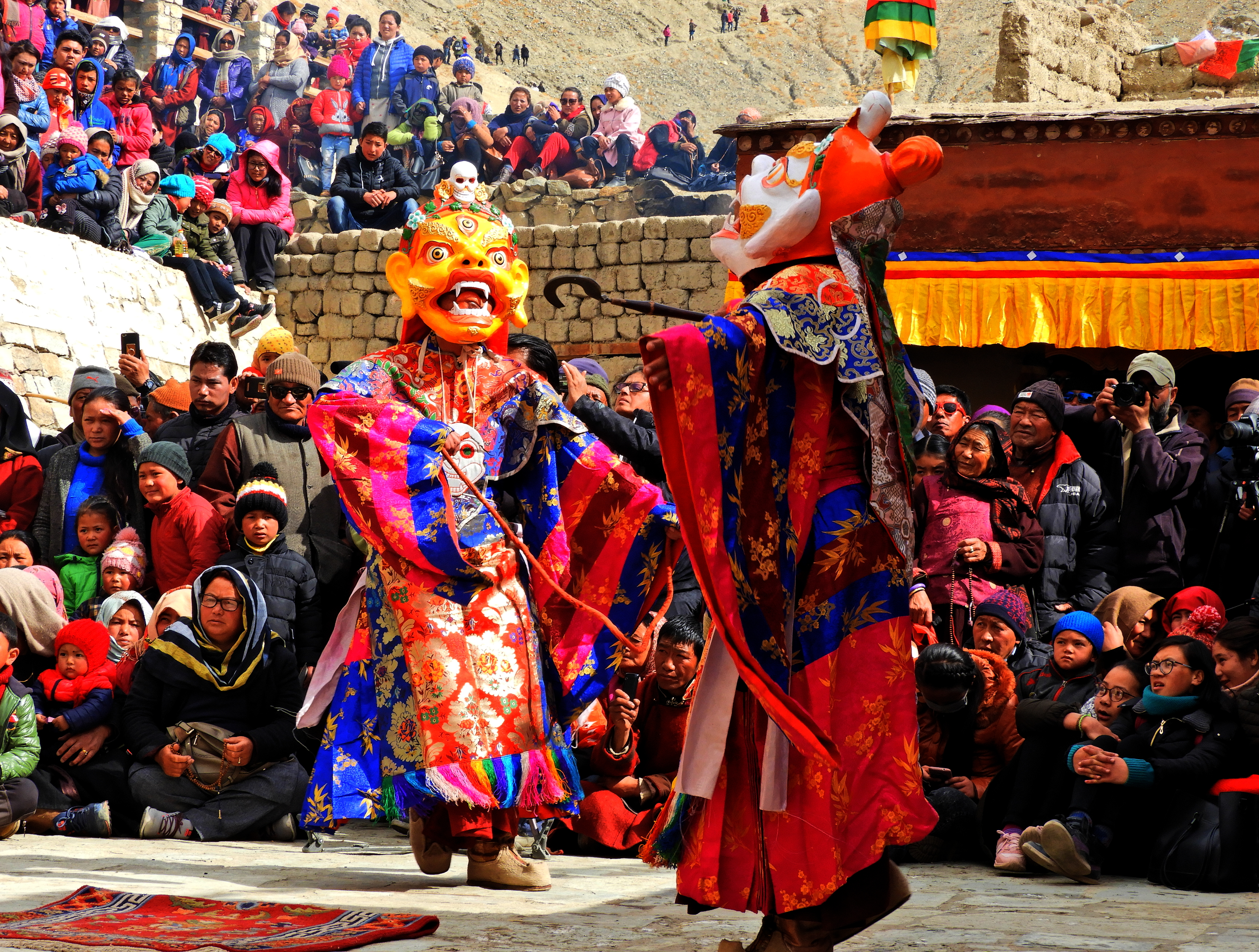
Cham dance during Dosmoche festival in Leh Palace

== Cuisine ==
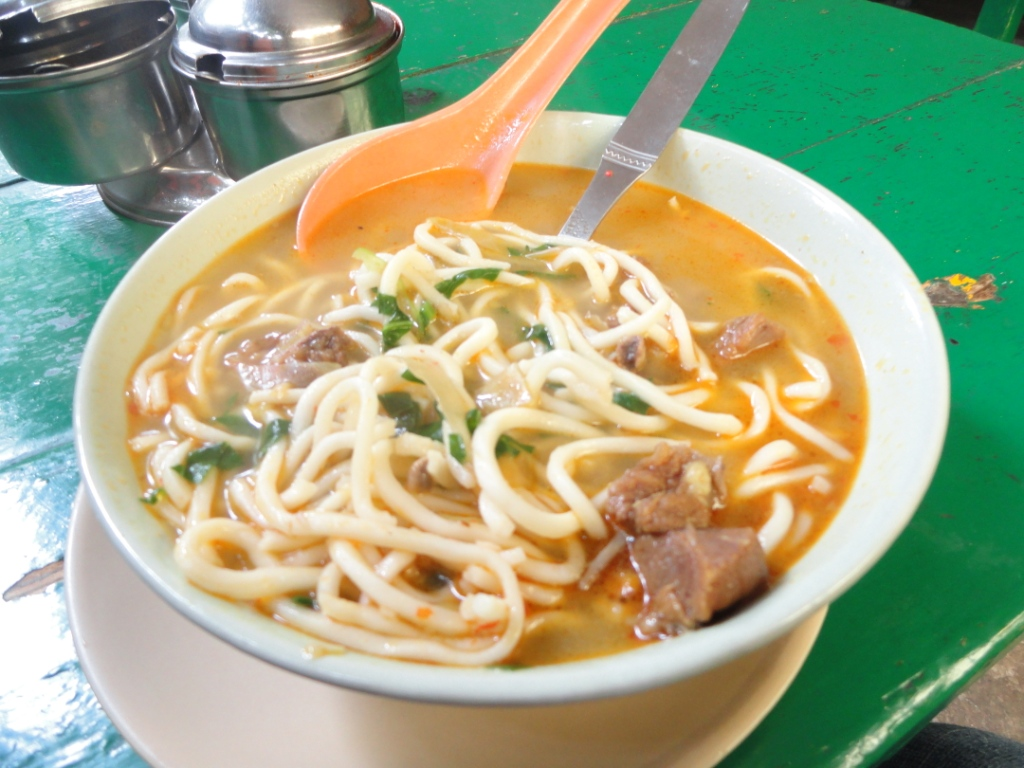
Thukpa

Ladakhi food has much in common with Tibetan food, the most prominent dishes being thukpa, a type of noodle soup and tsampa, known in Ladakhi as ngampe, which is a type of roasted barley flour. Strictly Ladakhi dishes include skyu and chutagi, both heavy and rich soup pasta dishes, skyu being made with root vegetables and meat, and chutagi with leafy greens and vegetables.

As tourism and modernization increase in Ladakh, foods from the plains of India are becoming more common.

== Festivals and events ==
Ladakh has several festivals throughout the year, including Hemis tshe-bcu, Saka Dawa, and Losar. Ladakh's festivals comprise mask dances performed by people, games such as camel races, river rafting and archery, regional music and dance performances, thangka exhibitions, etc. A lot of time is spent during festivals making stone jewellery, woolen clothes, and mural paintings on the walls of the monasteries. Weaving is considered as an essential part of traditional life in eastern Ladakh. Some festivals of Ladakh are:

- Hemis tshe-bcu - Hemis Monastery has an annual festival is named after it.
- Losar - Also known as Tibetan New Year, is a festival in Tibetan Buddhism.
- Phyang Tsedup Festival - This festival is celebrated every fifth month of the Tibetan lunar calendar.
- Sindhu Darshan Festival - It is held on every Guru Purnima on the banks of the Indus river.
- Dosmoche - It is celebrated every 12th month of the Tibetan calendar every year.
- Saka Dawa Festival.
- Tak-Tok Festival - It is one of the major festivals of Ladakh. It is celebrated at cave Gompa of Tak-Tok.
- Matho Nagrang Festival.

== Cultural centers ==
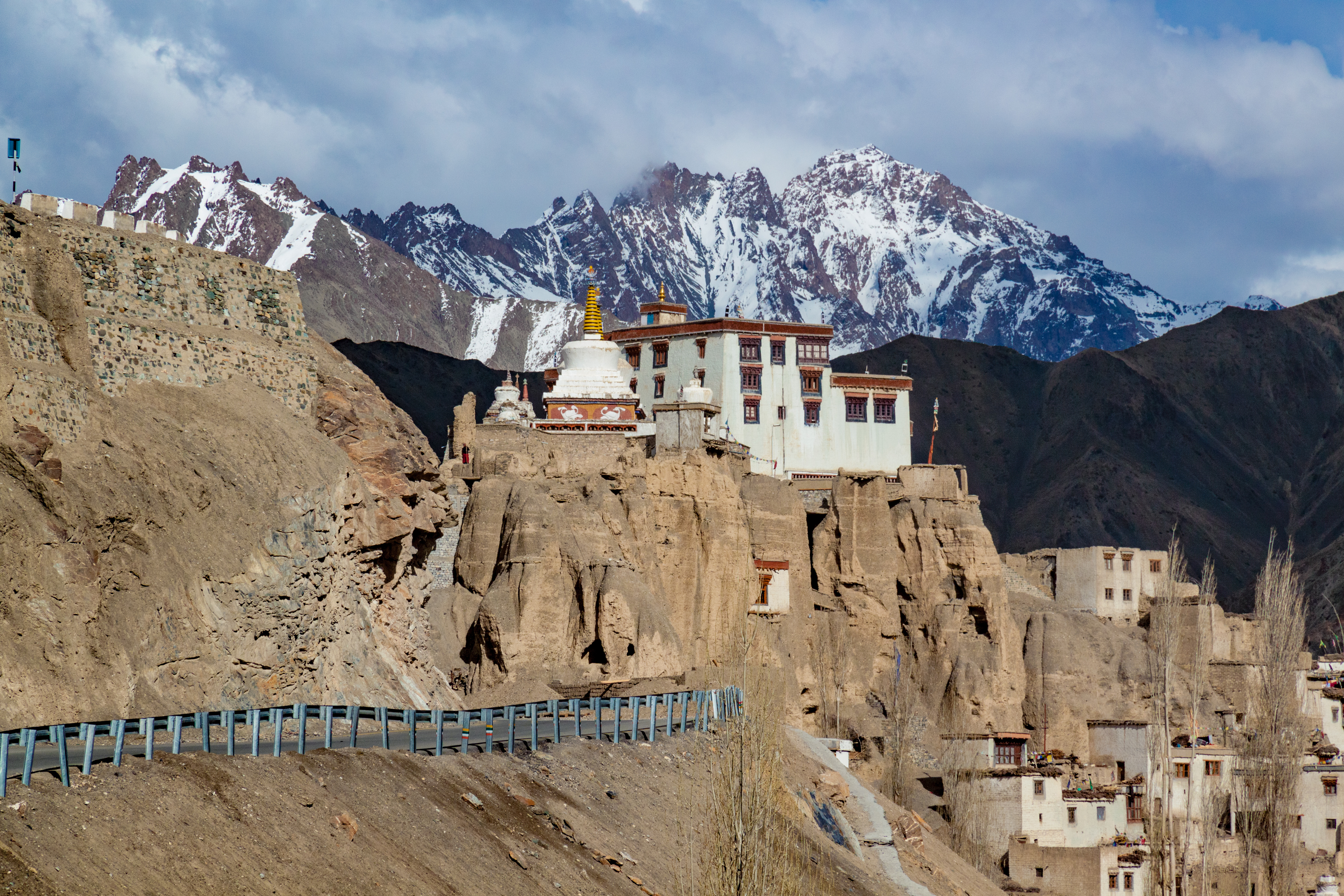
Lamayuru monastery

Buddhist monasteries are often situated on an isolated hillock in the vicinity of villages. These monasteries provide the focus for the faith of the Buddhist people. Some monasteries and cultural centers of Ladakh are:

- Thikse Monastery
- Lamayuru Monastery
- Hemis Monastery
- Stok Monastery
- Leh Palace
- Shey Monastery
- Diskit Monastery

Both Leh and Shey monasteries have carved Buddhas, mostly of the Maitreya.
