= Music of Ladakh =

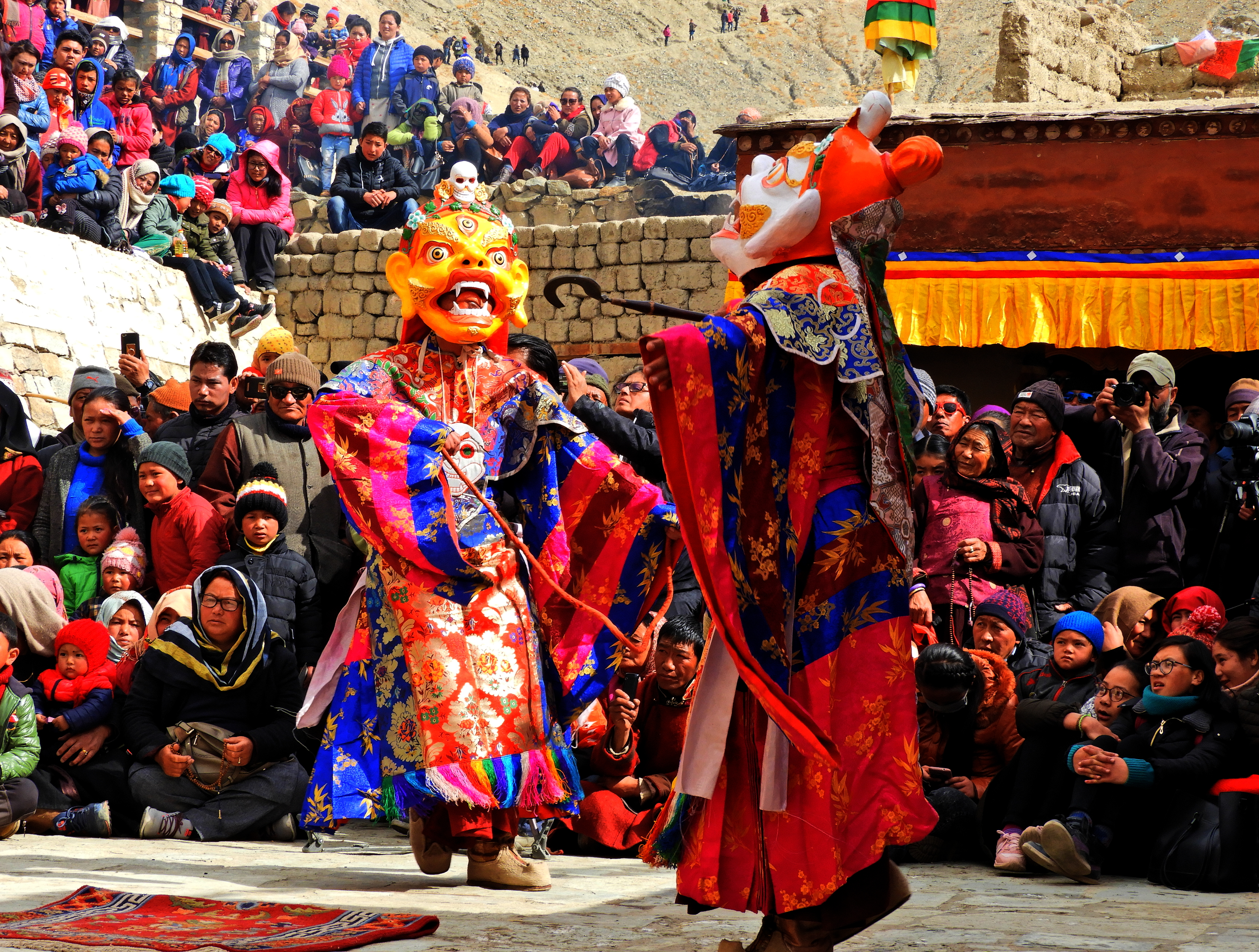
Dosmoche festival in Leh Palace

Music of Ladakh reflects a rich musical heritage and cultural legacy of Ladakh. Ladakhi music is similar to the music of Tibet. Ladakh is also called Mini Tibet.

== Dance ==
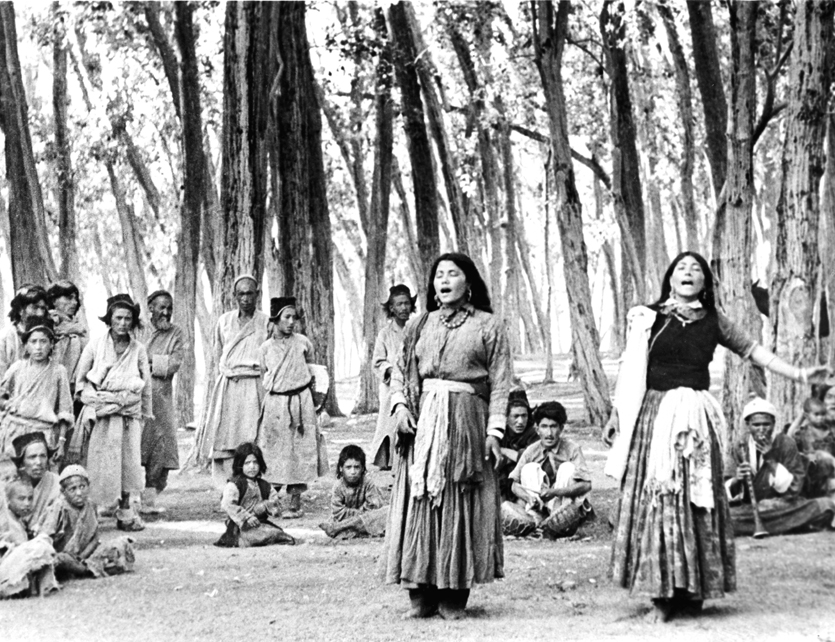
Ladakhi dance

The popular dances in Ladakh include the Khatok Chenmo which is headed by an respectable family member, Shondol, Some other dance forms includes Kompa Tsum-tsak Jabro Chaams: Chabs-Skyan Tses Raldi Tses and Alley Yaato

== Music ==
The traditional music of Ladakh includes the instruments of Daman, surna and piwang (shehnai and drum). Chanting of mantras in Sanskrit and Tibetan language plays an important role in Ladakhi music.

== See also ==
- Ladakhis
- Ladakh
