= Leh Palace =

Former royal palace in Ladakh

- གླེ་ཆེན་དཔལ་མཁར།
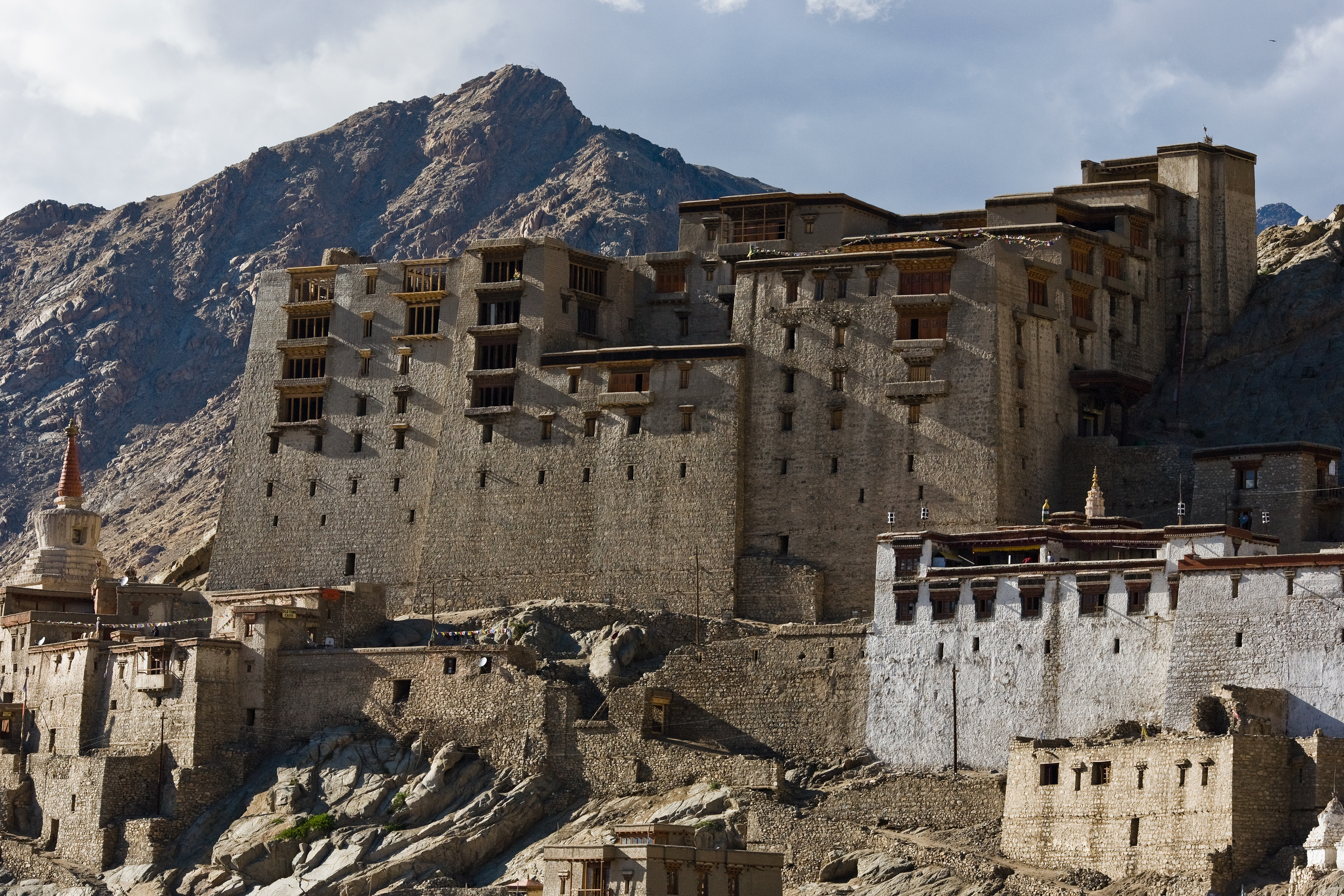
- The Leh Palace

- Location within Ladakh Leh Palace (India)
- Interactive map of the Leh Palace area

General information
- Location: Ladakh, Leh, India
- Coordinates: 34°09′59″N 77°35′11″E
- Completed: c.1600; 426 years ago

Leh Palace, also known as Lachen Palkar Palace, is a former royal palace overlooking the city of Leh in Ladakh, India. It was constructed circa 1600 AD by Sengge Namgyal. The palace was abandoned when Dogra forces took control of Ladakh in the mid-19th century and forced the royal family to move to Stok Palace.

== Details ==
It is nine storeys high; the upper floors accommodated the royal family, while the lower floors held stables and store rooms. Much of the palace is in deteriorated condition, and little survives of its interior decorations.

== Palace Museum ==
The Palace Museum holds a rich collection of jewellery, ornaments, ceremonial dresses and crowns. Tibetan thangka or paintings, which are more than 450 years old, with intricate designs still retain the bright colours derived from crushed and powdered gems and stones. Structures around the palace's base include the prominent Namgyal Stupa (Tibetan: གཙུག་གཏོར་རྣམ་རྒྱལ་མ།, Sanskrit: Uṣṇīṣavijayā), the colourfully muraled Chandazik Gompa (Tibetan: སྤྱན་རས་གཟིགས།, Sanskrit: अवलोकितेश्वर/Avalokiteśvara) and the 1430 Chamba Lhakhang (Tibetan: བྱམས་པ་མགོན་པོ།, Sanskrit:मैत्रेय/Maitreya Buddha) with medieval mural fragments located between the inner and outer walls.

== Conservation and restoration ==
The palace is being restored by the Archaeological Survey of India. The palace is open to the public and the roof provides panoramic views of Leh and the surrounding areas.

== Festival ==
The annual Dosmoche festival is celebrated around February in Leh Palace as well as the Likir and Diskit monasteries.

== Transport ==
Leh Palace Ropeway, proposed in 2022 as part of Parvatmala, is in the planning stage.

== Gallery ==
Leh Palace

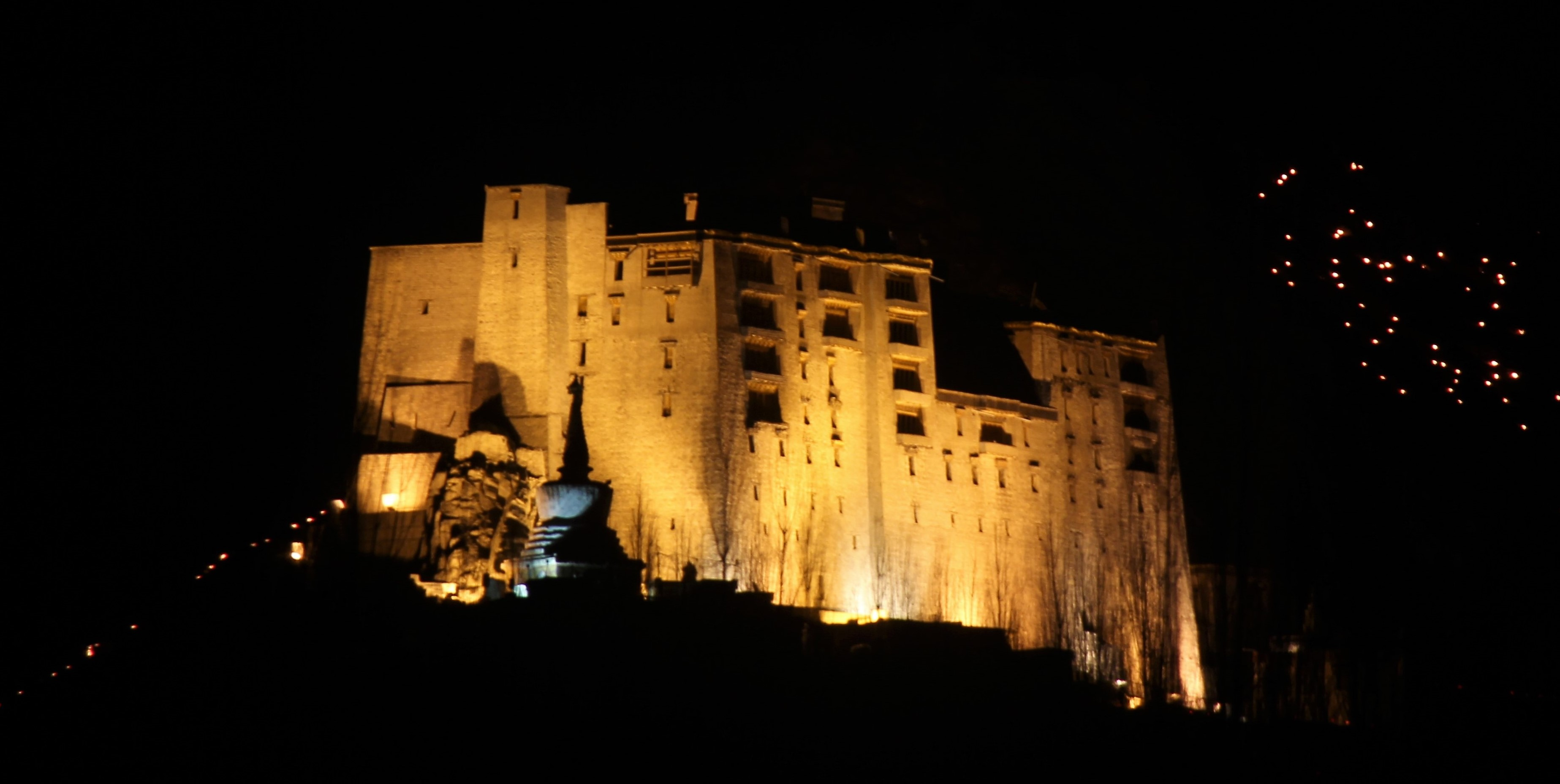
Leh Palace lit at night during the Galdan Namchot festival.

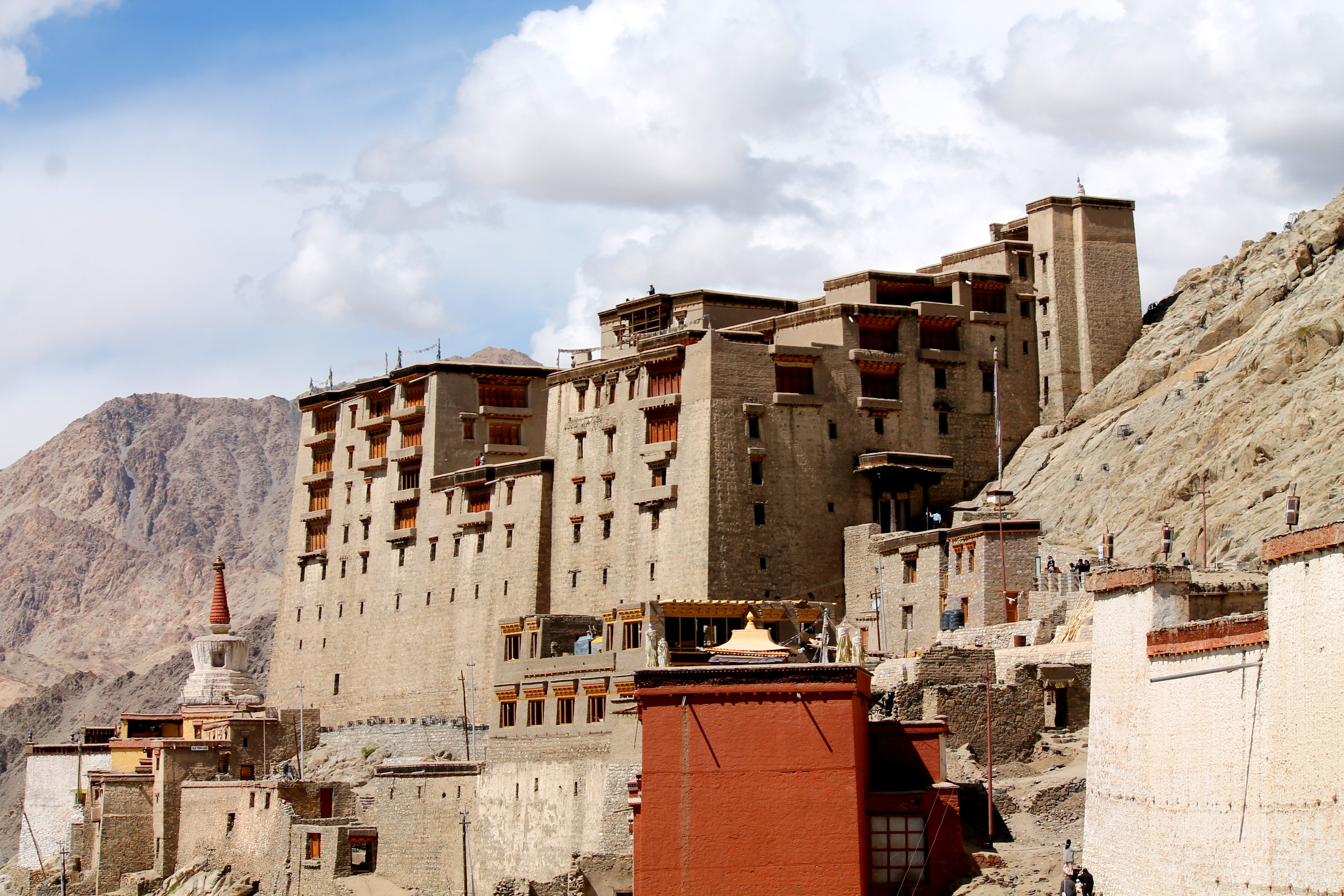
Leh Palace, Morning view (2021)

== See also ==
- Potala Palace, built in 1645 in the same architectural style.
