= Lhachen Gyalpo =

Lhachen Gyalpo (ལྷ་ཆེན་རྒྱལ་པོ, Lha-chen-rgyal-po) (c. 1050-1080 CE) was the fifth king of Ladakh. He is mentioned in the Ladakhi Chronicles. During his reign, important buildings like the Likir Monastery were built. He had a "brotherhood" of monks to settle there. He belongs to Nyima-Gon dynasty.

Also, by the three lakes near Gaṅs-ri (Kailash) there were at times a hundred and at other times five hundred recluses staying there and "he for a long time, with untiring zeal, provided [them] with the necessities of life."
