= Dosmoche =

Buddhist festival celebrated in Ladakh, India

Dosmoche/ Dosmochhey
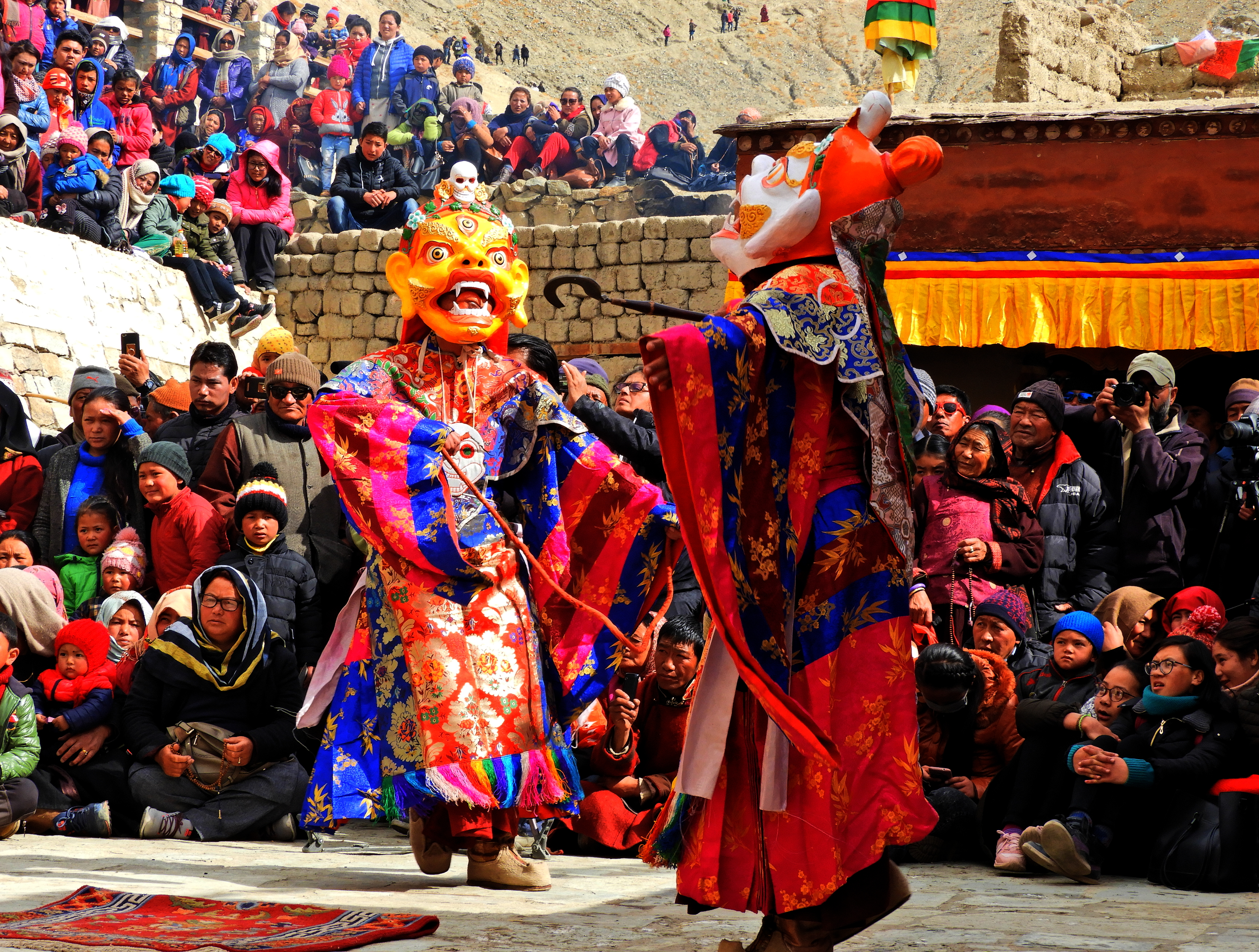
- Cham dance during Dosmoche festival 2018 in Leh Palace
- Observed by: Buddhists
- Type: Religious festival New year Commemoration
- Significance: being celebrated for peace and prosperity in the coming Ladakhi new year
- Begins: February
- Ends: February
- Date: 28th and 29th day of the 12th month of the Tibetan lunar calendar every year
- Duration: 2 days
- Frequency: Annual

Dosmoche is a Buddhist festival celebrated in Ladakh, India. It is celebrated in Leh, Likir and Diskit monasteries. It is the last festival of New Year Celebrations, the other one is Losar. The two-day Dosmoche festival is a gazetted holiday for Leh district and Zanskar Sub Division. Dosmoche is also known as the "Festival of Scapegoat" and is one of Ladakh's most popular prayer festivals. This festival is also celebrated to purify the town from evil spirits.

== History ==
Dosmoche was started by the rulers of Ladakh. The festival was started during kingdom of King Lhachen Gongdup/ Lha-chen-Dnos-grub (1295–1320). He fought two battles with invaders from Nyungti (Kullu of Himachal Pradesh) to inhibit the exterminatory forces of the battles. Sacred mask dances, known as Cham dance, are carried out in the courtyard of the old chapel, below the gates of the Leh Palace. Lamas are drawn from different monasteries from across Ladakh on a rotation basis for this festival.

== Celebrations ==
High pitched sound of gyaling with the periodic sound of the cymbals echoed off the bare rocky slopes with the rhythmic beats of the drum. Monks look attractive in multicoloured robes and various masks, representing various forms of deities including Buddha. They danced to the beats with colorful fluttering surge to ward off evil and welcome universal peace and happiness. Mask dances are an essential part of Tantric tradition of Mahayana Buddhism.

At a one-kilometre stretch from Moti-Market to the other end of Leh Bazaar, thousands of stalls are also famous for a two-day long festival. Thousands of people in colourful dresses converge at Leh bazaar for games like tambola, lotteries and shopping.

== Schedule ==
Since Ladakh follows the Tibetan lunar calendar and Dosmoche festival comes on the twenty-eighth and twenty-ninth day of the twelfth month of the Tibetan calendar, every year the festival falls on a different date of the Gregorian calendar.

Year	Date
2014	27–28 February
2015	17–18 February
2016	6–7 February
2017	24–25 February
2018	13–14 February
2019	2–3 February
2020	21–22 February
2021	12–13 February
2022	28 February - 1 March
2023	18–19 February

== Gallery ==
Dosmoche Festival
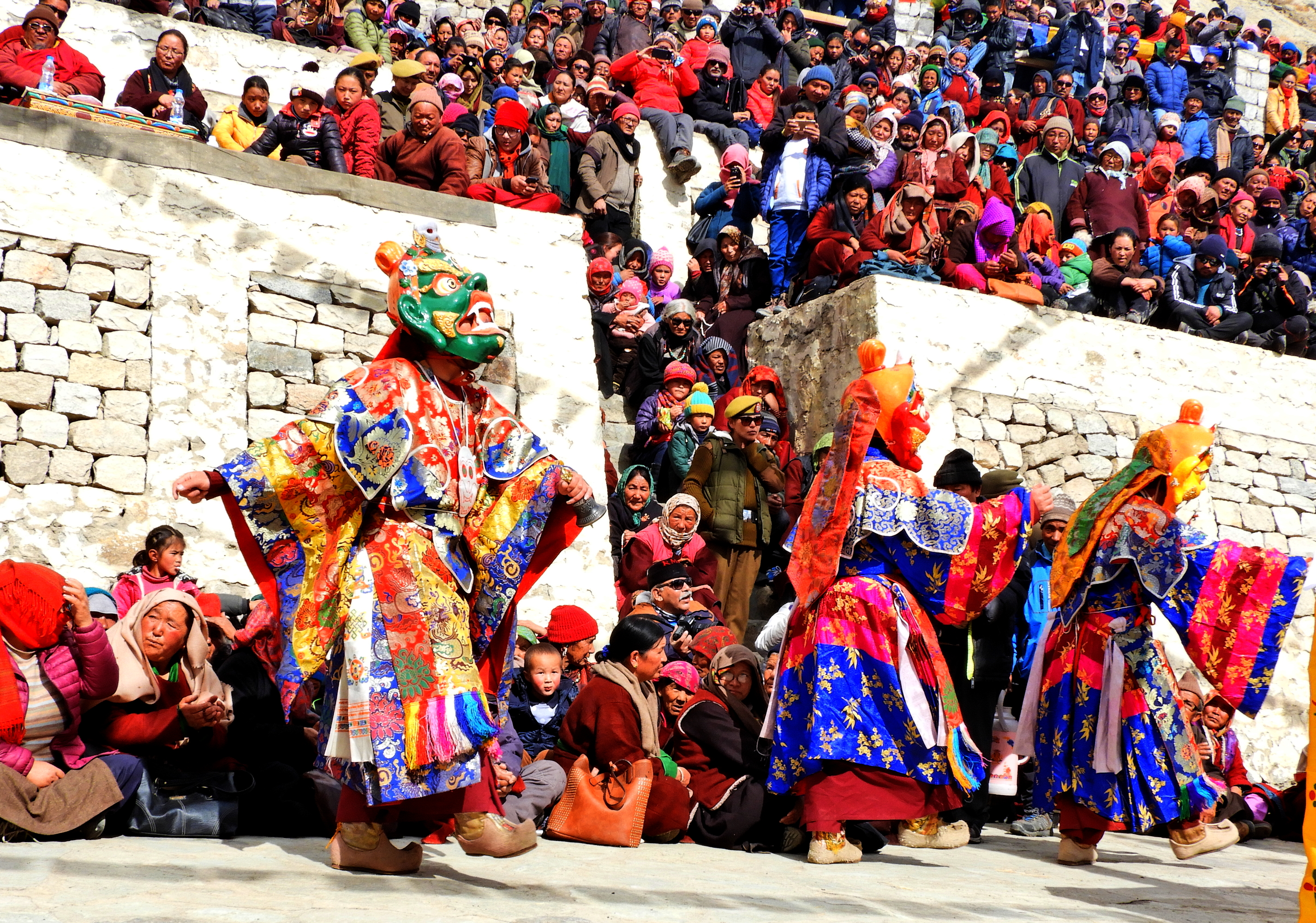
Cham dance during Dosmoche festival in Leh Palace

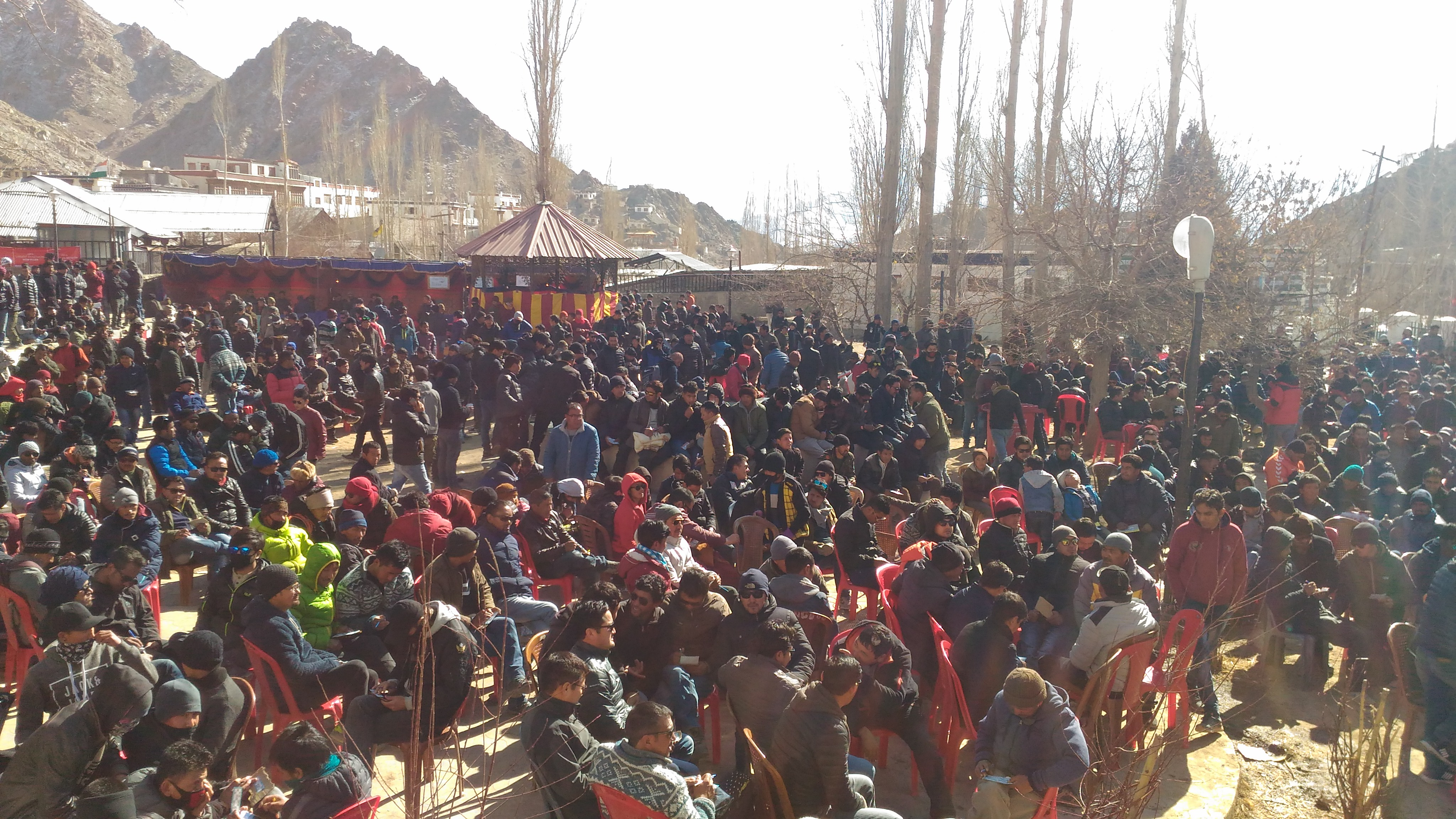
People are enjoying games like Tambola and lotteries during festival.

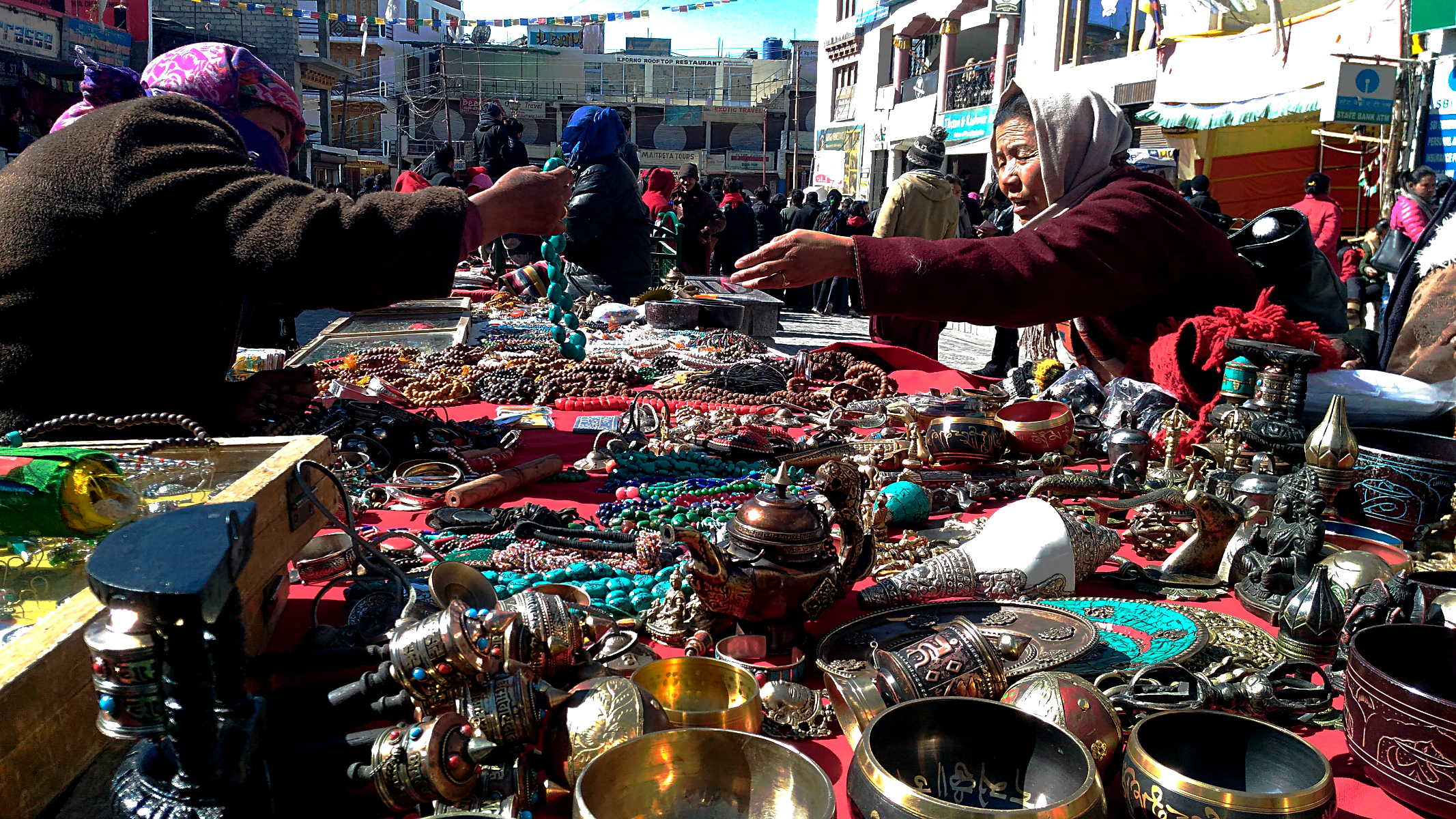
Purchasing during festival

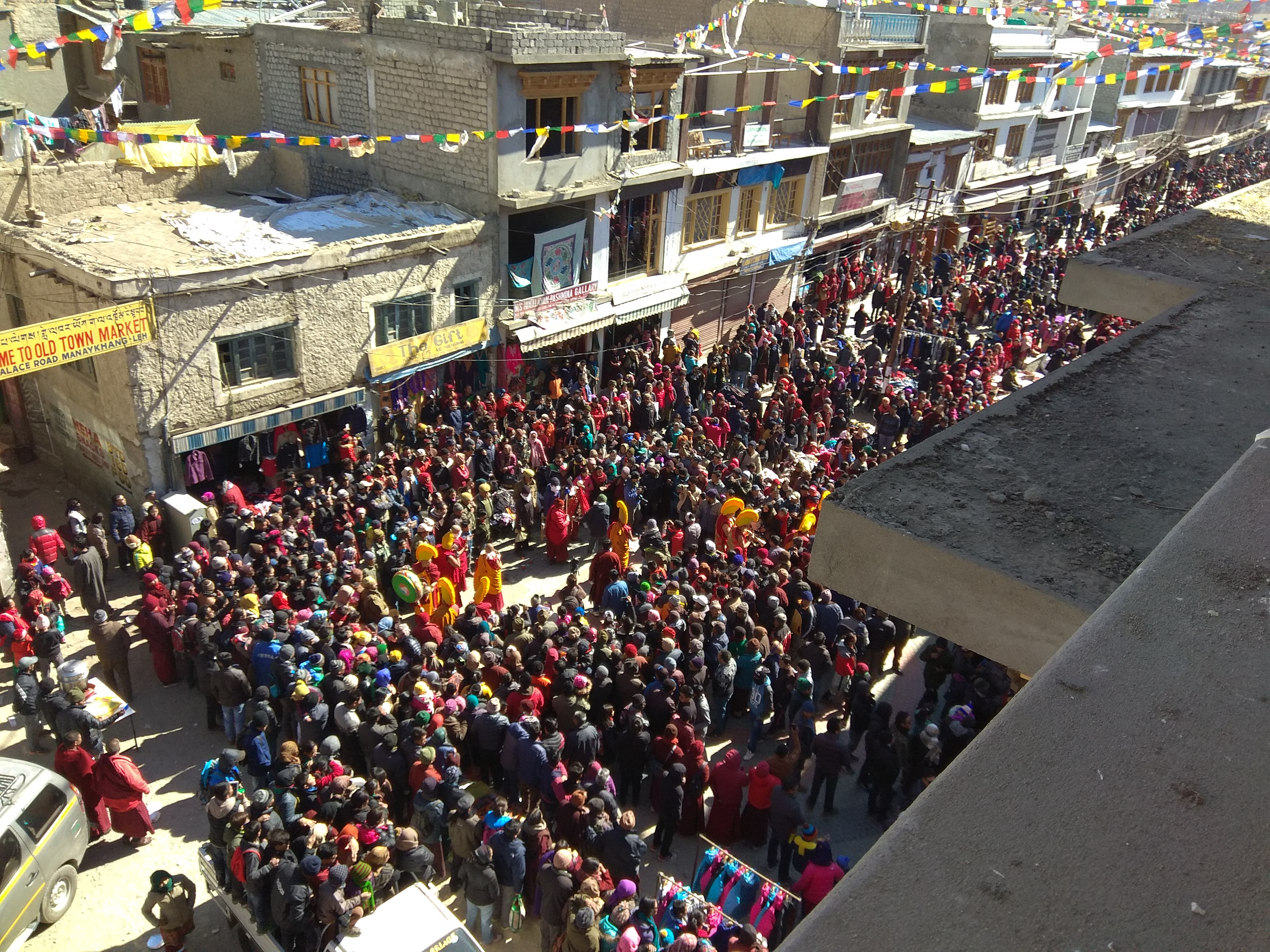
Second day of Dosmoche festival at Leh market
