= Likir Monastery =

Buddhist monastery in Ladakh, Northern India

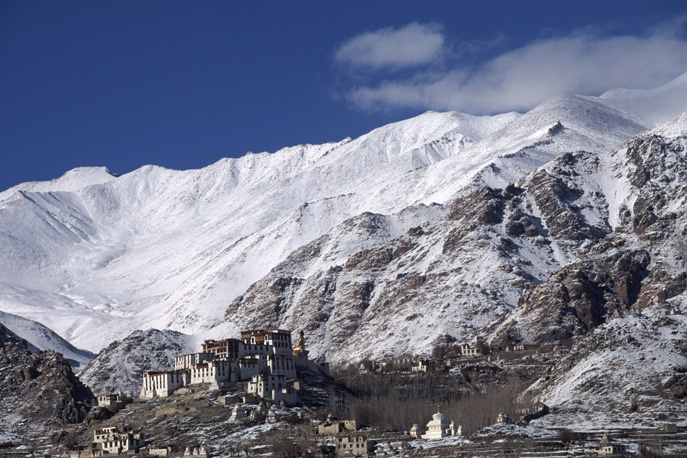

- Location in Ladakh, India

Religion
- Affiliation: Tibetan Buddhism
- Sect: Gelug

Location
- Location: Likir, Ladakh, India
- Coordinates: 34°16′36″N 77°12′54″E

Architecture
- Style: Gompa
- Founder: Duwang Chosje and Lhachen Gyalpo
- Established: 11th century

Likir Monastery or Likir Gompa (Klud-kyil) is a Buddhist monastery in Ladakh, Northern India. It is located at 3700m elevation, approximately 52 kilometres (32 mi) west of Leh. It is picturesquely situated on a little hill in the valley, in Likir village near the Indus River about 9.5 kilometres (5.9 mi) north of the Srinigar to Leh highway. It belongs to the Gelugpa sect of Tibetan Buddhism and was established in 1065 by Lama Duwang Chosje, at the command of the fifth king of Ladakh, Lhachen Gyalpo (Lha-chen-rgyal-po). It is off the Leh-Kargil Highway, 50 km west of Leh between Alchi and Basgo, 17 km west of Basgo Monastery and 21 km northeast of Alchi Monastery.

Although Likir is relatively isolated, it was once on a major trade route from Tingmosgang via Hemis and Likir to Leh.

== History ==
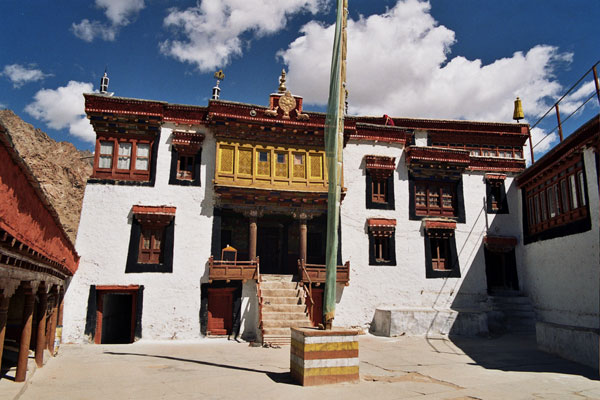

Likir is mentioned in the Ladakhi Chronicles as erected by King Lhachen Gyalpo (Lha-chen-rgyal-po) (c. 1050-1080 CE). It presumably originally belonged to the early Kadampa order of Tibetan Buddhism.

When Tibetologist August Hermann Francke visited the monastery in 1909 he was shown a long inscription written in black ink on a wall which outlined the history of the monastery. Francke had it copied and interprets it as follows:

"King Lha-chen-rgyal-po founded the monastery in the 11th century. In the 15th century, Lama Lha-dbang-chos-rje [a famous pupil of Tsongkhapa converted the lamas to the reformed doctrines of the Ge-lug-pa order, and thus founded the monastery afresh as a Ge-lug-pa establishment. Then it is stated that seven generations after Lha-chen-rgyal-po, King Lha-chen-dngos-grub [c. 1290-1320] arose, and that he introduced the custom of sending all the novices to Lhasa. This statement is found in exactly the same words as we find in the rGyal-rabs"

Eighteen generations later King bDe-legs-rnam-rgyal reigned, but his name has been erased from the inscription because he embraced Islam after the battle of Basgo in 1646–1647. The inscription itself is dated to the reign of King Thse-dbang-rnam-rgyal II (Tsewang Namgyal II, c. 1760–1780), who repaired the monastery after a conflagration.

Below the monastery was a large chorten with frescoes inside representing Tsongkapa and other lamas of his time. "Painted above the door, a very strange figure is found which looks much like one of the ordinary representations of Srong-btsan-sgam-po (Songtsän Gampo). I was told by the lamas that it represents a lama of Srong-btsan-sgam-po's times. The figure wears a three-pointed hat of white colour and carries two leopard skins under his arms." The lower part of the chorten is a square room which a lama said was the earliest temple at Likir, and was already there when King Lha-chenrgyal-po built the monastery.

The monastery currently has approximately 120 Buddhist monks and a school with almost thirty students. The Central Institute of Buddhist Studies runs it and teaches in three languages, Hindi, Sanskrit and English. Historical notes on sign outside gompa:

Lu.Khyil (water spirits circled) popularly known as “Likil” Gonpa gives its name to Nagas (water spirits) who once lived there. It is another important Ge.lug.pa monastery in Ladakh. Lachen Gyalpo, the fifth king of Ladakh is said to have offered to Lama Duwans Chosje, a great master of meditation, the land for building a monastery in 1065. This monastery joined the Gelugpa order in the 15th century. The Du-Khang (Assembly Hall) contains Mar.ime.zat, Shakyamuni, and Maitreya (Buddhas of the past, present and future) an imposing statue of Tsong.Kha.pa and Kangyur and Tangyur. In Nyenes Khang are life-like paintings of the Tung-Shah (the thirty-five confessional Buddhas and Nas.Tan.Chu.Tuk, sixteen arahats) The Gon.Khang houses the statue of Se.Ta.Pa an imposing protective deity of the monastery and Yamantaka. Likir Dos.mo.che, the annual festival of the monastery, is held from the 27th to the 29th of the 12th Tibetan month. By Courtesy of Tourism Dept. Leh

It is the seat of the Ngari Rinpoche, the present emanation of the younger brother of the Dalai Lama. Although he does not permanently reside here, he attends the more important pujas.

== Layout and interior ==
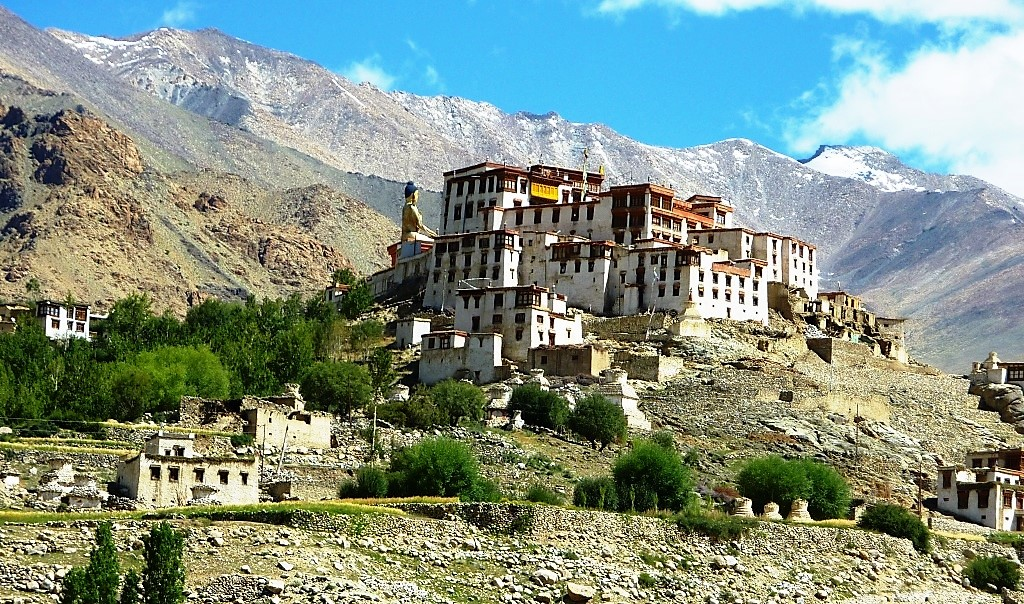
View of Likir monastery

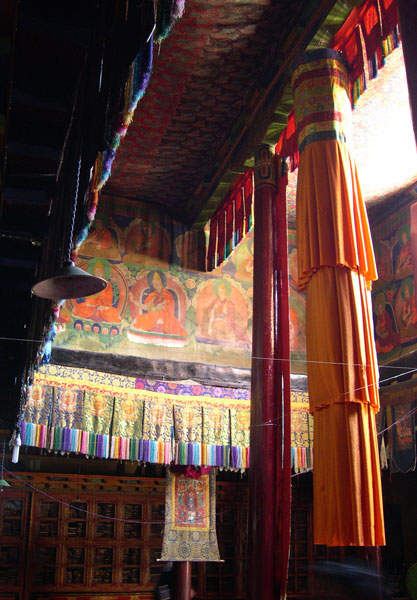
View of Likir gompa

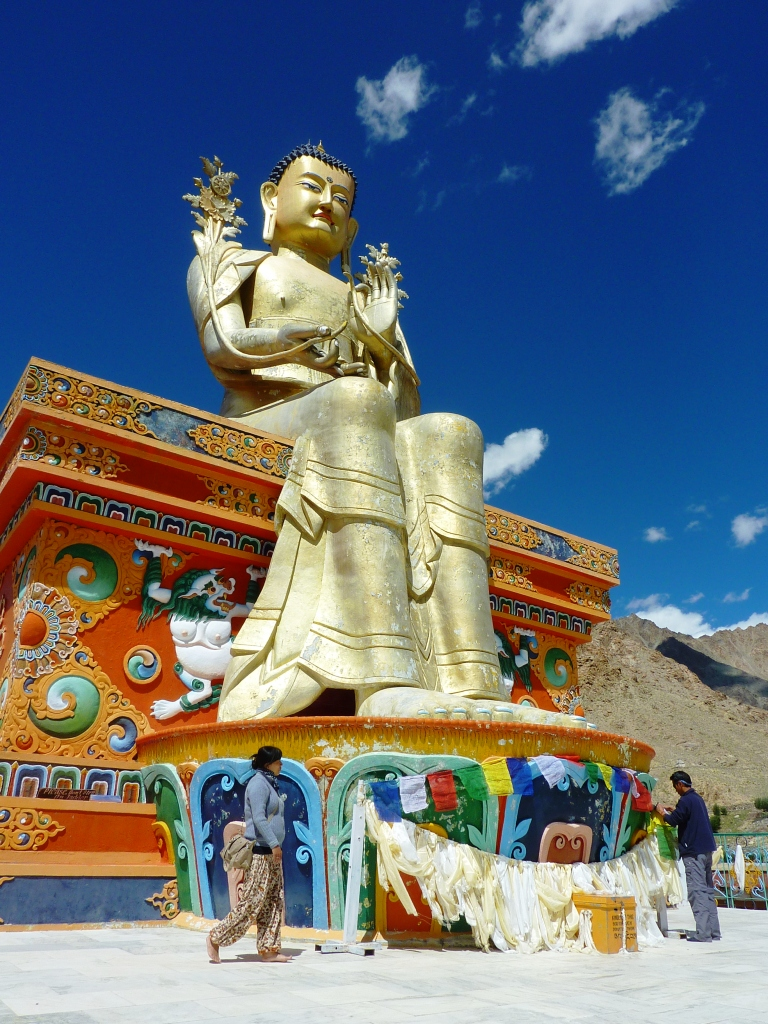
Hanging prayer flags on the 23 m (75 ft) statue of Maitreya

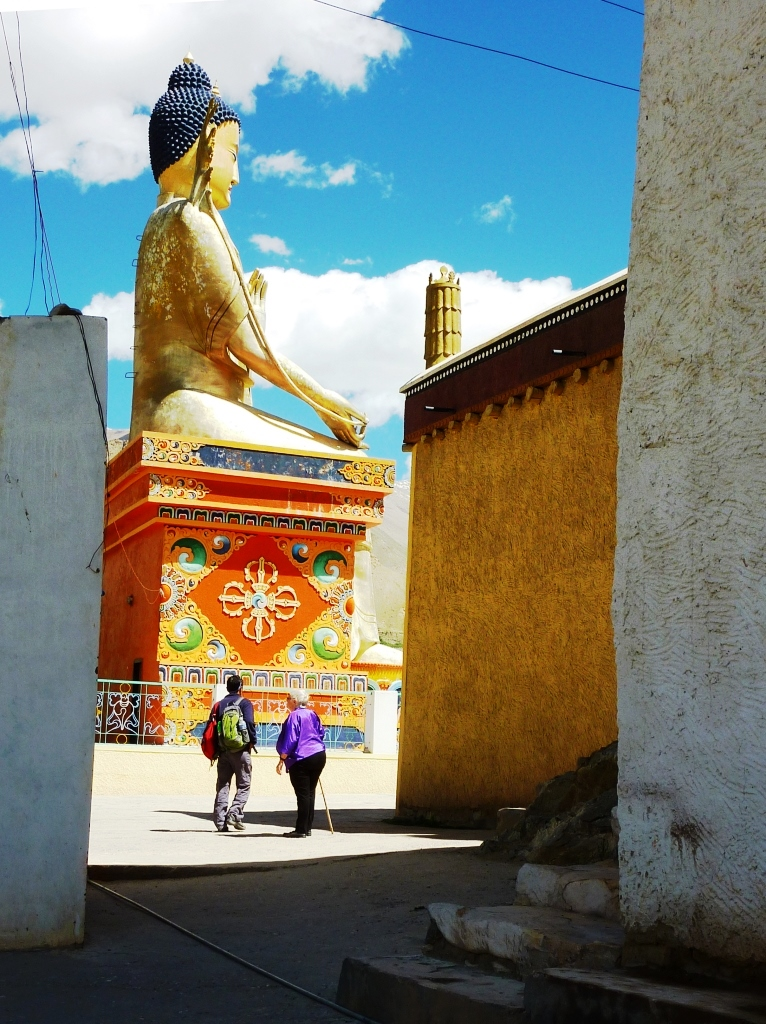
Side view of Maitreya statue, Likir gompa

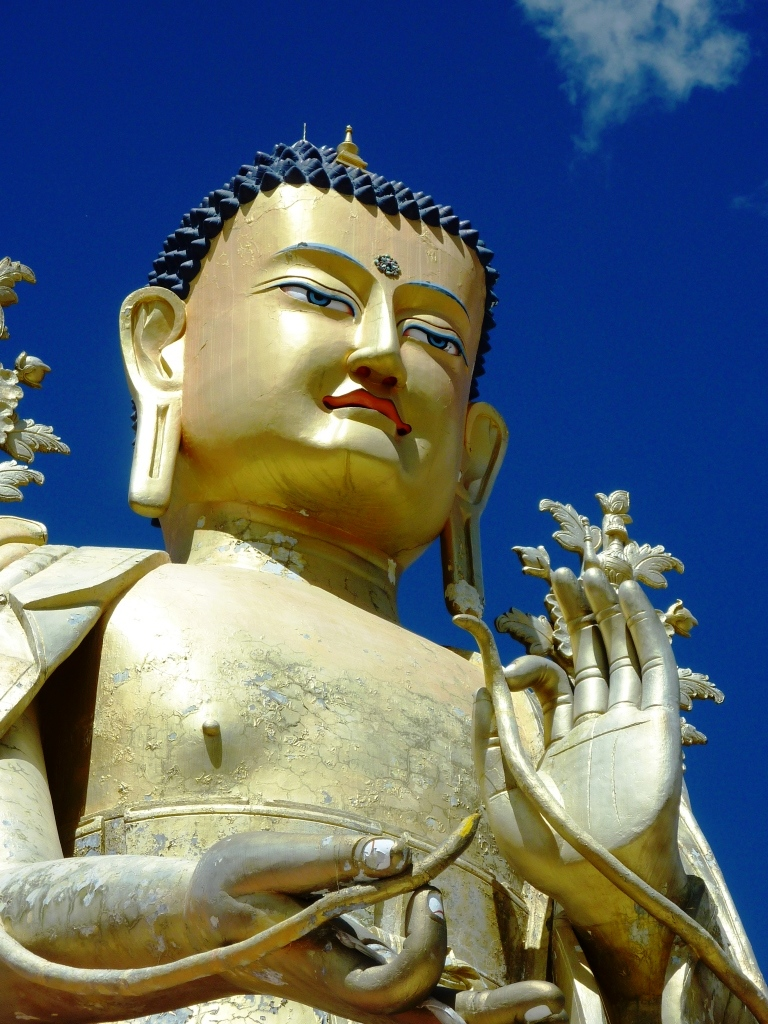
Closeup of Maitreya statue, Likir gompa

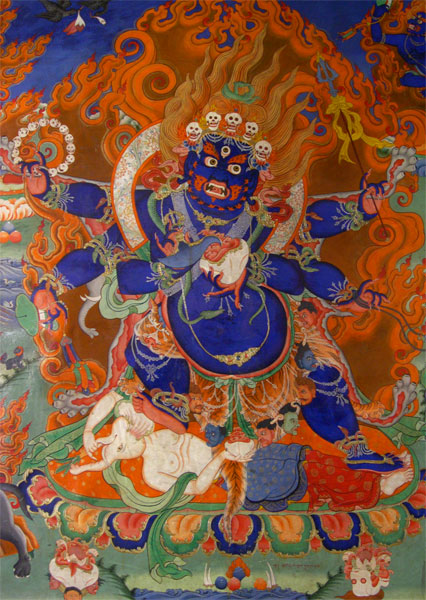
A Mahakala thangka in Likir

The monastery has two assembly halls, known as dukhangs. The older one is located on the right of the central courtyard, with six rows of seats for the lamas and a throne for the head lama of Likir. The dukhangs contain statues of Bodhisattva, Amitabha, three large statues of Sakyamuni, Maitreya and Tsong Khapa, founder of the yellow hat sect. The monastery is also a repository of old manuscripts, has a notable thangka collection and old costumes and earthen pots. Sitting on the roof is a 23-metre (75 ft) high gilded gold statue of Maitreya (the future Buddha), completed in 1999.

Bookcases stand at the statue sides, with volumes of the Sumbum, describing the life and teachings of Tsong Khapa. The left wall has paintings of the 35 confessional Buddhas while the right wall has an image of Sakyamuni with two of his chiefs by his side.

A ladder leads out of the hall, to the zinchun, the head lama's room, which contains thangkas and images of lamas and the 21 manifestations of the White Tara, the consort of Avalokitesvara. The gonkhang was created in 1983 when the monastery underwent renovation and was completed a year later The walls of the gonkhang display thangkas of the divinities.

== Gallery ==
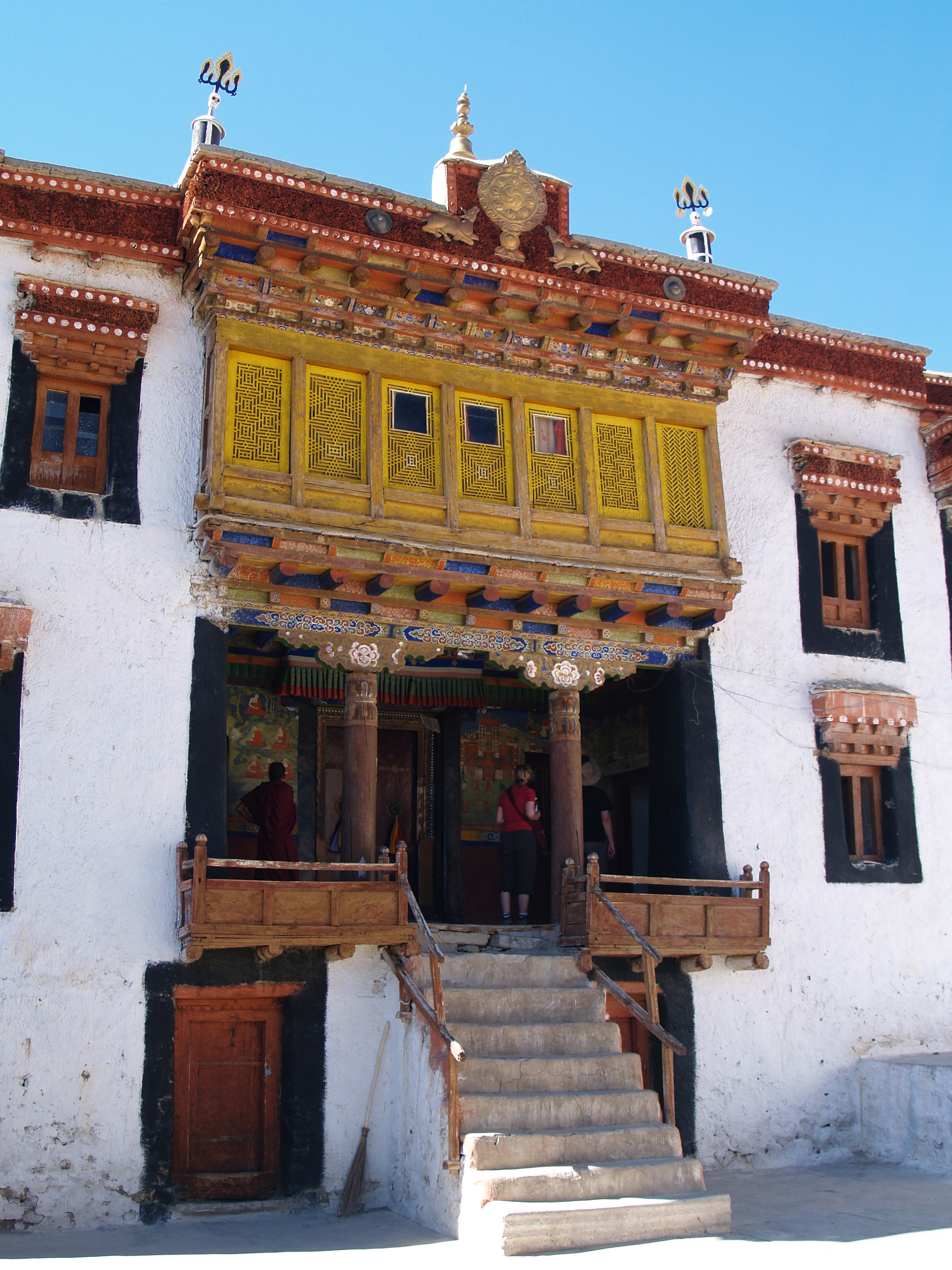

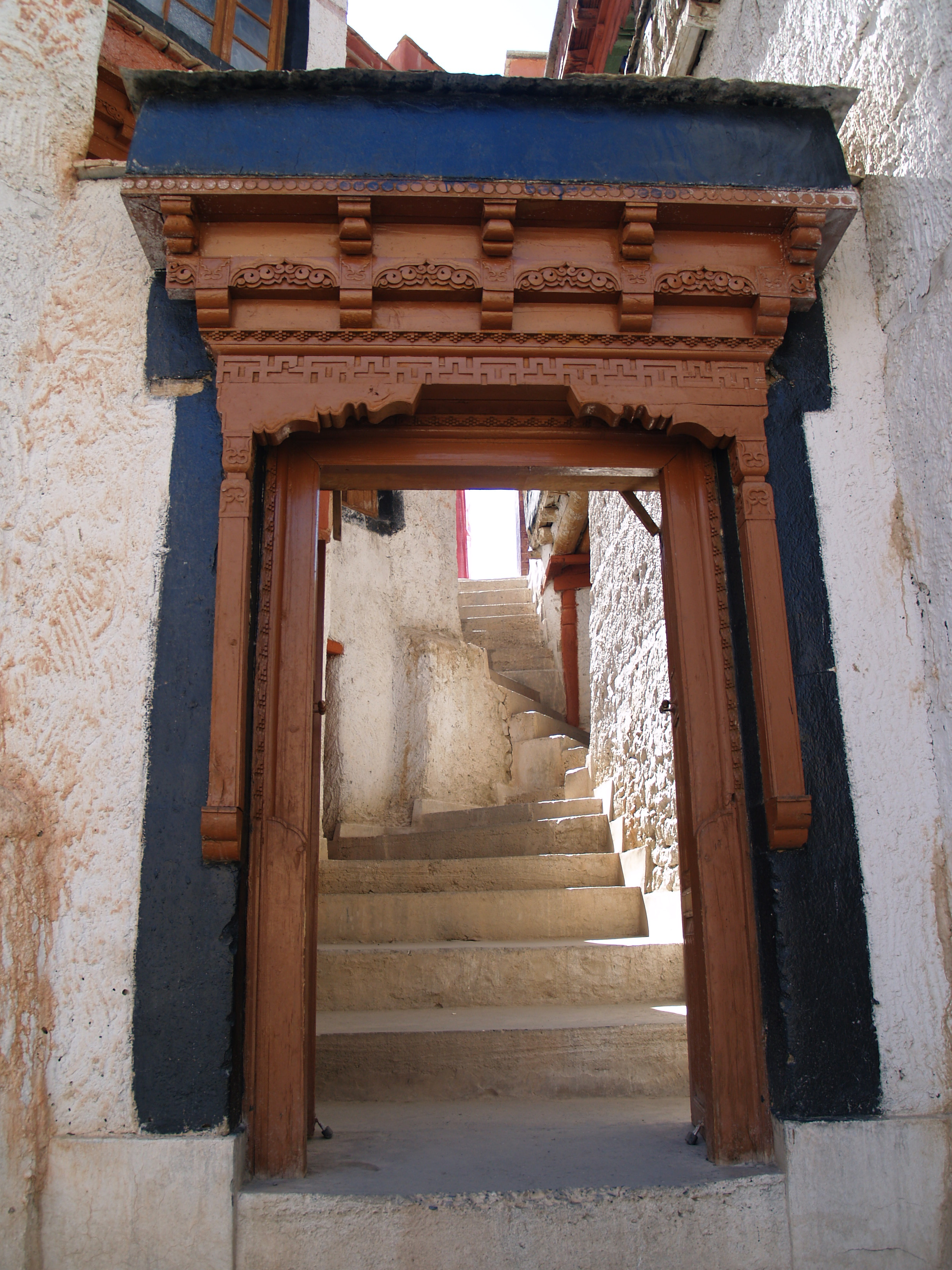

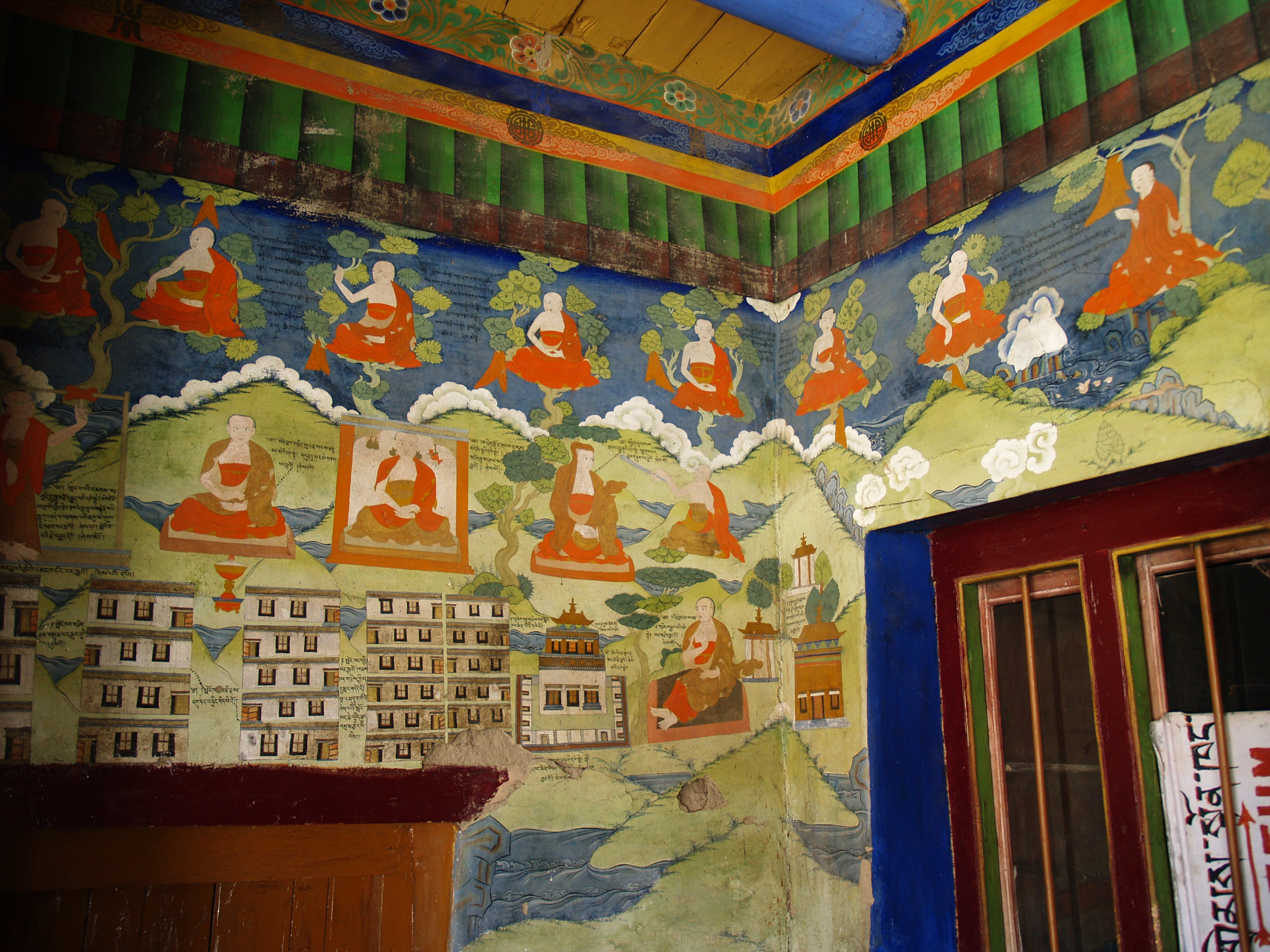

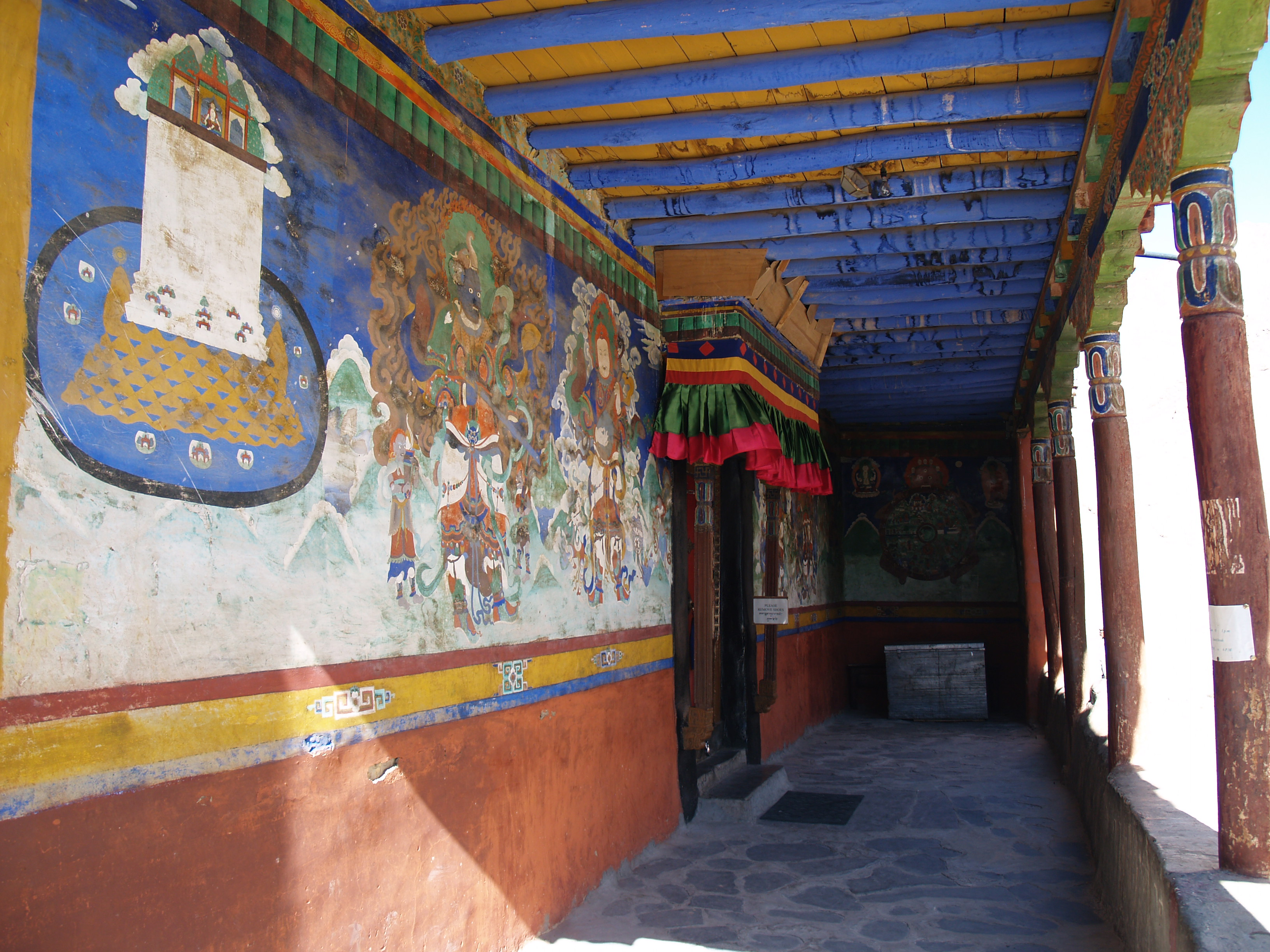

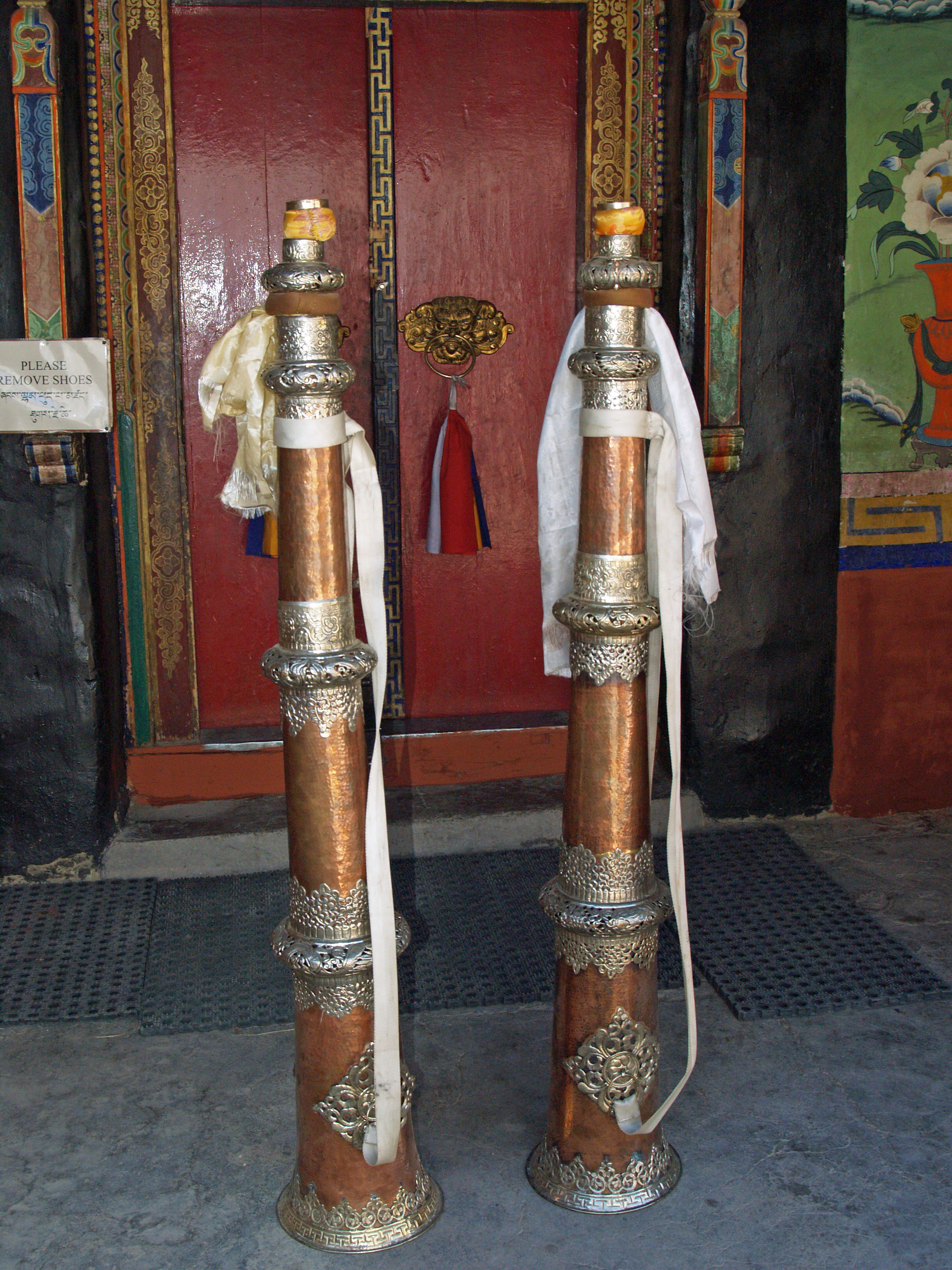

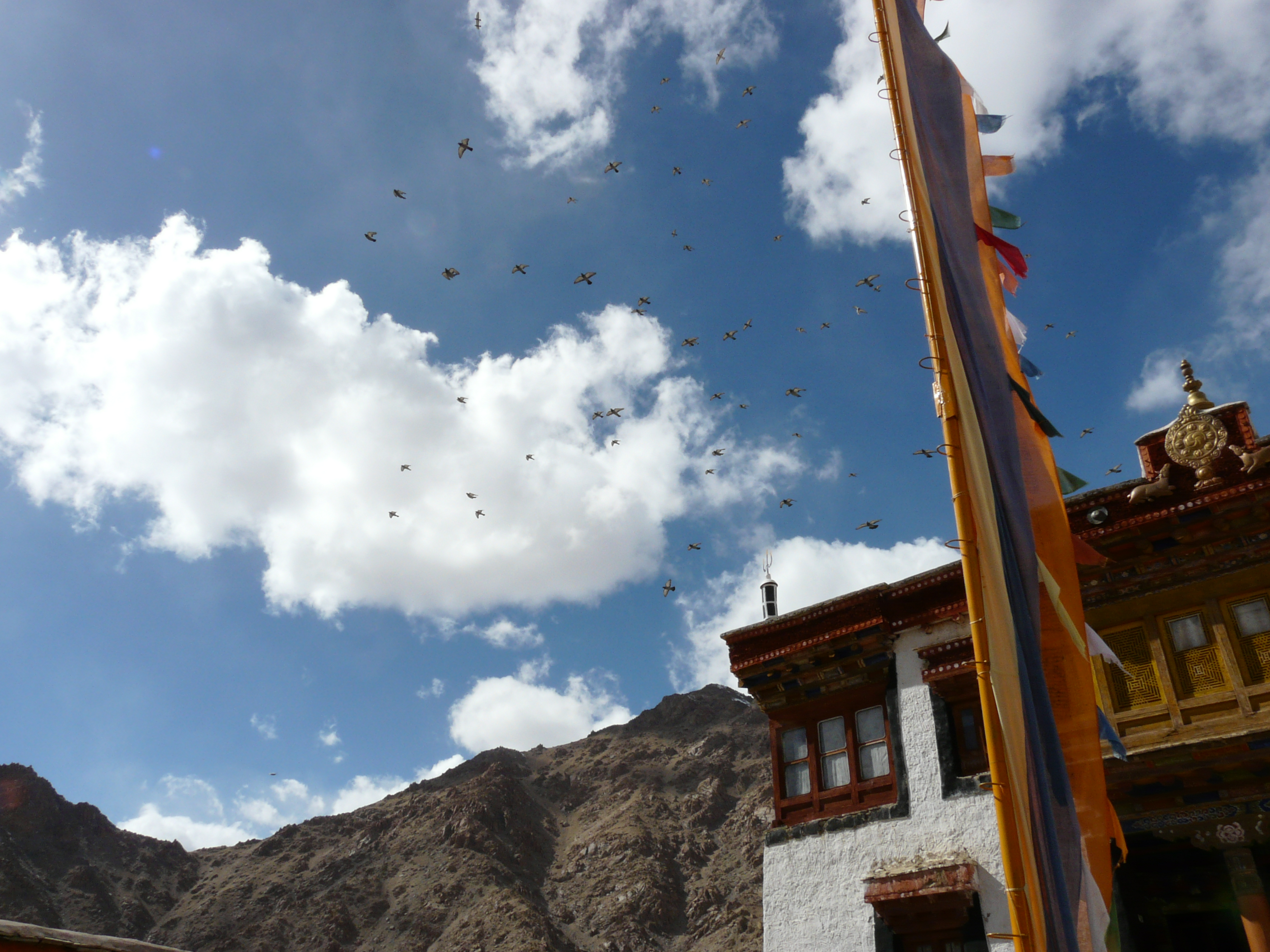

== See also ==
- List of buddhist monasteries in Ladakh
- Tourism in Ladakh
