= Lungser Kangri =

Mountain in India

Coordinates: 32.93147°N 78.45680°E

- Location within India

Highest point
- Elevation: 6,666 m (21,870 ft)
- Prominence: 1,468 m (4,816 ft)

Geography
- Location: Ladakh, India
- Parent range: Himalayas

Climbing
- First ascent: 1995 by Harish Kapadia
- Easiest route: Karzok

Lungser Kangri is a mountain located in Ladakh, India.

The mountain is located near the lake Tso Moriri and the village Karzok. It is 6,666 metres (21,870 ft) high, making it the tallest mountain in the Rupshu area, as well as the second highest in the Mangrik area, which is located in the southern part of Ladakh county. The mountain is accessible from Markha Valley. It has been described as relatively easy to climb considering how high it is, not requiring crampons or ice axes.
