= More plains =

Plateau in India

Coordinates: 33.2000°N 77.8000°E

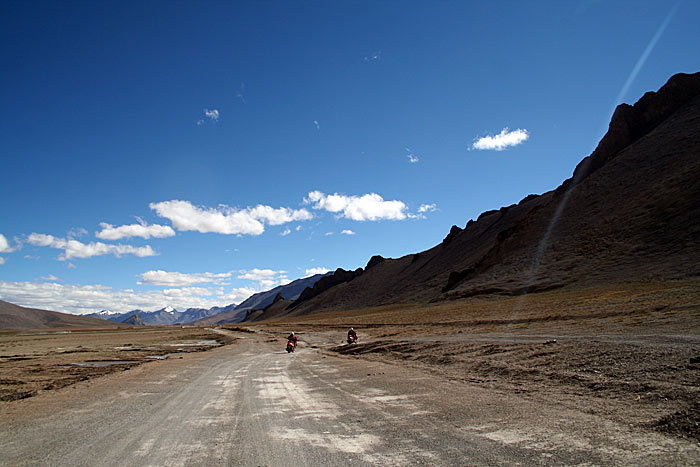
Straight stretches of the More Plains.

More plains, originally called Kiang Chu Thang in the local language, is a plateau on the Leh–Manali Highway. Kiang Chu Thang means a plain where the kiang (Tibetan wild ass) does not find water. It occupies 40 km of the highway between Leh and Pang. The plateau has an average elevation of 4,800 metres. The road is flanked by beautiful mountains on both sides. At some places, it runs along the Sumkhel Lungpa River, featuring stunning sand and rock natural formations.

== Geography ==
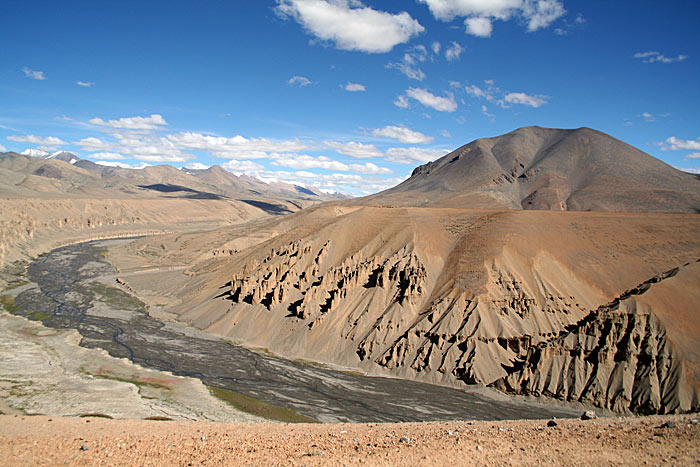
Natural Rock and Sand Formations along the Sumkhel Lungpa River.

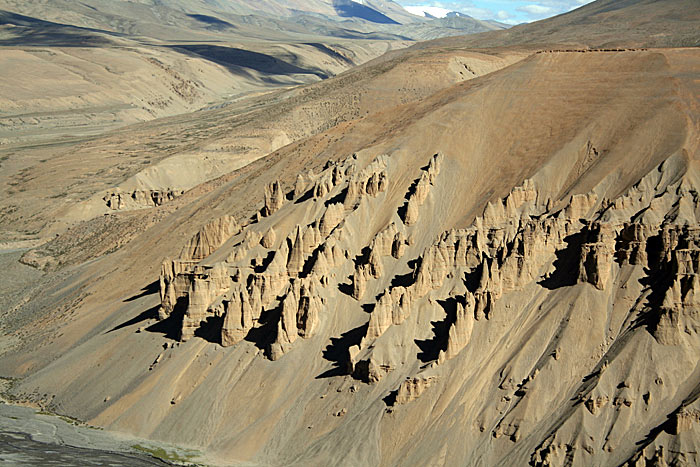
Natural Rock and Sand Formations along the Sumkhel Lungpa River.

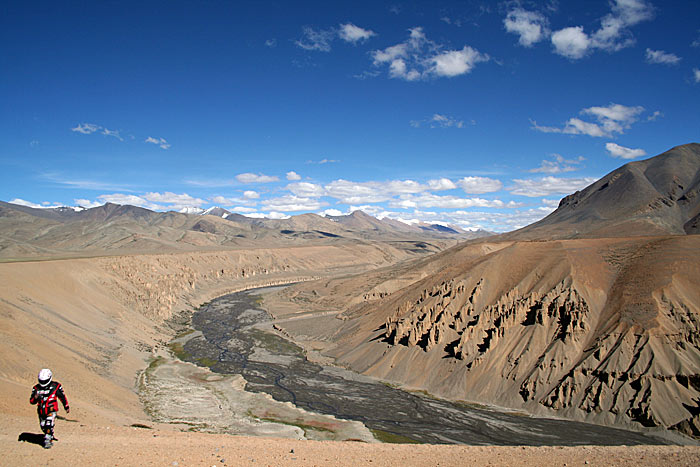
Natural Rock and Sand Formations along the Sumkhel Lungpa River.

More plains pool, a high-altitude wetland complex comprising two interconnected lakes, larger hypersaline Tso Kar and smaller freshwater Startsapuk Tso, is a Ramsar wetland site in India, found at more than 4,500 metres above sea level in the Changthang plateau of Ladakh. The primary source of lakes is glacial meltwater. It is one of the most important breeding areas in India for the black-necked crane (Grus nigricollis). Some of the species found here are endangered saker falcon (Falco cherrug) and Asiatic wild dog or dhole (Cuon alpinus laniger), and the vulnerable snow leopard (Panthera uncia).

The Tso Kar is connected by an inlet stream at its south-west end to a small lake, Startsapuk Tso, and together they form the 9 km^{2} More plains pool, which is dominated by the peaks of two mountains, Thugje (6050 m) and Gursan (6370 m). From the geology of the More Plains, it can be concluded that the Tso Kar in historical times ranged up to this high valley. Until a few years ago the lake was an important source of salt, which the Changpa nomads used to export to Tibet. The nomadic settlement of Thugje is located 3 km in the north. There is a tented camp on the west bank of the lake which provides accommodation for tourists.

In relation to Tso Kar, other places in Changtang plateau are Miru (Meroo) on Leh–Manali Highway to the northwest, Pongunagu on northwest shore, Thukje on northeast shore, Giu (not to be confused with Gya which lies north of Miroo) on western shore and Chutak on southwest shore.

== Transport ==
The plain area starts after covering around 4 km uphill road from Pang towards Tanglang La pass. The road to this area is mostly on the plain for approximately 35 km, before it again starts to rise to Tanglang La. This area is a major attraction to bikers heading towards Leh from Manali. The Border Roads Organisation (BRO) of Indian Army has converted the road to two lanes, one in each direction.

== Gallery ==
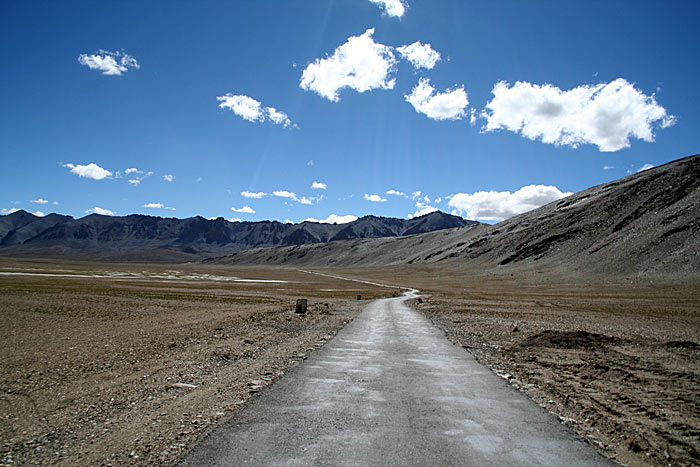
Straight stretches of the More Plains.

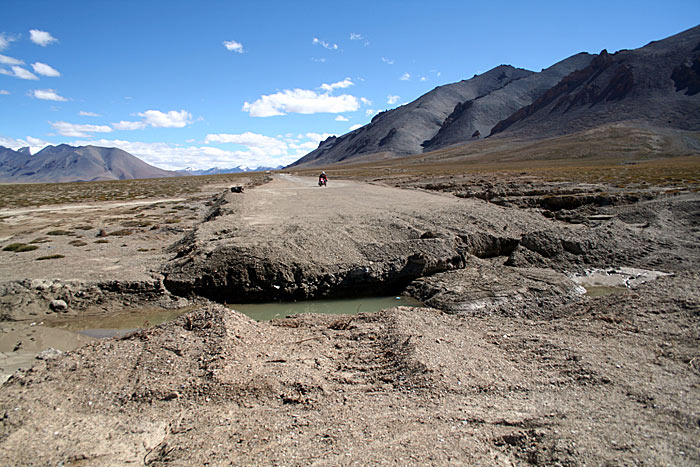
Unexpected breaks in the plains, you make your own road.

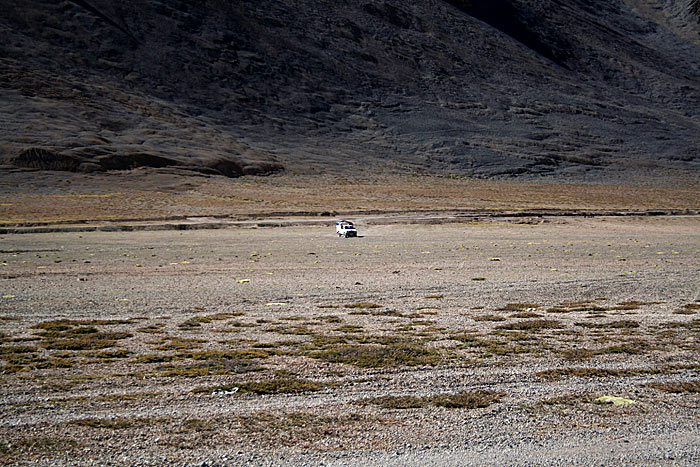
A four-wheel drive vehicle taken with a 300 mm telephoto lens shows the vast expanse of More plains and the size of the mountains that flank it.

== See also ==
- Changthang Plateau lakes

- More plains pool

- Tso Kar
- Startsapuk Tso

- Salt Valley

- Kyago Tso (Kyagar Tso)
- Tso Moriri

- Other lakes in Changthang Plateau

- Chilling Tso
- Ryul Tso

- Kailash Range lakes

- Pangong Tso
- Spanggur Tso

- Ladakh

- Geography of Ladakh
- Tourism in Ladakh

- General

- Soda lake
- Salt Valley
