= Tso Kar =

Ramsar wetland in India

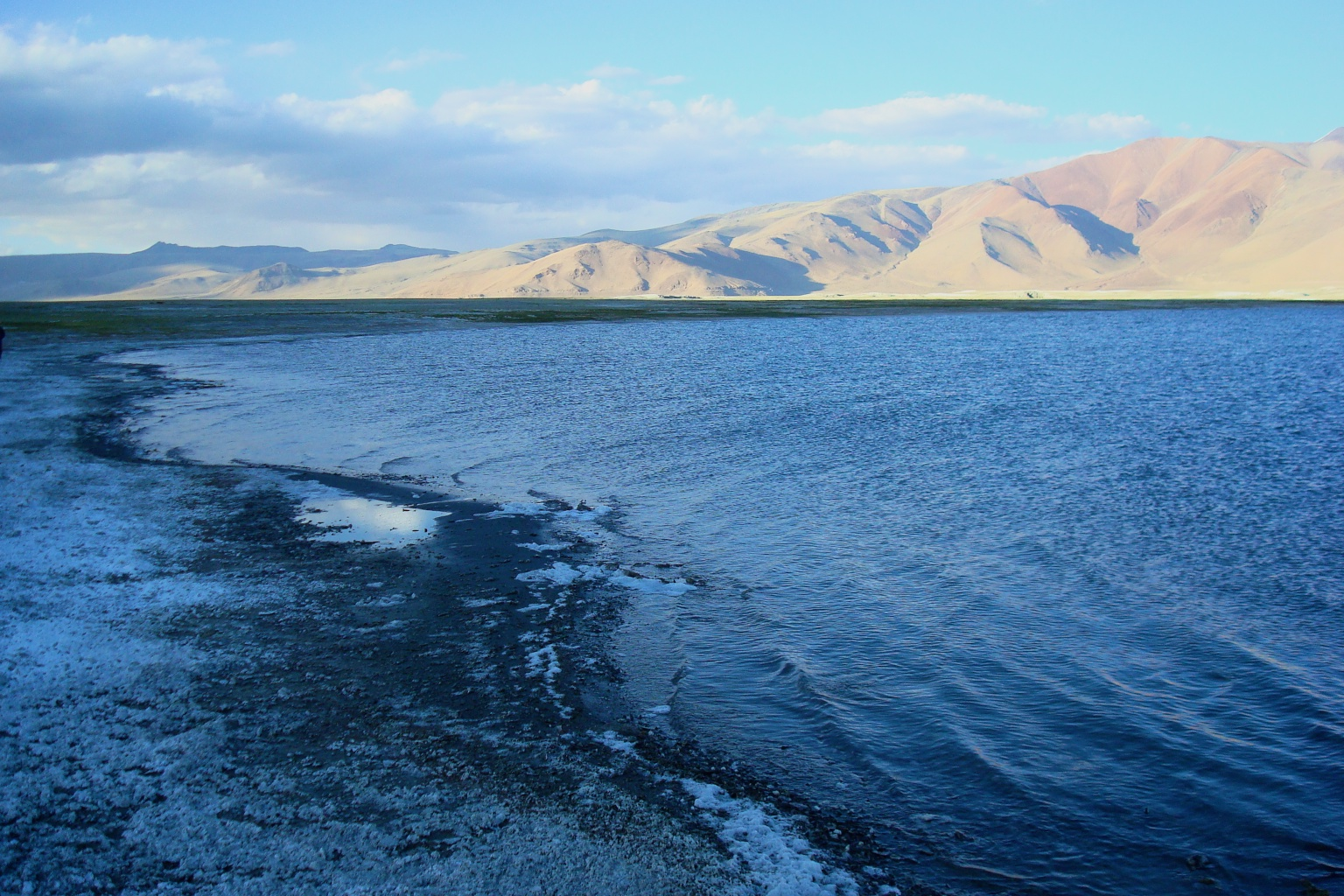
- View of Tso Kar in Leh district (Ladakh)

- Location within Ladakh
- Location: Leh district, Ladakh, India
- Coordinates: 33°18′N 77°59′E
- Type: Oligotrophic lake
- Primary inflows: Pholokongka Chu
- Primary outflows: none
- Max. length: 7.5 kilometres (4.7 mi)
- Max. width: 2.3 kilometres (1.4 mi)
- Surface area: 22 km^{2} (8.5 sq mi)
- Surface elevation: 4,530 metres (14,860 ft)

Ramsar Wetland
- Official name: Tso Kar Wetland Complex
- Designated: 17 November 2020
- Reference no.: 2443

The Tso Kar or Tsho kar is a fluctuating salt lake known for its size and depth situated in the Rupshu Plateau and valley in Changthang district in the southern part in Union Territory of Ladakh in India.It is located 102 km from Leh City, the capital of Ladakh. It is also recognised as India's 42nd Ramsar site.

== Etymology ==
The name Tso Kar refers to the white salt efflorescence on the margins of the lake caused by the evaporation of the saline waters.

== Geography ==
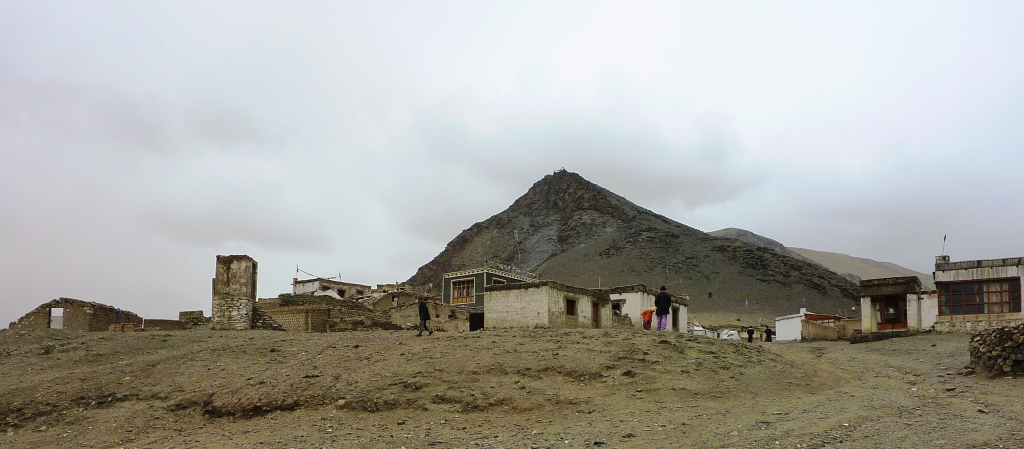
Tsokar settlement. 2010

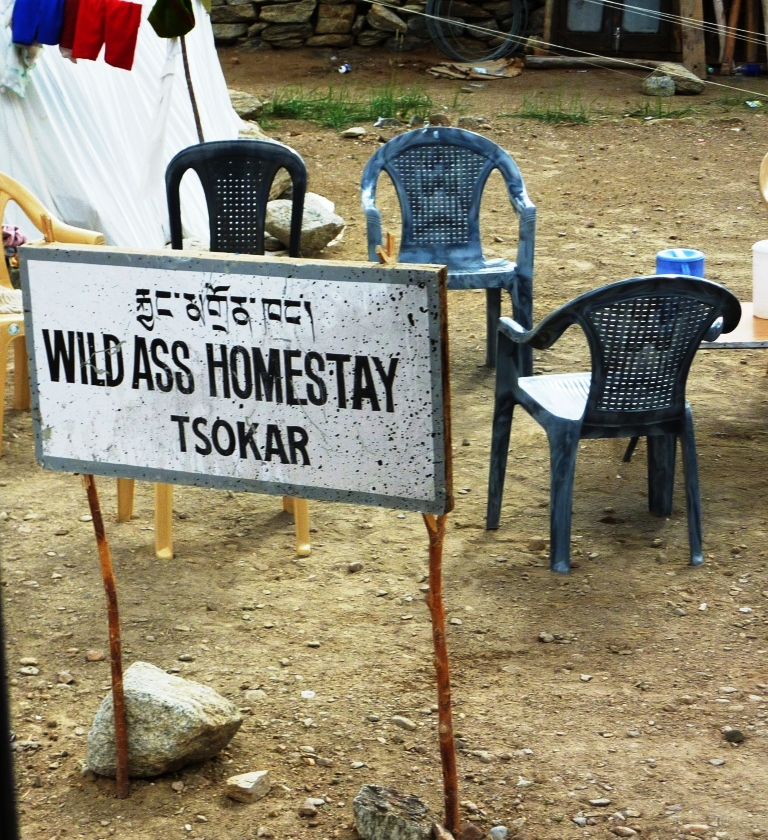
Wildass Homestay, Tsokar Lake. 2010

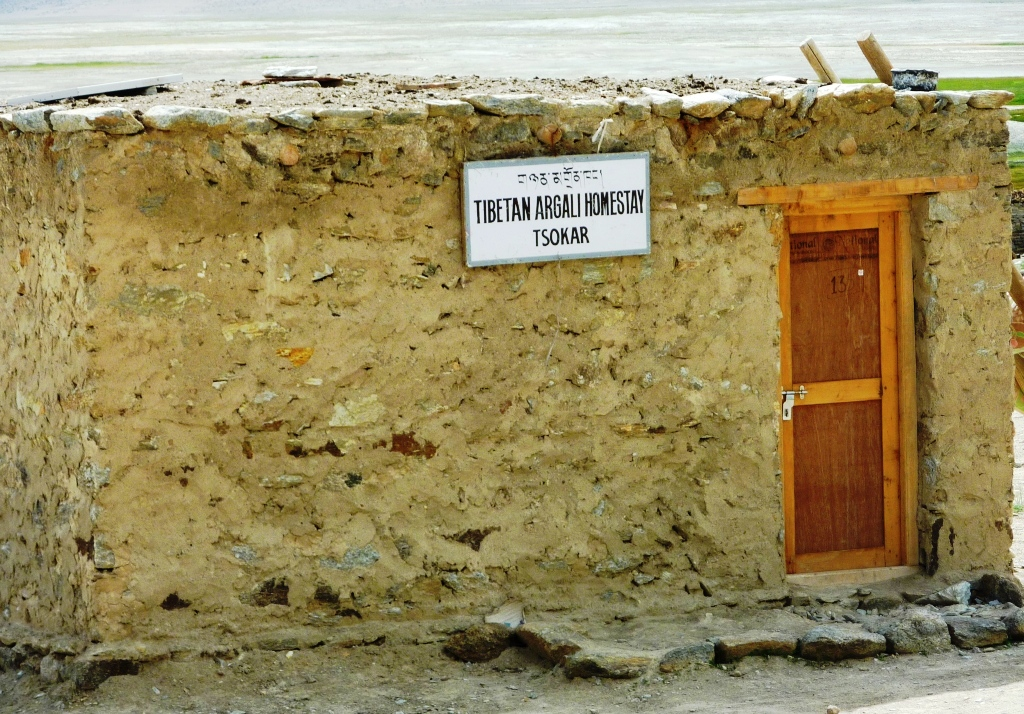
Tibetan Argali Homestay, Tsokar

The Tso Kar is connected by an inlet stream at its south-west end to a small lake, Startsapuk Tso, and together they form the 9 km^{2} More plains pool, which is dominated by the peaks of two mountains, Thugje (6050 m) and Gursan (6370 m). From the geology of the More Plains, it can be concluded that the Tso Kar in historical times ranged up to this high valley. Until a few years ago the lake was an important source of salt, which the Changpa nomads used to export to Tibet. The nomadic settlement of Thugje is located 3 km in the north. There is a tented camp on the west bank of the lake which provides accommodation for tourists. More plains pool (Tso Kar-Startsapuk Tso) Ramsar wetland site in India is a high-altitude wetland complex, found at more than 4,500 metres above sea level in the Changthang region of Ladakh. It includes two connected lakes, the freshwater Startsapuk Tso and the larger hypersaline Tso Kar. The primary source of lakes is glacial meltwater.

In relation to Tso Kar, other places in Changtang plateau are Miru (Meroo) on Leh–Manali Highway to the northwest, Pongunagu on northwest shore, Thukje on northeast shore, Giu (not to be confused with Gya which lies north of Miroo) on western shore and Chutak on southwest shore.

== Climate ==
Due to the high altitude, the climate is extreme in the winter; temperatures below -40 °C (-40 °F) are not uncommon. In the summer the temperature rises above 30 °C (86 °F), with extreme fluctuations during the day. Precipitation in the form of either rain or snow is extremely rare.

== Ecology ==
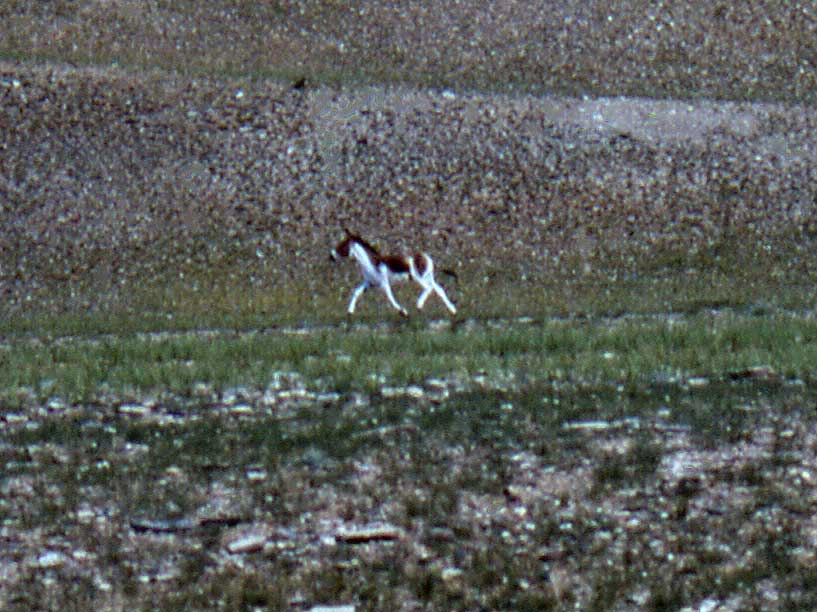
Wild kiang near Tso Kar Lake

=== Flora ===
The inlets of the Tso Kar are a source of non-saline water; pondweeds and basic nettles grow there, forming floating islands of vegetation in the spring and dying off in the winter. Sedge and large numbers of buttercups grow on the shores of Startsapuk Tso and of the tributaries of the Tso Kar, while some parts of the high basin are marked by steppe vegetation interspersed with tragacanth and pea bushes. The shore of Tso Kar is partly covered with a salt crust, which keeps vegetation away from the inflows.

=== Fauna ===
Tso Kar is an important stopover ground for migratory birds along the Central Asian Flyway. It is one of the most important breeding areas in India for the black-necked crane (Grus nigricollis). Some of the species found here are endangered saker falcon (Falco cherrug) and Asiatic wild dog or dhole (Cuon alpinus laniger), and the vulnerable snow leopard (Panthera uncia).

Due to the salinity of the Tso Kar, most of the resident fauna is found in its tributaries and in Startsapuk Tso. There are large breeding colonies of grebes and brown-headed gulls, and some bar-headed geese, ruddy shelducks and terns. In the vicinity of the lake black-necked cranes and Tibetan grouse are relatively common.

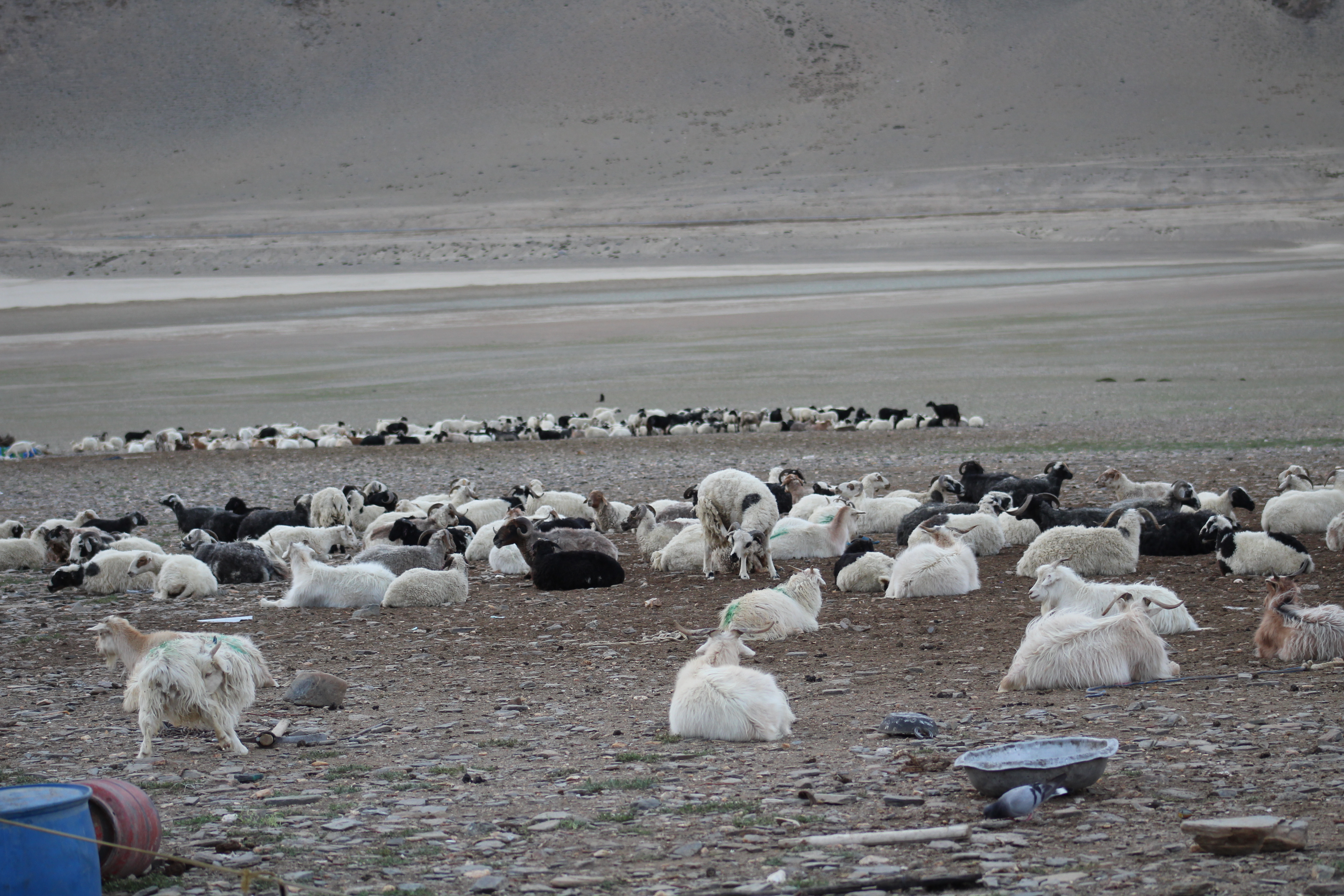
Resting sheep and goats in Changthang, Ladakh

The basin of the Tso Kar and the adjoining More Plains constitute one of the most important habitats of the kiang, Tibetan gazelles, Tibetan wolves and foxes; there are himalayan marmots in the higher reaches. Yaks, horses, sheep, and goats are kept by nomads.

=== Conservation ===
The Tso Kar Wetland Complex in the Changthang region of Ladakh was designated as India's 42nd Ramsar Site in December 2020. The complex comprises two principal water bodies: Startsapuk Tso, a freshwater lake of approximately 438 hectares to the south, and Tso Kar, a hypersaline lake of approximately 1,800 hectares to the north.

The Tso Kar Basin is an A1 Category Important Bird Area (IBA) and a key staging site along the Central Asian Flyway. It is one of India's most important breeding locations for the black-necked crane (Grus nigricollis) and supports breeding populations of the great crested grebe (Podiceps cristatus), bar-headed goose (Anser indicus), ruddy shelduck (Tadorna ferruginea), brown-headed gull (Chroicocephalus brunnicephalus), and lesser sand plover (Charadrius mongolus).

== ISRO station ==
Human Outer Planet Exploration (HOPE) station at Tso Kar, developed by Indian Space Research Organisation (ISRO) and Bengaluru-based space tech company Protoplanet for India’s human space exploration, is a space analogue station, which mimics conditions on the Moon and Mars and aimed at carrying out "research for future crewed interplanetary journeys". This location was selected because it has conditions which are "closest to a planet or planetary body with regard to the topography, environment, etc. These stations usually act as testing grounds for relevant technologies, help advance technology readiness levels (TRL) and engineering integration, and facilitate human studies, crew training and research around geological, geomorphological, habitability, and life detection." There are 33 such stations across the world. In August 2025, India began its first ever space simulation at this station in which 2 crew in space suit stayed inside the station for the further research and development.

Indian Astronomical Observatory at Hanle is another space exploration station in Ladakh.

== Transport ==
The Tso Kar lies 160 km south of Leh; the Leh Manali road passes 30 km west of it. The lake is 540 km east of Srinagar, the capital of Jammu and Kashmir union territory. From Leh to Tso Kar Lake is 250 kilometers.

From Miru (Meroo) on Leh–Manali Highway, the western and southern shores of Tso Kar can be reached by taking Meroo-Giu-Chutak Road, and the northern and easter shores can be reached by taking Meroo-Pongunagu-Thukje-Mahe-Nyoma road.

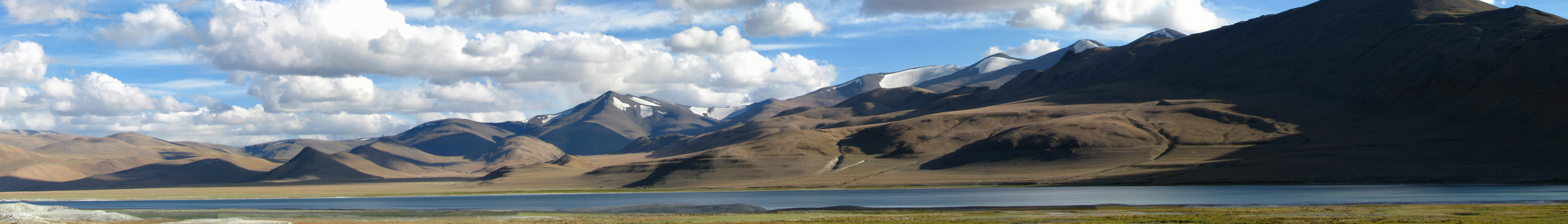
Panoramic view of Tsokar lake.

== See also ==
- Changthang Plateau lakes
  - More plains pool
    - Tso Kar
    - Startsapuk Tso
  - Salt Valley
    - Kyago Tso (Kyagar Tso)
    - Tso Moriri
  - Other lakes in Changthang Plateau
    - Chilling Tso
    - Ryul Tso
- Kailash Range lakes
  - Pangong Tso
  - Spanggur Tso
- Ladakh
  - Geography of Ladakh
  - Tourism in Ladakh
- General
  - Soda lake
  - Salt Valley

== Literature ==
- Kashmir Ladakh Manali – The Essential Guide Partha S. Banerjee, Kolkata: Milestone Books 2010, ISBN 978-81-903270-2-2
