= Chumar =

Chumar ཆུ་མུར་ Chumur
- Town
- Interactive map of Chumar
- Location in Ladakh, India Chumar (India)
- Coordinates: 32.6693°N 78.5954°E
- Country: India
- Union Territory: Ladakh
- District: Changthang
- Tehsil: Nyoma

Government
  - Type: Halqa Panchayat
- Elevation: 5,100 m (16,700 ft)

Languages
  - Official: Ladakhi, Hindi
- Time zone: UTC+5:30 (IST)

Chumar or Chumur (Tibetan: ཆུ་མུར་, Wylie: chu mur) is a town located in south-eastern region of Ladakh and the centre of nomadic grazing. It is in Rupshu block, south of the Tso Moriri lake, on the bank of the Parang River (or Pare Chu), close to Ladakh's border with Tibet. Since 2012, China has disputed the border region situated to the south and southeast of Chumur Town within the Chumur sector. However, the Chumur Town itself is undisputed and remains in India.

Chumar is reachable from east (Hanle and Demchok), north/northwest (Tso Moriri, Karzok, Meroo, Ryul, and Leh), and west/southwest (Kiato, Kaza, Tabo, and Shimla) from the Meroo-Ryul-Hanle-Chumur-Karzok-Kiato road network (including the 125 km long Kiato-Karzok Road from Spiti Valley via Takling La Tunnel).

== Geography ==
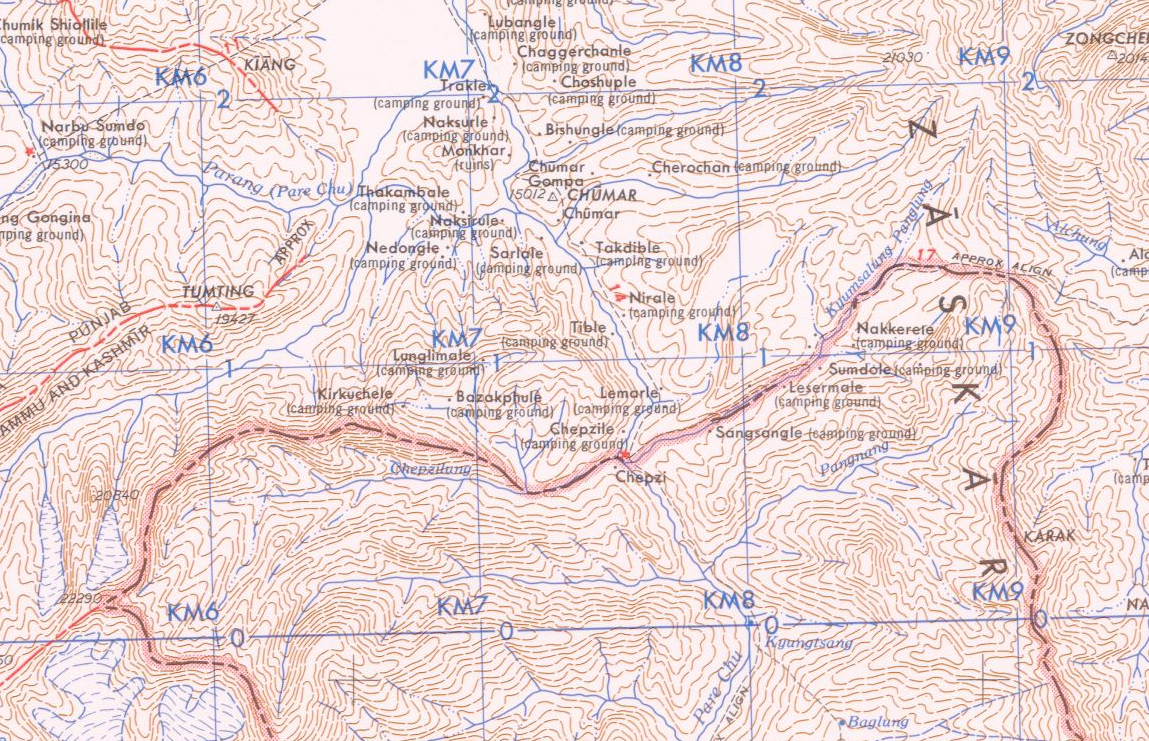
Map 1: Tibet–Ladakh border near Chumar during the British Raj (map by AMS, 1954)

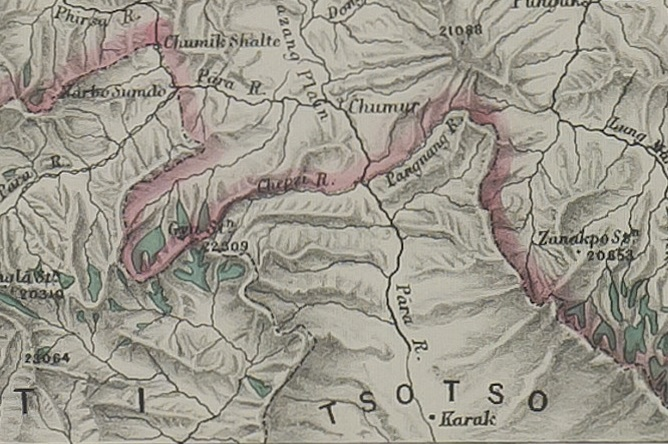
Map 2: Kashmir geologist Frederic Drew's border in 1874

Chumar is along the course of Pare Chu river, close to Ladakh's border with Tibet. The Pare Chu river originates in India's Himachal Pradesh, flows through Ladakh, and turns southeast near Chumar to flow into what the British called the 'Tsotso district' (now Tsosib Sumkyil Township) in Tibet's Tsamda County. After about 80 miles, Pare Chu reenters Himachal Pradesh again to join the Spiti River.

The Chumar settlement itself is in a side valley of Pare Chu, on the bank of a stream, called Chumur Tokpo that flows down from Mount Shinowu. (32.7087°N 78.7273°E). (Note: Mount Shinowu (Chinese: 斯诺乌山; pinyin: Sī nuò wū shān) is a Chinese name of the peak. On Tibetan maps, the name is written as "Seru'Ur Ri" or "Zeru'Uri". British Indian maps do not give it a name but mark it as a peak of 21,030 feet (6,410 m) elevation.) There is also a historic gompa (Buddhist temple) near the village and a Chumur monastery further upstream. Along the course of Pare Chu and its tributary streams are numerous pastures and campgrounds utilised by the pastoral nomads of Rupshu. Some of them close to Pare Chu are listed as Sarlale, Takdible, Nirale, Tible, Lemarle and Chepzile.

The Chepzile campground is near a small hamlet called Chepzi which boasts some farmlands. Two tributaries join Pare Chu near the hamlet: Chepzilung (or Chepzi stream) from the west and Tegopagna (also called Kyumsalung Panglung) (Note: Kyumsalung Panglung is marked on the survey map (Map 1). Frederic Drew called it just Panglung (Map 2). The current Chinese name Chinese: 倒帮那; pinyin: Dào bāng nà is similar to the original name Tegopagna.) stream from the east. Chepzilung originates below the Gya Peak, a key point on the border between Spiti (Himachal Pradesh) and Tibet. According to the map drawn by Frederic Drew, who worked as a geologist in the administration of Jammu and Kashmir, these two tributaries were border rivers of Ladakh. The notes to the map he provided state that the subjects of Jammu and Kashmir grazed their cattle in the pasturelands up to the boundary, while the subjects of Tibet did likewise on their side. (Map 2)

=== Indian boundary definition ===
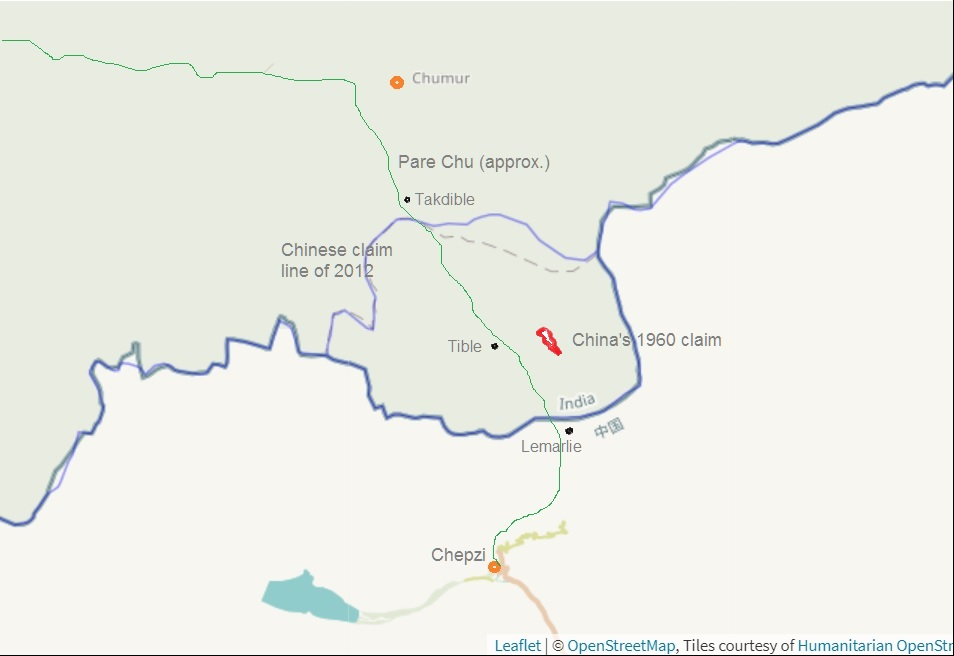
Map 3: Chinese and Indian claim lines in the Chumar Sector in 2012

By the time of Indian independence in 1947, the Indian administration appears to have conceded part of the valley of Chepzilung to the Tibetans. (Note: See the map by the US Army Map Service (AMS), which is based on the Survey of India maps from 1945.) When independent India defined its boundaries in 1954, it also withdrew from the Tegopagna river to the east of Chepzi, and set the watershed ridge between Chumur Tokpo and Tegopagna as its boundary. On the Pare Chu river itself, the Indian-defined border is five miles south of Chumar, and roughly two miles north of Chepzi. This allows the Tibetan graziers unrestricted access to both the tributary rivers of Pare Chu at Chepzi.

The combined effect of these decisions gave the appearance of a "bulge" in Indian territory near the Pare Chu river. The Indian government justified it on the grounds that the Ladakh's inhabitants had traditionally used the grazing lands along Pare Chu right up to Chepzi.

The people of Chumar claim to have continued to use the farmland and grazing grounds at Chepzi until the recent past. They say that their access to these lands has been blocked by the Chinese People's Liberation Army in recent years. The local nobility family of Rupshu continues to own the farmland and a palace at Chepzi. The Indian Army has said that the Chepzi grazing grounds were "beyond the Indian borders." But the locals are adamant that the Army does not understand their traditional grazing systems.

=== Chinese claims ===
In the 1960 boundary talks with India, China claimed a boundary north of the Indian claim line. However it was still south of the general ridge line running across the Pare Chu valley.

[The border] then follows the mountain ridge southwards... south of the Hanle River up to Mount Shinowu (approximately 32°43′N 78°45′E). It then runs westwards and crosses the Pare River at its junction with a small stream (approximately 32°37′N 78°37′E) to reach the tri-junction of China's Ari [Ngari] district and India's Punjab [now Himachal Pradesh] and Ladakh (approximately 32°31′N 78°24′E).

This border definition not only had the effect of cutting the bulge claimed by India (which followed the natural ridge lines), but it also gave rise to a second disputed area near Mount Shinowu, the source of Chumur Tokpa stream, cutting across the valley of the stream.

By 2012, China was claiming a boundary further north, representing a "bulge" of its own territory, overriding and going beyond its own claim of 1960. (Map 3)

== Sino-Indian border dispute ==
Chumar has been one of the most active areas on the Line of Actual Control (LAC) in terms of interactions between Chinese and Indian troops. Located 190 km northwest of Zanda, it had long been an area of discomfort for the Chinese troops as, until 2014, Chumar had been one of the relatively few places along the Sino-Indian border where the Chinese had no roads near the LAC.

According to Phunchok Stobdan, "In Chumar, China probably wants a straight border from PT (point) 4925 to PT 5318 to bring the Tible-Mane area under its control", in essence removing the bulge along the LAC at Chumar. The Chinese opened up this new front of the border dispute in Chumar in 2012, prior to that, the border here was the International Border and not the Line of Actual Control.

As part of the resolution to the 2013 Depsang standoff, the Indian side agreed to take down some bunkers in Chumar in return for the Chinese withdrawing from the Depsang standoff area.

A road from Chumar leads up to the LAC. Along this road near the LAC, there is an Indian post at Point 30R, or known simply as 30R. 30R gets its name from being at a sharp elevation of 30 metres as compared to its surroundings. PLA patrols often come up to 30R. However they are at a tactical disadvantage since vehicles cannot come up to 30R; they have even tried using horses to enter the area. The Chinese have tried constructing a road across 30R, including in 2014 when they claimed they had orders to build a road till Tible, but they have been stopped from doing so by India. During the 2014 standoff here, Chinese troops had also positioned themselves on 30R, and had even heavy machinery with them for road construction. Chinese troops have also been reported to have removed Indian surveillance cameras from the area. The 2014 faceoff at Chumar, which started on 10 September, started days before the Chinese leader Xi Jinping visited India and continued even as he was in India. Indian media quoting army source said that nearly 1000 Chinese soldiers had entered Indian territory in the Chumur sector on the day Xi was in India.

== Transport and connectivity ==
Chumar is connected by motorable roads to Ryul Tso nearly 50 km in the north, Hanle nearly 100 km in the east, Tso Moriri nearly 60 km north, Meroo on NH-3 nearly 225 km north.

- Hanle-Royul-Chumar Road (all-weather operational since 2025 including for the tourists): The 91 km black-topped all-weather motorable route, traverses from Hanle in the east to Chumar in the west. This road passes by the Ryul Tso and reaches its peak elevation of 17,200 ft at Salsal La, both of which are approximately 50 km north of Chumar. The Border Roads Organisation (BRO) completed this project in September 2025 and opened this dual-use military road for the use of civilian ourists. The road connects several tourist attractions, such as Indian Astronomical Observatory (IAO) at Hanle and various lakes of Salt Valley in Rupshu sub-plateau of Changthang plateau, such as the Ryul Tso, Kyun Tso (Chilling Tso), Tso Moriri, etc along the way to Chumar.

- Chumar-Pooh-Kharcham-Harsil Route (under-construction) upgrade entails the construction of following missing sections. Since, construction of these roads requires cutting through multiple mountain passes, no target completion date has been set.
  - Chumar-Pooh Road, ~150 km long road from Chumar in Ladakh to Pooh (18 km from China border) in Himachal Pradesh costing Rs2,500-3,000 crore, was approved by the BRO in 2020 under the India–China Border Roads (ICBR). It will cut present 720 km distance to 150 km allowing faster movement of troops.
  - Karcham-Harsil Road, another ~150 km long road which will cut the present 450 km distance to 150 km is being consturtced by the BRO.
- Internet: In early 2025, high-speed public 4G/5G mobile and internet connectivity was made available by India.

== See also ==
- Parang River
- List of disputed territories of India
- Line of Actual Control
- Demchok sector
- 2013 Depsang standoff

== Bibliography ==
- India, Ministry of External Affairs, ed. (1962), Report of the Officials of the Governments of India and the People's Republic of China on the Boundary Question, Government of India Press
  - Indian Report: Part 1 (PDF); Part 2 (PDF); Part 3 (PDF); Part 4 (PDF)
  - Chinese report: Part 1 (PDF); Part 2 (PDF); Part 3 (PDF);
- Gazetteer of Kashmir and Ladak, Calcutta: Superintendent of Government Printing, 1890
- Cunningham, Alexander (1854), Ladak: Physical, Statistical, Historical, London: Wm. H. Allen and Co – via archive.org
- Drew, Frederic (1875), The Jummoo and Kashmir Territories: A Geographical Account, E. Stanford – via archive.org
- Koshal, Sanyukta (2001), Ploughshares of Gods, Ladakh: Land, agriculture, and folk traditions, Om Publications, ISBN 978-81-86867-46-4
- Strachey, Henry (1854), Physical Geography of Western Tibet, London: William Clows and Sons – via archive.org
