= Salt Valley =

Valley in Ladakh, India

The Salt Valley is a wide open area in the Rupshu region, a valley in southeast Ladakh, India. The valley has a length of about 20 km and a maximum width of about 7 km. Its average elevation is 5,000 m. It can be approached from Leh across the Tanglang La pass.

== Geography ==
The salt valley and wide area around it, all fall in the Changthang plateau, which also has the following geographical features:

The region south of Sumdo and Kyagar La (also known as Namshang La), is referred to as the Salt Valley or Salt Lake Valley due to the salt plains along the northern shore of Tso Moriri and the area surrounding the Kyagar Tso - both of which are salt lakes.

Immediate north of Salt Valley is the Puga Valley, an area from the Polokongka La to Puga village and Sumdo, which also has the hot springs and mud pools.

Immediate south of Salt Valley is Karzok village and Tso Morriri.

Immediate east of Salt Valley is Karzok Kangri (6,110m/20,046ft a.s.l.) - a glaciated mountain peak.

Immediate west of Salt Valley and northeast of Tso Morriri is the glaciated Shasang (Shashang) mountain peak is a mountain located north of Tso Moriri Lake.

Immediate west of Salt Valley is the Spangnak Ri 6,390 m / 20,960 ft) glaciated mountain peak which is located in the far west of the Transhimalaya mountain range. South of Spangnak Ri is the Korzok Kangri (6090m) mountain peak. Further west of Spangnak Ri are the twin glaciated peaks of Yalung Nong and the Yalung Nong South (6 080m/19 948ft a.s.l.). The climb to the 6080m summit of Yalung Nong, classified as a trekking peak, begins at Gyamar base camp and follows the South-West side for approximately 5 km, with a 900m elevation gain. The summit offers views of the Tso Moriri region, including the Mentok Kangri range and Chamser and Lungser Kangri. This climb can be added as an extra 8th day to the 7-day Rumtse to Tso Moriri trek by spending two nights in Gyamar. Immediate south of Spangnak Ri, as well as northwest of Karozok village and northwest of Tso Morriri, is the Karzok Kangri (6,110m/20,046ft, also called Korzok Kangri) - a glaciated mountain peak.

== Transport ==
Tso Kyago in Salt Valley is reachable by "Miroo-Puga-Sumdo-Mahe Road" (MPSM Road) which begins at NH-3 (Miroo) and ends at Leh-Nyoma Road (Mahe). Traveling south from Sumdo along the 40 km "Sumdo-Karzok Road", Tso Kyago is situated approximately 15 km south, while the Karzok at the southern end of this route is about 40 km from Sumdo.

Kiato-Karzok Road (partially overlaps with the Hanle-Kaza-Tabo Road), connecting Kiato village (between Kiamo and Pangmo-Kaza in Spiti Valley in Himachal Pradesh, not to be confused with Key) in the south to the Karzok village (on the banks of Tso Morriri in Ladakh) in the north via the Takling La (5575 m or 18,290 ft, near the border of Ladakh, Himachal and Tibet), is a 125 km all-weather road being constructed by the BRO as fourth alternative route to Ladakh. After completing the initial survey, the BRO has invited the bids in April 2025 for preparing DPR for the road and Takling La tunnel. It will connect the Karzok, Nurbo, Sumdo, Parangla and Kaza, and provide the strategic shortest military access to Chumar, Nyoma, and Demchok from the mainland India. Kyago Tso is another 10-15 km north from Karzok.

== See also ==
- Changthang Plateau
  - More plains
    - Tso Kar
    - Startsapuk Tso
  - Salt Valley
    - Kyago Tso (Kyagar Tso)
    - Tso Moriri
  - Other lakes in Changthang Plateau
    - Chilling Tso
    - Ryul Tso
- Kailash Range lakes
  - Pangong Tso
  - Spanggur Tso
- Ladakh
  - Geography of Ladakh
  - Tourism in Ladakh
- General
  - Soda lake
  - Salt Valley
