= Kyago Tso =

Lake in Ladakh, India

Kyagar Tso
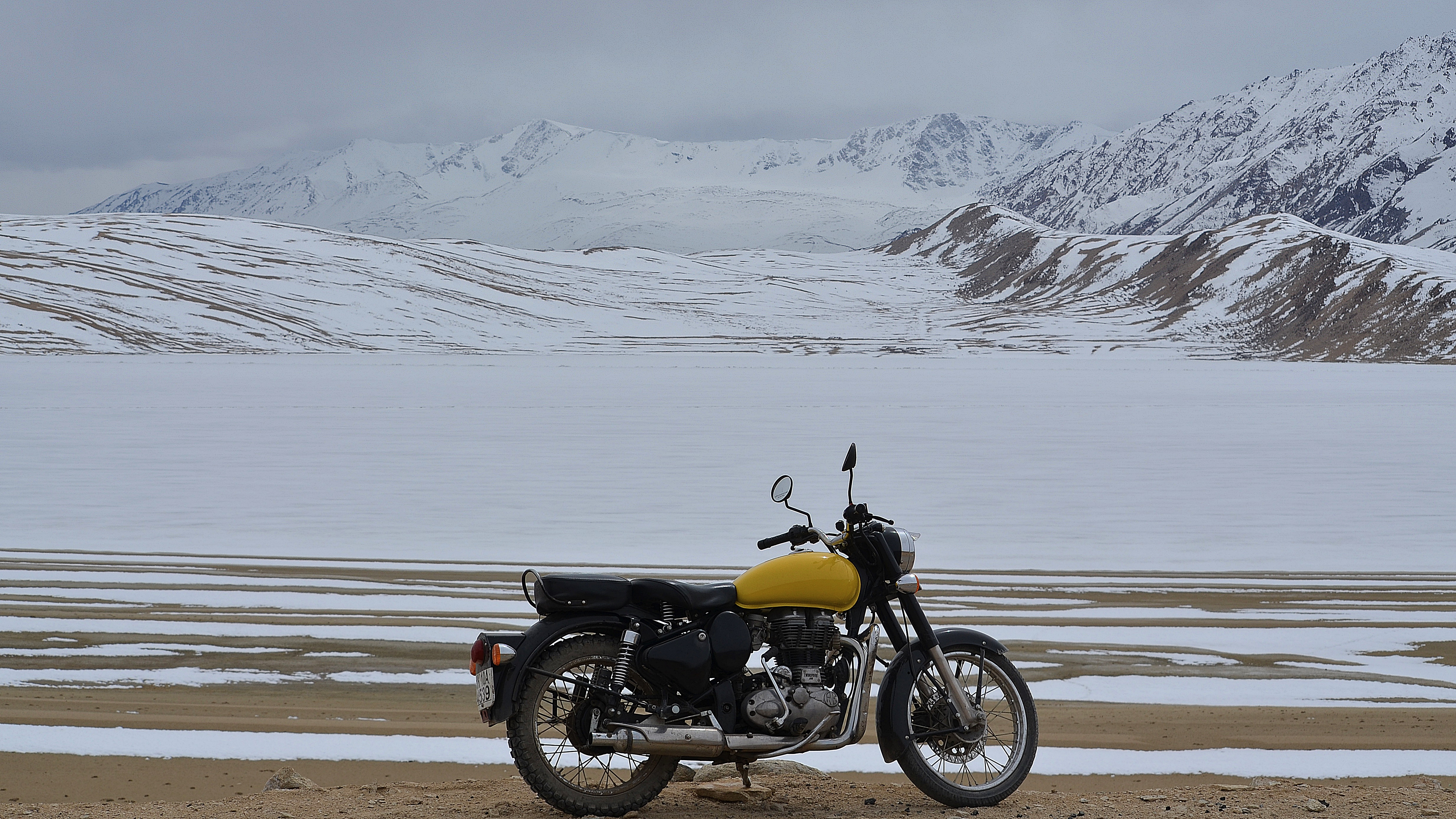
- View of the frozen Kyagar Lake

- Location of Kyagar Lake Kyagar Tso (Ladakh)
- Location: (Ladakh, India), Rutog County (Tibet, China)
- Coordinates: 34.1667°N 77.5833°E
- Basin countries: China, India
- Frozen: during winter

Kyagar Tso or Kyagar Lake is a small brackish lake surrounded by mountains situated in the Ladakh region of the northern Indian Union Territory of Ladakh in India. From afar, it can be spotted by its turquoise colour. It lies in the Salt Valley, which in turn lies south of Puga Valley.

== Geography ==
Kyagar Tso and the area surrounding it falls within the Changthang plateau.

Kyagar Tso a very small saline water lake in the Ladakh at an elevation of 4,705 m (15,436 ft) above the sea level. It lies in the Rupshu Valley in Ladakh at the height of over saltwater lakes at 4,663 m (15,299 ft) above sea level. It lies midway between Manali in Himachal Pradesh to Leh in Jammu and Kashmir.

Kyago La (also known as Namshang La) lies on northeast of Kyago Tso. The area around the Kyagar Tso, from Puga and Sumdo in north to Tso Moriri in the south, is called referred Salt Valley or Salt Lake Valley due to the salt plains around these two salt lakes. Puga Valley is immediate north of Salt Valley.

== Tourism ==
It is observed that there are some bird species in this area.

Kyago Tso is reachable by Miroo-Puga-Sumdo-Mahe road which begins at NH-3 (Miroo) and ends at Leh-Nyoma Road (Mahe), then taking the 40 km long "Sumdo-Kyagy Tso-Karzok Road" from Sumdo. Sumdo is 20 km north and Karzok is 10-15 km south of Kyago Tso.

== Transport ==
See Transport to Changthang Plateau.

== See also ==
- Geography of Ladakh
  - Aksai Chin and its locations
  - Sirijap
  - Khurnak Fort
  - Rudok
  - Changthang Plateau lakes
    - More plains pool
      - Tso Kar
      - Startsapuk Tso
    - Salt Valley
      - Kyago Tso (Kyagar Tso)
      - Tso Moriri
    - Other lakes in Changthang Plateau
      - Chilling Tso
      - Ryul Tso
  - Kailash Range lakes
    - Pangong Tso
    - Spanggur Tso
- General
  - Soda lake
  - Salt Valley
- Tourism in Ladakh
