= Tso Moriri =

Lake in Ladakh, India

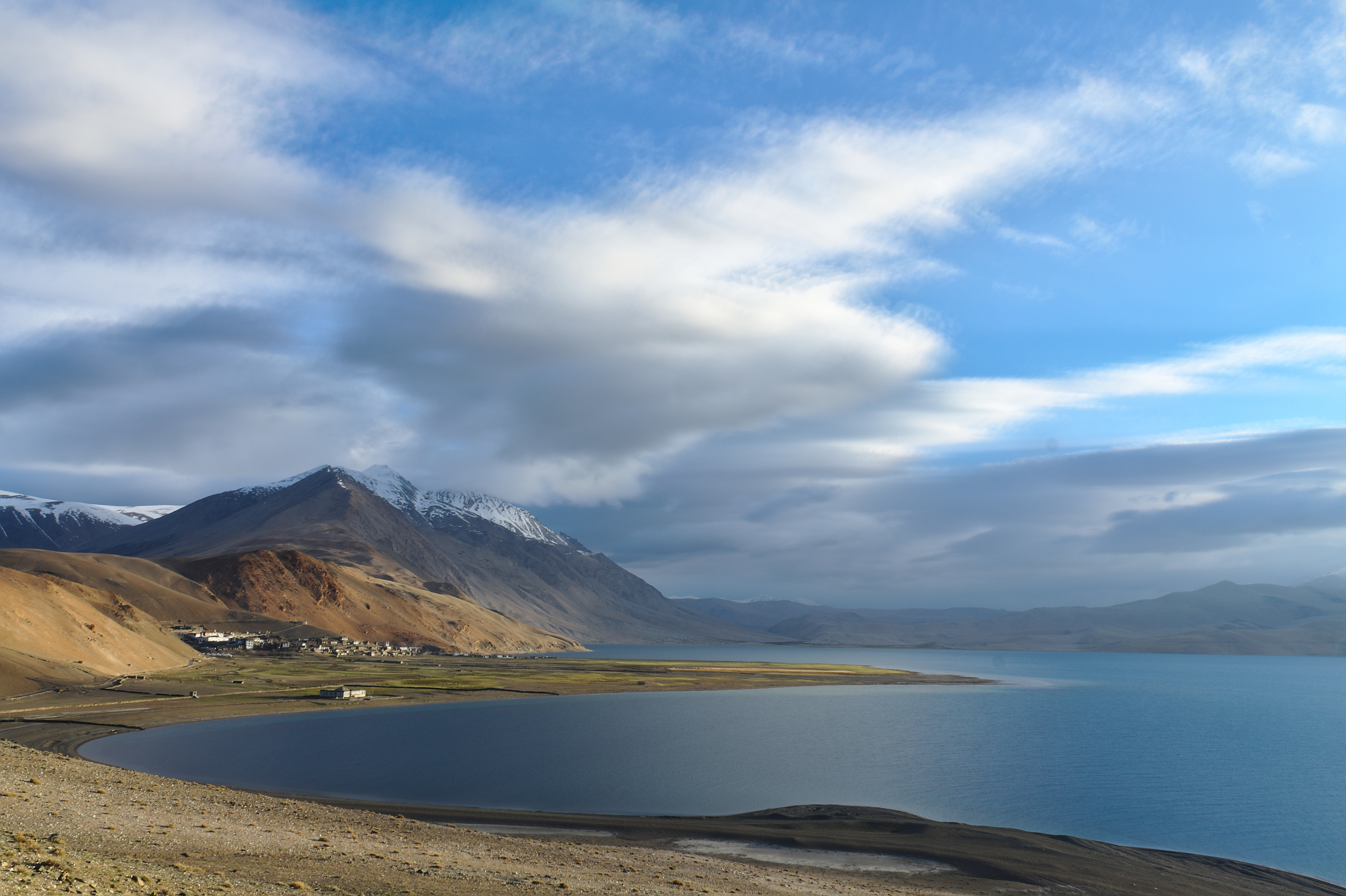
- View of the Tso Moriri Lake in Changthang district (Ladakh)

- Location of Tso Moriri Tso Moriri (India)
- Coordinates: 32°54′N 78°18′E
- Primary inflows: Snow Melt in summer
- Catchment area: 2,298 km^{2} (887 sq mi)
- Basin countries: India
- Designation

Ramsar Wetland
- Official name: Tsomoriri
- Designated: 19 August 2002
- Reference no.: 1213
- Max. length: 26 km (16 mi)
- Max. width: 8 km (5.0 mi)
- Surface area: 13,500 ha (33,000 acres)
- Max. depth: 105 m (344 ft)
- Surface elevation: 4,522 m (14,836 ft)
- Settlements: Korzok

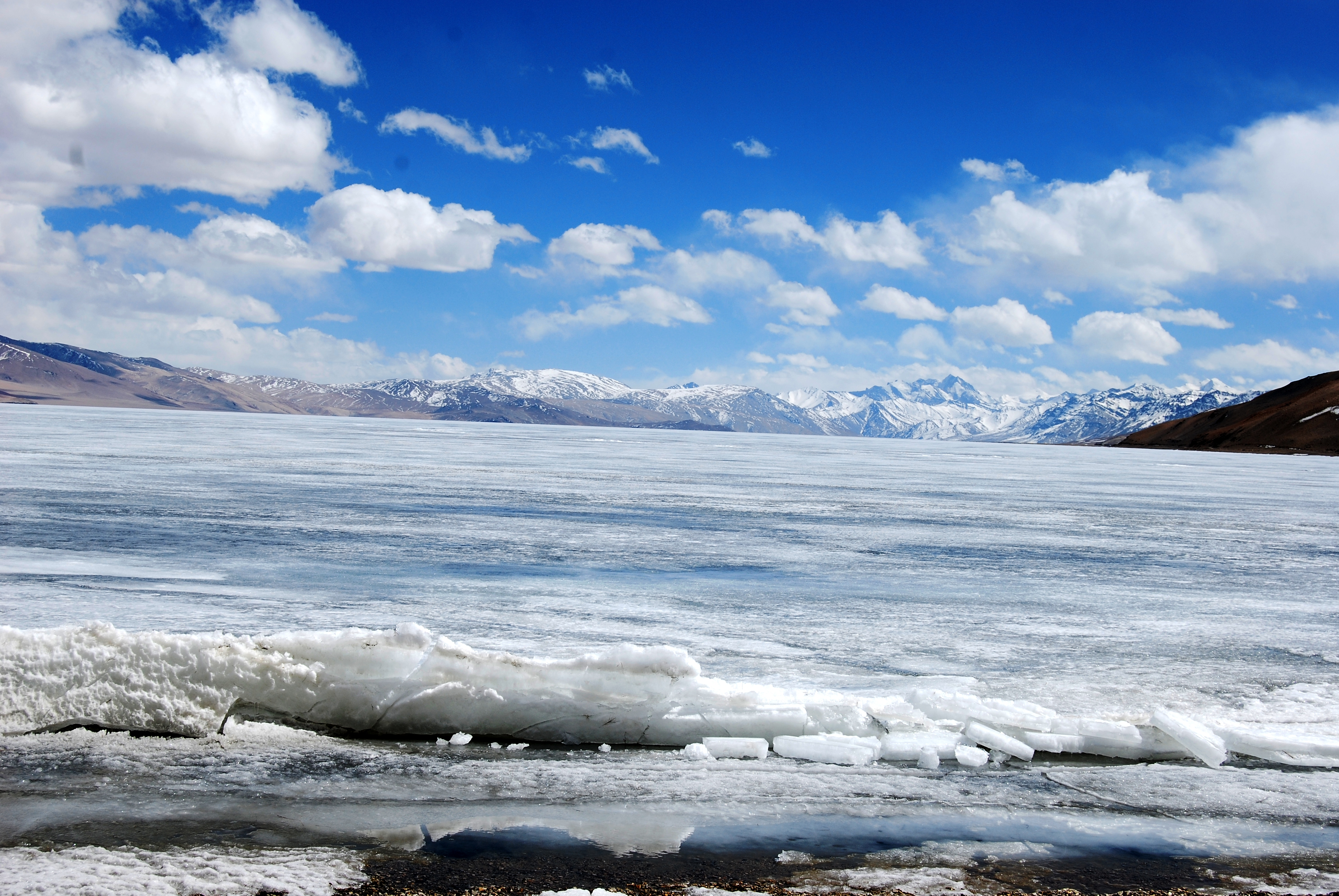
Tso Moriri frozen.

Tso Moriri or Lake Moriri (Tibetan: ལྷ་མོའི་བླ་མཚོ, Wylie: lha mo bla mtsho, 'Mountain Lake'), 4,522 m (14,836 ft), is a high-altitude lake and a Ramsar wetland site in the remote Changthang Plateau (literally: northern plains) in the Changthang district of the union territory of Ladakh in India. As the largest high-altitude lake entirely within India and Ladakh's Trans-Himalayan region, it spans 26 km north-south and 4-8 km wide. The lake is fed by three primary glacial streams - Karzok Phu (west), Gyama Phu (north), and Phirse Phu (southwest) - which form extensive marshes at their deltas. Though now an endorheic lake due to its blocked southern outlet, Tso Moriri maintains slightly brackish yet palatable waters. Its oligotrophic (nutrient-poor), alkaline ecosystem supports unique biodiversity. The area gained protection as the Tso Moriri Wetland Conservation Reserve, though accessibility remains limited mostly to summer months. Year-round settlements exist only at Karzok village (northwest shore) and military outposts along the eastern banks, enduring the extreme high-altitude climate.

The nearest airport is 219 km northwest at Leh City, capital of Ladakh, the nearest rail access will be at Miroo station on the under-construction Bhanupli-Leh line. Road access to Tso Moriri is available from multiple directions: from the north via Sumdo along the (Miroo-Puga-Sumdo-Mahe Road connecting to Sumdo-Karzok Road; from the south through the under-construction Kiato-Karzok Road (125 km) via the high-altitude Takling La Tunnel (5575 m) from Spiti Valley; and from the northeast/east via the Hanle-Ryul-Tegazhung-Chumur Road network.

== Geography ==
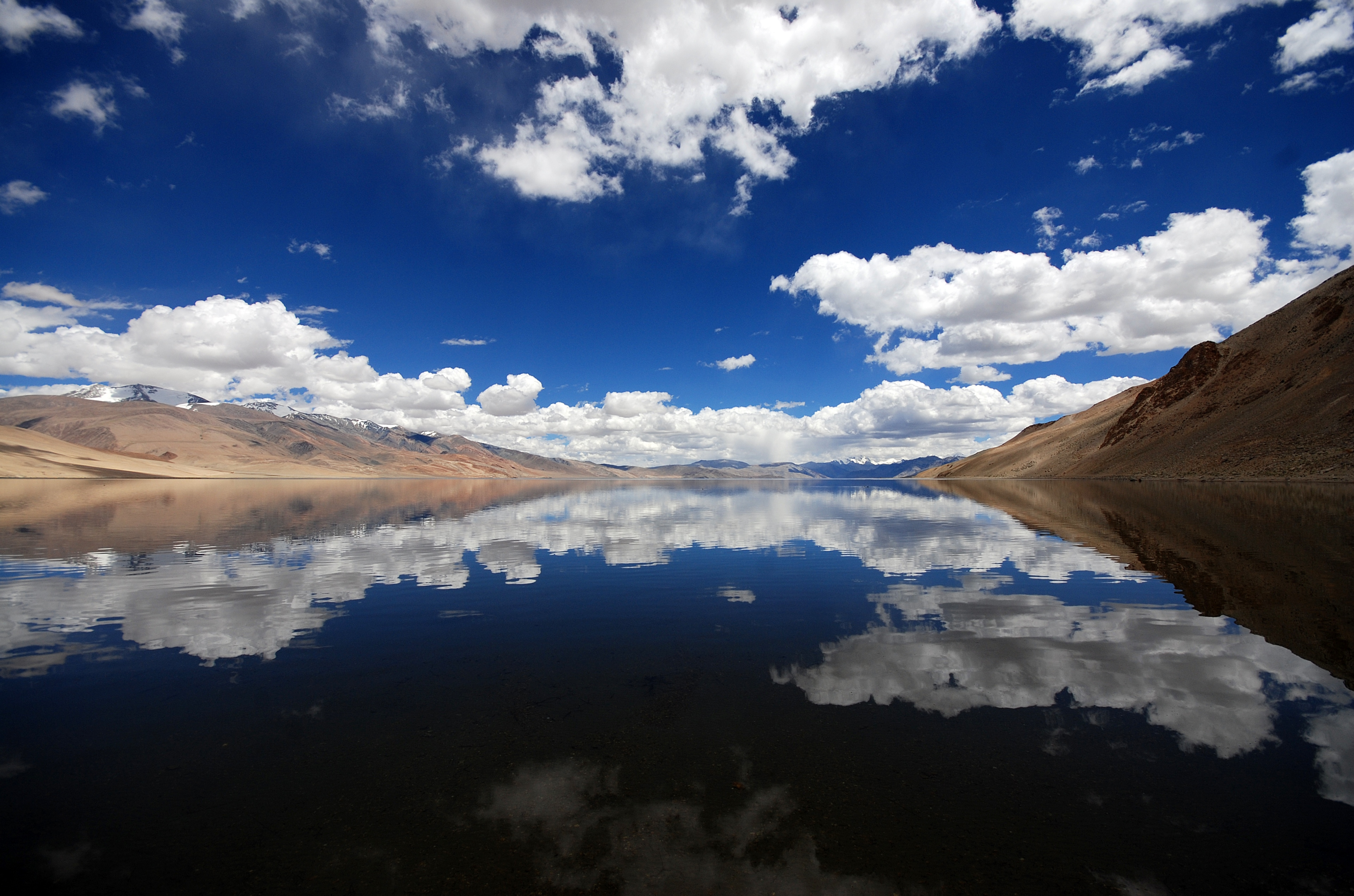
Tso Moriri, Korzok, in Ladakh.

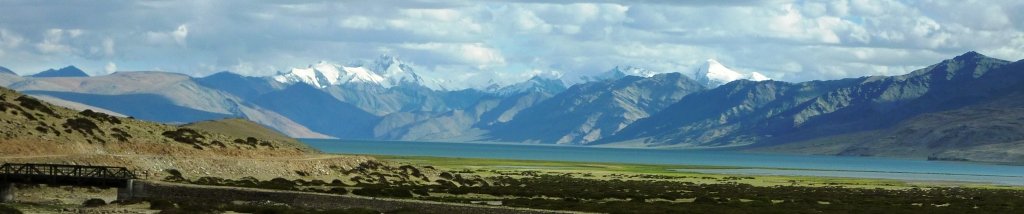
Tso Moriri, Ladakh.

The Changthang Plateau in the eastern Ladakh is an extension of the western Tibetan Plateau that lies above 4,500 m (14,800 ft) msl and supports diverse but low populations of several globally threatened mammals. The lake's drainage area could also be categorised as a basin since it is a closed drainage basin that retains water and allows no outflow to other bodies of water such as rivers or oceans. The Tso Moriri lake is 20 to 50 kilometers southeast of the elevated valley of the core Rupshu Valley and falls within the greater Rupshu Plateau and valley area. The lake, with water spread area of 120 km^{2} (46 sq mi), 26 km north-south and 3-5 km wide, is enclosed by several peaks exceeding 6,000 m (20,000 ft) on both the east and west sides, including Mentok Kangri and Lungser Kangri.

Geologically the Tso Moriri lake is in Ordovician rock. It is bordered by the Salt Valley, Kyago Tso and Puga Valley to the north; while the Tegazhung Plains (pasturelands) and Chumur region lie to its southeast. Several small mountain streams feed the lake, including one through pasture land at Peldo Le. The lake is fed by springs and snow melt and has a maximum depth of 40 m (130 ft). The primary western inflow comes from Lingdi River, the lake's major tributary, which drains the western catchment before entering Tso Moriri's southern shore. The lake's southern edge opens into a broad, flat valley that connects with - but hydrologically remains separate from - the Pare Chu river (part of Sutlej river basin). To the south of Tso Moriri lies the Nuro Sumdo (Narbu Sumdo) wetlands (with 20 km^{2} or 7.7 sq mi catchment), a boggy area outside the lake's drainage basin that primarily drains into the Pare Chu River system.

Tso Moriri is categorized among the Himalayan lakes based on origin. According to established classification systems, these lakes are divided into four groups, with Tso Moriri belonging to the third category of "remnant lakes" - water bodies that remain from much larger prehistoric lakes. The classification as reported states:

(i) Glacial lakes which are formed in and around glaciers; (ii) Structural lakes, formed by folds or faults due to movements in earth’s crust (e.g. Nainital lake in Uttarakhand), (iii) Remnant lakes which were originally structural but represent the remnants of vast lakes (e.g., Tso Moriri, Tso Kar, Pangong Tso in Ladakh, and Dal Lake in Kashmir), (iv) Natural dammed lakes i.e., temporary water bodies formed along the river courses due to deposition of rocks or debris e.g. Gohna Tal in Garhwal, Uttarakhand.

== Climate ==
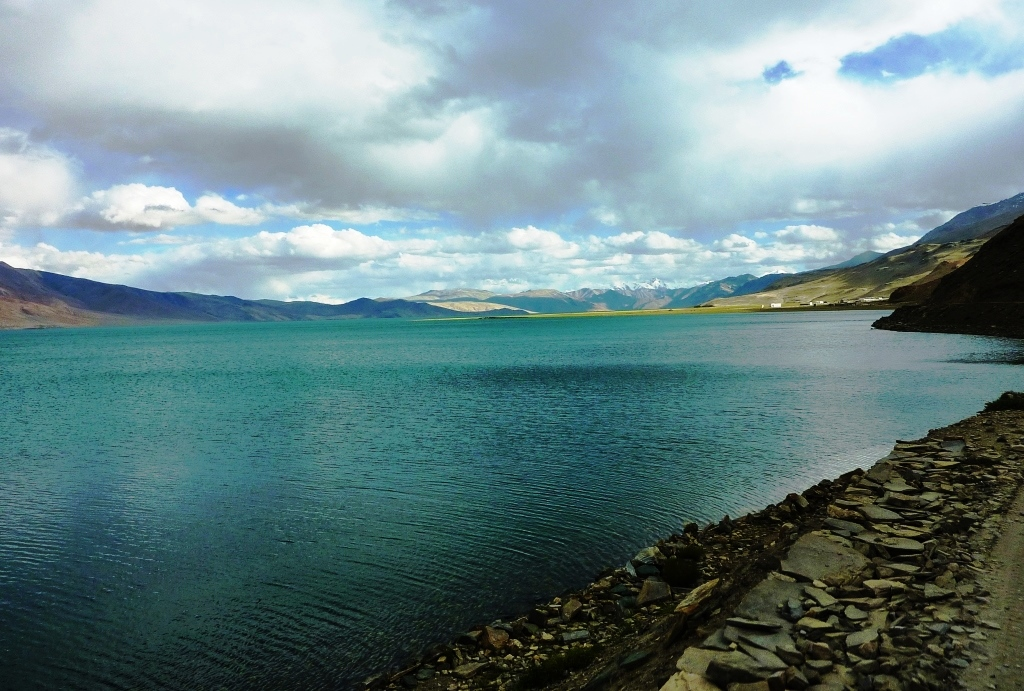
Tso Moriri, Ladakh, c. 2010.

Aridity and cold desert conditions prevail in the lake region; with summer temperature varying from 0 to 30 °C (32 to 86 °F) and winter temperature recording −10 and −40 °C (14 and −40 °F).

== People ==
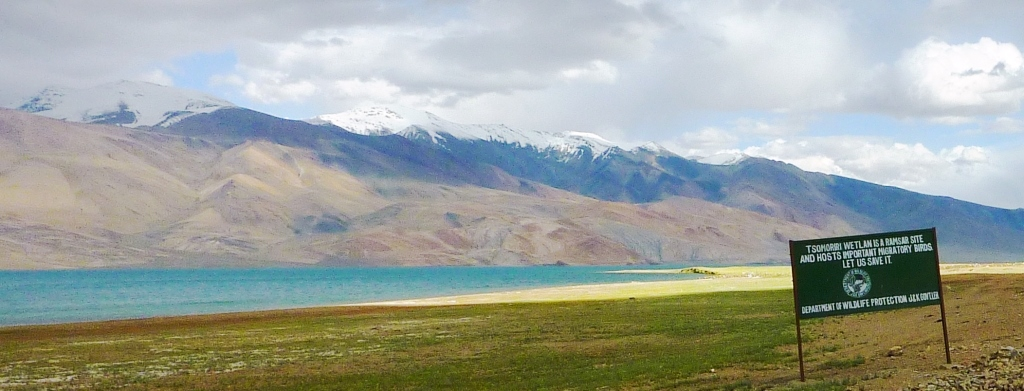
Lake Tsomoriri and sign.

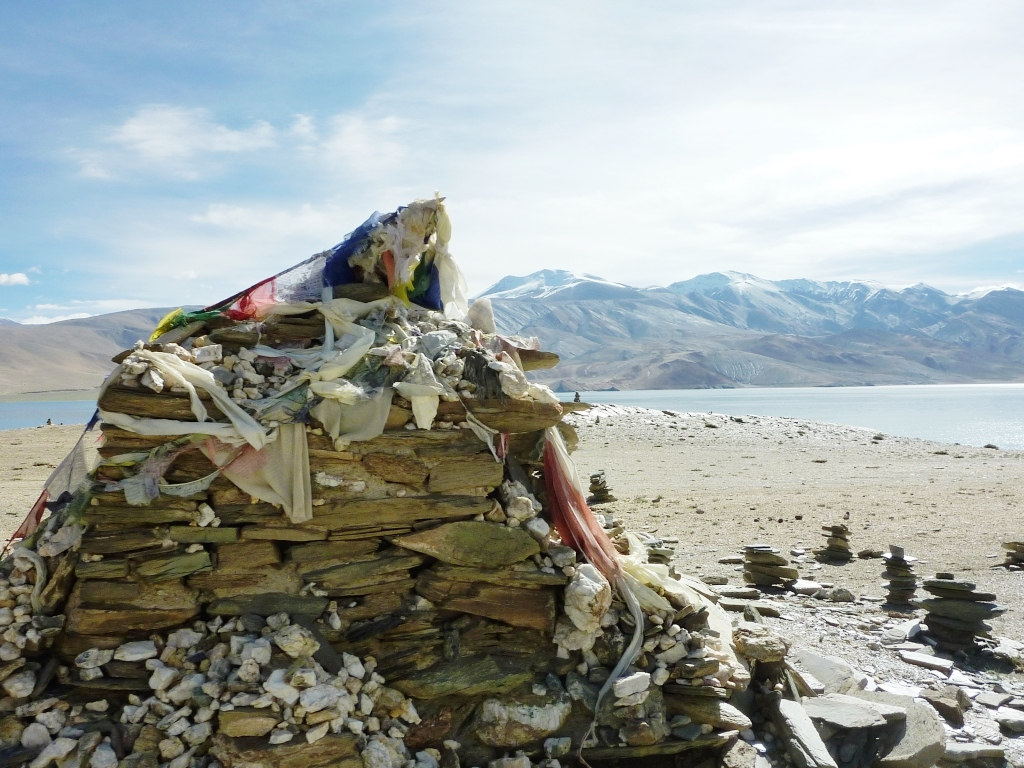
Buddhist shrine. On the banks of Tso Moriri, Ladkah, 2010.

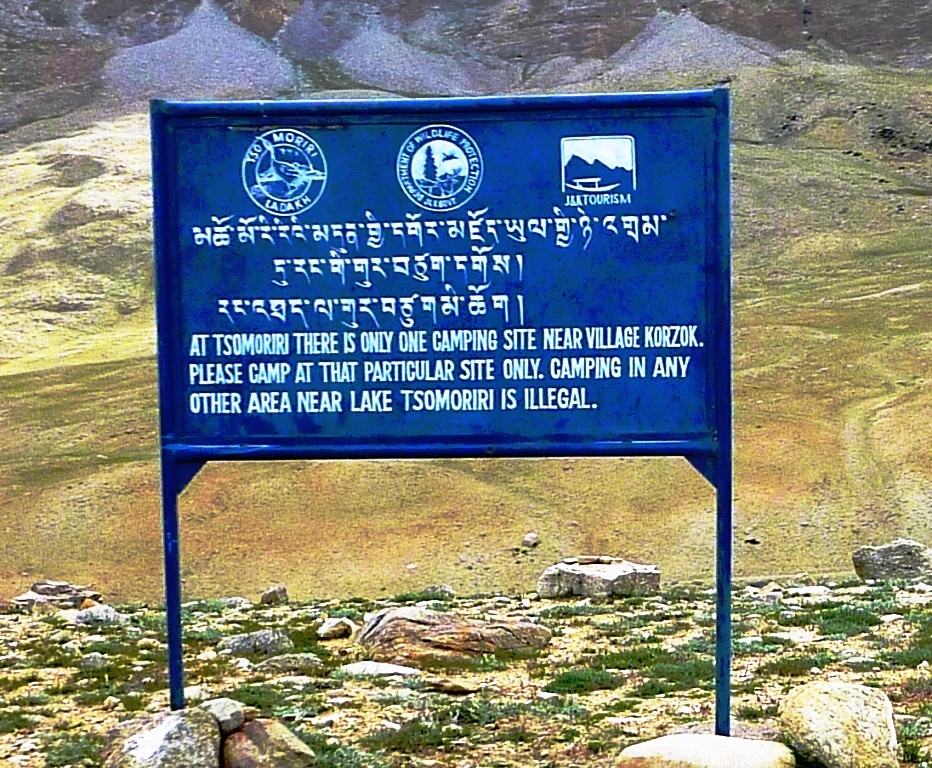
At Tsomoriri there is only one camping site. Sign at Tso Moriri, c. 2010.

Changpa, the nomadic migratory shepherds (pastoral community) of yak, sheep, goat, and horses of Tibetan origin and who are engaged in trade and work on caravans in Ladakh region, are the main inhabitants of the area. Changpa (Champa) herders use the land of this valley as grazing ground and for cultivation.

== Tourism ==
Karzok has homestays, Buddhist monastery and lake tourism.

The Korzok Monastery, on the western bank of the lake is 400 years old and attracts tourists and Buddhist pilgrims. Tourism during May – September attracts large number of foreign and local tourists even though tented accommodation is the facility available, apart from a small PWD guest house close to the Lake. Northeast of Tso Moriri is a small lake, Kyagar Tso in the Salt Valley, which is known locally as Lake of Joy.

== Transport ==
Airports:

- Kushok Bakula Rimpochee Airport, the nearest airport with scheduled domestic flights is at Leh, 240 kilometres (150 mi) northeast by road.
- Nyoma Military Airbase is only 60-70 km away to the northeast, but as of 2025 it is not open for the civilian flights though there are plans for the joint-use civilian enclave under the UDAN scheme.
- Rangrik Airport, the proposed airport 100-120 km to the south from Karzok.

Railway:

- Miroo, will be the nearest railway station at the under-construction Bhanupli–Leh line.

Roads:

- From north, via Sumdo from "Miroo-Puga-Sumdo-Mahe Road" (MPSM Road) and then travelling south on Sumdo-Karzok Road. See transport to Salt Valley and Tso Moriri.
- From south, via Kiato (near Kaza in Spiti Valley in Himachal Pradesh) from the 125 km long Kiato-Karzok Road through the Takling La Tunnel (5575 m) being constructed by the BRO as fourth alternative route to Ladakh.
- From northeast (Hanle) and east (Chumur), near Ryul Tso on Hanle-Ryul-Chumur Road taking the Ryul-Chumur Road towards south, and then taking the west turn near Tegazhung Plains (pastureland on southeast bank of Tso Moriri lake between the lake and Chumur) on the Chumur-Tegazhung-Karzok Road to go northwest to Karzok via Charchagan La (southeast bank of Tso Moriri).
- Tsomoriri-Pangong Tso 235km long tourist route via Nyoma, Chushul and Spangmik in the remote Changtang region, considered to be one of the most beautiful drives in the entire Ladakh region, is in a good condition for the most part. There are no petrol pumps on this long route, hence carrying enough fuel is necessary. Foreigners are not allowed to go beyond the Man - Merak villages on Pangong Tso as permits are not issued for them.

== Ecology ==
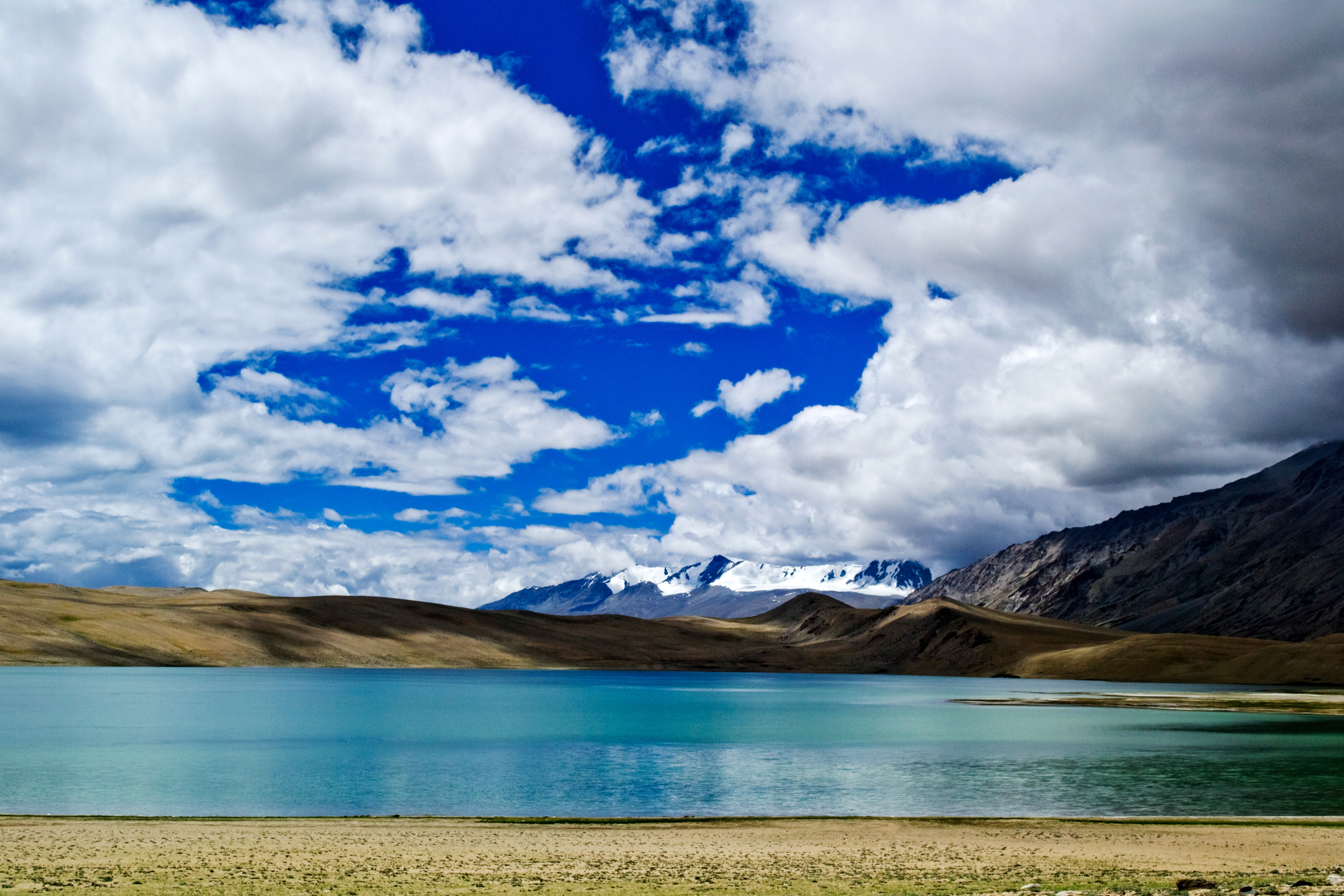
Tso Moriri Lake during August.

Tso Moriri basin represents a landscape of low productive ecosystems which protects unique floral and faunal species. The Working Report (2006) of the Planning Commission of the Government of India also reports:

Despite a poor vegetation cover, relatively low standing biomass and high anthropogenic pressure, this area sustains a considerably high livestock population. Steady increase in the livestock population in the area is mainly attributed to influx of nomadic herders from Tibet during recent decades and promotion of Pashmina goat production by the Animal Husbandry Department (AHD) for fine quality under wool (Pashmina). The herders and AHD officials, in recent years have begun to raise concern over degradation of pastures, resultant shortage of forage, and mass mortality of livestock during severe winters.

=== Flora ===
While deeper waters remain barren, Tso Moriri's shallows support Potamogeton spp., with marshes dominated by arid-steppe vegetation including characteristic Caragana, Astragalus, Potamogeton species. The area features characteristic several species of Carex, Primula (low growing herb), Pedicularis(parasitic plant), Juncus thomsonii and Leontopodium sp. Phytoplankton like Oocystis (900 cells/L to 25m depth) and diatom Cyclotella inhabit the waters, while surrounding pastures sustain domestic livestock.

=== Fauna ===
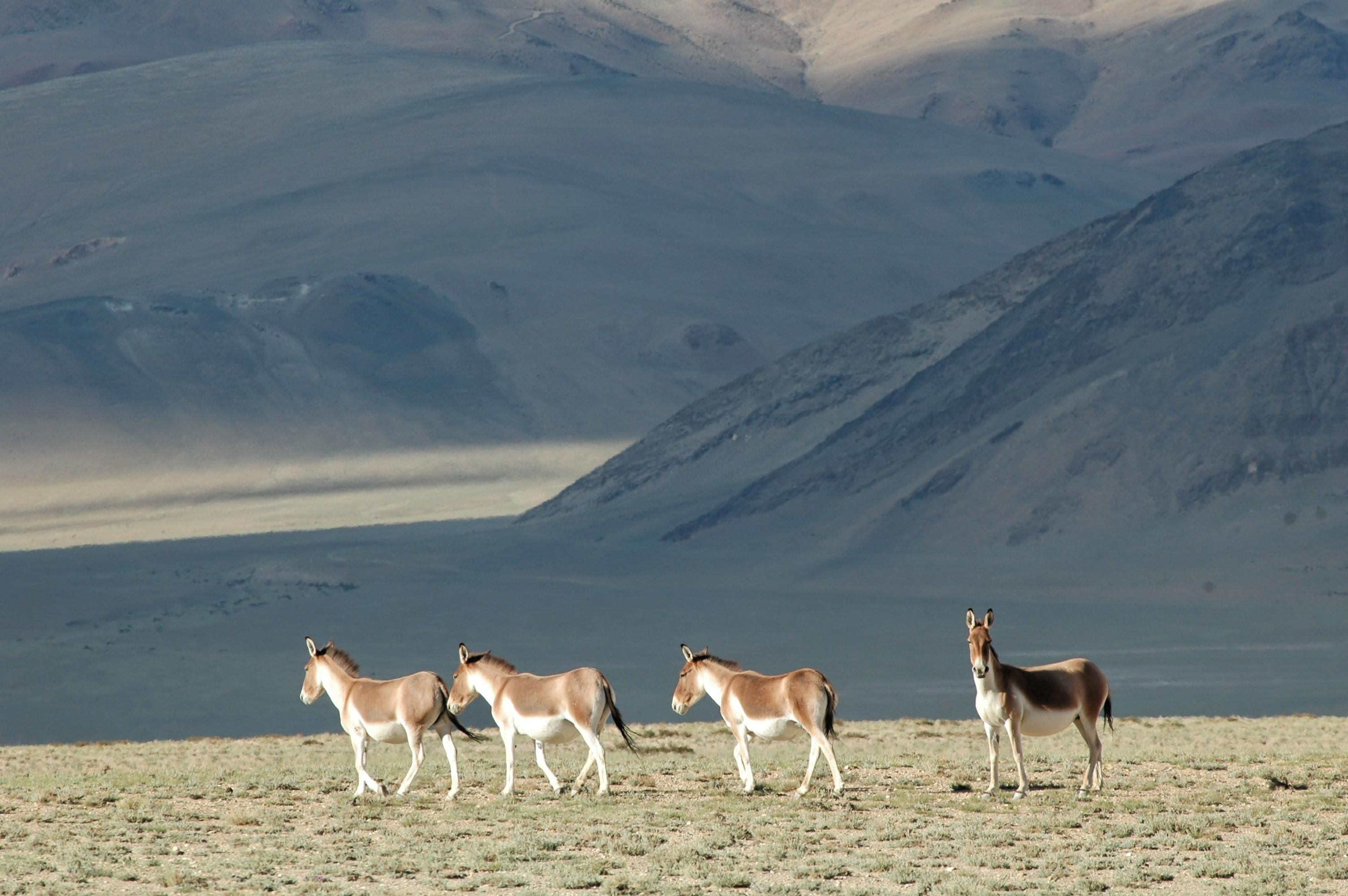
Kiangs in the vicinity of Tso Moriri Lake.

An avifaunal survey of the lake and its adjoining Nuro Sumdo wetland conducted in July 1996 revealed the following facts:

- Large carnivores: The snow leopard (Uncia uncia), Tibetan wolf (Canis lupus chanco).
- Mammals: The tibetan gazelle, procapra picticaudata, Goa antelope (threatened), Eurasian lynx, Nayan Ovis ammon hodgsoni, Bharal (Pseudois nayaur) Himalayan blue sheep, Tibetan Ass (Kiang) or Equus kiang, endemic to the Tibetan Plateau, Great Tibetan Sheep, species of marmot - Marmota himalayana (in large numbers seen on the hill slopes surrounding the lake and also along the roadsides), species of hare - Lepus oistolus, species of vole - Alticola roylei, 3 species of mouse hares (Ochotona macrotis, Ochotona curzoniae or Tibetan sand fox and Scincella ladacensis).
- Avifauna: The lake supports thirty-four bird species, including fourteen waterbird varieties, several of which are vulnerable or endangered. Notable among these are the endangeredblack-necked cranes (grus nigricollis), the bar-headed geese (anser indicus) - which finds its only Indian breeding ground here, brown-headed gulls (larus brunnicephalus), great crested grebe (podiceps cristatus), Ferruginous pochard, black-necked grebe (podiceps nigricollis).

== Conservation ==
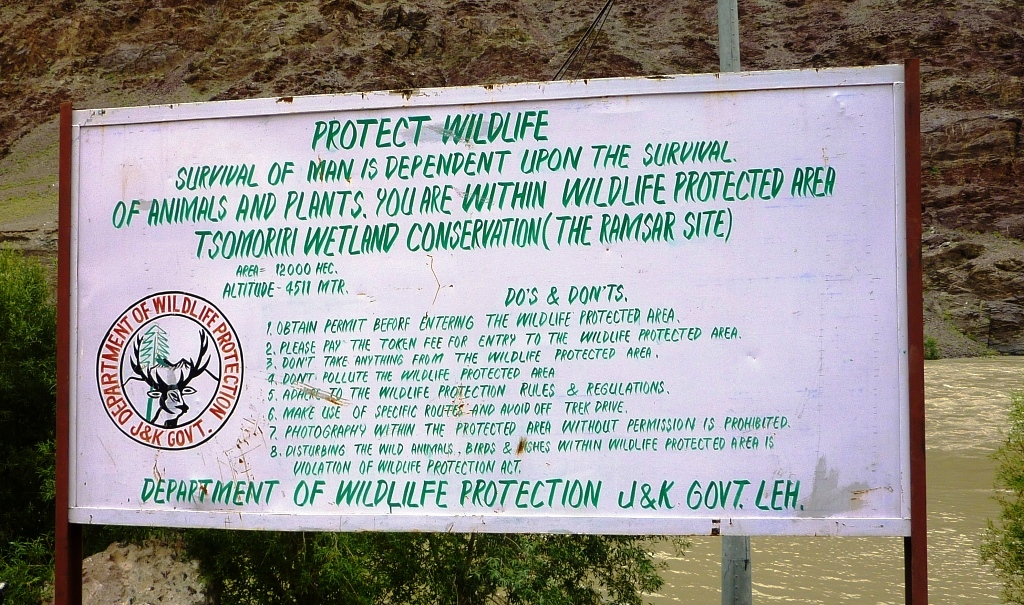
Conservation in Tsomomiri Wetland Conservation, Jammu and Kashmir, India.

Tso Moriri Wetland Conservation Reserve, a Ramsar site, is legally protected with hunting prohibitions enforced by a wildlife checkpoint at Mahe Bridge. Conservation efforts combine scientific research, community engagement, and institutional support:

- World Wildlife Fund-India leads conservation through its Korzok field office, conducting ecological surveys and awareness programs while developing sustainable tourism models and environmental management systems.
- Wildlife Institute of India maintains a Leh research station supporting scientific studies.
- Local communities have implemented habitat protection measures including traditional fencing and cleanup operations.
- Tso Moriri Conservation Trust and 20 school nature clubs promote environmental education.
- Indian Army has establish a Nature Interpretation Centre in Leh.
- Key achievements include the community's 2000 declaration of Tso Moriri as a 'Sacred Gift for a Living Planet' and restrictions on vehicular access through stakeholder consultation.

== Issues and threats ==
Threats to Tso Moriri's ecosystem include increasing tourist numbers disrupting avifauna breeding, road construction along the shoreline, and pasture degradation impacting marmots, hares and ungulates. Additional pressures come from expanding sheep grazing in wetlands, inadequate garbage disposal, and unleashed dogs preying on cranes and their eggs. Unregulated jeep safaris harass wildlife like kiang and encroach on breeding grounds, compounded by insufficient government monitoring and enforcement.

== See also ==
- Karzok, major habitation on the northwest shore of Tso Moriri
- Changthang Plateau lakes
  - More plains pool
    - Tso Kar
    - Startsapuk Tso
  - Salt Valley
    - Kyago Tso (Kyagar Tso)
    - Tso Moriri
  - Other lakes in Changthang Plateau
    - Chilling Tso
    - Ryul Tso
- Kailash Range lakes
  - Pangong Tso
  - Spanggur Tso
- Ladakh
  - Geography of Ladakh
  - Tourism in Ladakh
- General
  - Soda lake
  - Salt Valley
