= Karzok =

Karzok Korzok
- Village
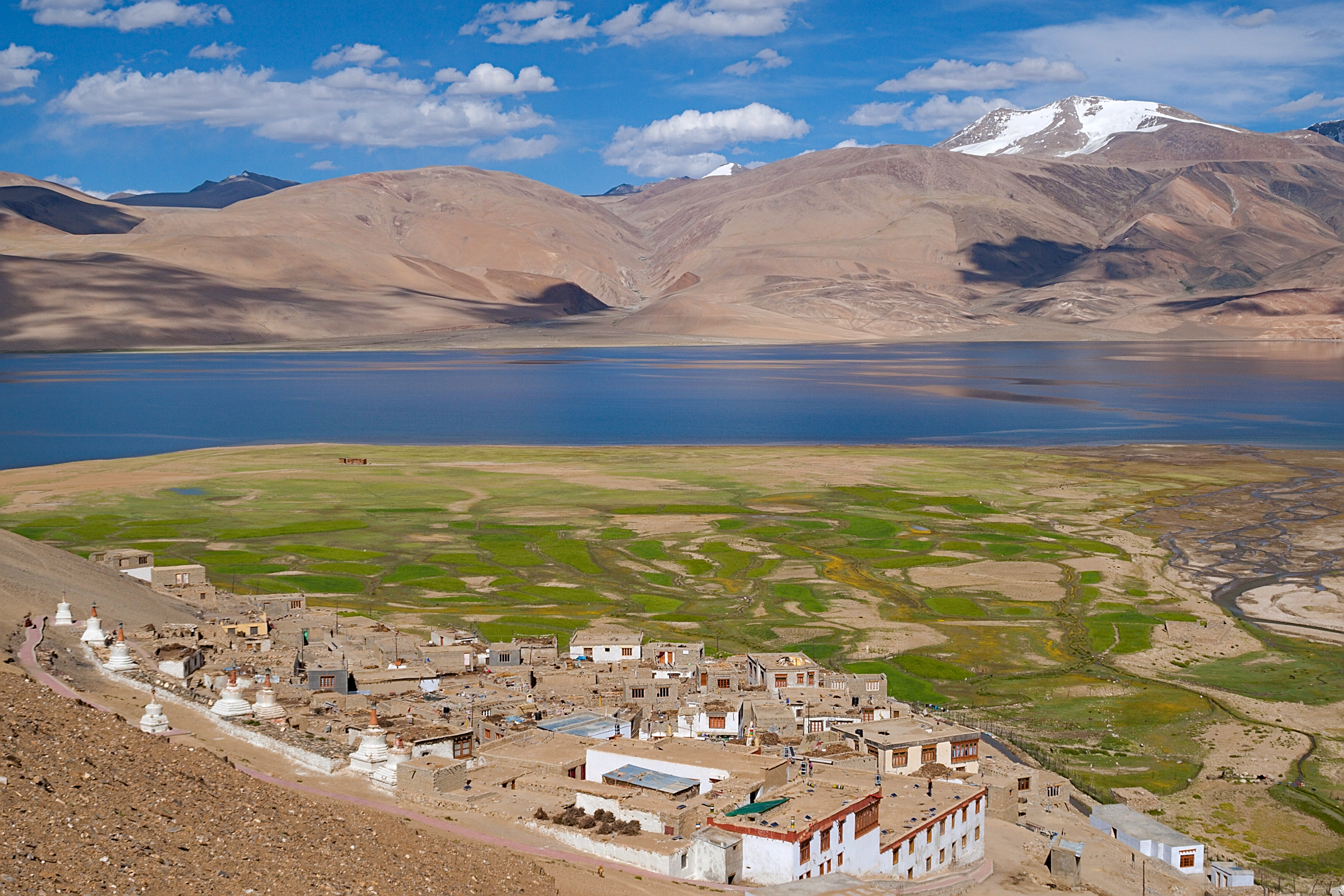
- Interactive map of Karzok
- Location in Ladakh, India Karzok (India)
- Coordinates: 32.968125°N 78.2639885°E
- Country: India
- Union Territory: Ladakh
- District: Changthang
- Tehsil: Nyoma
- Elevation: 4,595 m (15,075 ft)

Population (2011)
  - Total: 1,291
- Time zone: UTC+5:30 (IST)
- 2011 census code: 899

Karzok or Korzok (at an altitude of 14,995 ft or 4,570 m to 15,075 ft or 4,595 m above sea level), on the northwestern shores of the Tso Moriri lake, is a village in the Rupshu region and a block of the Changthang district in Ladakh, India.

Karzok is among the highest permanent settlements in the world. It is located 60 km southwest of Nyoma, 40 km south of Puga separated by Salt Valley, and 80-100 km northwest of Chumur. The Korzok Monastery, of Drukpa Tibetan Buddhist lineage, is located here.

== History ==
Karzok was on the Central Asian trade route until 1947 and was the headquarters of the Rupshu Valley. One of the kings, Rupshu Goba, who lived there with his family, built nine permanent houses there.

The village has several houses, and the nomadic population who establish their tents (made of yak hair or skin) in summer, add to the agricultural operations in the region. The tents are provided with vents at the top to let out the smoke. Pashmina is the valuable product that the Changmas trade along with the salt that they extract from large salt fields in the area, such as the springs at Puga. They barter these two products for food grains and other necessities. In recent years, building activity is on the rise with the nomadic tribes changing their lifestyle.

== Geography ==
Karzok in Changthang plateau lies on the northwest bank of the salt lake, Tso Moriri, north of which lies the Salt Valley. The Salt Valley has the Kyago Tso salt lake surrounded by several glaciated mountain peaks including the Karzok Kangri (6,110m/20,046ft, also called Korzok Kangri) which lies immediate south of Spangnak Ri and northwest of Karzok.

== Demographics ==
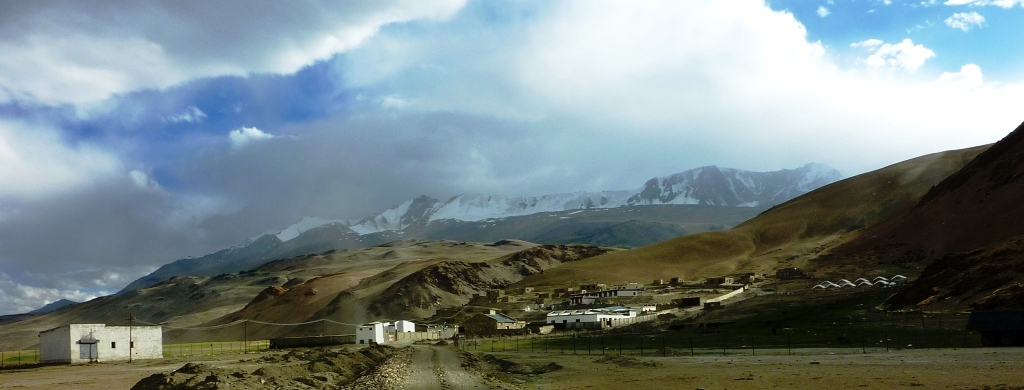
Karzok village

According to the 2011 census of India, Karzok has 253 households. The effective literacy rate (i.e. the literacy rate of population excluding children aged 6 and below) is 46.64%.

Demographics (2011 Census)
	Total	Male	Female
Population	1291	673	618
Children aged below 6 years	189	102	87
Scheduled caste	4	2	2
Scheduled tribe	931	485	446
Literates	514	292	222
Workers (all)	813	450	363
Main workers (total)	315	225	90
Main workers: Cultivators	257	192	65
Main workers: Agricultural labourers	3	2	1
Main workers: Household industry workers	6	0	6
Main workers: Other	49	31	18
Marginal workers (total)	498	225	273
Marginal workers: Cultivators	224	117	107
Marginal workers: Agricultural labourers	7	3	4
Marginal workers: Household industry workers	126	19	107
Marginal workers: Others	141	86	55
Non-workers	478	223	255

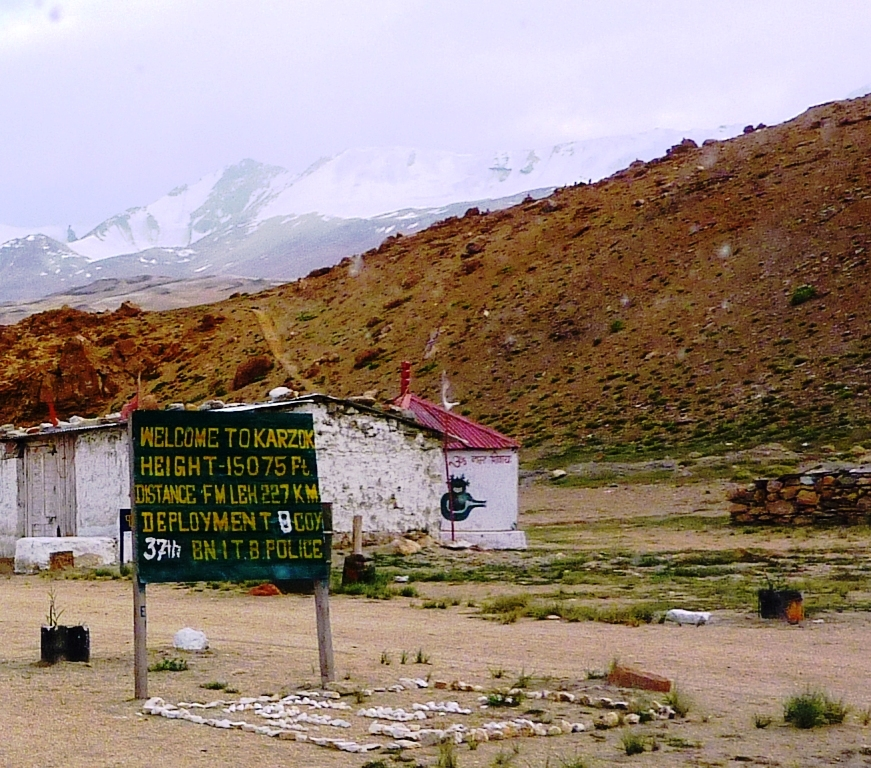
Welcome sign, Karzok

== Climate ==
Karzok has a subarctic climate (Köppen classification Dfc) bordering on a tundra climate (ET). Summers are cool with chilly nights, and winters are long and cold with highs below zero.

Climate data for Karzok
Month	Jan	Feb	Mar	Apr	May	Jun	Jul	Aug	Sep	Oct	Nov	Dec	Year
Mean daily maximum °C (°F)	−7.2 (19.0)	−5.4 (22.3)	−1.2 (29.8)	4.3 (39.7)	9.2 (48.6)	14.0 (57.2)	16.9 (62.4)	16.2 (61.2)	12.9 (55.2)	6.5 (43.7)	1.2 (34.2)	−3.5 (25.7)	5.3 (41.6)
Daily mean °C (°F)	−13.1 (8.4)	−11.2 (11.8)	−6.8 (19.8)	−1.5 (29.3)	2.9 (37.2)	7.4 (45.3)	10.7 (51.3)	10.2 (50.4)	6.4 (43.5)	−0.2 (31.6)	−5.6 (21.9)	−10.0 (14.0)	−0.9 (30.4)
Mean daily minimum °C (°F)	−18.9 (−2.0)	−16.9 (1.6)	−12.4 (9.7)	−7.2 (19.0)	−3.3 (26.1)	0.9 (33.6)	4.5 (40.1)	4.2 (39.6)	0.0 (32.0)	−6.8 (19.8)	−12.4 (9.7)	−16.5 (2.3)	−7.1 (19.3)
Average precipitation mm (inches)	22 (0.9)	21 (0.8)	24 (0.9)	19 (0.7)	19 (0.7)	9 (0.4)	28 (1.1)	34 (1.3)	23 (0.9)	12 (0.5)	7 (0.3)	12 (0.5)	230 (9)
Source: climate-data.com

== Transport ==
From the north, Karzok is reachable via Sumdo, on the Miroo-Puga-Sumdo-Mahe Road (MPSM Road) which begins at NH-3 (Miroo) and ends at Leh-Nyoma Road (Mahe). From Sumdo, the Karzok is at the southern end of 40 km long Sumdo-Karzok Road.

From the south, the Karzok is reachable via Sumdo Kaza (in Himachal Pradesh) by the 125 km long Kiato-Karzok Road via the Takling La being constructed by the BRO as the fourth road to Ladakh.

== See also ==
- Geography of Ladakh
- Tourism in Ladakh
