= Rupshu =

Valley in Ladakh, India

Rupshu is a high elevation plateau valley and an eponymous community development block in southeast Ladakh, India. It is between the Startsapuk Tso and Tso Moriri, and west of Mahe.

The Salt Valley and the Puga Valley to its north are also part of the bigger Rupshu area. The Chumar area disputed by India-China in south-eastern Ladakh lies in Rupshu block, south of the Tso Moriri lake, on the bank of the Parang River (or Pare Chu), close to Ladakh's border with Tibet.

== Geography ==
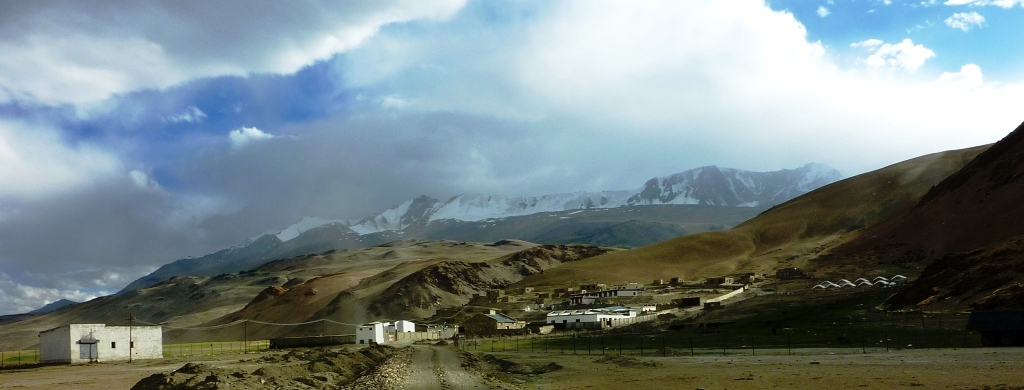
Karzok village on the bank of Tso Moriri.

Frederic Drew describes the Rupshu valley as follows:

From the side of Leh it is approached by leaving the Indus at Upshi (33.8302°N 77.8145°E) and following up the narrow ravine which there joins in from the south.... After 13 or 14 miles we come to Gya (33.6498°N 77.7398°E), the last village in this direction, a place elevated 13,500 feet above the sea... we have to cross the Toglung Pass (33.5886°N 77.7493°E), of 17,500 feet elevation, which we approach by continuing up the same valley for some 14 miles more... From the summit we obtain a view which gives us some insight into Rupshu. There is a pretty steep slope beneath us of near 1500 feet, and then a flat valley extending long to the south-east and widening, thus showing us far off, 18 miles distant, the blue waters of one of the lakes which we shall visit—the [Tso Kar] Salt Lake (33.31°N 78.00°E). The flat bottom of the valley is bounded by smooth naked hills. It is such valleys as this, varying from a mile to (rarely) six miles in width, and enclosed by mountains rising sometimes 2000 feet and sometimes as much as 5000 feet above them, that make what are called the uplands, or sometimes the table-lands, of Rupshu.

Drew states that the valleys of Rupshu continue beyond the Tso Kar lake until the Tso Moriri lake (32.9117°N 78.3101°E), and also extend to the east to cover the valley of Hanle (32.7715°N 78.9832°E).

At its narrowest definition, the Rupshu valley ranges from 20 km northwest of Tso Moriri to 50 km northwest. The elevation of that valley is between 4,500 metres (14,800 ft) and 5,500 metres (18,000 ft). It is inhabited by the Changpa nomads and contains the Tso Kar salt lake.

More widely, the term "Rupshu" is used for a wider area, ranging from the Manali-Leh Highway region to the west to east of Tso Moriri, incorporating some of the Ladakhi portion of the Changthang Plateau area in which Tso Moriri is found.

North of Rupshu area is the Indus River Valley. The subsection of the Indus River Valley from Mahe to Upshi is called the Rong Valley (not to be confused with the Wakha Rong River Valley in Kargil district). The Rong Valley section is a deep gorge, and the word 'rong' means 'the gorge' in Ladakhi language. The group of four villages within the Rong Valley with the tourist homestays has the highest concentration of the snow leopard, Liktsey (70 km SE of Leh) famous for carpet weaving, Tukla (72 km SE of Leh) famous for monastery and Asiatic ibexibex, Hemya (80 km SE of Leh and 10 km from Liktsey) famous for basket-making, and Kesar (135 km SE of Leh).

== Transport ==
Rupshu is reachable by road from Mahe and Karzok.

Hanle-Kaza-Tabo Road (HKT Road), being constructed by the BRO under Indo-China Border Roads (ICBR) scheme, will provide additional access to mainland India.

== See also ==
- Geography of Ladakh
  - Karzok
- Tourism in Ladakh

== Bibliography ==
- Drew, Frederic (1875), The Jummoo and Kashmir Territories: A Geographical Account, E. Stanford – via archive.org
