= Spangnak Ri =

Mountain peak

- Location within India Location within Ladakh

Highest point
- Elevation: 6,390 m (20,960 ft)
- Prominence: 1,379 m (4,524 ft)
- Coordinates: 33°07′33″N 78°10′29″E

Geography
- Location: Ladakh

Climbing
- First ascent: No records

Spangnak Ri is a mountain peak located at 6,390 m (20,960 ft) above sea level in the far west of the Transhimalaya.

== Location ==
The peak is located in the South-west of Samad Rakchan village in Nyoma tehsil of Ladakh. The prominence is 1,379 m (4,524 ft).

== Transport ==
See transport to Spangnak Ri, Salt Valley, Tso Moriri and Karzok.

== See also ==
- Geography of Ladakh
- Tourism in Ladakh
