= Frederick Drew =

- Born: 11 August 1836; Southampton, Hampshire
- Died: 28 October 1891 (aged 55)
- Occupation: Geologist
- Known for: geographical study of Kashmir

Frederick Drew FGS, FRGS (11 August 1836 – 28 October 1891), was an English geologist, who is noted for his geographical study of Kashmir. He worked as a geologist for over a decade in Maharaja Ranbir Singh's government and also served as the governor of Ladakh. He was elected Fellow of the Geological Society of London.

== Early life ==
Frederick Drew was born at Southampton. He was the youngest son of astronomer John Drew and Clara Drew. Drew was educated at Southampton private school run by his father. Later he studied the Royal School of Mines in 1853, passed with distinction. He joined the British Geological Survey in 1855.

== Career ==
Drew was employed for seven years in the south-east of England, and did much for the geology of the weald, especially in tracing out and describing the subdivisions of the Hastings sands. He contributed papers to the 'Journal' of the Geological Society in 1861 and 1864, and he wrote a memoir describing the Romney marsh district. His notes were used by William Topley in his 'Geology of the Weald' (Memoirs of the Geological Survey, 1875).

In 1862 he entered the service of the Maharajah of Kashmir, with whom he remained ten years. He was at first engaged in looking for minerals, was then charged with the management of the forest department, and was finally governor of the province of Ladakh (1870–1871). He served as the Maharaja's representative on a "second" boundary commission to delineate the boundary between Ladakh and the British Indian districts Lahaul and Spiti.

He acquired an intimate knowledge of the country and the people, and after his return to England he wrote The Jummoo and Kashmir Territories: a Geographical Account (London, 1875). It was provided with excellent maps, showing not only the physical features, but the distribution of races, languages, and faiths. A translation by Baron Ernouf was published at Paris in 1877; and in the same year Drew published a more popular account under the title The Northern Barrier of India.

He had been elected a fellow of the Geological Society of London in 1858, and served on the council from 1874 to 1876. In 1875, he was appointed one of the science masters at Eton, and he remained there till his death on 28 October 1891.

== Reception ==
Sir Archibald Geikie has made mention of 'his gentleness, helpfulness, and entire unselfishness, and his quiet enthusiasm for that domain of natural science to which he had given the labours of his life.' Scholar Parshotam Mehra regarded Jammoo and Kashmir Territories 'the definitive work on Kashmir's frontiers'.

== Personal life ==
He married Sara Constance, daughter of Alfred Waylen, one of the first settlers in Western Australia, and he left two sons and two daughters.
