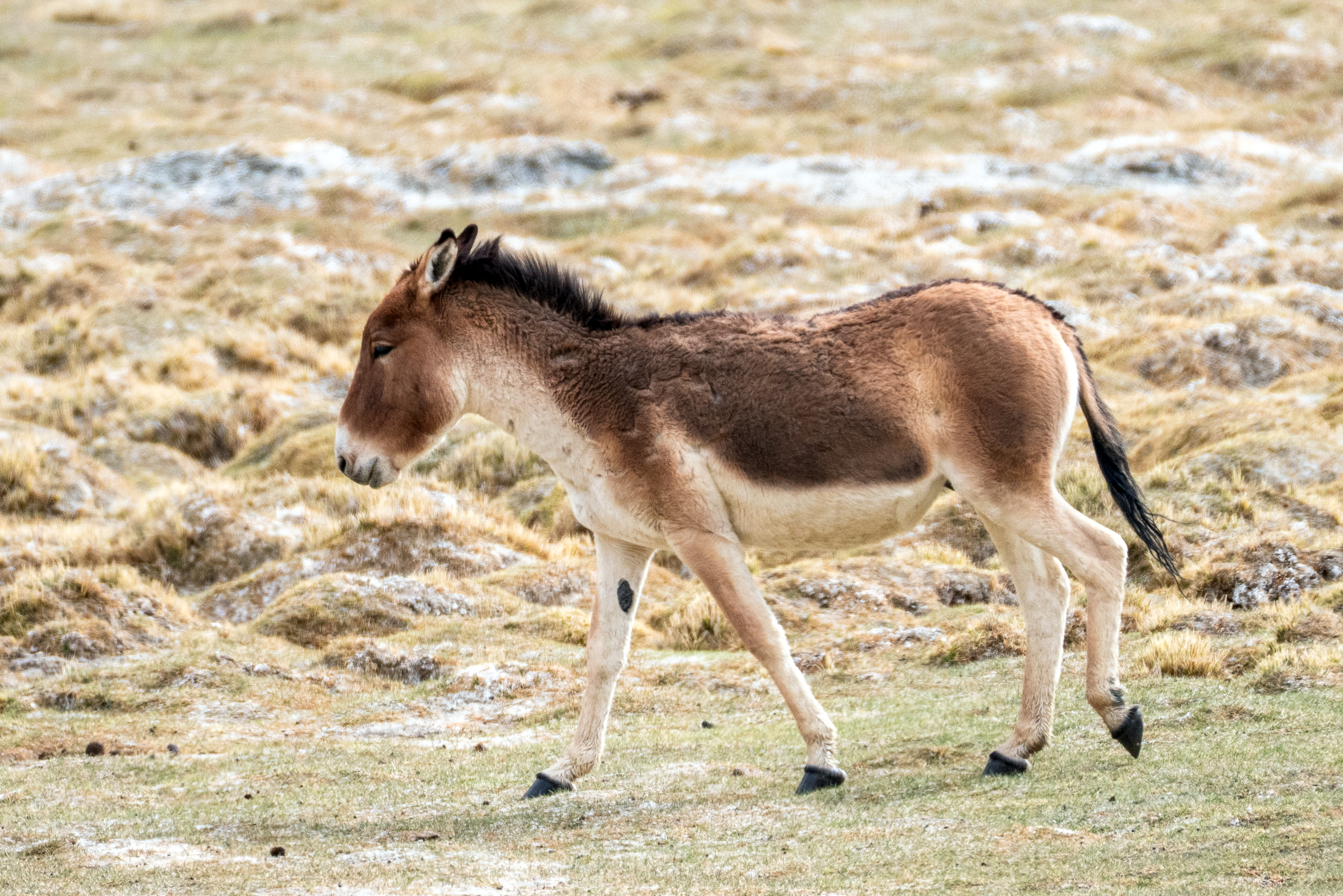
- At Leh, India

Conservation status
- Least Concern (IUCN 3.1)
- CITES Appendix II

Scientific classification
- Kingdom: Animalia
- Phylum: Chordata
- Class: Mammalia
- Order: Perissodactyla
- Family: Equidae
- Genus: Equus
- Subgenus: Asinus
- Species: E. kiang

Binomial name
- Equus kiang Moorcroft, 1841
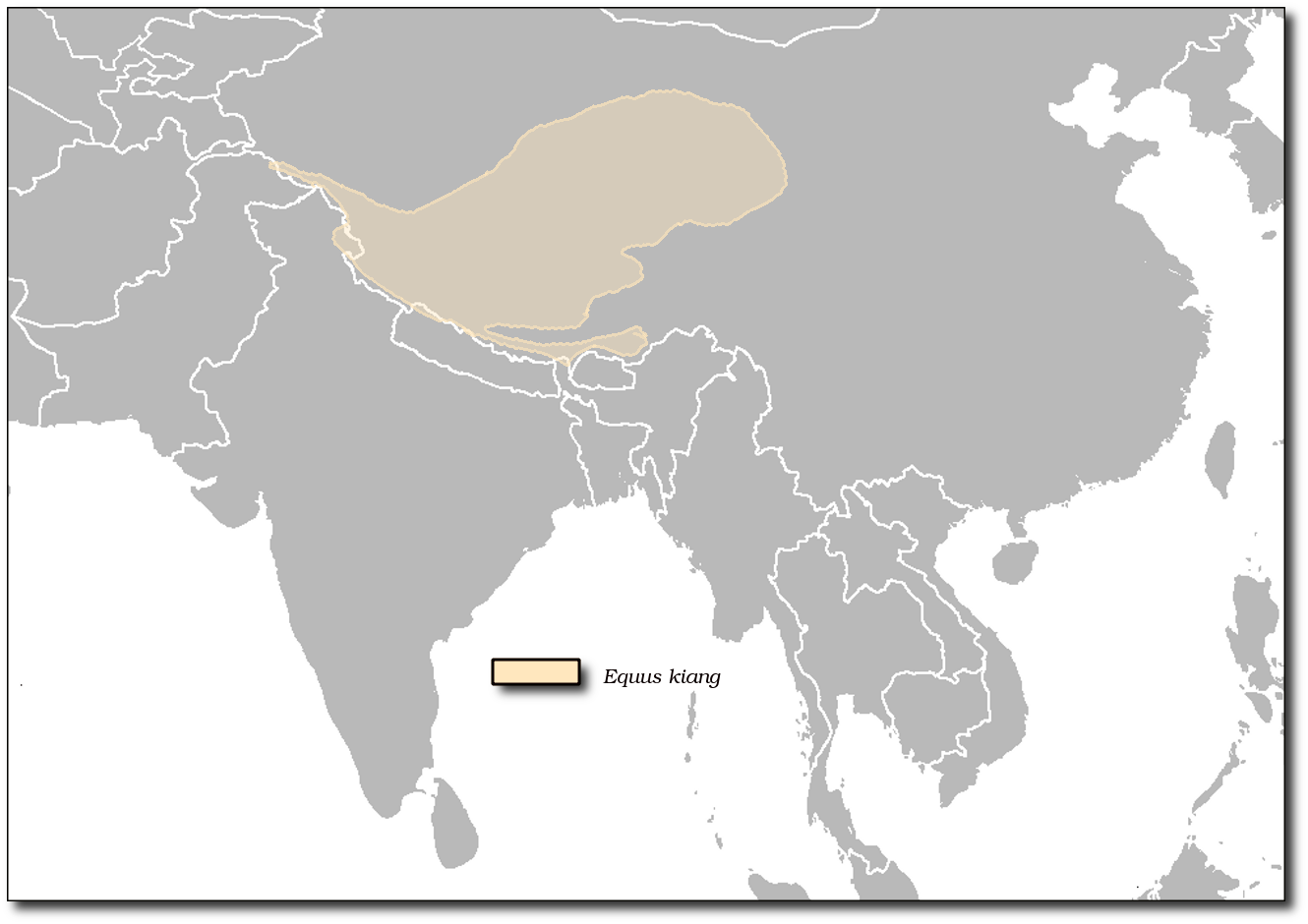
- Range map

= Kiang =

Tibetan wild ass

The kiang (Equus kiang) is the largest species of the Asinus subgenus. It is native to the Tibetan Plateau in India, northern Pakistan, China and northern Nepal. It inhabits montane grasslands and shrublands. Other common names for this species include Tibetan wild ass, khyang and gorkhar.

== Description ==
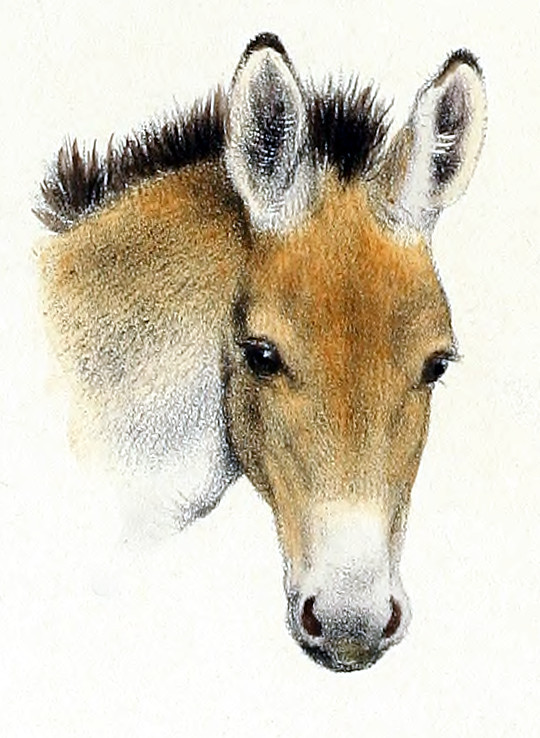
Kiang of Tibet from The Great and Small Game of India, Burma, and Tibet (1900)

The kiang is the largest of the wild asses, with an average height at the withers of 140 cm (55 in). They range from 132 to 142 cm (52 to 56 in) high at the withers, with a body 182 to 214 cm (72 to 84 in) long, and a tail of 32 to 45 cm (13 to 18 in). Kiangs have only slight sexual dimorphism, with the males weighing from 350 to 400 kg (770 to 880 lb), while females weigh 250 to 300 kg (550 to 660 lb). They have a large head, with a blunt muzzle and a convex nose. The mane is upright and relatively short. The coat is a rich chestnut colour, darker brown in winter and a sleek reddish brown in late summer, when the animal moults its woolly fur. The summer coat is 1.5 cm (0.59 in) long, and the winter coat is double that length. The legs, underparts, end of the muzzle, and the inside of the ears are all white. A broad, dark chocolate-coloured dorsal stripe extends from the mane to the end of the tail, which ends in a tuft of blackish brown hairs.

== Genomics ==
Results of a chromosome-level genome study indicate that expanded gene families and positively selected genes in the kiang were mainly associated with hypoxia response, as well as metabolism and immunity, consistent with adaptation to high-elevation environments.

A telomere-to-telomere chromosome-level genome assembly of the kiang published in 2026 is approximately 2.48 Gb, with 96.85% of the sequence anchored to 27 pseudochromosomes. This assembly has a BUSCO completeness of 96.3% and contains 20,654 predicted protein-coding genes.

== Evolution ==
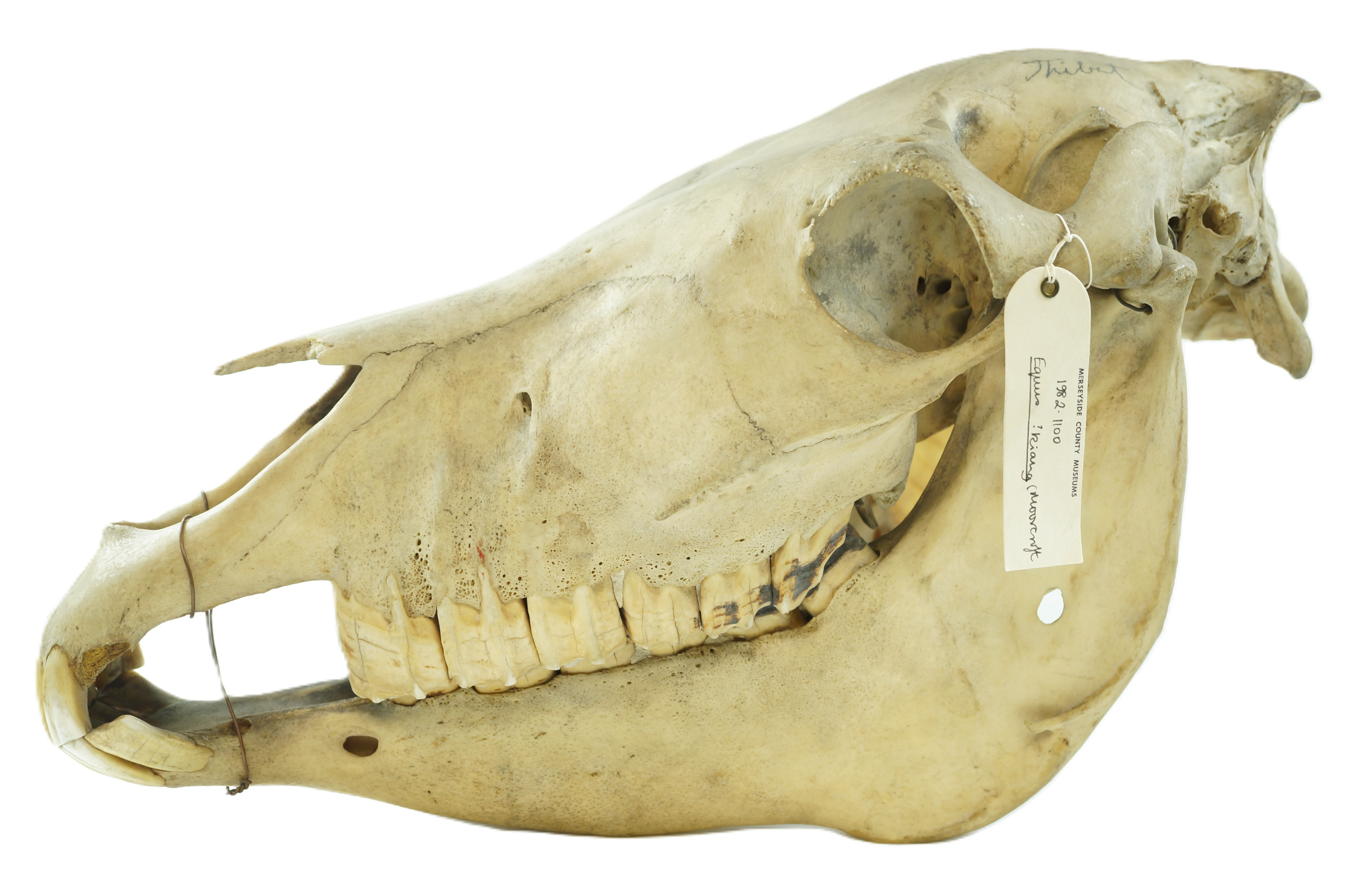
Skull of Equus kiang held at World Museum, National Museums Liverpool (NML-VZ 1982.1100)

The genus Equus, which includes all extant equines, is believed to have evolved from Dinohippus, via the intermediate form Plesippus. One of the oldest species is Equus simplicidens, described as zebra-like with a donkey-shaped head. The oldest fossil to date is about 3.5 million years old from Idaho, US. The genus appears to have spread quickly into the Old World, with the similarly aged Equus livenzovensis documented from western Europe and Russia.

Molecular phylogenies indicate the most recent common ancestor of all modern equids lived about 3.9 to 7.8 million years ago. Direct paleogenomic sequencing of a 700,000-year-old middle Pleistocene horse metapodial bone from Canada implies a more recent 4.07 million years ago for the most recent common ancestor within the range of 4 to 4.5 million years ago.

== Taxonomy ==
The kiang is closely related to the onager (Equus hemionus), and in some classifications it is considered a subspecies, E. hemionus kiang. Molecular studies indicate that the kiang is nested deeply within the extant radiation of E. hemionus. Based on a 1967 morphological study the two are considered separate species by the IUCN as of 2026.

Kiangs can crossbreed with onagers, horses, donkeys, and Burchell's zebras in captivity, although, like mules, the resulting offspring are sterile. Kiangs have never been domesticated.

Three kiang subspecies are currently recognised:

- E. k. kiang — western kiang in Tibet, Ladakh, Gilgit Baltistan and southwestern Xinjiang
- E. k. holdereri — eastern kiang in Qinghai and southeastern Xinjiang
- E. k. polyodon — southern kiang in southern Tibet up to northern Nepal

The eastern kiang is the largest subspecies; the southern kiang is the smallest. The western kiang is slightly smaller than the eastern and also has a darker coat. However, no genetic information confirms the validity of the three subspecies, which may simply represent a cline, with gradual variation between the three forms.

Reports of fossil kiangs from the Pleistocene of the Yukon have been reidentified as Haringtonhippus francisci. Morphological evidence suggested that this species was a close relative of the asian wild asses, but molecular evidence shows that the two groups are widely separated.

== Distribution and habitat ==
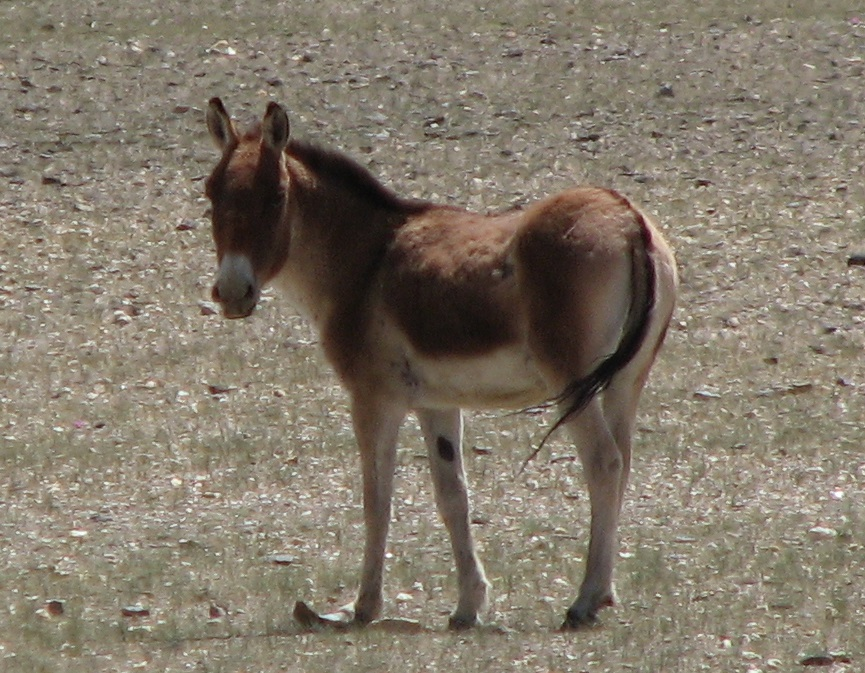
Wild kiang in Changtang

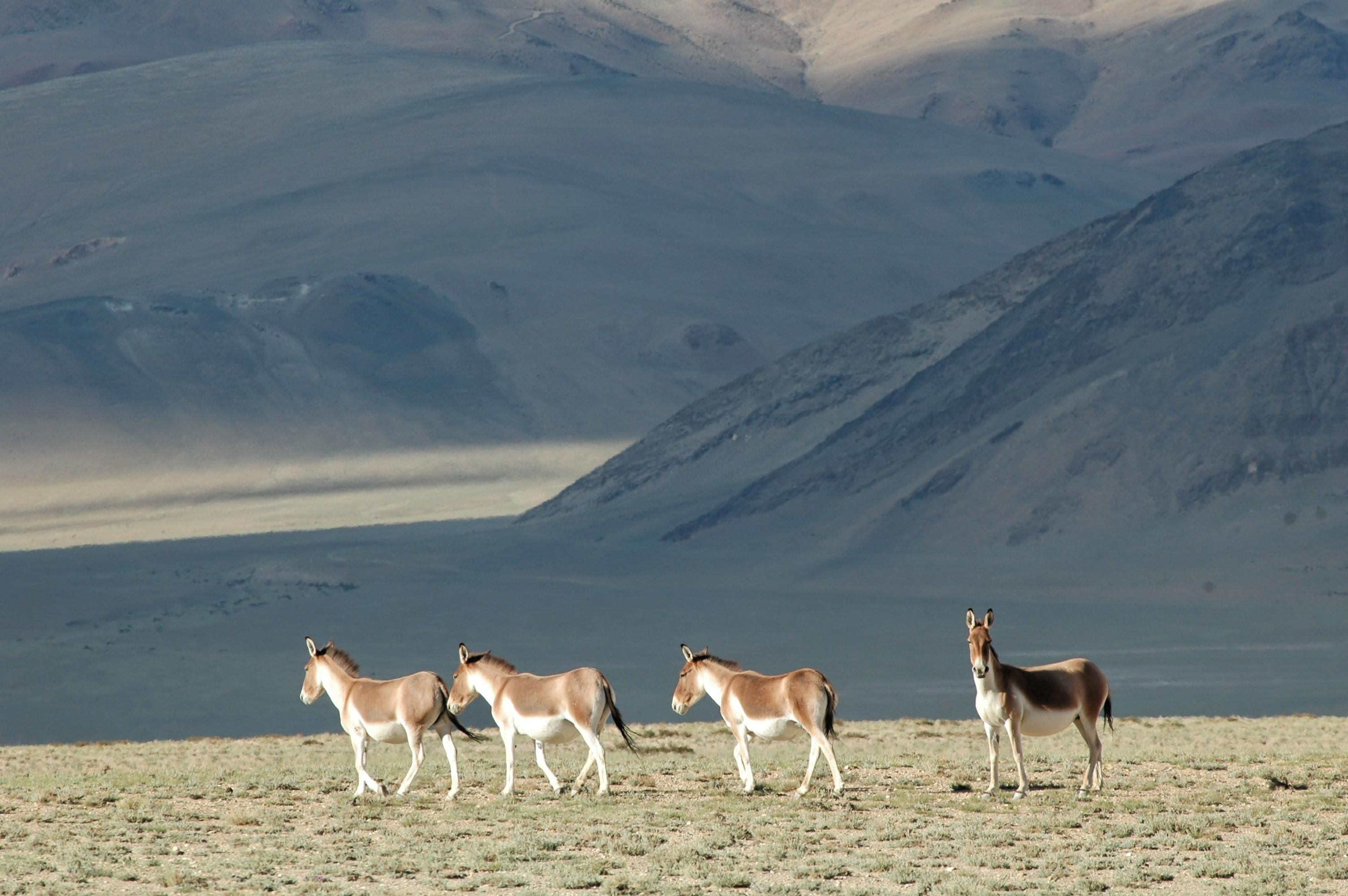
A small group of Kiangs in the vicinity of Tso Moriri Lake

The kiang is distributed in the Himalayas and Tibetan Plateau from northern Pakistan, Ladakh, Himachal Pradesh and Uttarakhand states of India to Qinghai, Gansu, southern Xinjiang and Sichuan regions of China. It inhabits alpine meadows and steppe country at elevations from 2,700 to 5,300 m (8,900 to 17,400 ft), preferring relatively flat plateaus, wide valleys, and low hills, dominated by grasses, sedges, and other short vegetation.

In Pakistan, the kiang occurs in the area between the Oprang river and the Shaksgam River with its presence confirmed in Khunjerab National Park. There are also small numbers along the northern frontier of Nepal.

== Behavior and ecology ==
The kiang is a herbivore, feeding on grasses and sedges, especially Stipa, but also on other plants such as bog sedges, true sedges, and meadow grasses. When little grass is available, such as during winter or in the more arid margins of their native habitat, kiangs have been observed eating shrubs, herbs, and even Oxytropis roots dug from the ground. Although they do sometimes drink from waterholes, such sources of water are rare on the Tibetan Plateau, and they likely obtain most of their water from the plants they eat, or possibly from snow in winter.

Kiangs sometimes gather in large herds, which may number several hundred individuals. However, these herds are not permanent groupings, but temporary aggregations, consisting either of young males only, or of mothers and their foals. Older males are typically solitary, defending a territory of about 0.5 to 5 km^{2} (0.19 to 1.93 sq mi) from rivals, and dominating any local groups of females. Territorial males sometimes become aggressive towards intruders, kicking and biting at them, but more commonly chase them away after a threat display that involves flattening the ears and braying.

=== Reproduction ===
Kiangs mate between late July and late August, when older males tend reproductive females by trotting around them, and then chasing them prior to mating. The length of gestation has been variously reported as seven to 12 months, and results in the birth of a single foal. Females are able to breed again almost immediately after birth, although births every other year are more common. Foals weigh up to 35 kg (77 lb) at birth, and are able to walk within a few hours. The age of sexual maturity is unknown, although probably around three or four years, as it is in the closely related onager. Kiang live for up to 20 years in the wild.

== In culture ==
Natural historian Chris Lavers points to travellers' tales of the kiang as one source of inspiration for the unicorn, first described in Indika by the Ancient Greek physician Ctesias.

Ekai Kawaguchi, a Japanese monk who traveled in Tibet from July, 1900 to June 1902, reported:

As I have already said, khyang is the name given by the Tibetans to the wild horse of their northern steppes. More accurately it is a species of ass, quite as large in size as a large Japanese horse. In color it is reddish brown, with black hair on the ridge of the back and black mane and with the belly white. To all appearance it is an ordinary horse, except for its tufted tail. It is a powerful animal, and it is extraordinarily fleet. It is never seen singly, but always in twos or threes, if not in a herd of sixty or seventy. Its scientific name is Equus hemionis, but is for the most part called by its Tibetan name, which is usually spelled khyang in English. It has a curious habit of turning round and round, when it comes within seeing distance of a man. Even a mile and a quarter away, it will commence this turning round at every short stage of its approach, and after each turn it will stop for a while, to look at the man over its own back, like a fox. Ultimately it comes up quite close. When quite near it will look scared, and at the slightest thing will wheel round and dash away, but only to stop and look back. When one thinks it has run far away, it will be found that it has circled back quite near, to take, as it were, a silent survey of the stranger from behind. Altogether it is an animal of very queer habits.

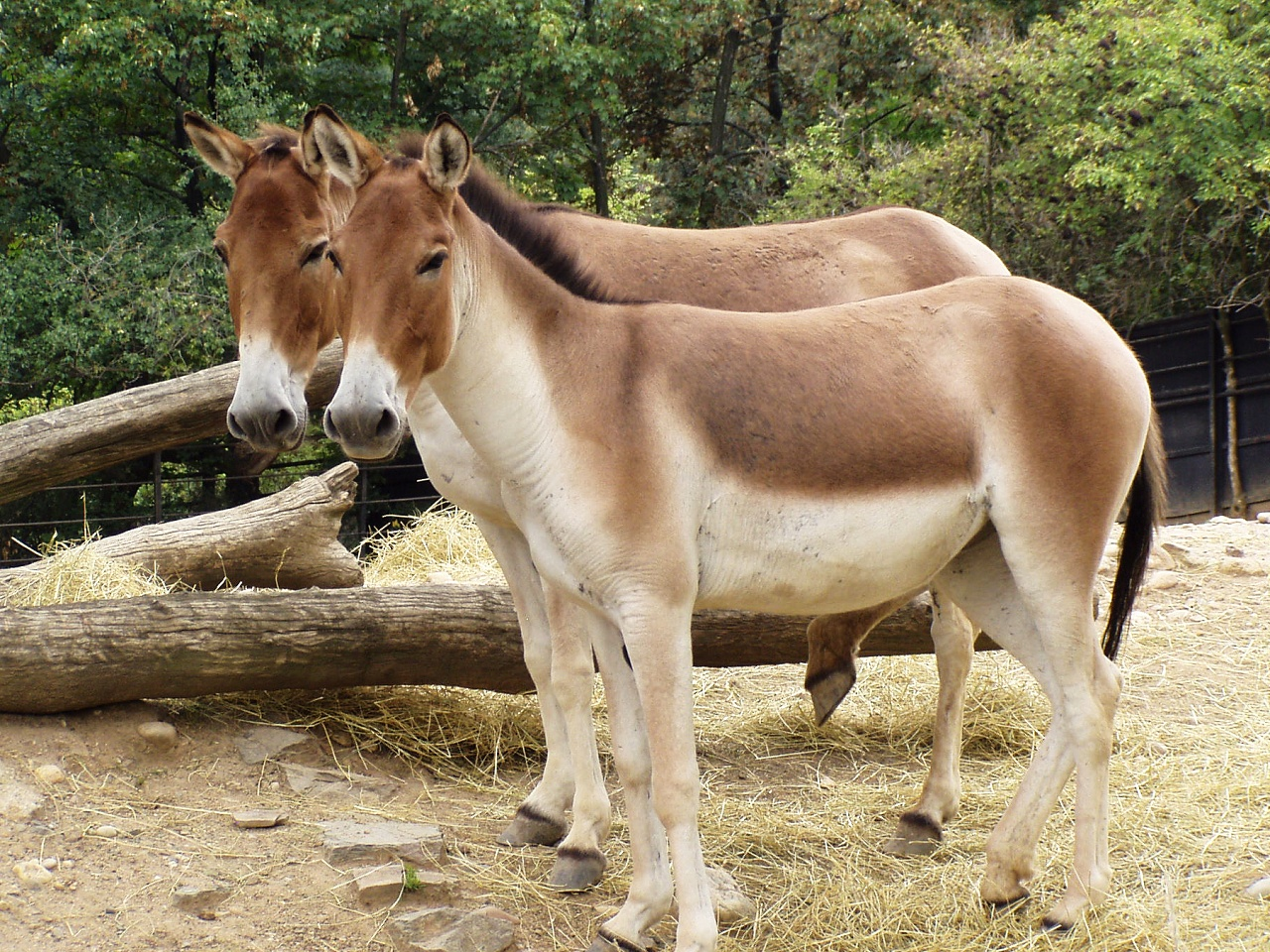
Kiangs at the Prague Zoo

Thubten Jigme Norbu, the elder brother of Tenzin Gyatso the 14th Dalai Lama, reporting on his trip from Kumbum Monastery in Amdo to Lhasa in 1950, wrote:

The kyangs or wild asses, live together in smaller groups, each headed by a stallion, lording it over anything from 10 to 50 mares. I was struck by the noble appearance of these beasts, and in particular, by the beautiful line of head and neck. Their coat is light brown on the back and whitish below the belly, and their long, thin tails are almost black; the whole representing excellent camouflage against their natural background. They look wonderfully elegant and graceful when you see them darting across the steppes like arrows, heads stretched out and tails streaming away behind them in the wind. Their rutting season is in the autumn, and then the stallions are at their most aggressive as they jealously guard their harems. The fiercest and most merciless battles take place at this time of the year between the stallion installed and interlopers from other herds. When the battle is over, the victor, himself bloody and bruised from savage bites and kicks, leads off the mares in a wild gallop over the steppe. We would often see kyangs by the thousand spread over the hillsides and looking inquisitively at our caravan; sometimes they would even surround us, though keeping at some distance.
