= Ryul Tso =

Ryul Tso and Kyun Tso are a system of twin lakes in Ladakh.

== Geography ==
The lakes are located about a mile from the Salsal La Pass (17062 ft.), on the way to Chumar, which marks the Indo-China boundary.

== Transport ==
- Hanle-Royul-Chumar Road, a 91 km black-topped motorable route, from Hanle to Chumar passes by the Ryul Tso and Salsal La (17,200 ft elevation).

== See also ==
- Geography of Ladakh
