= Miru, Ladakh =

Miru Meroo
- Village
- Location in Ladakh, India Miru (India)
- Coordinates: 33°44′23″N 77°45′23″E
- Country: India
- Union Territory: Ladakh
- District: Leh
- Tehsil: Gia
- Elevation: 3,650 m (11,980 ft)

Population (2011)
  - Total: 188

Languages
  - Official: Hindi, English
- Time zone: UTC+5:30 (IST)
- 2011 census code: 889

Miru or Meroo is a village in the Leh district of Ladakh, India. It is located in the Gia tehsil. The Leh–Manali Highway passes through Miru.

== Demographics ==
According to the 2011 census of India, Miru has 34 households. The effective literacy rate (i.e. the literacy rate of population excluding children aged 6 and below) is 56.6%.

Demographics (2011 Census)
	Total	Male	Female
Population	188	79	109
Children aged below 6 years	29	12	17
Scheduled caste	0	0	0
Scheduled tribe	188	79	109
Literates	90	44	46
Workers (all)	80	42	38
Main workers (total)	42	35	7
Main workers: Cultivators	24	21	3
Main workers: Agricultural labourers	4	4	0
Main workers: Household industry workers	0	0	0
Main workers: Other	14	10	4
Marginal workers (total)	38	7	31
Marginal workers: Cultivators	23	7	16
Marginal workers: Agricultural labourers	14	0	14
Marginal workers: Household industry workers	0	0	0
Marginal workers: Others	1	0	1
Non-workers	108	37	71

== See also ==
- Kharoo
- Geography of Ladakh
- Tourism in Ladakh
