= Murgo =

Murgo Morgo
- Town
- Location in Ladakh, India Murgo (India)
- Coordinates: 35°02′28″N 77°56′13″E
- Country: India
- Union Territory: Ladakh
- District: Nubra
- Tehsil: Diskit
- Elevation: 4,500 m (14,600 ft)

Languages
- Time zone: UTC+5:30 (IST)
- ISO 3166 code: IN-LA
- Vehicle registration: LA

Murgo near the LAC

Murgo (also called Morgo), on "Murgo Nala" near Murgo Hotspring, is a small hilly Town which lies near the Line of Actual Control in Nubra district of the union territory of Ladakh in India, close to Chinese-controlled Aksai Chin. It is one of the northernmost villages of India. The Murgo Gompa is a large Buddhist monastery at Murgo.

Murgo lies on the Darbuk–Shyok–DBO Road (DS-DBO Road) and Sasser Brangsa-Murgo Road (SBM Road) fork of Sasoma–Sasser La-Saser Brangsa-Gapsam-Daulat Beg Oldi Road (SSSG-DBO Road), both of which connect Leh to Daulat Beg Oldi. The village is inhabited by a small civilian population of Baltis, who make a living by apricot farming and yak rearing. The temperature plummets as low as -30 C in the winters. The weather deteriorates frequently with strong icy winds lashing much of Murgo. Murgo has very little vegetation or wildlife. Telecommunication at Murgo is only available through INMARSAT satellite phones. The Indian Armed Forces have significant presence in the area.

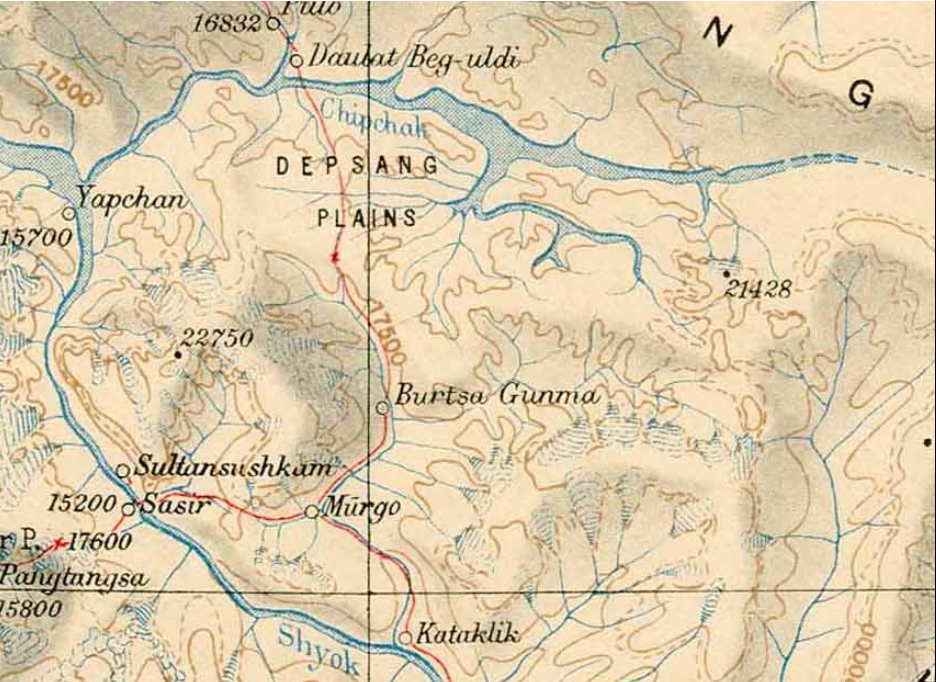
Murgo in a 1916 Survey of India map of the region

== Etymology ==
The name "Murgo" means "gateway of hell" in Tibetic languages. Record from the 1840s indicates the Turkic name was Murgai and Tibetan name was Murgo-Chumik. (Chumik means spring.) "The gateway of death" meaning for Murgo is attributed because the route between Murgo and Karakoram Pass is through a dangerous desolate barren gorge at a height of 15,000 ft which frequently experiences snowstorms, gales and blizzards which every year caused deaths of thousands of men and animals of ancient caravans on this route.

== History ==
Murgo was a campsite on the difficult caravan route through Karakoram Pass, the last place with sufficient vegetation for fuel and grass. Czech paleontologist and biologist Ferdinand Stoliczka died here in 1874 during an expedition. A memorial was erected for him in the Moravian cemetery at Leh, which still stands today. He was part of Thomas Douglas Forsyth's Lahore to Yarkand expedition.

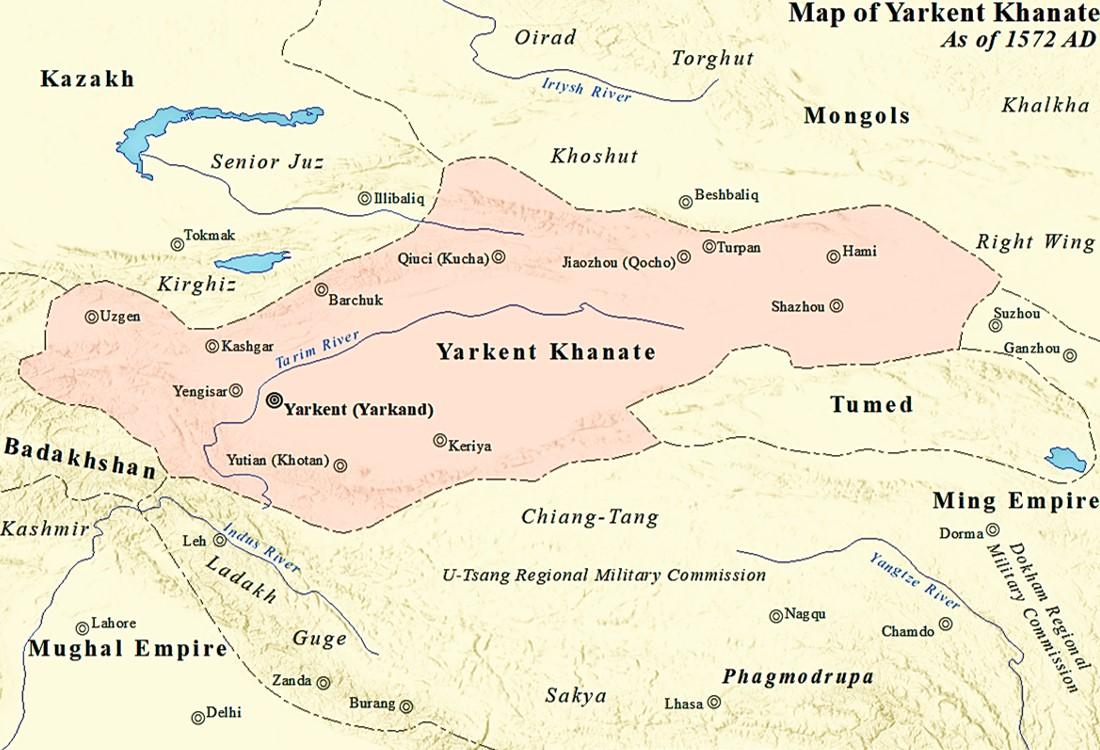
Yarkent Khanate in 1572 during rule of grandson of Sultan Said Khan Abdul Karim Khan(1560–1591).

Murgo has the ruins of an ancient breastwork fortification wall (fortification of earthwork piled up to breast height to provide protection to defenders shooting over it from a standing position), which runs along the high hill to the cliff which drops to the river. It was built during the 17th century by the governor of Nubra against the "invasions of Tibet" (presumably from Turkestan). Nearly 100 years later, Sultan Said Khan (r. 1514-1533) of Yarkent Khanate demolished it, although remnants can still be seen.

== Geography ==
Murgo has Depsang Plains in the north, Depsang Bulge (Burtsa Bulge) in the east, Chang Chenmo River in the southeast, Sultan Chushku Caravan site in the south, and Sasser Pass in the west.

Murgo, at an altitude of 14,600 ft, is barren land in the valley surrounded with black and brown mountains. It has a fresh mineral water spring.

"Murgo Nala" confluences with the Burtsa Nala. The Burtsa Nala, after receiving waters of north-to-south flowing Depsang Nala, flows west to join the west-to-east flowing "Murgo Nala" near Murgo and eventually drains into the Shyok River further south. Saser Brangsa to Murgo route along the Murgo Nala is the Sasser Brangsa-Murgo Road (SBM Road) fork of Sasoma–Sasser La-Saser Brangsa-Gapsam-Daulat Beg Oldi Road (SSSG-DBO Road). The present route of SBM Road was traditionally the summer route from Saser Brangsa (and beyond from Gapshan, DBO, Karakoram Pass to Yarkand) to Shyok village, which goes over the Shyok River by crossing it near Saser Brangsa, into the Murgo Nala valley to Chongtash Lake and "Chongtash Camp" near the large boulder brought by the glacier, Murgo, Sultan Chushku and Shyok village. The winter route from Saser Brangsa to Shyok village, goes along the Shyok River without crossing it, to Sultan Chushku and Shyok village. These routes, part of the ancient silk route, are littered with the ancient skeletal remains of mules and camels as well as the partially decomposed ancient human bodies. The camels were brought here by the Yarkandi invaders.

"Murgo Hotspring" has a local Ladakhi legend, that in a war fought here the Ladakhis pushed the Mongol invaders beyond the Depsang La. To wash their blood soaked hands, the Ladakhi warrior pierced the mountain with an arrow, causing the hot water to gush out.

Nearby Burtse area has 40 million years old marine fossils when this area was under the Tethys Sea, including the fossils of gastropods (snail-like mollusks), bivalves (shellfish) and foraminifera (mostly microscopic organisms).

== Murgo Gompa ==
The Murgo Gompa is a sub-monastery of Yarma Gompa of Drukpa Kagyu lineage. The senior to lower hierarchy of gompa administration is the Lopon, Gye-nyen, Geylong, Gye-tsul, and cun-zung.

== See also ==
- Geography of Ladakh
- Indo-China Border Roads
- Tourism in Ladakh
