= Sasoma–Saser La Road =

Border road in Ladakh near the Line of Actual Control

Sasoma–Saser Pass-Saser Brangsa-Gapsam-Daulat Beg Oldi Road (SSSG-DBO Road)
- Sasoma–Saser Pass Road

Route information
- Maintained by Border Roads Organisation

Major junctions
- From: Sasoma
- To: Sasser Pass

Location
- Country: India

Highway system
- Roads in India; Expressways; National; State; Asian

Sasoma–Sasser La-Saser Brangsa-Gapsam-Daulat Beg Oldi Road (SSSG-DBO Road) 131 km long T-70 (70 metric tons load carrying capacity) road through 17,800 feet (5,400 m) high Saser La, and its 18-km-long northwest-to-southeast fork the Sasser Brangsa-Murgo Road (SBM Road), are 30-ft-wide black-topped heavy-military-vehicle-grade motorable road between Nubra Valley and Depsang Plains (DBO-Daulat Beg Oldi) in Ladakh in India.

This strategically important road provides a much shorter alternative access from Nubra Valley to DBO as compared to the longer 230 km route via "DS-DBO Road", reducing the travel time between Nubra valley and DBO from 2 days to mere 6 hours. It also reduces Leh to DBO distance by 79 km (from 322 km to just 243 km) and travel time from two days to 11–12 hours. It has 70-tonnes load bearing capacity, and can easily handle bofors guns, tanks, and other heavy machinery.

As of July 2025, all sections were operational except Gapshan-DBO section, and the whole project will be operational by November 2026.

To provide the all-weather connectivity, the DPR (detailed project report) for 7 km long Saser La tunnel under the Saser La till Saser Brangsa was being prepared in June 2023.

== History ==
In August 2020, a dirt track was created from Sasoma to Saser La & Saser Brangsa, which was later widened to a 30 ft road after the National Board for Wildlife gave permission to allocate 55 hectares land of Karakoram Wildlife Sanctuary for the road widening. In April 2023, 2 month long black-topping of 43 km long Sasoma-Saser La section commenced. Route from Saser Brangsa to Murgo and Saser Brangsa to DBO has already black-topped and motorable in 2022–2023. Cellular confinement systems (CCS), also known as geocells, are used in construction for erosion control and soil stabilization under glacial conditions.

Border Roads Organisation (BRO)'s is responsible for constructing and maintaining this ICBR road under the Project Vijayak (Sasom-Saser Brangsa section costing INR 300 cr) and Project Himank (Saser Brangsa-Gapsan-DBO section costing INR 200 cr).

== Strategic importance ==
This road provides access to the India-held DBO and Depsang Plains, near the India-China-Pakistan tri-junction of disputed areas, which is a potential location for a joint China-Pakistan military operation against India. Being close to the disputed areas of the India-China Line of Actual Control (LAC), this strategically important road provides a much shorter alternative access from Nubra Valley to DBO as compared to the longer 230 km route via "DS-DBO Road". This road will provide second access route access to Indian Military's strategically important "Sub-sector North", which includes India's northernmost military base at DBO with world's highest airstrip, Karakorum Pass which connects Ladakh to China-occupued Xinjiang.

In response to India's expansion of road infrastructure in the India-held area, China deliberately intruded in the Indian-held area, leading to 2013 Depsang standoff. China is constructing the China-Pakistan Economic Corridor (CPEC) in Pakistan-administered Kashmir which is an area claimed by India. India also claims the nearby Trans-Karakoram Tract (Shaksgam Valley) ceded to China by Pakistan. Pakistan and China have also built the strategic Karakoram Highway, which connects Pakistan-administered Gilgit to Xinjiang.

== Route ==
The sections of SSSG-DBO Road are the 47 km long "Sasoma (near Siachen Base Camp)- Saser La section", 27 km long "Saser La-Saser Brangsa section", 42 km long "Saser Brangsa-Gapsam section" along the upstream of Shyok River which goes northeast of Saser Brangsa, and 10 km long "Gapsam-DBO section". Just after the Saser Brangsa, after crossing the 345 m long bridge over the Shyok River, the SSSG-DBO Road forks into two: 18 km long "Saser Brangsa-Murgo Road" (SBM Road) along the downstream of Shyok River which goes southeast of Saser Brangsa, and 52 km long Saser Brangsa-Gapsam-DBO route (SSSG-DBO Road) along the upstream of Shyok River which goes northeast of Saser Brangsa. These forks connect to the Darbuk–Shyok–DBO Road (DS-DBO Road) at two places: at Daulat Beg Oldi in northeast and at Murgo in southeast.

The route is as follows.

- Sasoma-Brangsa route, 68.4 km, costing Rs 300cr, completed:

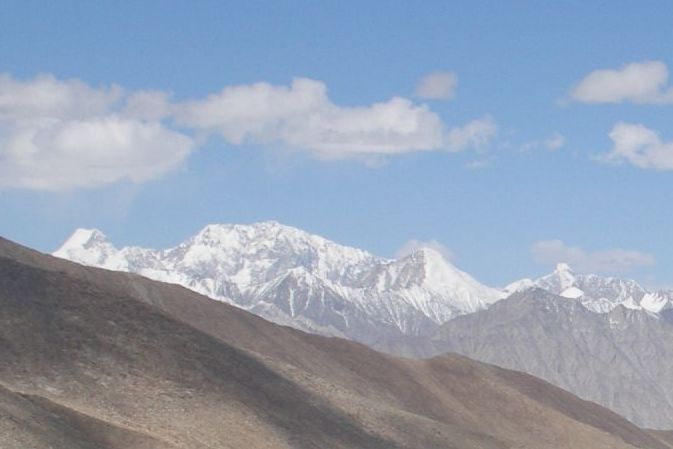
Saser Kangri III and II lie south of Sasoma-Brangsa route.

  - Sasoma-Saser La Road, 52.4 km, completed and operational since 2025.
    - Saser La Tunnel: Planned, in DPR phase, see "future section" below.
  - Saser La-Saser Brangsa Road, 16 km, competed:
- Saser Brangsa Bridge, over the Shyok River, completed:
  The 345-meter long bridge with 7 piers spans across the Shyok River which is also known as the "River of Death" due to its violent currents and severe flooding during summers and monsoons. This bridge is complete and operation as of 2025.
- Two branch routes from Saser Brangsa Bridge, completed:
  The road splits into two branch from Saser Brangsa bridge, one going north to Gapshan-DBO and the other going southeast to Murgo junction of DSDBO road.
  - Saser Brangsa-Murgo Road, 18 km, completed.
    At Murgo, this road connects to DSDBO Road. In December 2023, the 10.5 km black-top surfacing was complete and remaining 7.5 km black-top surfacing was in progress. This route was 70% complete in July 2025.
  - Saser Brangsa-DBO Road, 52 km, costing Rs 200cr:
    - Saser Brangsa-Gapshan Road, 41.97 km, completed.

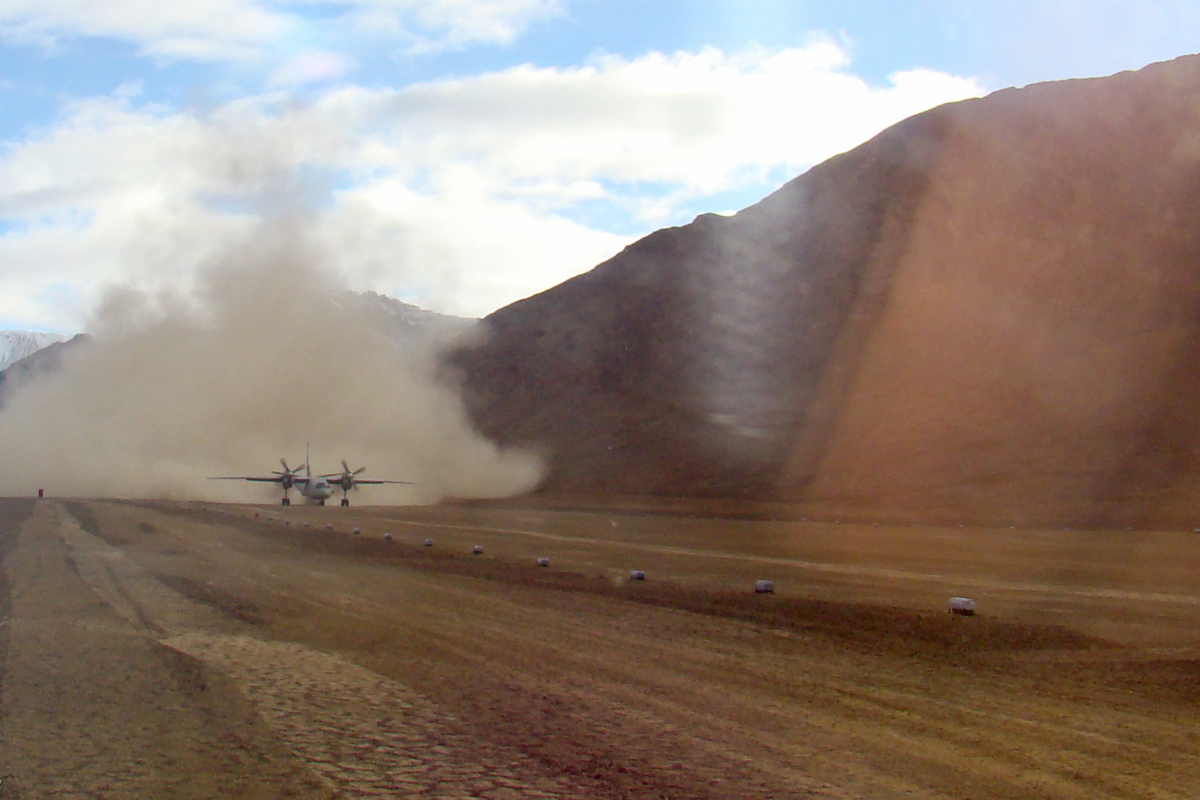
Indian Air Force Antonov An-32 taking off from Daulat Beg Oldi ALG.

    - Two branch routes from Gapshan - both of which end at the DS-DBO Road in two different locations: Gapshan or Yapshan is a halting place at the confluence of the Chip Chap River and the Shyok River. In the past, on numerous occasions, the Chong Kumdan glacier has blocked the flow of the Shyok River forming a lake called the Gapshan Lake; once the ice dam melts, the lake drains away. From Gapshan, the Shahi Kangri group of peaks dominate the plains.
      - Gapshan-DBO Road, 10 km, target completion by November 2026. At DBO, this road connects to DSDBO Road. This is the northern branch route.
      - Gapshan-Track Junction Road, 21 km: From Gapshan to Trak Junction (on DS-DBO road) being upgraded under ICBR Phase-III. This is the southern branch route.
- DBO-Karakoram Pass Road, 18 km, completed: From DBO to the Karakoram Pass, via Polu Memorial. At a campground, Polu (or Pulo/Pola) is a traditional temporary shelter built using local mud, four miles north of DBO on the DBO-Karakoram Pass Road along the DBO Nala, Maj A. M. Sethi found a memorial stone left by Dr. Philips Christiaan Visser in 1935. The memorial stone inside the tent is presently maintained by India's BRO. Karakoram Pass is one of the India-China Border Personnel Meeting Point (BPMP).

== Future development: Saser La Tunnel ==
The 4 km long route over the Saser La to Saser Brangsa is made of concrete interlocking tiles. This route over the high pass gets closed during the winter snowfall. Hence, to provide the all-weather connectivity a tunnel is planned under the Saser La, the wildlife approval for which was already granted in April 2022. In June 2023, the DPR (detailed project report) for it was being prepared.

== See also ==
- Tourist roads in Ladakh
- Tunnels in North West India
- India-China Border Roads
- Line of Actual Control
- Sino-Indian border dispute

== Bibliography ==
- Kapadia, Harish (1994). High Himalayas, Unknown Valleys (Second ed.). Indus Publishing. ISBN 81-85182-87-6 – via archive.org.
  - Kapadia, Harish (2002), High Himalaya Unknown Valleys (Fourth ed.), Indus Publishing, ISBN 978-81-7387-117-7
- Kapadia, Harish (2005), Into the Untravelled Himalaya: Travels, Treks, and Climbs, Indus Publishing, ISBN 978-81-7387-181-8
