= Shyok, Ladakh =

Shyok Shayok
- Town
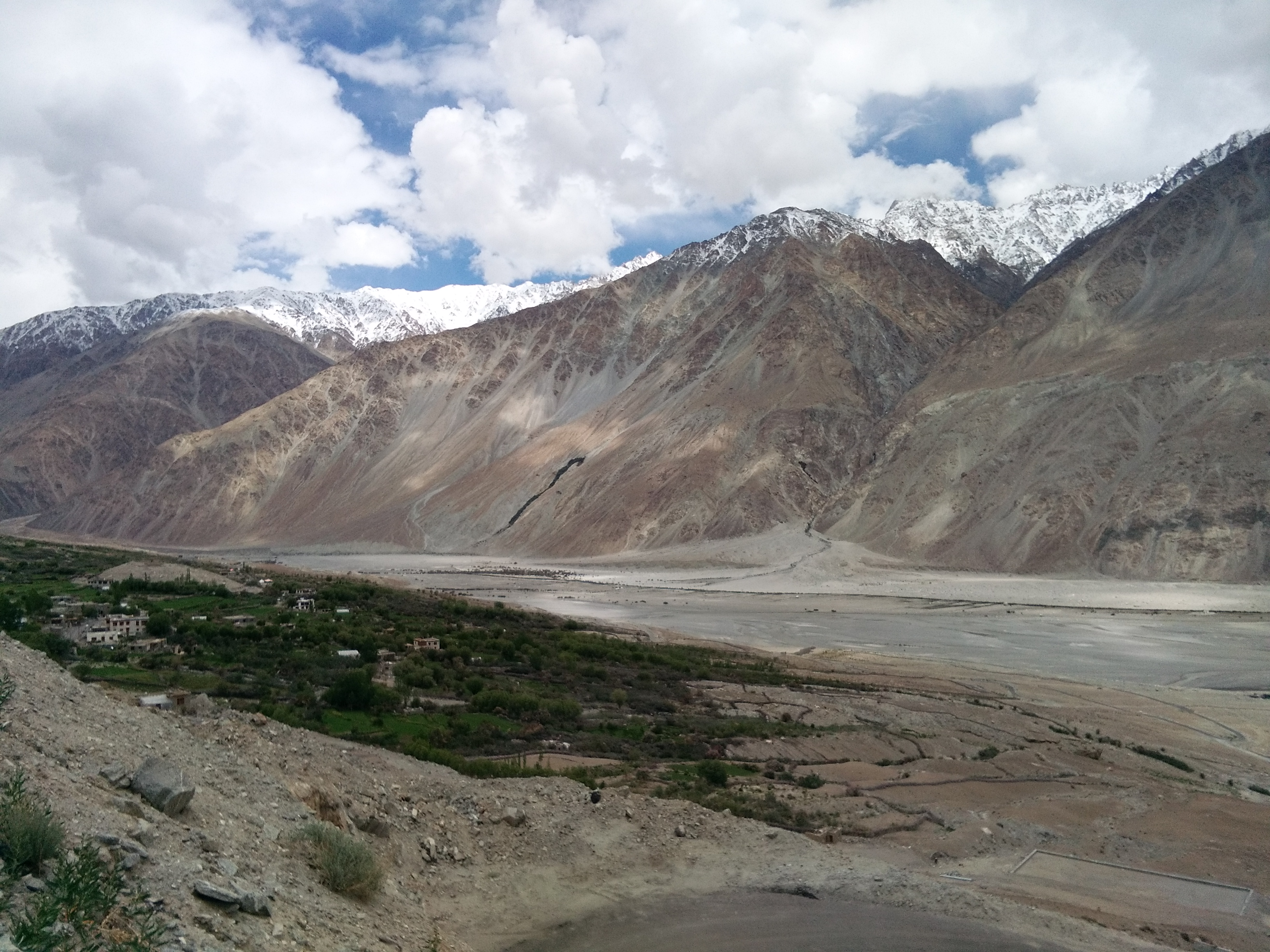
- View of Shyok and its surroundings

- Location in Ladakh Shyok (India)
- Coordinates: 34.1781°N 78.1399°E
- Country: India
- Union Territory: Ladakh
- District: Nubra
- Elevation: 3,700 m (12,100 ft)
- Time zone: UTC+5:30 (IST)

Shyok or Shayok is a Town on the bank of the Shyok River in Nubra district in Ladakh, India. It is located at the southern tip of the V-shaped course of the Shyok River, where the Tangtse river joins it from the left. Historically, the winter caravan route from Leh to Yarkand passed through the village. In modern times, India's strategic road to its border post at Daulat Beg Oldi uses the same route.

== Geography ==
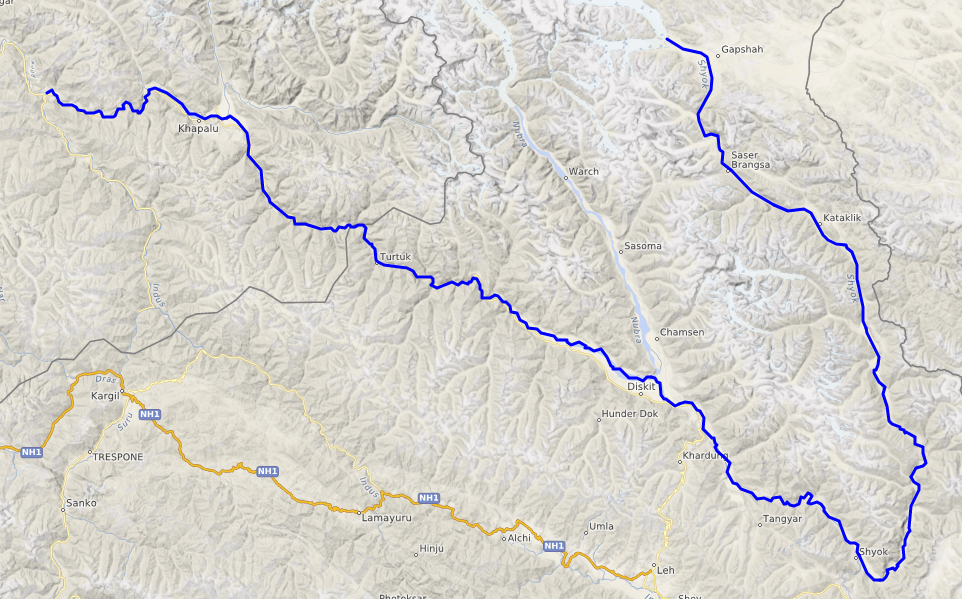
The Shyok village is at the southern tip of the V-shaped Shyok River

Shyok is connected to Durbuk, 16 km to the south, and Agham, 47 km to the north, via the Agam-Shyok-Durbuk Road, Durbuk is further connected to both Leh and Pangong via the Kharu-Pangong Road.

A northwest road connects it beyond Agham to Khalsar 73 km, Diskit 93 km, Panamik 120 km and Sasoma 133 km, along the Shyok River valley.

== Caravan route ==
Till 1937, between Ladakh and Kashgar (in Xinjiang) on Shyok-DBO route via Karakoram Pass there were frequent trade caravans.

== Strategic role ==
Shyok has geostrategic importance as it is the last Indian village on the 235 km long Darbuk–Shyok–DBO Road in the north which connects it to Daulat Beg Oldi (DBO) military post 225 km away on the China border. Shyok to BDO area is also called Sub-Sector North (SSN) by the Indian Military, and civilians are not allowed to travel from Shyok to DBO. Sasoma–Saser La Road will provide alternative connectivity to DBO.

== See also ==
- India-China Border Roads
- Line of Actual Control
- Sino-Indian border dispute
