= Hushe River =

River in Pakistan

Coordinates: 35°10′N 76°24′E

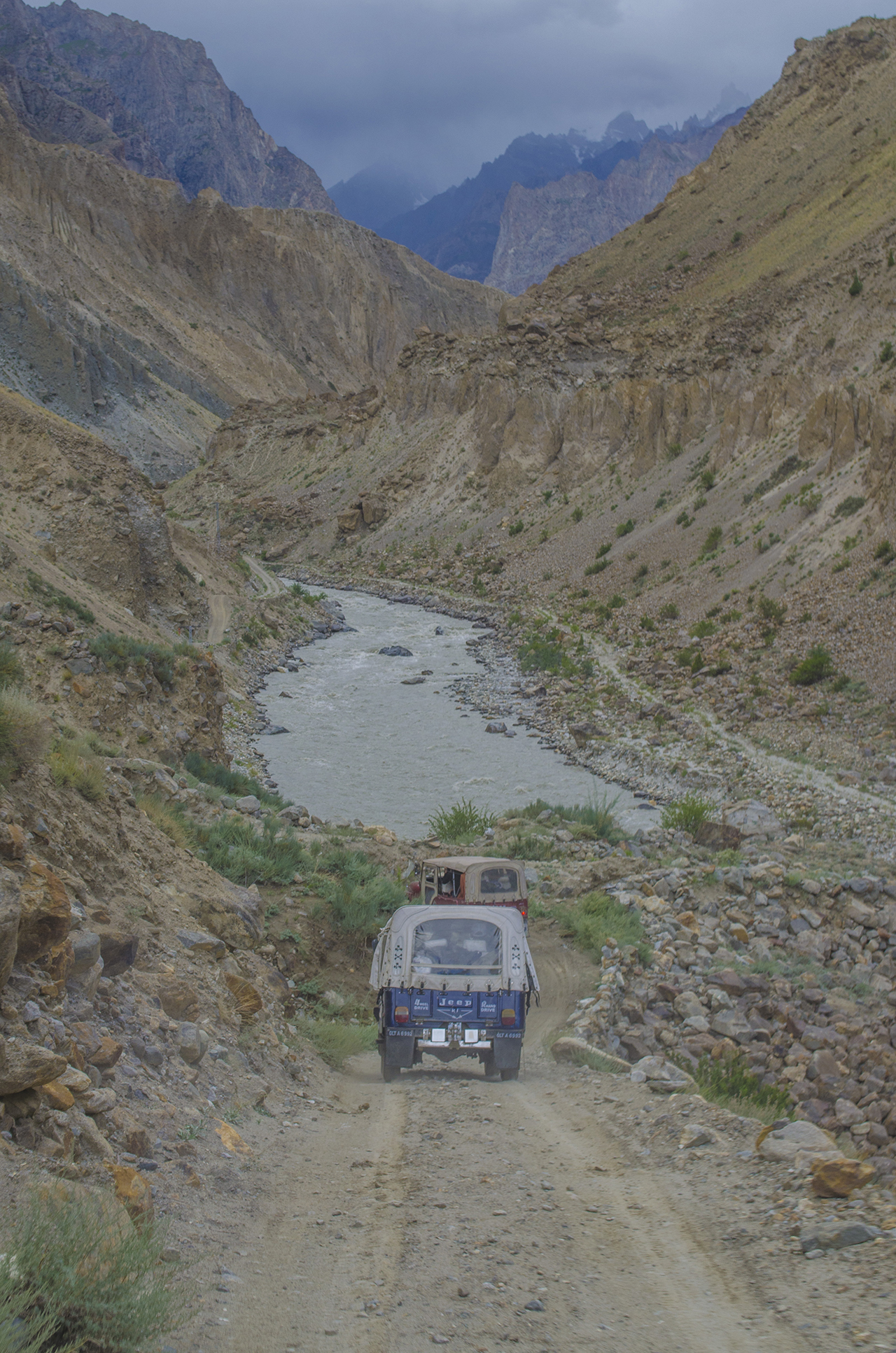
- View of the Hushe Valley of the Hushe River

Location
- Country: Pakistan
- Territory: Gilgit-Baltistan
- District: Ghanche

Physical characteristics
- Source: Gondogoro Glacier
- Mouth: Shyok River
  - location: Near Ghursay, Gilgit-Baltistan, Pakistan

Basin features
- River system: Indus Basin
- Tributaries
  - left: Saltoro River

The Hushe River is a tributary to the Shyok River which itself is a tributary to the Indus River. The main source of the Hushe River is the Gondogoro Glacier in Pakistan. Some streams also flow from other glaciers of the Hushe valley. The Hushe river joins with Saltoro River at Haldi village before joining the Shyok River. Both the Hushe and Saltoro rivers join the Shyok river at the Tsa Thang Ghursay village.
