= Darbuk–Shyok–DBO Road =

Border road in India

- Sub-Sector North Road

Route information
- Maintained by Border Roads Organisation
- Length: 255 km (158 mi)
- Existed: April 2019–present

Major junctions
- From: Leh
- Darbuk; Shyok
- To: Daulat Beg Oldi (DBO)

Location
- Country: India
- Districts: Leh district (Nubra)

Highway system
- Roads in India; Expressways; National; State; Asian
- Darbuk–Shyok–DBO Road (Note: The border is marked by the OpenStreetMap editors and may not be accurate.)

The Darbuk–Shyok–DBO Road (DS-DBO Road/DSDBO Road), also called the Sub-Sector North Road, is a strategic all-weather 322-km-long T-70 (70 metric tons load carrying capacity) road in eastern Ladakh in India, close to the Line of Actual Control with China. It connects Ladakh's capital city Leh, via the villages of Darbuk and Shyok at southern Shyok River Valley, with the Daulat Beg Oldi (DBO) post near the northern border. The 220-km long section between Shyok and DBO was constructed between 2000 and 2019 by India's Border Roads Organisation (BRO). The DS-DBO Road has reduced the travel time between Leh to DBO from 2 days to 6 hours. In January 2023, BRO announced that it is constructing the DSDBO tunnel on this route.

== History ==
=== Historic winter route ===
The Darbuk–Shyok–DBO Road traverses the historic winter route, also called the Zamistānee route, used by the trading caravans between Leh and Yarkand. Whereas the summer route would cross the Ladakh Range through the difficult Sasser Pass to reach the Shyok River valley, the winter route used to go via the banks of the Shyok River when the water flow would be much reduced and the frozen river surface could be crossed on foot as needed.

Proceeding on the right (western) bank of the Shyok River up to Sultan Chhushku, the route crossed the river to the eastern bank, and followed the valley of Murgo Nala to reach the village of Murgo. Here, the summer route also joined the winter route after crossing the Shyok River near Saser Brangsa. From here, the joint route followed Burtsa Nala and Depsang Nala to reach the Depsang Plains and went on to the Karakoram Pass via Daulat Beg Oldi. (Note: The summer caravan route is marked on the map provided by Maj. Gen. Vombatkere.)

=== 2000-2019: Construction of modern road ===
The construction was initiated in 2000, with a revised deadline of 2014. However, in 2011, an inquiry by the Chief Technical Examiner found that three-quarters of the road had been laid on the river bed, which is unsuitable for military use. A new Border Roads Task Force from Jammu was then commissioned to realign the constructed road on higher ground and to complete it. The revamped project was scheduled for completion in 2017 but was eventually completed in April 2019. The old alignment was used in the intervening period during the winter months.

=== Sino-Indian border dispute ===
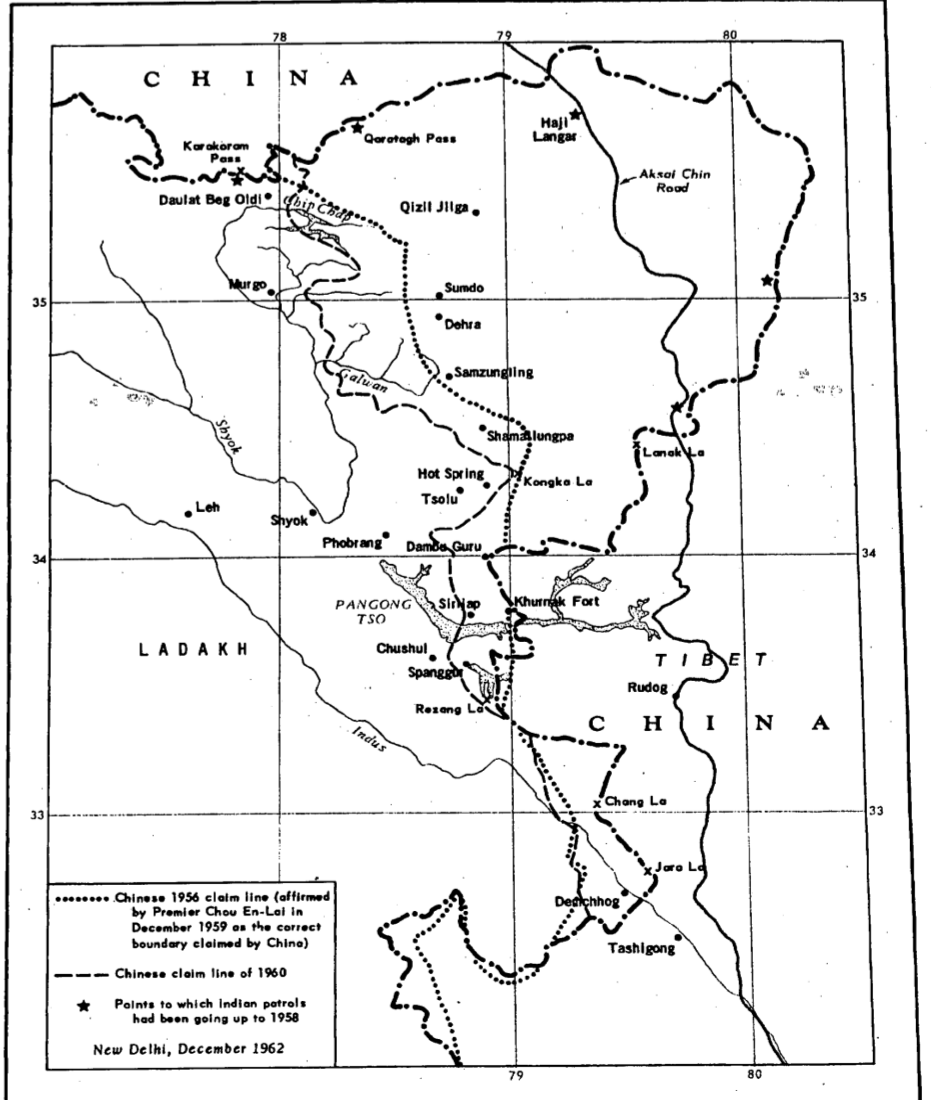
Chinese claim lines in Ladakh

Near Burtsa, where the Depsang nala joins the Burtsa Nala, the Line of Actual Control has been disputed by China and India. (Note: The terminology varies. Some writers refer to Raki nala that joins from the east as "Burtsa nala" as well. The Chinese call the river "Tiannan".)

China's 1956 claim line as well as the 1960 claim line leave the entire Burtsa Nala (Tiannan river in Chinese nomenclature) in Indian territory. However, the People's Liberation Army's papers are said to document a so-called "line of actual control on 7 November 1959" which runs within an earshot of the DS–DBO Road. Since 2013, they began to assert this line as the operative LAC. The Chinese claim that they reached their line in 1962 and withdrew 20 kilometres as part of ceasefire, but the area was "unjustly occupied by India" in later years.

During the border standoff in 2020, the Chinese forces again stationed themselves near a location called "Y-junction" or "bottleneck" in the Burtsa Nala valley, and blocked the Indian troops from patrolling to the east of it. China was claiming 250 square kilometres of new territory that India was previously accessing, while also posing threat to the DS-DBO Road.

== Route ==
The BRO road begins near the village of Shyok, which is on the west bank of the Shyok River after its V-shaped bend. Shyok already has roads leading west, to Leh via Darbuk, and south, leading to Pangong Tso. The BRO road crosses the Shyok river to its right bank and rounds the corner, continuing along its right bank due north (on the west side of the river bed).

After passing the historic campsites of Chhumed, Mundro and Mandaltang, it crosses the river near Sultan Chhushku. A 430-metre-long bridge over the full width of the river bed has been constructed and named the 'Colonel Chewang Rinchen Setu'. (Note: The bridge has been named after a hero of Ladakh, Chewang Rinchen, who organised the Ladakhi resistance to the Gilgit Scouts invasion during the Indo-Pakistani War of 1947. He received Maha Vir Chakra, India's second highest military honour, twice in his life time.)

After the Setu, the road goes through the valley of Murgo Nala to reach the village of Murgo, then the valley of Burtsa Nala to reach the camping site of Burtsa, and then Depsang nala to pass by Qizil Langar, close to the Line of Actual Control with China. After Qizil Langar, the road enters the Depsang Plains on a more or less straight route to the Dault Beg Oldi.

== Tourism ==
Murgo, along this road, has the Murgo Hotspring, Murgo Gompa of Drukpa Kagyu lineage, remnants of 400 years old breastwork fortification wall (fortification of earthwork piled up to breast height to provide protection to defenders shooting over it from a standing position) built by the governor of Nubra against the invasions from Tibetan Yarkent Khanate, ancient skeletal remains of mules and camels as well as the partially decomposed ancient human bodies. The camels were brought here by the Yarkandi invaders.

Burtse area along this road is a site of 40 million years old marine fossils when this area was in the Tethys Sea. The fossils found here include the gastropods (snail-like mollusks), bivalves (shellfish) and foraminifera (mostly microscopic organisms).

== Future upgrades: - DSDBO Tunnel ==
DS-DBO Tunnel (DSDBO Tunnel), is being constructed by the BRO on DS-DBO route. It was announced in January 2023, when it was in the DPR (detailed project report) stage. This includes a cut-and-cover 400 meter long tunnel on DSDBO road in landslide zone which was completed in 15 days.

== See also ==
- Various highways to Leh and Ladakh
- Line of Actual Control
- India-China Border Roads
- Sino-Indian border dispute

== Bibliography ==
- Hoffmann, Steven A. (1990), India and the China Crisis, University of California Press, p. 93, ISBN 978-0-520-06537-6
