= Saltoro River =

River in Pakistan

Physical characteristics
- Source: Bilafond Glacier
- Mouth: Hushe River
  - location: Siachen Region, Pakistan
  - coordinates: 35°15′N 76°24′E

Basin features
- River system: Indus Basin

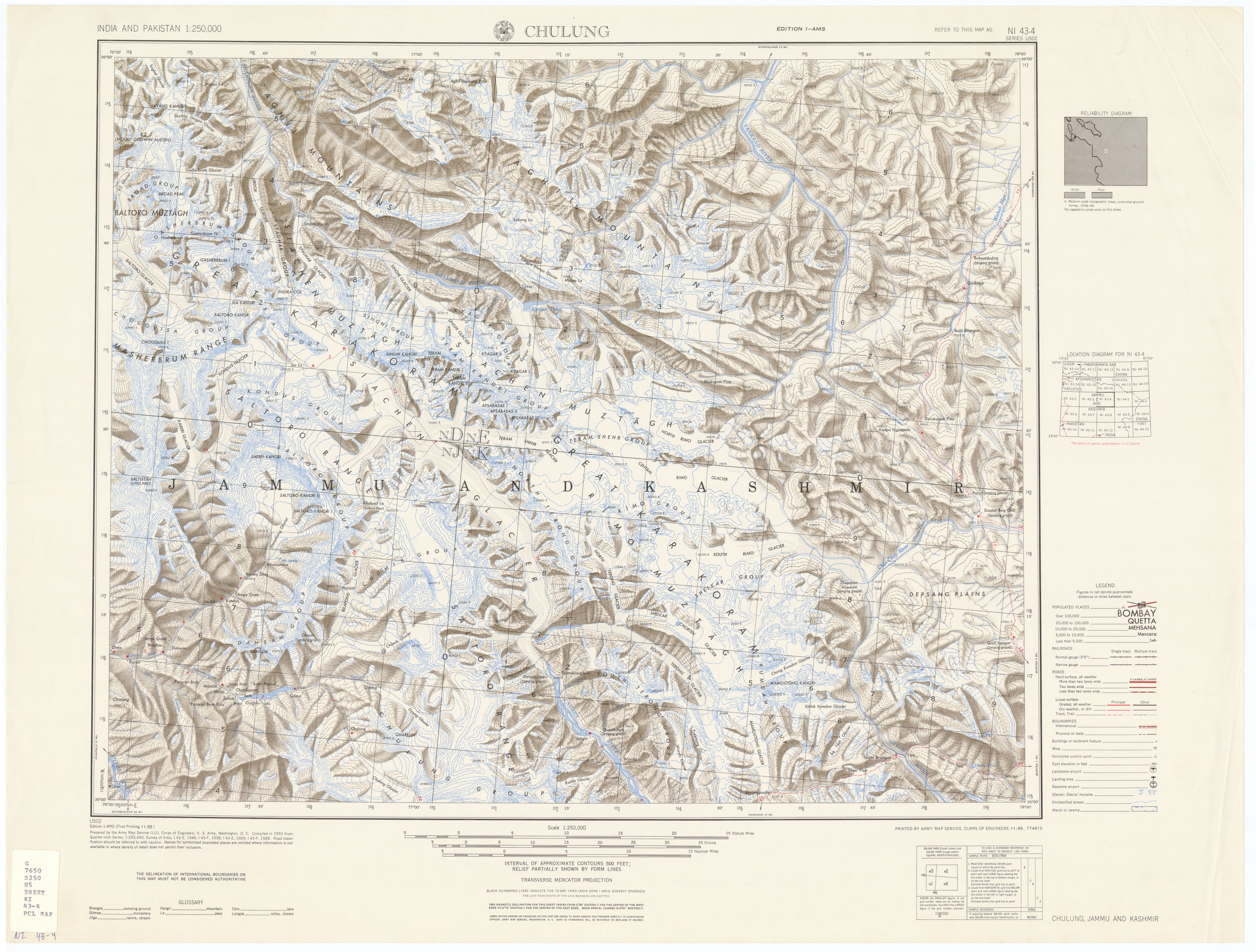
US Army map of the area; the Saltoro River is formed on the left, after the joining of Kunduz and Dansam rivers.

Saltoro River is a tributary river of Shyok River in the Siachen Region. Its main source is Bilafond Glacier in Pakistan. The Saltoro River drains into the Hushe river at Haldi village which finally discharges into the Shyok.
