= Chip Chap River =

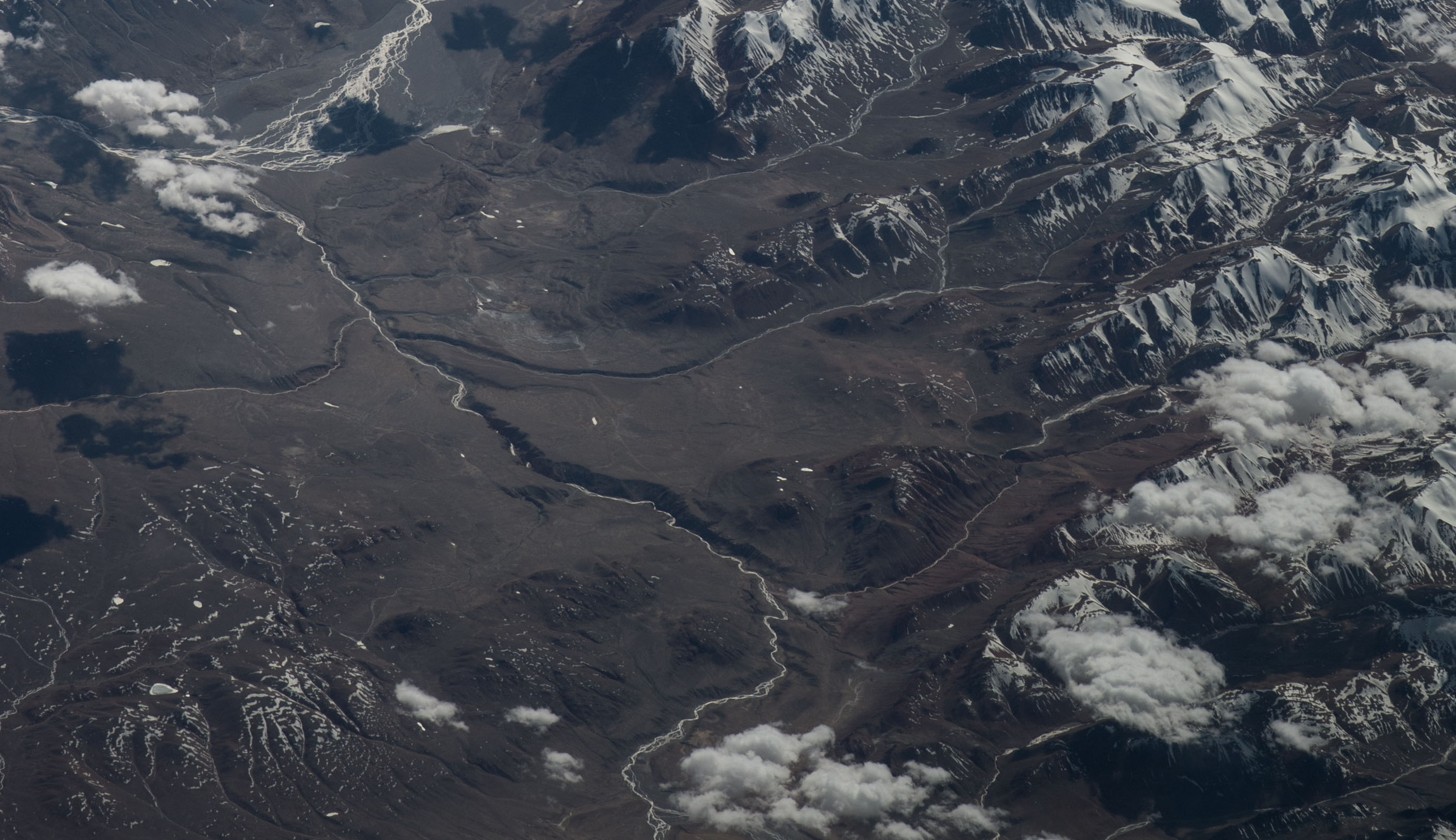

- Location of the mouth Chip Chap River (Southern Xinjiang)

Location
- Countries: China and India
- Provinces: Ladakh and Xinjiang

Physical characteristics
- Source
  - location: Aksai Chin
  - coordinates: 35.3175°N 78.3990°E
  - elevation: 5,290 metres (17,360 ft)
- Mouth
  - location: Shyok River
  - coordinates: 35.2941°N 77.7377°E
  - elevation: 4,800 metres (15,700 ft)
- Length: 65 kilometres (40 mi)

Basin features
- River system: Indus River

The Chip Chap River (meaning: "quiet river") (Note: The original Yarkandi name was "Chipchak" river. The Ladakhi name is Tsaka Chu (salty river).) is a tributary of the Shyok River that flows from the disputed Aksai Chin region administered by China to Ladakh in India. It originates at the eastern edge of the Depsang Plains and flows west, skirting around the Depsang Plains in the north. It discharges into the Shyok River, forming one of the upstream tributaries of the Indus River.

The old caravan route between Leh and Yarkand passed through the Depsang Plains crossing the Chip Chap River. Daulat Beg Oldi on the northern bank of the river en route to the Karakoram Pass used to be a regular halting place. Although the trading caravans came to an end in the 1950s, the route continues to be a popular trekking trail.

== Course ==
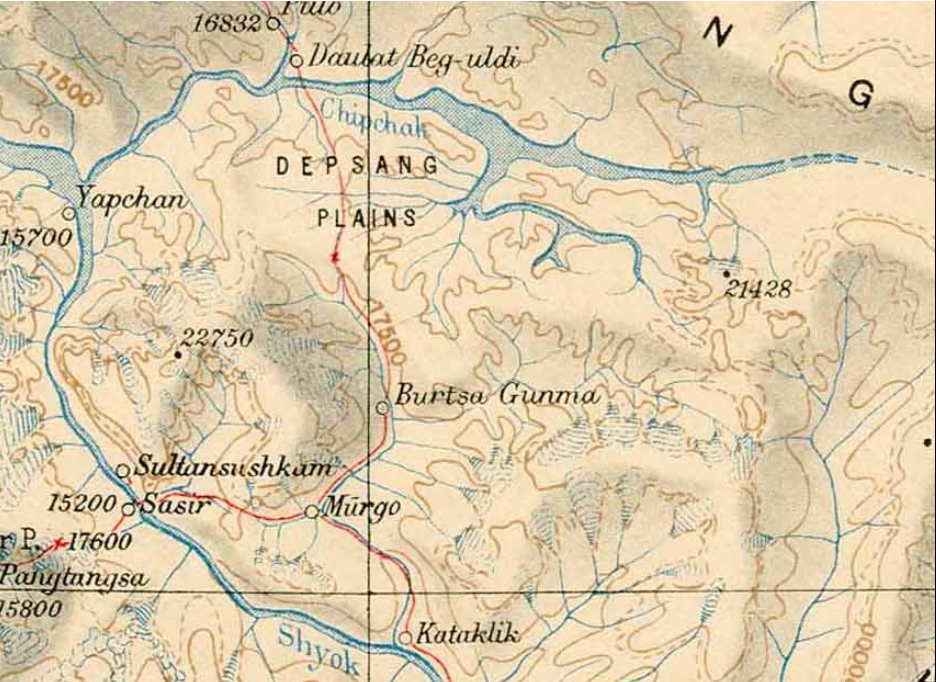
Depsang Plains (Survey of India, 1916)

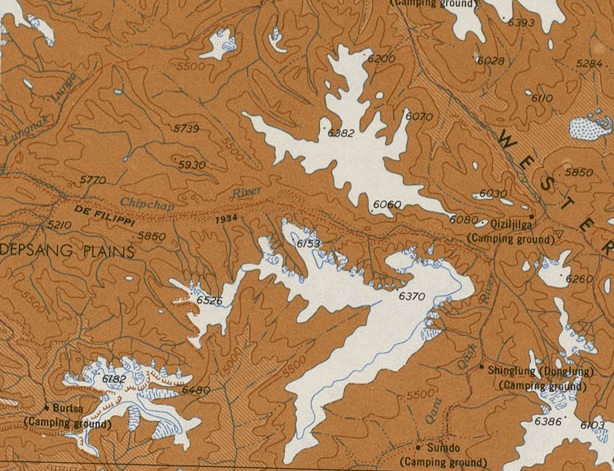
The upper course of the Chip Chap River in Aksai Chin (AMS, 1950)

The main stream of the Chip Chap River flows westwards along the northern edge of the Depsang Plains. The upper course of the river is in a relatively flat area with a drop of only 190 metres over 30 km. Several mountain streams from the south drain into the relatively stagnant pool of water in this area. Near Tianwendian more streams from the Depsang Plains join the river, bringing in water from the high mountains of Karakoram range to the west. Near the Line of Actual Control that separates the Indian- and Chinese-controlled portions of Depsang Plains, the Lungnak Lungpa stream joins from north. Another stream passing by Daulat Beg Oldi joins the river in the Indian controlled area. The combined river joins the Shyok at an elevation of about 4800 m.

The 1899 British offer to China for the border in Aksai Chin (the Macartney–MacDonald Line) placed the entire course of the Chip Chap River in the Indian territory. The 1956 claim line of China also did the same. But by 1960, China advanced its claim line to include a major portion of the Chip Chap River, coming within 4 miles of Daulat Beg Oldi.

== Sino-Indian border dispute ==
Chip Chap River and surroundings

The Chip Chap River valley played a key role in the evolution of the border conflict between China and India in 1961–62. In September 1961 India discovered that China had established a military post in the Chip Chap valley four miles east of the Indian post at Daulat Beg Oldi. China had also constructed a motorable road leading to the post. Finally, the Chinese troops attempted to capture an Indian patrol in the area. India concluded that China was attempting to extend its control to its 1960 claim line.

In response, the Indian government evolved a policy that came to be called the 'forward policy'. The government directed the Indian army to patrol as far towards the international border as possible, asking it to establish posts so as to prevent the Chinese from advancing any further west. In March–April 1962, the Indian army created posts in the Chip Chap valley as well as Depsang Plains to prevent Chinese incursions.

In May 1962 a stand-off occurred as the Chinese troops moved toward an Indian post, giving every indication of intending to attack. The Indian army asked if it should withdraw, but Prime Minister Jawaharlal Nehru asked it to hold firm and not submit to the threat of force. The Chinese troops eventually withdrew. Following a similar standoff in the Galwan valley, the commanders in Ladakh were authorised to fire on Chinese if they came too close. This happened in September 1962. When the Chinese troops came close to one of the Indian posts, the Indians opened fire at "point-blank range", killing several men. The Indian government arranged for the bodies to be returned to the Chinese without generating any publicity. This was perhaps the last major clash before the breakout of open hostilities on 20 October, after which all the Indian posts were attacked with major force and neutralised. By the end of the Sino-Indian War of 1962, the Chinese forces had occupied all the territory up to their 1960 claim line. (Note: Mohan Guruswamy has claimed that the Chinese had occupied the area in early 1950s. This is not corroborated by scholarly sources.)

== Bibliography ==
- Cheema, Brig Amar (2015), The Crimson Chinar: The Kashmir Conflict: A Politico Military Perspective, Lancer Publishers, pp. 51–, ISBN 978-81-7062-301-4
- Filippi, Filippo de (1932), The Italian Expedition to the Himalaya, Karakoram and Eastern Turkestan (1913-1914), London: Edward Arnold & Co. – via archive.org
- Hoffmann, Steven A. (1990), India and the China Crisis, University of California Press, ISBN 978-0-520-06537-6
- Lamb, Alastair (1973), The Sino-Indian Border in Ladakh (PDF), Australian National University Press
- Maxwell, Neville (1970), India's China War, Pantheon Books, ISBN 978-0-394-47051-1
- Raghavan, Srinath (2010), War and Peace in Modern India, Palgrave Macmillan, ISBN 978-1-137-00737-7
