= Haldi, Baltistan =

Haldi ہلدی
- Village
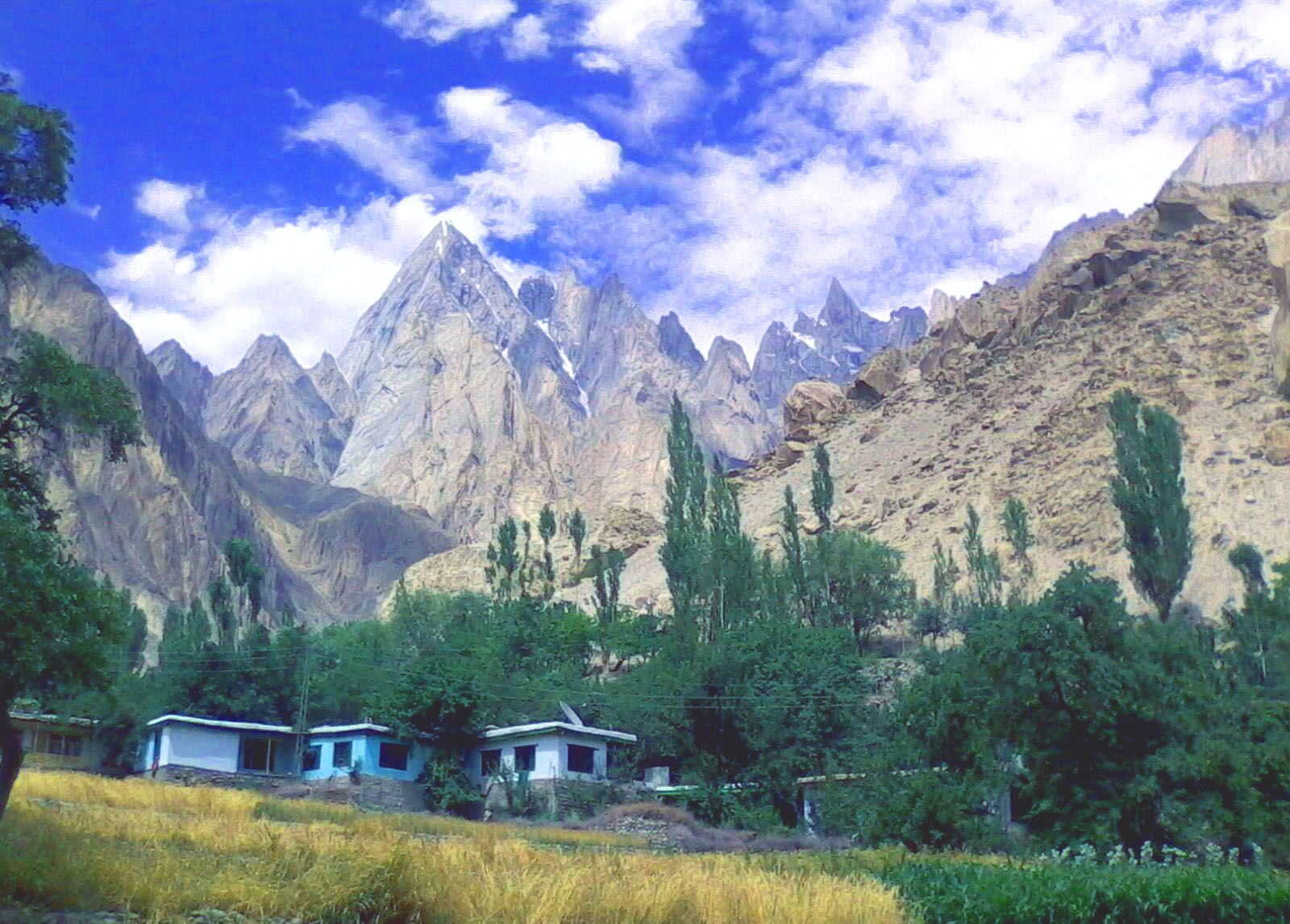
- Haldi Village

- Huldi Halde on Pakistan Map
- Coordinates: 35°15′11″N 76°25′15″E
- Country: Pakistan
- Province: Gilgit-Baltistan
- District: Ghanche
- Time zone: UTC+5 (PST)
  - Summer (DST): UTC+6 (GMT+5)

Haldi (Urdu: ہلدی) also Halde or Huldi is a village in Ghanche District of Gilgit-Baltistan, Pakistan. Haldi is a historic village of Baltistan, located at the confluence of Saltoro and Hushe rivers 28 km from the district centre Khaplu.

== History ==
According to Molvi Hashmatullah Lakhnavi, Haldi was the ancient administrative capital of the ancient Khaplu valley. Around 850 A.D. Baig Manthal came to Haldi from Central Asia through the Kondus valley. He built Stranpo Khar or Kharmang Khar in a rock. He founded the independent state of Haldi. Later he invaded Pharawa, the capital of Raja Gori tham. After taking control of all of Saltoro and Hushe valley he invaded the Khaplu valley. He became the only ruler of this region and established his capital in Haldi. Then he constructed a fort in Saling. According to Molvi Hashmatullah Lakhnavi in Tarikh e Jammu and Yusuf Hussain Abadi in Tarikh e Baltistan, Baig Manthal was the founder of the Yabgo dynasty. Now the ruins of a fort remain on the rock known as Kharmang khar where it was built by Baig Manthal. This fort was present up to 1750 A.D, as it is mentioned in Shigar Nama (an old history book of Shigar), where Hatam Khan of Yabgo had ruled. According to Greg Mortenson, American author of the book Three Cups of Tea, Haldi village was as perfect a place as Mortenson had seen in Pakistan.

== People ==
=== Johar Ali Johar ===
Known as Bowa Johar, he was a famous Balti poet. His tomb is located near Khanqah e Muallah, Haldi. He wrote nearly 70 behartaweel. He also wrote qasida, marsia, nohay, manqabat and naat in Balti language and Persian. He is also called Shehenshah e behartaweel king of Behartaweel and Firdosi e Baltistan.

== Tourism ==
Haldi Cones, a group of mountains in the Karakoram range, are one of the most popular tourist attractions in Haldi village.
