= Daulat Beg Oldi =

- Military Base
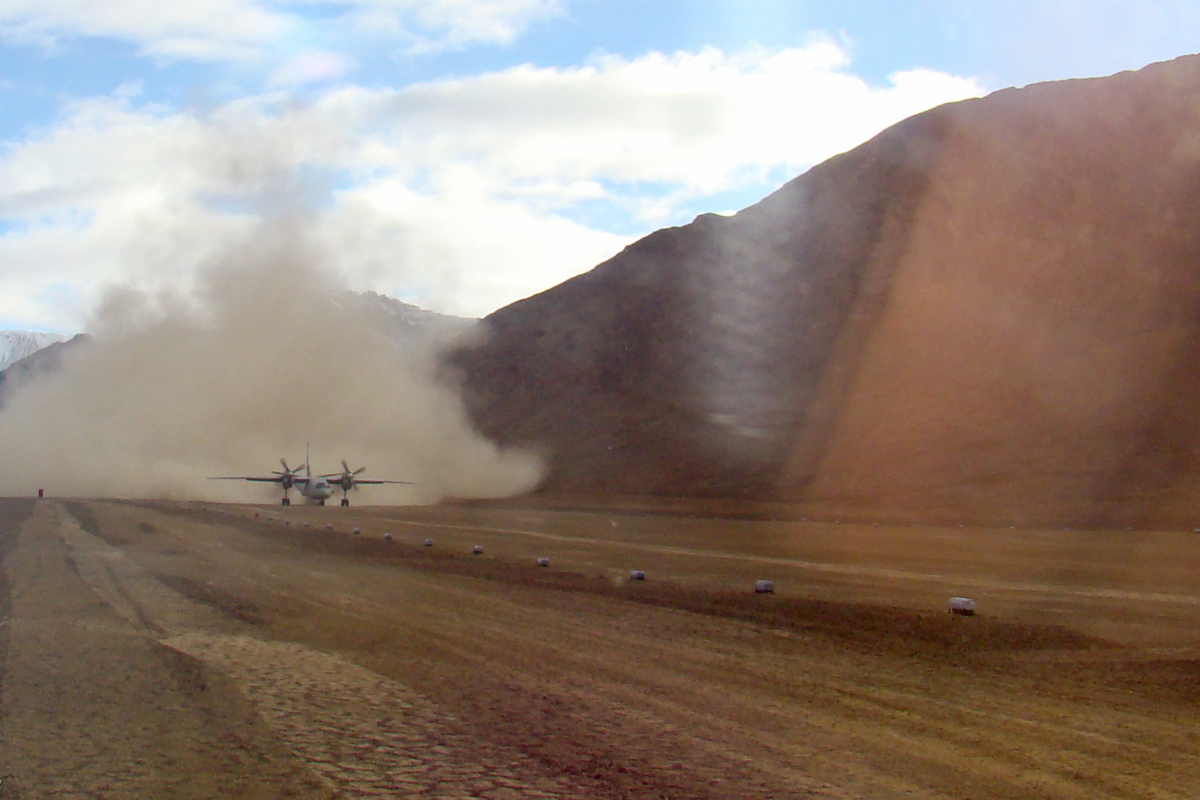
- Indian Air Force Antonov An-32 taking off from Daulat Beg Oldi ALG

- Location in Ladakh, India Daulat Beg Oldi (India)
- Coordinates: 35.390°N 77.925°E
- Country: India
- Union Territory: Ladakh
- District: Leh
- Elevation: 5,100 m (16,700 ft)
- Time zone: UTC+5:30 (IST)

Daulat Beg Oldi (also Oldie, DBO), in the Karakoram Range, is a historic campsite and current military base located in Nubra district in northern Ladakh in India. It is on the historic trade route between Ladakh and the Tarim Basin, and is the last campsite before the Karakoram Pass. It is said to be named after Sultan Said Khan ("Daulat Beg" [The Statesman]) of the Yarkent Khanate, who died here on his return journey from an invasion of Ladakh and Kashmir. Chip Chap River, the main headwater of the Shyok River, flows just to the south. The Line of Actual Control with Chinese-controlled Aksai Chin is five miles to the east.

An Indian border outpost was established here in the summer of 1960. An Advance Landing Ground was also constructed here, one of the world's highest airstrips. DBO has two road links constructed by the Border Roads Organization, the 235 km-long Darbuk-Shyok-DBO Road, and the Sasoma–Saser La-DBO Road which provides an alternate and the shortest route to DBO from the Nubra Valley.

== Location and physical conditions ==
Daulat Beg Oldi and Depsang Plains
(and the "traditional customary boundary" declared by China in 1960).

Daulat Beg Oldi (DBO) lies at the northeastern corner of the Karakoram Range, at the northern edge of Depsang Plains at an elevation of 5,100 metres (16,700 ft). Karakoram Pass on the international border with China is 8 km to the north and the Line of Actual Control with Chinese-controlled Aksai Chin is 9 km to the east. Other than Siachen Glacier military bases, DBO is India's northernmost settlement. The nearest civilian town is Murgo to the south, which has a small population of Baltis.

The temperature plummets as low as -55 C in the winters. The weather deteriorates frequently with strong icy winds lashing much of DBO. DBO has very little if any vegetation or wildlife. Communication is possible only through INMARSAT (satellite) phones.

== History ==
=== Expedition of Said Khan (Etymology) ===
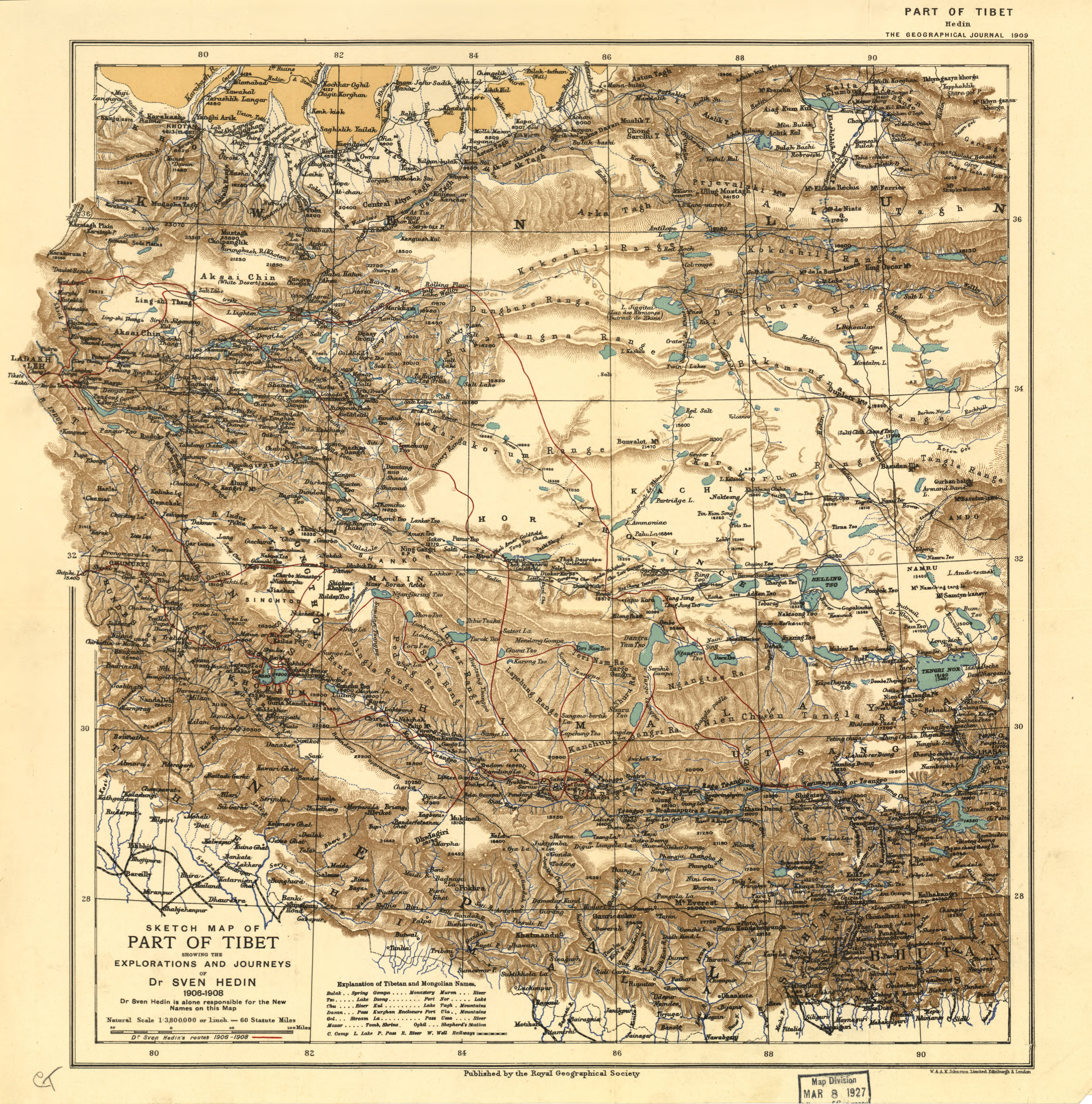
Map of the expeditions of Sven Hedin (1906-8) including Daulat Beg Oldi (labeled as Daulat Beguldi) (RGS, early 20th century)

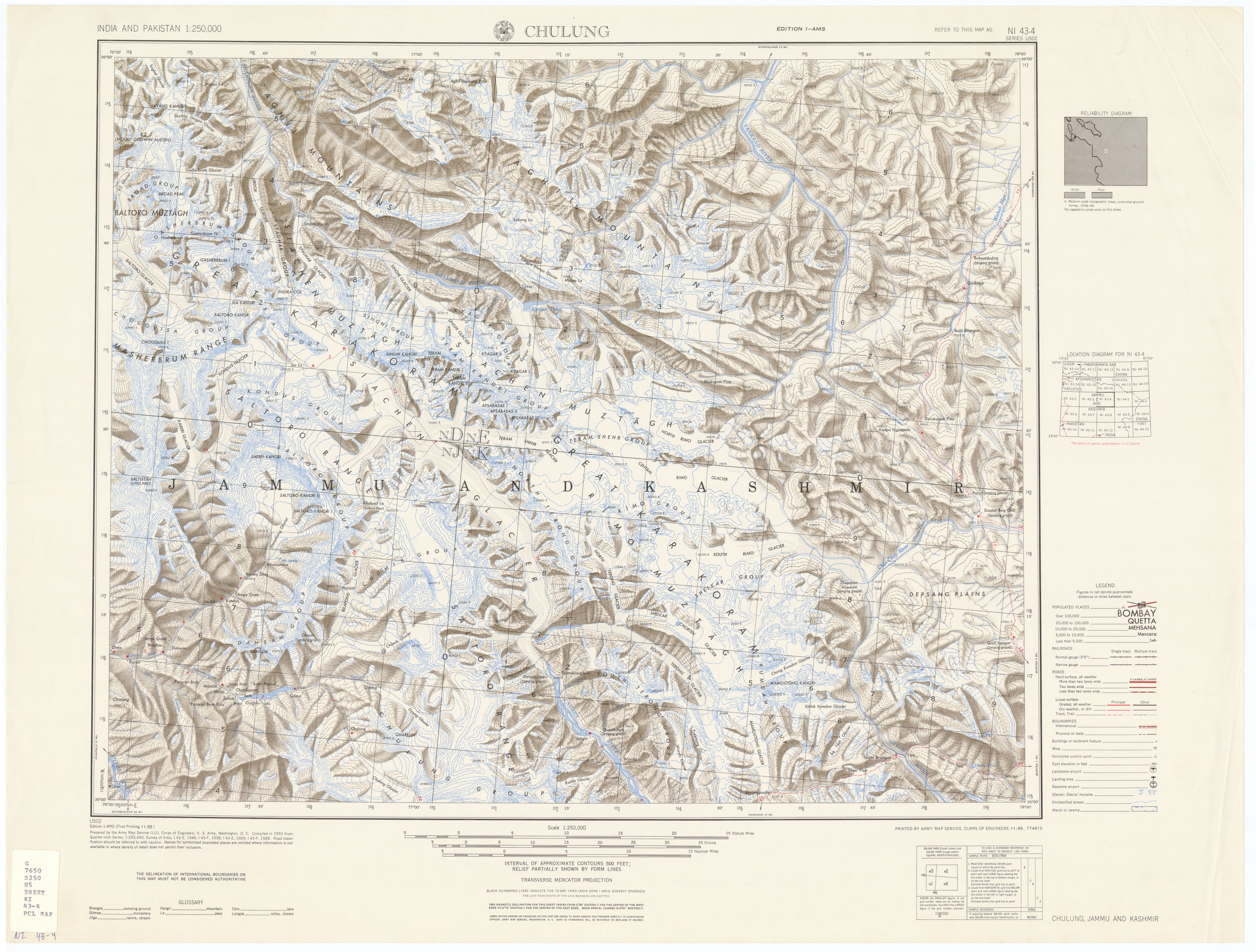
Map including Daulat Beg Oldi (AMS, 1953) (Note: From map: "THE DELINEATION OF INTERNATIONAL BOUNDARIES ON THIS MAP MUST NOT BE CONSIDERED AUTHORITATIVE")

Daulat Beg Oldi literally means "spot where the great and rich man died" in Turki. There are various folklore about whom this refers to—such as the tale about this place being the location where a large caravan was destroyed, or the tale about this place being the burial site of a rich man and his treasure.

According to British colonial-era surgeon Henry Walter Bellew, Daulat Baig Oldi means "the lord of the state died here", and the "lord" was early 16th-century Sultan Said Khan of the Yarkent Khanate. Said Khan purportedly died at this place while returning to Yarkent from a campaign in Ladakh. He is sometimes given the title of Ghaza for his military expeditions.

The account of this military expedition was recorded by his general, Mirza Muhammad Haidar Dughlat, who was the Sultan's first cousin, in the history titled Tarikh-i-Rashidi (تاریخ رشیدی) (History of Rashid).

In autumn 1531 (Safar 938 AH), Sultan Said Khan left Yarkand with Haidar and a few thousand men. On first crossing the Karakorum, the Sultan fell ill with severe altitude sickness, but managed to recover. In the course of a few months of campaigning, they were able to devastate Nubra Valley. As winter approached, they split forces. The Sultan left for Baltistan; Haidar left for Kashmir. In Baltistan, the Sultan encountered a population of friendly Muslims, but he turned on them, killing and enslaving them, possibly because they were Shiites which orthodox Yarkandi Sunnis considered heretic. On the way to Kashmir, Haider defeated the Dras near Zoji La. In Kashmir, he and his troops were hosted by the king of Srinagar. In the spring, the two parties met up again in Maryul, and the Sultan decided to return to Yarkand, but instructed Haider to conquer Tibet for Islam before his departure.

On his way back to Yarkand in the summer of 1533 (end of 939 AH), the Sultan once again suffered severe altitude sickness. This time he succumbed near Karakoram Pass. Bellew argues that the location of his death was at Daulat Beg Oldi. News of the sultan's death led to a bloody struggle for the succession, ending in the ascension of Abdurashid Khan. Abdurashid Khan recalled the forces in Tibet and exiled Haidar. By then, Haidar had had some successes against the Changpa Tibetans of Baryang, but his forces suffered greatly from the altitude and elements. By the time the army returned to Yarkand, of the original several thousands, fewer than a dozen were left. The exiled Haidar took refuge with his maternal aunt in Badakhshan. He eventually joined the ranks of the Mughal Empire, where he wrote the Tarikh-i-Rashidi.

=== Modern era ===
The trade route via the Karakoram Pass was used by caravans traveling between Leh and the Tarim Basin. Daulat Beg Oldi was a halting point for the caravans. Filippo de Filippi, who explored the area in 1913–1914, described:

But on the other hand the caravans come and go incessantly, in the summer, in astonishing numbers. The first one of the season passed on June 28th, coming from Sanju on the Yarkand road; then more and larger ones came; in July there were four in one day, almost all travelling from Central Asia toward Leh—the Ladakhis usually do their trading at home. The caravans were of all sizes, from small groups of 3 or 4 men with 5 or 6 animals to large parties with 40 or more pack-animals; the men on foot or riding asses, the better-to-do merchants on caparisoned horses ...

Filippi also wrote that the experienced caravaners passed through the Depsang Plains without stopping, travelling a distance of 31 miles between Daulat Beg Oldi and Murgo in a single day. Others stopped, either at Qizil Langar to the south of Depsang La, or at Burtsa further south.

The trading caravans declined during the 1940s during tensions in Xinjiang (Chinese Turkestan) and completely stopped in the 1950s. In 1953, the Indian consulate in Kashgar was closed down. Indian prime minister Jawaharlal Nehru told the Parliament that the Chinese wished to treat Xinjiang as a "closed area". Subsequently, China built the Xinjiang–Tibet Highway through Aksai Chin.

== Sino-Indian border dispute ==
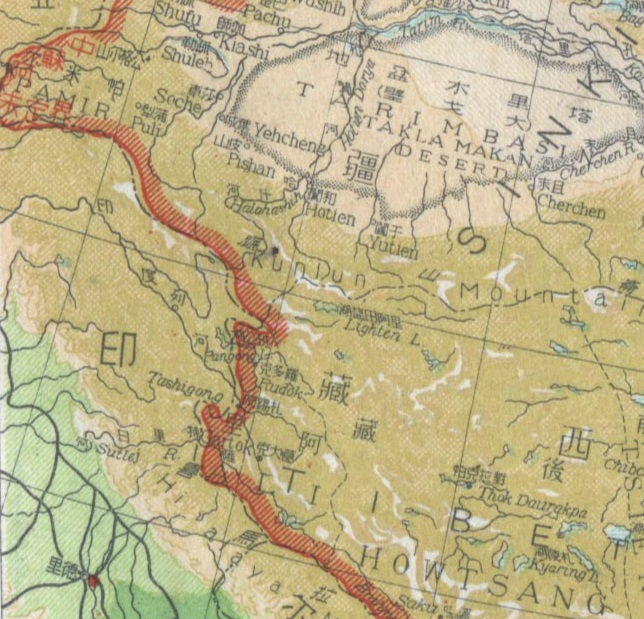
Ladakh border claimed by the Republic of China in a 1947 map. (Note: Even though the map is of very low resolution, it is apparent that the Chip Chap River is shown entirely within Ladakh. Qaratagh-su, a stream that flows down from the Qaratagh Pass and joins the Karakash River is shown as the source of Karakash. Karackattu, The Corrosive Compromise (2020, Figure 1) gives more detailed maps showing Samzungling and Galwan river as part of Ladakh.)

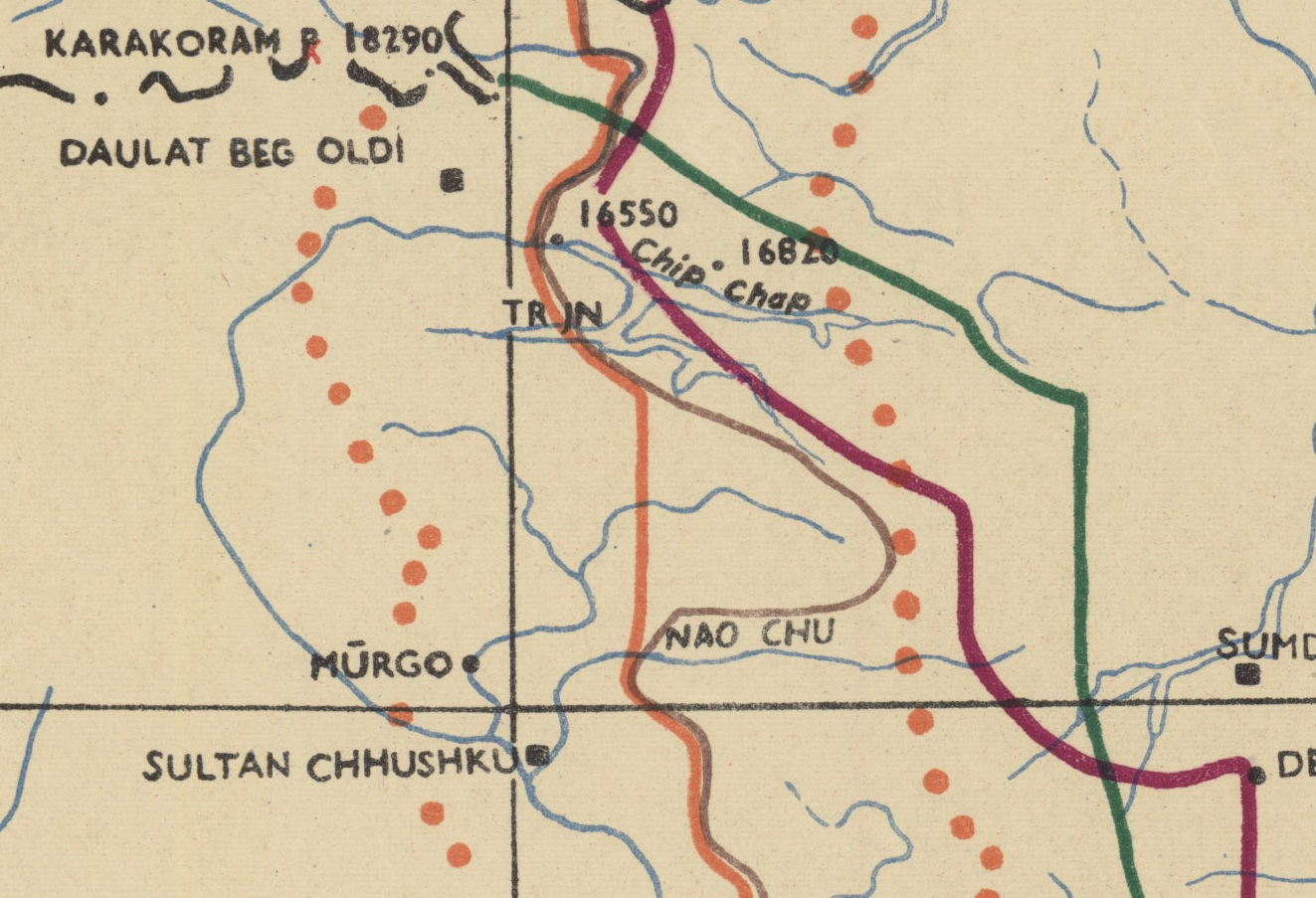
Chinese claim lines in the Depsang Plains: 1956 claim line in green, 1960 claim line in dark brown, 1962 ceasefire line in orange. (Note: Map by the US Army Headquarters in 1962. In addition to the two claim lines, the blue line indicates the position in 1959, the purple line that in September 1962 prior to the Sino-Indian War, and the orange line, which largely coincides with the dark brown line, the position the end of the war. The dotted lines bound a 20-km demilitarisation zone proposed by China after the war.) (Note: The purple line's intersection with the Galwan valley indicates the location of a Chinese 'Day 9' post, whose domination by an Indian post on higher ground caused an "apogee of tension".)

The Republic of China (1912–1949), having faced a revolution in Tibet in 1911, apparently made secret plans to acquire Aksai Chin plateau in order to create a road link between Xinjiang and Tibet. These plans began to get manifested in public maps only towards the end of its rule.

While the Republic of China claims included the Aksai Chin proper, they stopped well behind the Karakoram mountains, leaving all the rivers that flow into the Shyok River within India, including the Chip Chap River. (See map.) Communist China also published the "Big Map of the People's Republic of China" in 1956 with a similar boundary, now called the 1956 claim line.

However, in 1960 China advanced its claim line further west, dissecting the Chip Chap River. The Chinese said little by way of justification for this advancement other than to claim that it was their "traditional customary boundary" which was allegedly formed through a "long historical process". They claimed that the line was altered in the recent past only due to "British imperialism". (Note: But the military justification for the advancement is not hard to see. The 1956 claim line ran along the watershed dividing the Shyok River basin and the Lingzitang lake basin. It conceded the strategic higher ground of the Karakoram Range to India. The 1960 claim line advanced it to the Karakoram ridge line despite the fact that it did not form a dividing line of watersheds.)

Meanwhile, India continued to claim the entire Aksai Chin plateau.

=== 1960–1962 ===
A border post was established at Daulat Beg Oldi (DBO) in 1960 under the supervision of the Intelligence Bureau (IB). By September 1961, the Chinese had established a post in the Chip Chap Valley about 4 miles east of the DBO post as well as roads leading to it. The Indian Army then set up posts at Burtsa, Qizil Langar, at a 'track junction' in the Depsang Plains and at Sultan Chushku. These were intended to block any further extension of Chinese roads. The Intelligence Bureau post at DBO was also reinforced with an Army unit.

The DBO post was fired upon by Chinese forces during the Sino-Indian War on 21 July and 4 August 1962.

=== 1962–present ===
In April 2013, a platoon-sized contingent of the People's Liberation Army established a campsite 30 km southeast of DBO, a location in the Indian military's "DBO sector." In reference to their own perception of the LAC's location, India initially claimed that the Chinese camp was 10 km on their side, later revising this to a 19 km claim, and claimed that Chinese military helicopters had violated Indian airspace during the incident. In early May, both sides withdrew their units further back.

== Telecommunications ==
High-speed public 4G/5G mobile and internet connectivity was made available in early 2025.

== Transportation ==
=== Advanced Landing Ground ===
Daulat Beg Oldi Advanced Landing Ground
- IATA: none; ICAO: none

Summary
- Airport type: Military
- Operator: Indian Airforce
- Location: Ladakh, India
- Elevation AMSL: 16,730 ft (5,100 m)
- Interactive map of Daulat Beg Oldi Advanced Landing Ground

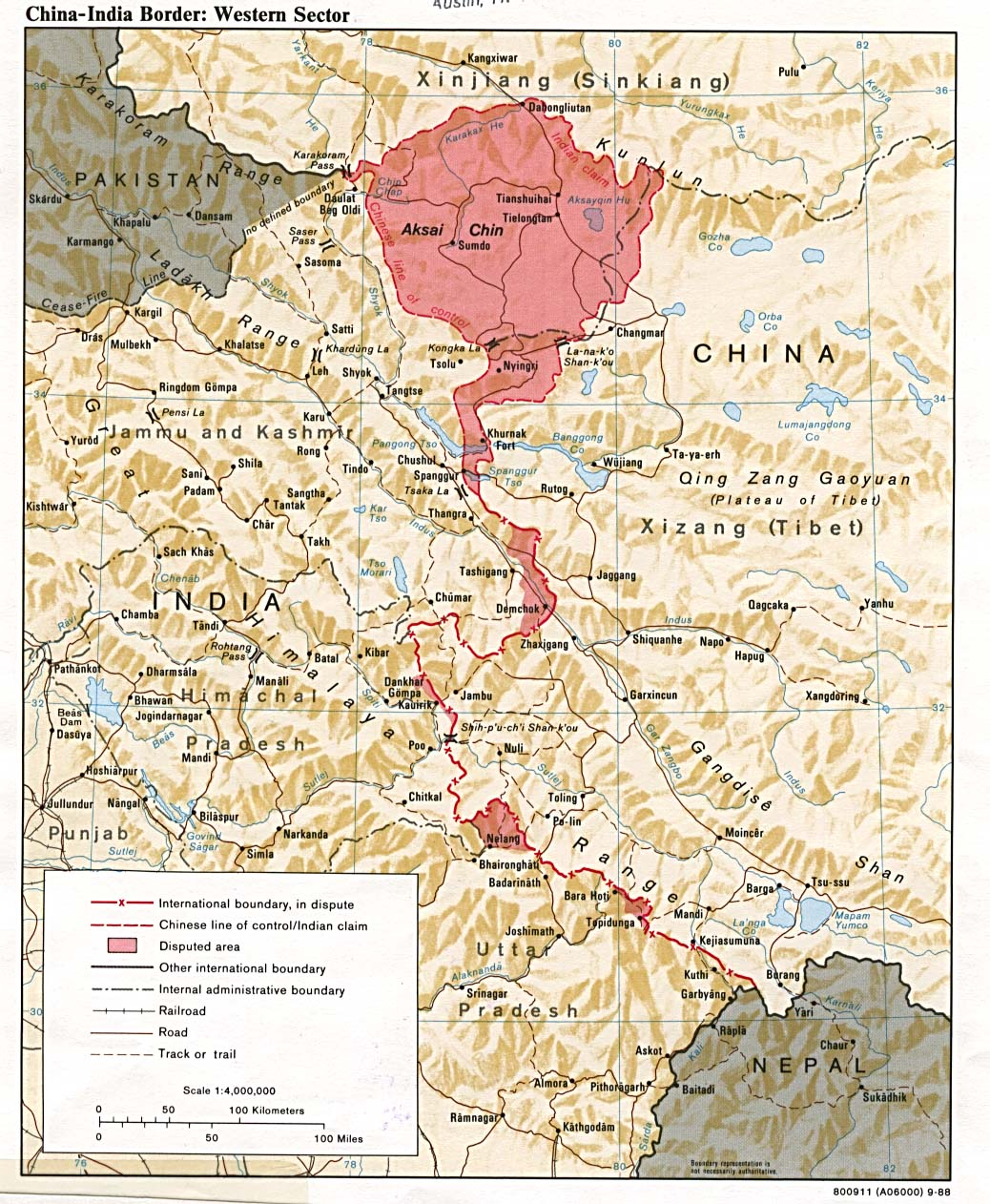
Daulat Beg Oldi shown in the northernmost part of Ladakh (1988 CIA map).

The Indian Army maintains helipads and a gravel airstrip here, the highest airstrip in the world. Routine sorties are carried out using An-32 aircraft to provide relief and supplies to the troops stationed nearby. The base was established during the Sino-Indian conflict in 1962, with the first landing by Squadron Leader C.K.S Raje who set a record for the world's highest aircraft landing at the time. It was operated with American-supplied Fairchild Packets from 1962 to 1966, when it had to be closed down suddenly when an earthquake caused loosening of the surface soil, making the area unsuitable for fixed-wing aircraft. Work was undertaken to make the airfield operational again, and was marked on 31 May 2008, when an Indian Air Force An-32 landed.

The Indian Air Force first landed transports here between 1962 and 1965 and then after a gap for 43 years, the IAF started landing at DBO in 2008. In a significant demonstration of its capabilities, the Indian Air Force landed a C-130J Super Hercules transport aircraft in Daulat Beg Oldi on 20 August 2013, thirty kilometers from where the 2013 Daulat Beg Oldi Incident took place in April 2013. This landing could qualify as a world record for a medium-lift aircraft landing at this altitude.

=== DS-DBO Road ===
In 2001, the Indian government decided to construct a motorable road from Leh to Daulat Beg Oldi. The road was completed in 2019. The 255-km is Darbuk-Shyok-DBO Road (DS-DBO Road) runs at elevations between 4,000 and 5,000 metres (13,000–16,000 ft). It follows the old winter caravan route via the Shyok River valley going via Murgo, Burtsa Nala and Depsang Plains. The travel time is said to be six hours.

=== Sasoma–Saser La-DBO Road ===
Sasoma–Saser La Road to DBO provides a much shorter alternative access from Nubra Valley to DBO as compared to the longer 230 km route via "DS-DBO Road", reducing the travel time between Nubra valley and DBO from 2 days to mere 6 hours.

=== Connection with Border Personnel Meeting Hut ===
While an alternate route to connect Daulat Beg Oldi with the Border Personnel Meeting Hut was approved by the Standing Committee of the National Board for Wildlife (SC-NBWL) in October 2024 for quick troop and logistics movement, the actual construction of a 10.26 km (6.38 mi)-stretch of a road link for this purpose was approved later, in July 2025.

The overall 130 km (81 mi)-long link named Sasoma–Sasser La–Sasser Brangsa–Gapshan–DBO link would serve as an alternative to the DS-DBO Road and will aid troop movement between DBO and Siachen Base Camp. The road has nine bridges which are currently capable of carrying weights of up to 40 t (88,000 lb) with plans to convert then to Class-70 bridges in coming future to assist in movements of heavy armoured vehicles. The construction and maintenance is being assigned to the Border Roads Organisation (BRO) under Project Vijayak (Sasoma–Sasser Brangsa) at cost of ₹300 crore (US$31 million) and Himank (Sasser Brangsa–DBO) at a cost of ₹200 crore (US$21 million).

As of July 2025, the road's construction was complete from Sasoma to Sasser Brangsa and until east of Murgo and Gashpan. All types of artillery guns were transported upto the point to test the capacity and all have been a success. While 70% of the works are completed, the road is expected to be operationalised by October–November 2026, following which it will serve between March and September during the summers. However, a tunnel at 17,800 ft (5,400 m) Sasser La is being proposed to provide all-year, all-weather service. Following clearance by government, an estimated 4–5 years is expected to operationalise the proposed tunnel.

As of September 2025, India has accelerated infrastructure at Daulat Beg Oldi, including new road alignments, 70-tonne bridge upgrades, and optical fibre connectivity to forward posts. These measures reduce travel time, enhance logistics, and strengthen operational preparedness along the Line of Actual Control.

== India-China Border Meeting point ==
Daulat Beg Oldi – Tianwendian is the highest of the five officially agreed Border Personnel Meeting points between the Indian Army and the People's Liberation Army of China for regular consultations and interactions between the two armies, which helps in defusing stand-offs. The first meeting at this location was held on 1 August 2015 (PLA Day). The events included a Chinese cultural programme and other ceremonies meant to improve relations. Later in the month, India hosted a delegation from the PLA on the occasion of Indian Independence Day and celebrated with traditional songs and dances from Indian culture, Gatka martial arts, and motorcycle acrobatics performed by the Indian Army Corps of Signals. The first ceremonial BPM ever held on New Year's Day was here in 2016.

A meeting hut was constructed approximately a year after the meeting point was opened.

== See also ==
- Fukche Advanced Landing Ground
- China National Highway 219
- Depsang Plains
- Thoise
- Tianwendian
- India-China Border Roads
- List of locations in Aksai Chin

== Bibliography ==
- Fisher, Margaret W.; Rose, Leo E.; Huttenback, Robert A. (1963), Himalayan Battleground: Sino-Indian Rivalry in Ladakh, Praeger – via archive.org
- Hoffmann, Steven A. (1990), India and the China Crisis, University of California Press, ISBN 978-0-520-06537-6
- Kler, Gurdip Singh (1995), Unsung Battles of 1962, Lancer Publishers, ISBN 978-1-897829-09-7
- Hudson, G. F. (1963), "Aksai Chin", Far Eastern Affairs, St. Antony's Papers, vol. 14, London: Chatto & Windus
- Karackattu, Joe Thomas (2020). "The Corrosive Compromise of the Sino-Indian Border Management Framework: From Doklam to Galwan". Asian Affairs. 51 (3): 590–604. doi:10.1080/03068374.2020.1804726. ISSN 0306-8374. S2CID 222093756.
- Mullik, B. N. (1971), My Years with Nehru: The Chinese Betrayal, Allied Publishers
- Raghavan, S. (27 August 2010). War and Peace in Modern India. Palgrave Macmillan UK. ISBN 978-0-230-24215-9.
- Sandhu, P. J. S.; Shankar, Vinay; Dwivedi, G. G. (2015), 1962: A View from the Other Side of the Hill, Vij Books India Pvt Ltd, ISBN 978-93-84464-37-0
- Van Eekelen, Willem Frederik (1967), Indian Foreign Policy and the Border Dispute with China, Springer, ISBN 978-94-017-6555-8
  - Van Eekelen, Willem (2015), Indian Foreign Policy and the Border Dispute with China: A New Look at Asian Relationships, BRILL, ISBN 978-90-04-30431-4
