= Bilafond Glacier =

Glacier in Pakistan

- بلا فوند گلیشیر
- Location within Karakoram Location within Gilgit Baltistan Location within Pakistan Location within Ladakh Location within India
- Interactive map of Bilafond Glacier
- Type: Mountain glacier
- Location: Karakoram range, Gilgit-Baltistan, Pakistan
- Coordinates: 35°17′N 76°53′E

Bilafond Glacier (Urdu: بلا فوند گلیشیر) is located in the Saltoro Mountains within the Karakoram Range in Gilgit-Baltistan, Pakistan. It is a main source for Saltoro River.

== See also ==
- Glaciers of Pakistan
