= Ghursay =

Village in Ghanche, Pakistan

Ghursay: གྷིར་སེ།; غورسے
- village
- Interactive map of Ghursay
- Country: Pakistan
- Region: Gilgit-Baltistan
- District: Ghanche
- Lowest elevation: 2,526 m (8,286 ft)

Population (2010)
  - Total: 9,000

Ghursay (Balti: གྷིར་སེ།; Urdu: غورسے) is a village in district Ghanche, in the Gilgit-Baltistan region of Pakistan. It lies about 25 km from district headquarter Khaplu. It was among the large settlements of Baltistan but river floods have reduced habitable areas. Ghursay village is also an early settlement of Baltistan. The population is about 9000 people as of 2010. The people of Ghursay are locally known as Ghursaypa (as "pa" is used as a suffix to denote where a person belongs to in almost all Balti-speaking settlements).

== Geography ==
Due to its low lying land, the village severely suffered losses due to river flood. No effective measures have been taken to reduce river flood. There are two ways to reach Ghursay. One from the Machulu side and one from the Ghazithang side. However the Ghazithang side is most commonly used due to its ease. Ghursay lies in great plains of District Ghanche which is the largest plain in Gilgit Baltistan after Deosai plains.
