= Sasoma =

- Location within Ladakh Location within India
- Coordinates: 34°53′N 77°28′E

Sasoma is a settlement in the Leh district of Ladakh in India. It is located along the Nubra River in the Nubra Valley region and consists of villages such as the Gya village. A road is being constructed from Sasoma to Saser La by the Border Roads Organisation which will be the world first glaciated motorable road once completed. Another road, the Khalsar-Sasoma road with a bridge on the Chamesahn Lungpa stream, connects Khalsar to Sasoma.
