= Yarkand (disambiguation) =

Yarkand, Yarkent, and Yarkant are spelling variants and may refer to:

- Yarkant County, a county and historical town in Xinjiang Uyghur Autonomous Region, China
- Yarkent Khanate, a Uyghur Khanate in existence 1514–1705
- Yarkand (area), a historical area (1759–1882) in Xinjiang during the Qing dynasty
- Yarkand River, a river in the Xinjiang Uyghur Autonomous Region of western China

== See also ==
- Battle of Yarkand, April 1934
- Yarkand hare
- Yarkand deer
