= Saser La =

Mountain pass in Ladakh, India

Saser Pass
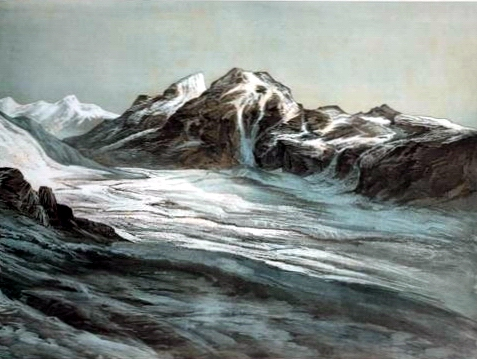
- Saser Pass, Nubra c. 1857

- Location within Ladakh Location within India
- Elevation: 5,411 m (17,753 ft)

Third Approach
- Location: Ladakh, India
- Range: Karakoram Range
- Coordinates: 35°2′N 77°44′E

Saser Pass, Saser La, or Sasser Pass (el. 5,411 m or 17,753 ft) is a high mountain pass in the Indian union territory of Ladakh on the ancient summer caravan route from Leh to Yarkand, in the Tarim Basin of Xinjiang. It leads from the head of the Nubra Valley into the upper Shyok Valley, on the way to the even higher, but easier, Karakoram Pass.

== History ==
"This was the notorious Sasser, not the highest but probably the most impressive and dangerous [of the passes along the caravan route between Ladakh and Yarkand]."

The Saser Pass could not be avoided on the caravan route in summer and took a huge toll on caravan pack animals, such as ponies and mules. It was too icy for the Bactrian camels, which were the usual pack animals to the north of the Saser Pass.

Saser Pass lies 37 km southeast of the Siachen Glacier area that the 1972 Simla Agreement between India and Pakistan failed to define clearly.
