= Shyok River =

River in India and Pakistan

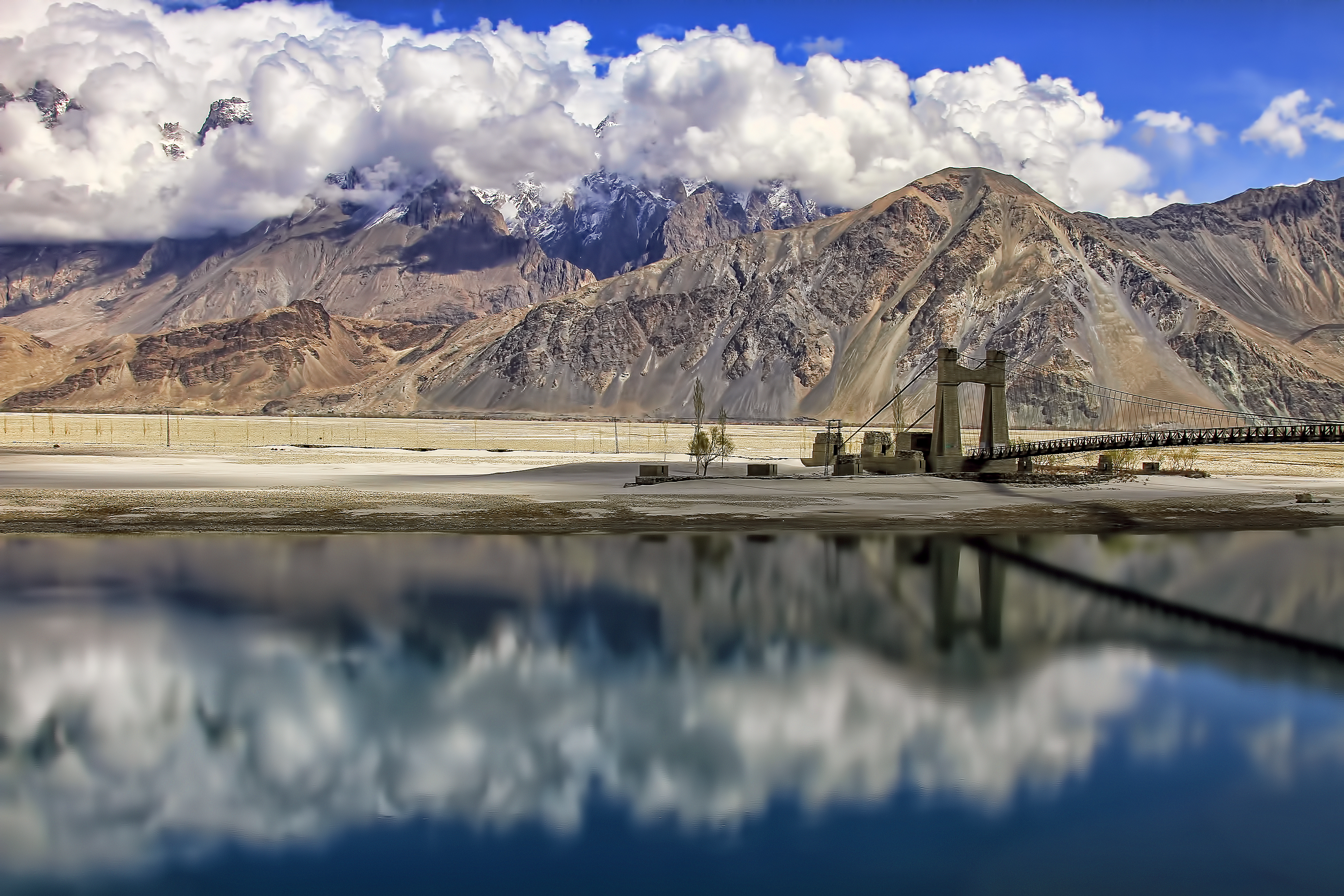
- The Shyok River near Khaplu, Gilgit-Baltistan, Pakistan

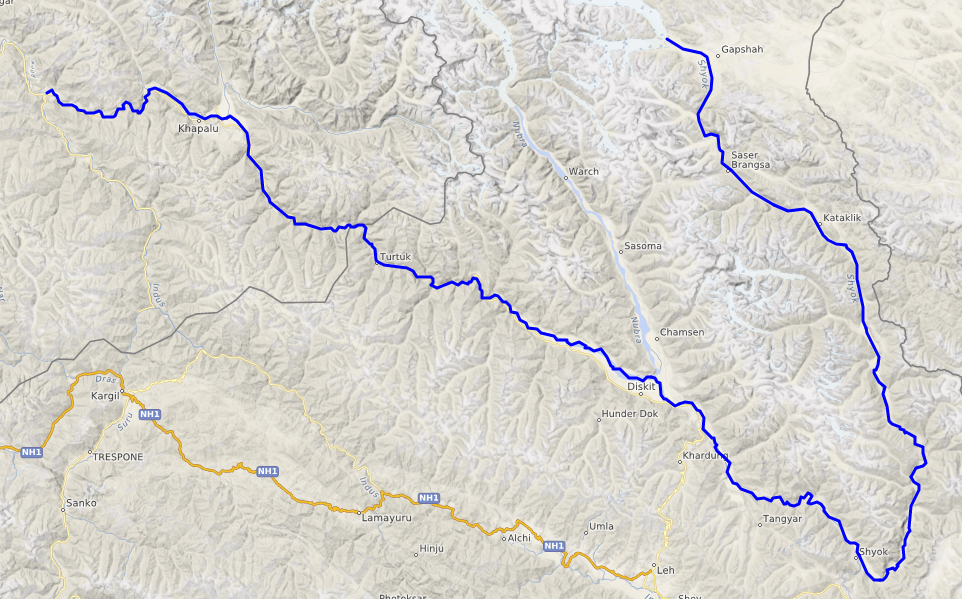
- Course of the Shyok River

Location
- Countries: India, Pakistan
- Territories: Ladakh, Gilgit-Baltistan

Physical characteristics
- Source: Rimo Glacier
  - location: Ladakh, India
  - coordinates: 35.3527°N 77.6180°E
  - elevation: 4,980 m (16,340 ft)
- Mouth: Indus River
  - location: Gilgit-Baltistan, Pakistan
  - coordinates: 35.2286°N 75.9172°E
  - elevation: 2,289 m (7,510 ft)
- Length: 550 km (340 mi)
- Basin size: 33,465 km^{2} (12,921 sq mi)
- Discharge
  - location: Yugo gauging station, Gilgit-Baltistan, Pakistan
  - average: 390 m^{3}/s (14,000 cu ft/s)
  - minimum: 180 m^{3}/s (6,400 cu ft/s)
  - maximum: 546 m^{3}/s (19,300 cu ft/s)

Basin features
- Progression: Indus→ Arabian Sea
- River system: Indus Basin
- Tributaries
  - left: Chip Chap River, Galwan River, Chang Chenmo River
  - right: Nubra River, Hushe River

The Shyok River (sometimes spelled Shayok) is a major tributary of the Indus River that flows through northern Ladakh in India and into Gilgit-Baltistan in Pakistan. Originating from the Rimo Glacier in the eastern Karakoram, it runs for about 550 km (340 mi) before joining the Indus near Skardu. Its basin, covering 33,465 km^{2} (12,921 sq mi), extends across three countries: India, Pakistan, and China. Its major tributaries include the Chip Chap, Galwan, Chang Chenmo, Nubra, and Hushe rivers.

== Name and etymology ==
At least three hypotheses have been formulated regarding the origin of the river's name, Shyok, also spelled Shayok.

In 1854, Alexander Cunningham mentioned that the river took its name from the village of Shyok, which he spelled Shayok, located along its course, but he did not substantiate this statement or provide etymological information about the village's name.

In 1977, Friedrich A. Peter observed that Shyok was a misspelling of the Tibetan name Shayog (Tibetan: ཤ་གཡོག་, Wylie: sha-gyog). He identified the name Shayog as being formed by the syllables shag (Tibetan: ཤག་, 'gravel') and gyog (Tibetan: གཡོག་, 'to spread') and meaning 'gravel spreader', alluding to the vast quantities of gravel deposited by the river's floods.

In 1992, Harish Kapadia argued that many geographical names along the historic trade route in the upper Shyok valley were of Yarkandi origin, the Turkic dialect spoken by travellers from Yarkand in Central Asia. He interpreted Shyok as meaning 'river of death', from the Yarkandi sheo ('death'), and related this interpretation to the river's deadly floods.

== Course ==
The Shyok rises from the Rimo Glacier in the eastern Karakoram, with its source located in Ladakh, India, and flows for approximately 550 km (340 mi) through Ladakh and then Gilgit-Baltistan, Pakistan, where it joins the Indus River. Its general course is south-southeastward at first, then it makes a major V-shaped bend, and continues west-northwestward.

The river originates at the snout of the Rimo Glacier in the Rimo Muztagh, a subrange of the eastern Karakoram. Its source is located west of the Depsang Plains, at approximately 35.3527°N 77.6180°E and 4,980 m (16,340 ft) elevation, in northern Ladakh, India. Near its source, it is joined by the Chip Chap River, which can be regarded as part of its headwaters.

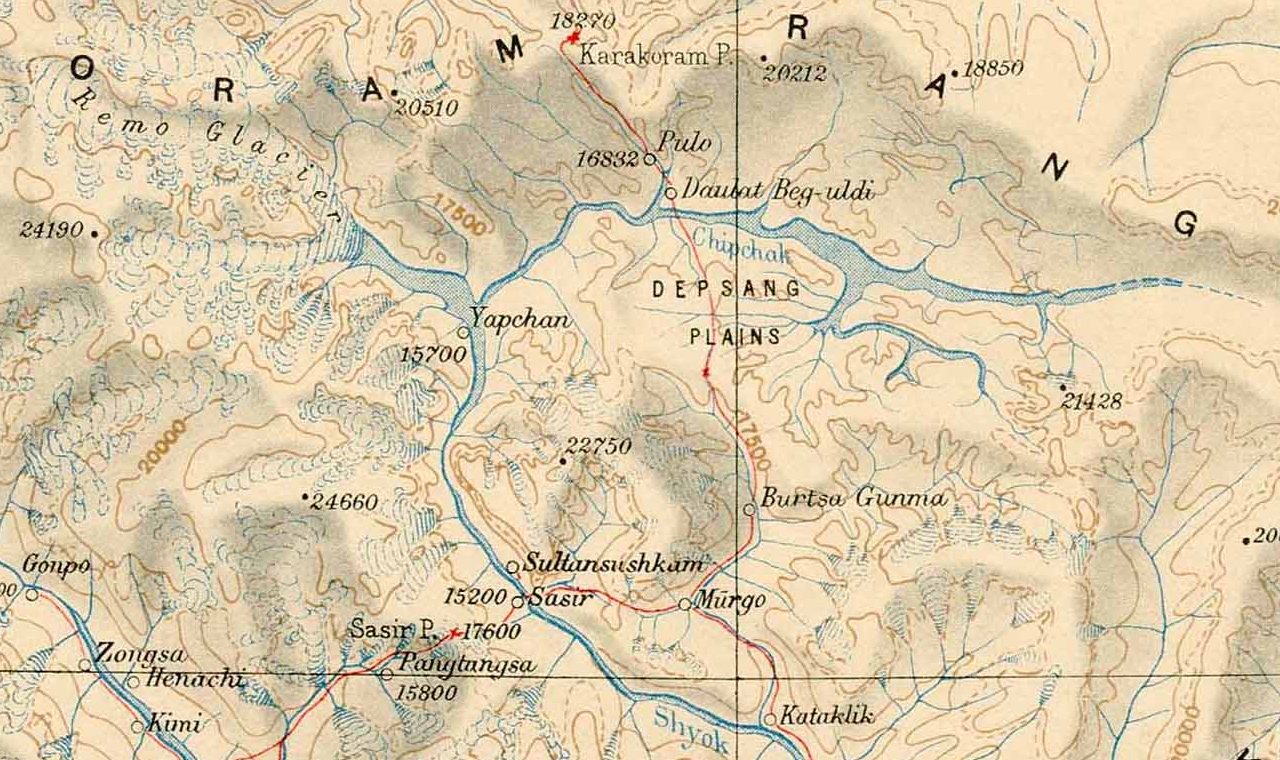
Headwaters system of the Shyok River on a 1923 reprint of a 1916 Survey of India map

From the Chip Chap confluence to its major bend, the river flows generally south-southeastward, between the Rimo Muztagh and Saser Muztagh ranges to the west and Aksai Chin to the east. About midway along this reach, it receives the Galwan River, and a little upstream of the bend, it is joined by the Chang Chenmo River. At the Chang Chenmo Range, it forms a major V-shaped bend, reversing its direction to the northwest, a distinctive feature.

After the bend, and as it approaches the confluence with the Nubra River, the valley widens and the river becomes braided. It receives the Nubra near the village of Diskit.

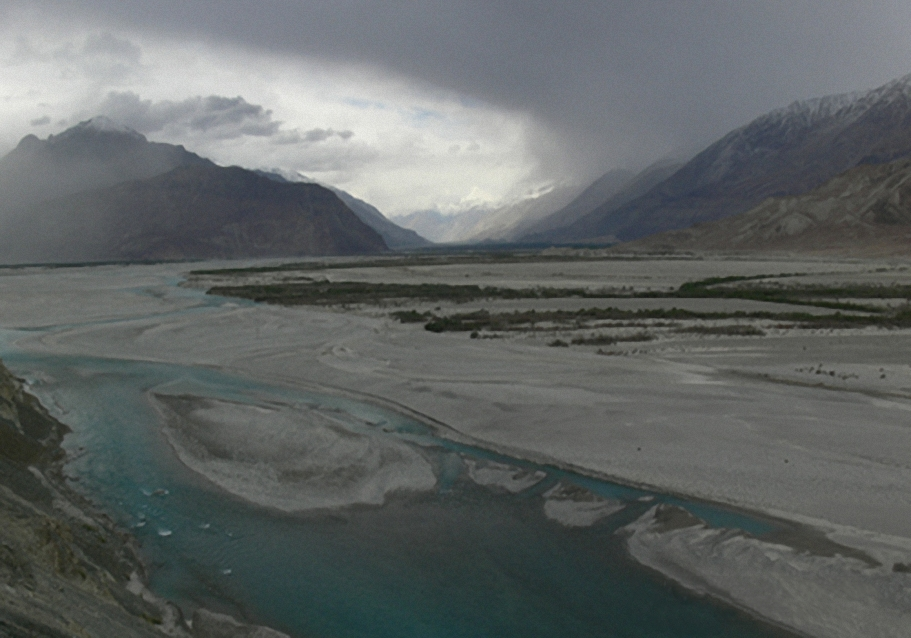
The Shyok Valley near the confluence of the Shyok and Nubra Rivers

From the Nubra confluence to that with the Hushe River, the river flows generally west-northwestward, between the Saltoro Range to the north and the Ladakh Range to the south. Some distance downstream of the Nubra confluence, the valley narrows and, near the hamlet of Yagulung (also known as Changmar), turns into a gorge. Farther downstream, the river crosses from Ladakh, India, into Gilgit-Baltistan, Pakistan. The valley widens and the river becomes braided again shortly before the Hushe confluence. Near the town of Khaplu, it is joined by the Hushe.

From the Hushe confluence to its mouth, where it joins the Indus, the river flows generally westward, between the Masherbrum Range to the north and the Ladakh Range to the south. The mouth is located near the village of Keris, at approximately 35.2286°N 75.9172°E and 2,289 m (7,510 ft) elevation, in eastern Gilgit-Baltistan, Pakistan.

== Tributaries ==
Sketch map showing the Shyok River, its tributaries, and the Indus River

Upstream of its major V-shaped bend, the Shyok has three main tributaries that originate in Aksai Chin and flow into its left bank generally from the east:

- The Chip Chap River rises at the eastern edge of the Depsang Plains, flows around them to the north in a generally westward direction, and joins the Shyok near its source, from the northeast.
- The Galwan River originates in western Aksai Chin, flows generally westward, and merges with the Shyok roughly halfway between its source and its major bend, from the east.
- The Chang Chenmo River rises near the Lanak La pass in Aksai Chin, flows north of the Chang Chenmo Range in a westward direction, and enters the Shyok a little upstream of its major bend, from the east.

Downstream of the major bend, the Shyok has two main tributaries that originate in the eastern and central Karakoram and flow into its right bank generally from the north:

- The Nubra River comes from the Siachen Glacier in the eastern Karakoram and flows south-southeastward between the Saltoro Range to the west and the Rimo Muztagh and Saser Muztagh ranges to the east. It joins the Shyok near the village of Diskit, from the north-northwest.

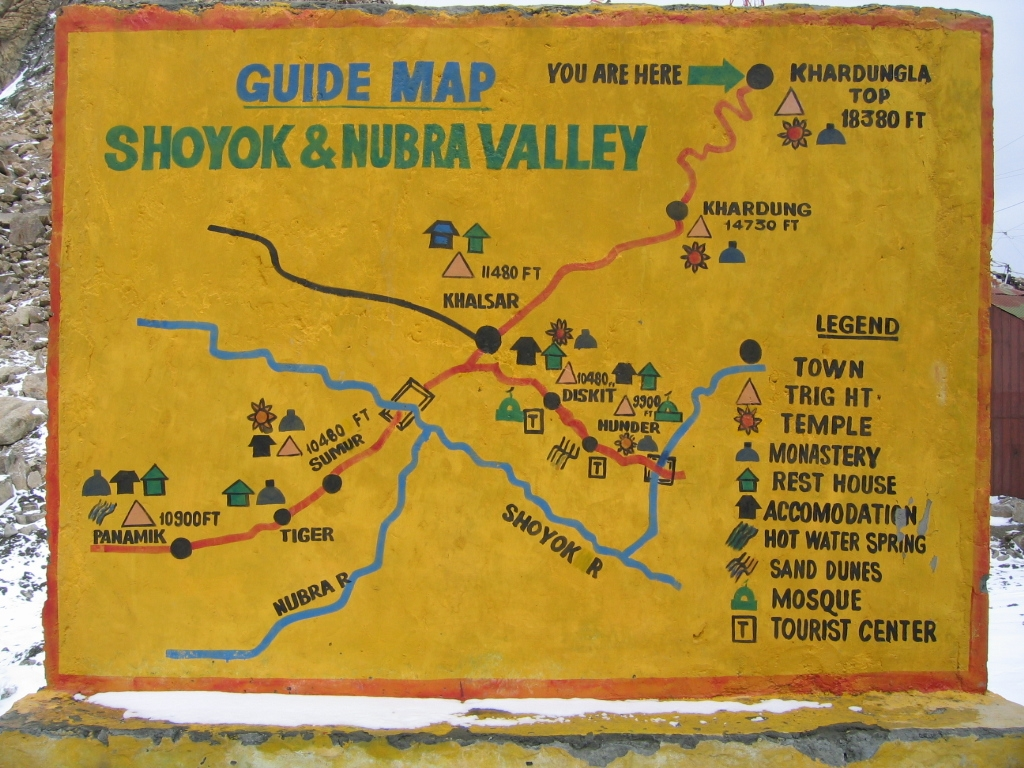
Map-style sign showing points of interest near the confluence of the Shyok and Nubra Rivers

- The Hushe River originates from the Gondogoro Glacier in the central Karakoram, flows generally southward, and enters the Shyok near the town of Khaplu, having been joined shortly before by the Saltoro River.

== Basin and hydrology ==
The Shyok basin primarily drains part of the southern slopes of the central Karakoram, the southern slopes of the eastern Karakoram, part of Aksai Chin, and part of the northern slopes of the Ladakh Range. It covers approximately 33,465 km^{2} (12,921 sq mi), distributed across India (54%), Pakistan (28%) and China (18%).

The Shyok is fed approximately 49% by glacier melt, 39% by snowmelt and 12% by rainfall. Its discharge and sediment transport regime is predominantly glacial and nival, with a peak in summer, during the melt season, and a trough in winter. Over the period 1981–2010, its mean discharge at the Yugo gauging station, near where it joins the Indus River, was 390 m^{3}/s (14,000 cu ft/s), with a minimum of 180 m^{3}/s (6,400 cu ft/s) and a maximum of 546 m^{3}/s (19,300 cu ft/s). Over the same period and at the same station, the suspended sediment concentration showed notable seasonal and interannual variability, ranging from 129 mg/L to 5,220 mg/L.

== Geology ==
The Shyok flows through the collision zone between the Indian and Eurasian plates, a collision that led to the formation of the Himalayas and Karakoram. Its middle course runs along the suture zone between the Ladakh block to the south and the Karakoram block to the north, known as the Shyok Suture Zone. The region is also crossed by the Karakoram fault, a major northwest–southeast-trending strike-slip fault that accommodates part of the India–Eurasia post-collision deformation.

During the Cretaceous (about 143–66 million years ago), the oceanic crust of the Neo-Tethys Ocean, an ancient ocean that separated the Indian and Eurasian plates, subducted beneath Eurasia. This subduction generated the Kohistan–Ladakh volcanic arc. In the Late Cretaceous (about 101–66 million years ago) or Palaeocene (about 66–56 million years ago), the arc and the Karakoram block, on the southern margin of Asia, collided and the intervening basin closed. The Shyok Suture Zone is the scar left by this closure. Since the Miocene (about 23–5 million years ago), part of the deformation resulting from the subsequent India–Eurasia collision has been accommodated by large faults, particularly the Karakoram fault.

The Ladakh block is dominated by the Ladakh batholith, a large body of igneous rock formed by the solidification of magma at depth and composed mainly of granodiorite and granite. The Shyok Suture Zone contains what is called a tectonic mélange, that is, a chaotic mixture formed by tectonic deformation, composed of fragments of the ancient oceanic crust (ophiolites), volcanic rocks and deep-marine sediments. The Karakoram block is dominated by metamorphic rocks, that is, rocks transformed by heat and pressure, particularly gneisses and schists.

The morphology of the Shyok valley results from tectonic activity, Quaternary glaciation and fluvial erosion. The river course is partly controlled by the Karakoram fault and the Shyok Suture Zone. Glaciation has shaped large parts of its valley into a U-shape. The large volumes of sediment supplied by glaciers often give the river a braided pattern, while phases of incision have locally produced fluvial terraces.

== Ecology ==
The Shyok is part of the Upper Indus freshwater ecoregion and flows through the Karakoram–West Tibetan Plateau alpine steppe terrestrial ecoregion, two ecoregions defined by the World Wide Fund for Nature. Its valley has a cold desert to semi-arid climate, with low rainfall and large seasonal temperature variations, and is at high altitude. The river forms a major ecological corridor in the valley and the river corridor concentrates much of the valley's biodiversity.

Along the river corridor, the natural vegetation is generally sparse and mainly controlled by water availability and altitude. It generally becomes more extensive and developed downstream as altitude decreases. In the uppermost reaches of the corridor, near the glaciers, it is extremely sparse. Farther downstream in the upper reaches, patches of grass, scrub and shrubs appear, such as false tamarisk (Myricaria), sea buckthorn (Hippophae rhamnoides) and tamarisk (Tamarix). In the middle reaches, the vegetation bands extend and become denser, with patches of willows (Salix) and poplars (Populus). In the lower reaches, willows and poplars become more frequent.

The fauna of the river corridor is sparse and closely associated with the availability of habitats. The river supports a fish assemblage typical of the high-altitude tributaries of the Indus, notably including snow trout (Schizothorax). Gravel bars serve as breeding and resting sites for certain river birds, notably the ibisbill (Ibidorhyncha struthersii), a species typical of the region's high-altitude braided rivers. The riparian vegetation also provides habitat for some small mammals and passerine birds.

Much of the Indian section of the river lies within or along the boundary of the Karakoram Wildlife Sanctuary, one of India's largest protected areas.

== Valley ==
The Shyok flows through a rocky gorge carved into the Karakoram, with broad semiarid valleys in places that allow limited vegetation and agriculture. The valley floor descends from 4,980 m (16,340 ft) at the snout of the Rimo Glacier to 2,289 m (7,510 ft) at the river's confluence with the Indus at the village of Keris, near Skardu. In its lower reaches, seasonal meltwaters inundate the floodplain, supporting irrigated fruit orchards—apricots, walnuts, apples—and small villages. During winter, the river often freezes solid, providing a natural passage between the Nubra Valley and Khaplu.

== History ==
During the 19th century, the Shyok and its valley became increasingly documented as part of British efforts to map the remote frontier regions of Ladakh and Baltistan. Survey teams from the Survey of India—which conducted extensive frontier surveys following the Treaty of Amritsar (1846)—charted parts of the Shyok and its tributaries. These expeditions laid the groundwork for modern cartographic understanding of the western Himalaya and Karakoram ranges.

The Shyok Valley also held historical significance as a segment of trade and travel routes connecting Leh with Baltistan and western Tibet. Caravans moving between Central Asia and the Indian subcontinent frequently navigated its upper reaches, making use of natural passes and riverine paths. This strategic utility continued into the colonial period, when the British occasionally used these routes for communications and patrols along the mountain frontiers.

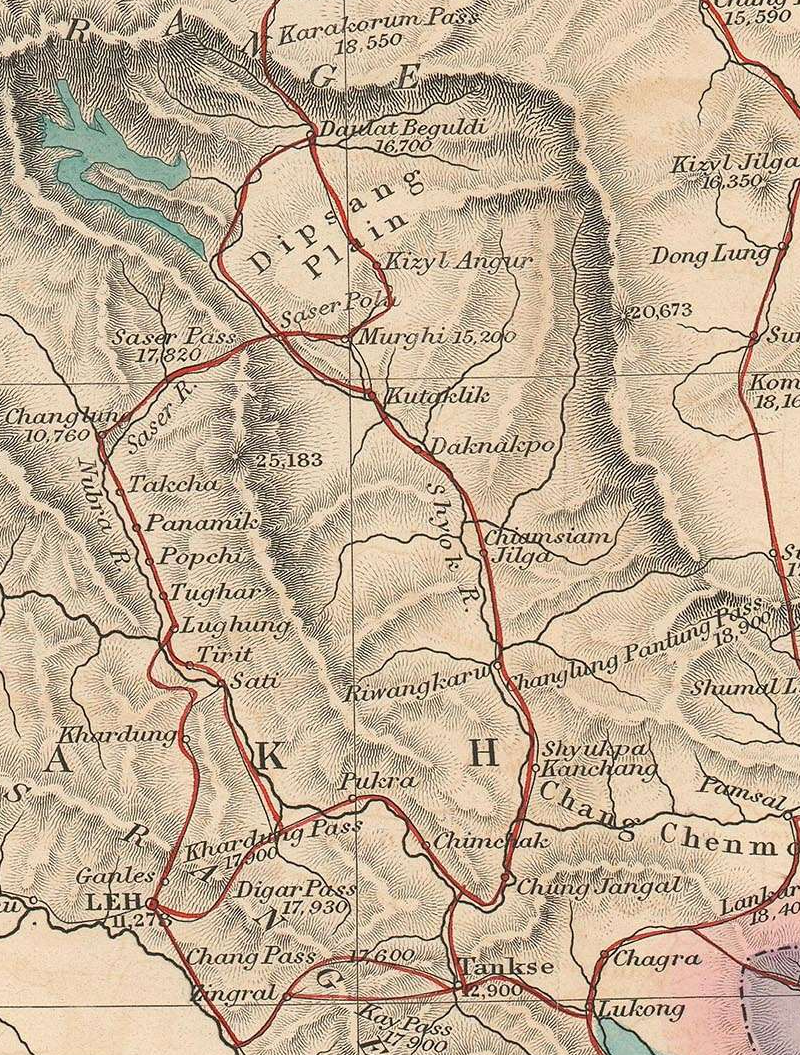
Leh-Yarkand routes through the Shyok and Nubra Valleys on an 1878 British map

In the 20th and 21st centuries, the river has taken on renewed strategic importance due to its proximity to contested border zones—specifically near the Line of Actual Control (LAC) with China and the Line of Control (LoC) with Pakistan. Infrastructure such as the Darbuk–Shyok–Daulat Beg Oldi (DS–DBO) road has been built along the river's banks, enhancing military logistics in the region adjacent to the Siachen Glacier and Aksai Chin.

== Tourism ==
The Shyok Valley provides access to the Nubra Valley, a popular destination in Ladakh. Key attractions along the Shyok include the sand dunes and Bactrian camel rides near the village of Hundar (also spelled Hunder), as well as the Diskit Monastery and its annual Diskit Gustor Festival.

== See also ==
- Geography of Ladakh
- Geography of Gilgit-Baltistan
- List of rivers of India
- List of rivers of Pakistan
- Daulat Beg Oldi
- Khardung La
- Ladakh Range
