= Karakoram Pass =

Mountain pass on the Karakoram Range

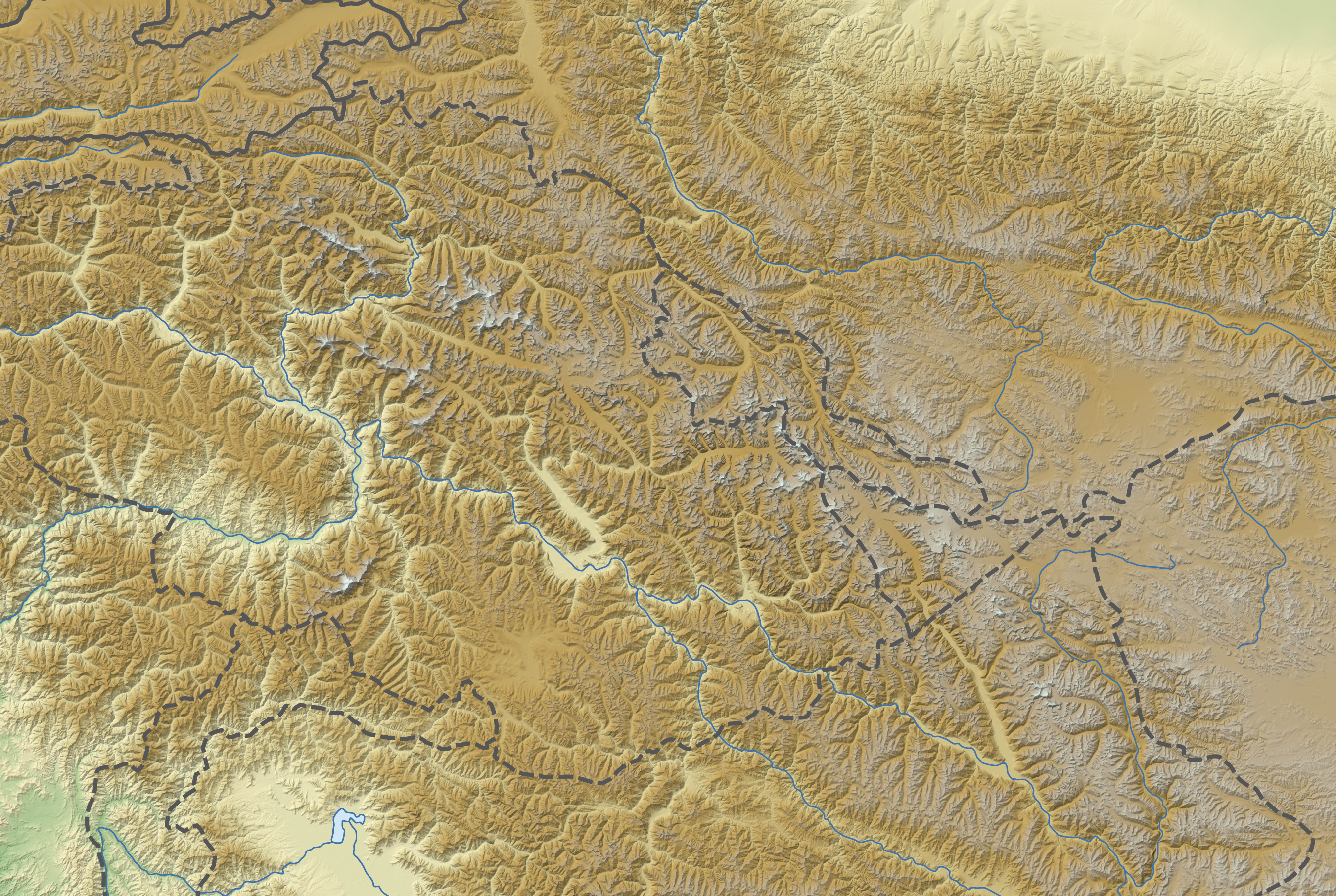
- Location within Karakoram Location within Ladakh Location within India Location within Southern Xinjiang Location within China
- Elevation: 5,540 metres (18,180 ft)
- Traversed by: Robert Shaw (1868); Francis E. Younghusband (1889); Theodore Jr. and Kermit Roosevelt (1926).

Location
- Location: Ladakh, India – Xinjiang, China
- Range: Karakoram Range
- Coordinates: 35.5133°N 77.8231°E

Karakoram Pass

Chinese name
- Traditional Chinese: 喀喇崑崙山口
- Simplified Chinese: 喀喇昆仑山口
Transcriptions
Standard Mandarin
- Hanyu Pinyin: Kālǎkūnlún Shānkǒu

Uyghur name
- Uyghur: قاراقۇرۇم ئېغىزى
Transcriptions
- Latin Yëziqi: Qaraqorom Ëghyzy

Karakoram Pass

The Karakoram Pass (Uyghur: قاراقۇرۇم ئېغىزى) is a 5,540 m or 18,176 ft mountain pass between India and China in the Karakoram Range. It is the highest pass on the ancient caravan route between Leh in Ladakh and Yarkand in the Tarim Basin. The name 'Karakoram' comes from a Turkic language meaning 'Black Gravel'.

Historically, the high altitude of the pass and the lack of fodder were responsible for the deaths of countless pack animals while the route was notorious for the trail of bones strewn along the way. There is an almost total absence of vegetation on the approaches to the pass.

Travelling south from the pass involved three days' march across the barren Depsang Plains at about 5,300 m (17,400 ft). To the north, the country was somewhat less desolate and involved travellers crossing the relatively easy and lower Suget Dawan (or Suget Pass) before reaching the lush grazing grounds around Shahidullah or Xaidulla in the upper valley of the Karakash River.

The pass is in a saddle between two mountains and about 45 metres (148 ft) wide. There is no vegetation or icecap and it is generally free of snow due to the winds. Temperatures are low, there are often very high winds, blizzards are frequent, and the extreme altitude often took its toll. In spite of all this, the Karakoram Pass was considered a relatively easy pass due to the gradual ascent on both sides, and lack of summer snow and ice much of the year. Consequently, the pass was open throughout most of the year. There is no motorable road across the pass, and the pass currently remains closed to all traffic.

== Geopolitical issues ==
The Karakoram pass falls on the boundary between India's union territory of Ladakh and China's Xinjiang autonomous region.

It also plays a major geographic role in the dispute between Pakistan and India over control of the Siachen Glacier area immediately to the southwest of the pass. This area has been under control of India (currently administered as part of the union territory of Ladakh) since 1984. This situation arose from the Simla Agreement, signed in 1972 between India and Pakistan, when the treaty failed to specify the last 100 km (60 mi) or so of the cease-fire line from the end of the Line of Control to the border with China.

A potential China-India-Pakistan tripoint at Karakoram Pass is referenced in a 1963 boundary treaty between China and Pakistan concerning the Trans-Karakoram Tract, but India was not party to that treaty nor any tripoint agreement. The current de facto tripoint is about 100 km west of the pass near Indira Col in the Siachen Muztagh, where the Actual Ground Position Line between Indian and Pakistani forces meets the border with China.

== Historical maps ==
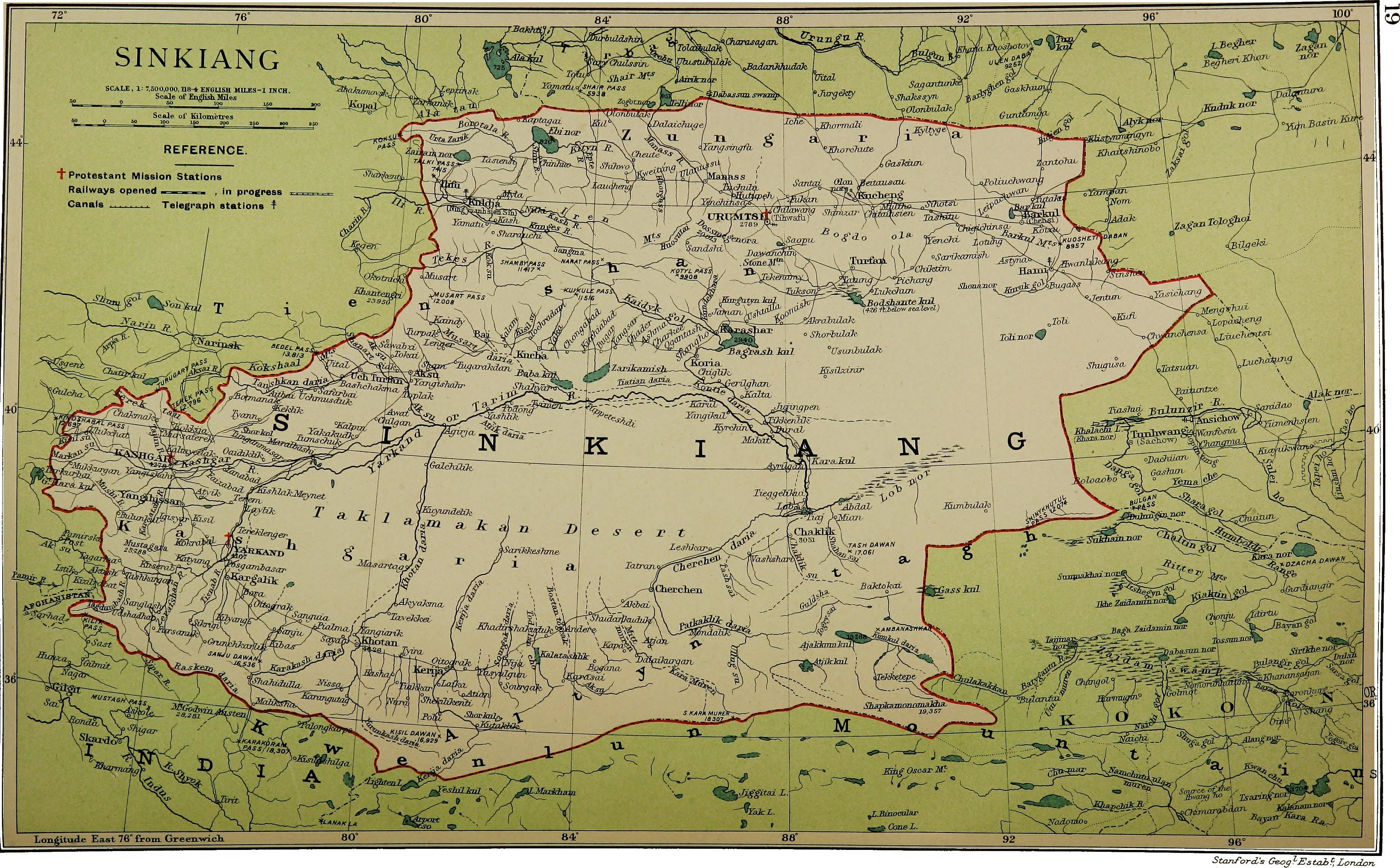
Map including Karakoram Pass (18,307) (1917)

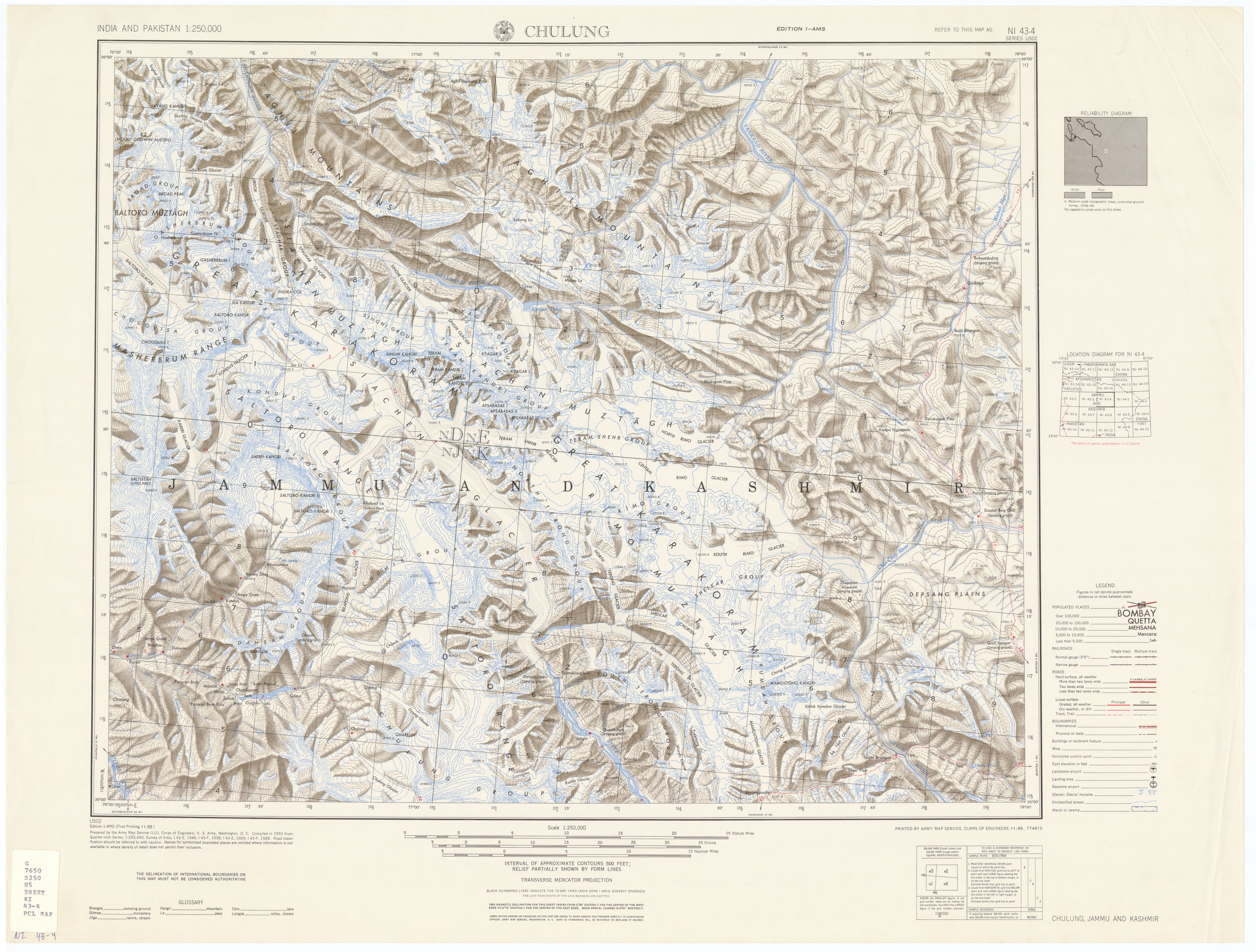
Map including Karakoram Pass (AMS, 1953) (Note: From map: "THE DELINEATION OF INTERNATIONAL BOUNDARIES ON THIS MAP MUST NOT BE CONSIDERED AUTHORITATIVE")

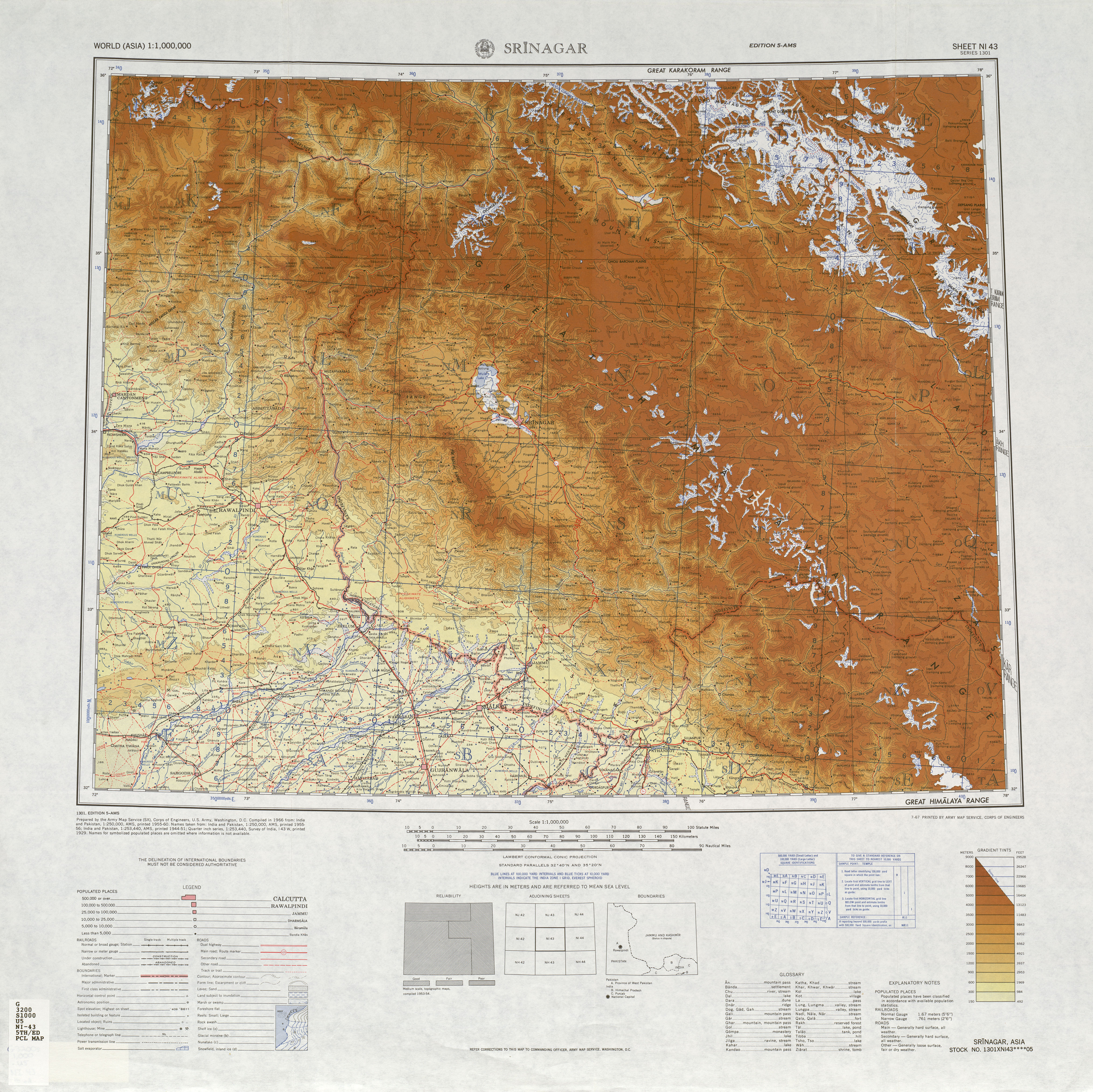
Map including Karakoram Pass (AMS, 1966) (Note: From map: "THE DELINEATION OF INTERNATIONAL BOUNDARIES MUST NOT BE CONSIDERED AUTHORITATIVE")

== See also ==
- Depsang Plains
- Daulat Beg Oldi
- India-China Border Roads
- List of mountain passes of India
- List of locations in Aksai Chin

== Resources ==
- Schmidt, Jeremy. Himalayan Passage: Seven Months in the High country of Tibet, Nepal, China, India & Pakistan. 1991. The Mountaineers Books, Seattle.
