= Rezang La =

China–India border pass in Ladakh

- Rechin La
- Location within Ladakh Location within India
- Elevation: 5,500 m (18,000 ft)

Location
- Location: Leh district, Ladakh, India - Rutog County, Tibet Autonomous Region, China
- Range: Himalaya, Ladakh Range
- Coordinates: 33°25′08″N 78°50′58″E

Rezang La (site of 1962 Sino-Indian War), Rechin La, and Rezang La II, listed west to east, are mountain passes on the watershed ridge which lies east of Indian-administered Chushul Valley in Ladakh and west of Chinese-administered Spanggur Lake basin. China claims that the Line of Actual Control between the two countries passes along the top of this ridge, while India's LAC and border claim lines are further east.

About 3 km southeast of Rechin La (33°24′52″N 78°52′29″E) on the same ridge is a pass leading to an adjacent valley, which China recognizes as Rezang La (Chinese: 热藏山口; pinyin: Rèzàng Shānkǒu) [labelled as the "Rezang La II" in some sources].

About 3 km northwest of Rechin La (33°26′38″N 78°49′48″E) is a pass, [labelled as the "[Old] Rezang La", "Rezang La I" or "Rezang La (1962)" in some sources], that was the site of a major battle of the 1962 Sino-Indian War. The "C" Company of India's 13 Kumaon battalion under Major Shaitan Singh, fought to the last man in an effort to block the Chinese PLA troops from crossing the ridge into the Chushul Valley. Indian sources state 120 Ahir Soldiers killed over 1500 PLA troops out of 3000. The battle was the last event of the Sino-Indian War, as the pass was the Chinese claim line and upon overrunning the ridge, a ceasefire was called.

During the 2020–2021 China–India skirmishes, wider Rezang La area was again the site of conflict between the two nations.

== Geography ==
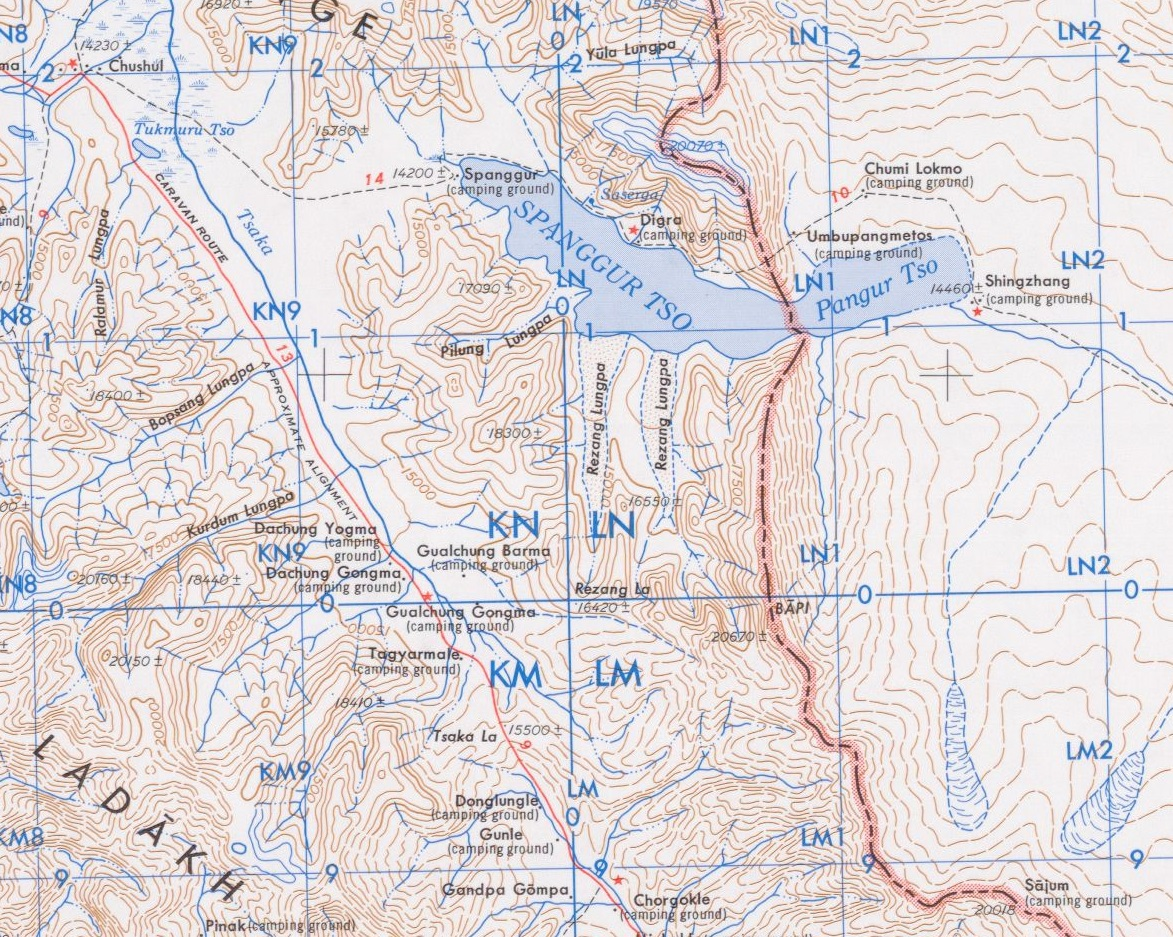
Map-1: Spanggur Lake basin showing Rezang La and two "Rezang Lungpa" streams (AMS, 1954).

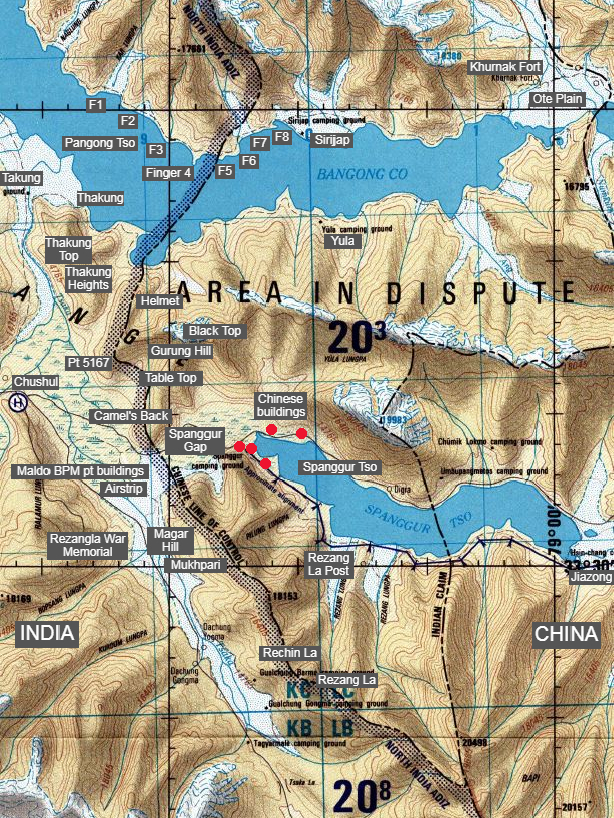
Map-2: Rezang La, Rechin La, and two "Rezang Lungpa" streams leading to the Spanggur Lake.

The watershed ridge (Map-1 and Map-2), a subrange of 60 km long Kailash Range, is located on the LAC, west of Spanggur Tso and east of Chushul Valley. From west to east, has the following features: Spanggur Gap (4,900 m or 16,100 ft), Magar Hill, Mukhpari peak (5,545 m or 18,192 ft), Refan Pass (5,144 m or 16,877 ft), Rezang La (5,005 m or 16,420 ft), Rechin Top (5,204 m or 17,073 ft), Rechin La (5,005 m or 16,420 ft), Rezang La II (5,500 m or 18,045 ft). Refan Pass, Rezang La, and Rechin Top are served by the Indian patrol road from the Gualchung Barma campsite. Rechin La and Rezang La II are served by a separate Indian patrol road from the Tsaka La in the south.

To the north of Rechin La along the LAC are various strategic hill peaks (Map-2), Mukhpari, Magar Hill, and north of Spanggur Gap is the Gurung Hill. To the south of Rezang La is Mount Sajum (6,064 m or 19,895 ft).

The confusion about the "Rezang La" ("Rezang La I" or "Rezang La (1962)") and "Rezang La II" arose due to the old 1954 survey map (Map-1) of region by the American Army, which labeled two adjacent valleys leading to the Spanggur Lake as "Rezang Lungpa". The pass at the head of the western valley (33.4188°N 78.8494°E) at an elevation of 16,420 ft (5,000 m) is labelled "Rezang La". The pass at the head of the eastern valley (33.3888°N 78.9290°E), unlabelled in the survey map [now labelled as the "Rezang La II" in some sources], is at a much higher elevation of 20,670 ft (6,300 m). The streams from these two passes (Map-1 and Map-2), which flow into Spanggur Tso, are both named as "Rezang Lungpa" on the American survey map. In 1963, the Government of India used the name "Rezang La" for pass marked on the American survey map, the one at the head of the western valley. References to "Rezang La" ["Rezang La I" or "Rezang La (1962)"] in the literature on 1962 Sino-Indian War in English language, refer to this pass.

Chinese sources use the name "Rechin La" for another saddle between the western pass ["Rezang La", "Rezang La I" or "Rezang La (1962)"] and eastern pass ["Rezang La II"], which has also been adopted by the Indian news media in 2020.

Rechin La as well as the present Rezang La are mountain passes on the ridge line adjoining the Chushul Valley, which China claims as its border. India's claimed border is further east, and it coincides with the border shown on most British and international maps prior to Indian independence. The Line of Actual Control (LAC) resulting from the 1962 Sino-Indian War coincides with the Chinese claim line in this region. The Chushul village is 27 km northwest of Rezang La.

== Military operations ==
=== 1962 battle of Rezang La ===
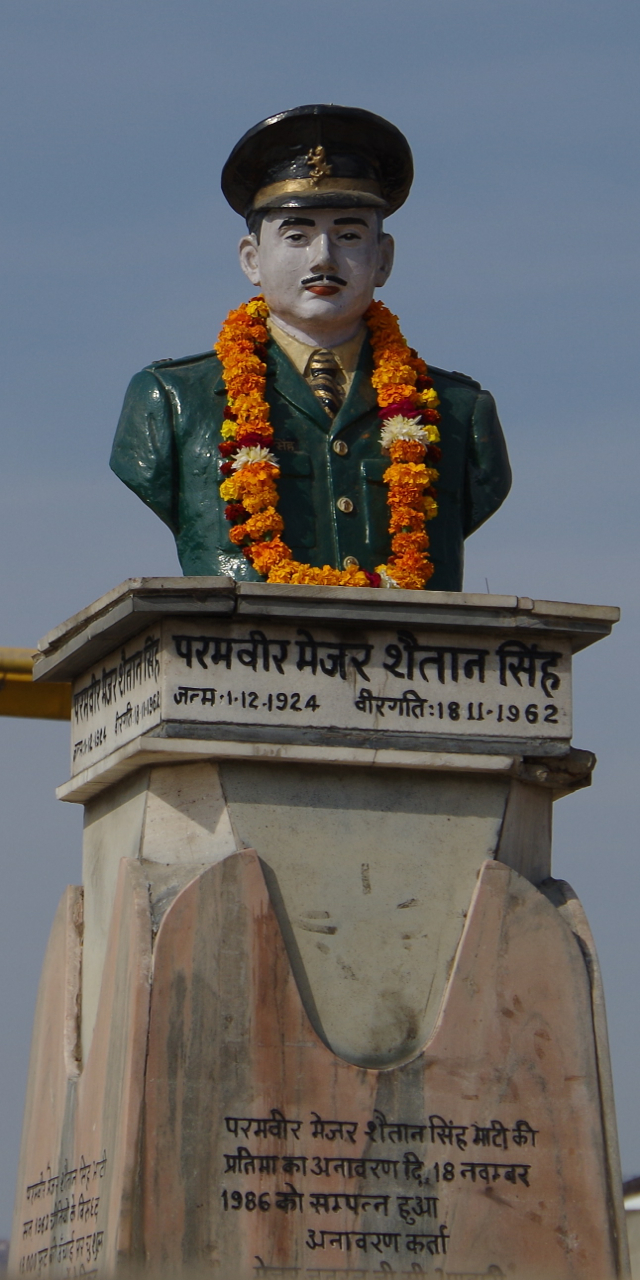
A statue of Major Shaitan Singh in a central square of his native city of Jodhpur, Rajasthan, India.

During the Sino-Indian War in 1962, Rechin La (then called Rezang La) was the site of the last stand of the Charlie "C" company of 13 Kumaon, consisting of 124 Indian soldiers. It was an all-Ahir company. According to the official Indian history of the war, the Rezang La picket of Charlie company was located at an elevation of 5,500 metres (18,000 ft), 11 km south of the Spanggur Gap, on the same ridge line as Rezang La. Rezang La had the drawback that an intervening feature blocked artillery operation, so that the Indian infantry had to do without artillery cover. The Indian side was led by Major Shaitan Singh, who perished in battle and posthumously won India's highest military decoration, the Param Vir Chakra, for his actions.

The Chinese employed human wave tactics, sending up to eight waves against the Indian troop positions. Eventually, the Indian position was overrun, and Indian troops were forced to withdraw to high mountain positions. After the conclusion of battle, their valor was recognized by the Chinese, who had covered the bodies of the Indian soldiers with blankets and even placed bayonets over them so that the makeshift covers do not fly off. This mark of respect is exceptional and atypical of practices of that time.

Both sides took overwhelming casualties, though both countries disagree over how many were killed. It is generally accepted 114 Indian soldiers out of a total of 120 lost their lives. However, Indian sources claim upwards of 1,300 Chinese troops were killed in Rezang La alone, while Chinese sources claim only 722 died in the entire war.

Upon successfully overrunning the mountain and reaching their claim line, the Chinese declared a ceasefire. Indian troops were ordered to withdraw from the area, marking the end of the war in Aksai Chin.

=== 2020 border standoff ===
During the border standoff in the summer, the Indian Army deployed troops along the Line of Actual Control south of the Pangong Tso, including at Rezang La and Rechin La. This was said to give them a commanding view of the Spanggur Gap and China's "Moldo sector" (the deployments around the Spanggur Lake).

== War memorials ==
=== Battlefield tourism ===
Rezang La war memorial is part of the Bharat Ranbhoomi Darshan initiative of the Indian Military which will boost border tourism, patriotism, local infrastructure and economy while reversing civilian outward migration from these remote locations, it entails 77 battleground war memorials in border area including the Longewala War Memorial, Sadhewala War Memorial, Siachen base camp, Kargil, Galwan, Pangong Tso, Doklam, Bum La, Cho La, Kibithu, etc.

=== Rezang La War Memorial ===
The inscription on the War Memorial at Chushul, Ladakh raised by the Indian Army in memory of the soldiers who died in the Battle of Rezang La, reads as below. The first four lines are quoted from Horatius, a poem by Thomas Babington Macaulay, member of the Governor-General of India's Supreme Council from 1834 to 1838

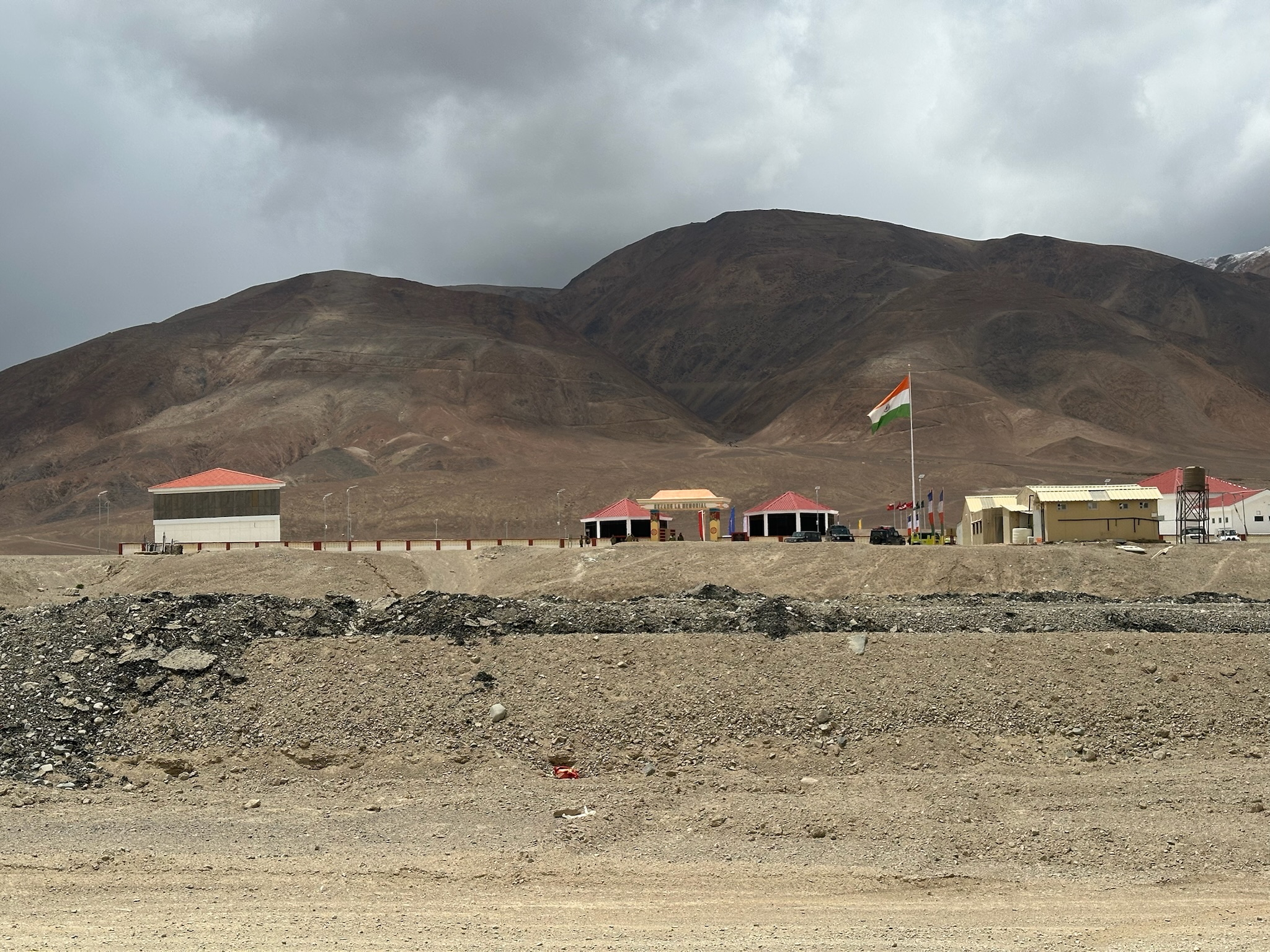
Rezang La war memorial at Ahir Dham, Chushul, Ladakh, India

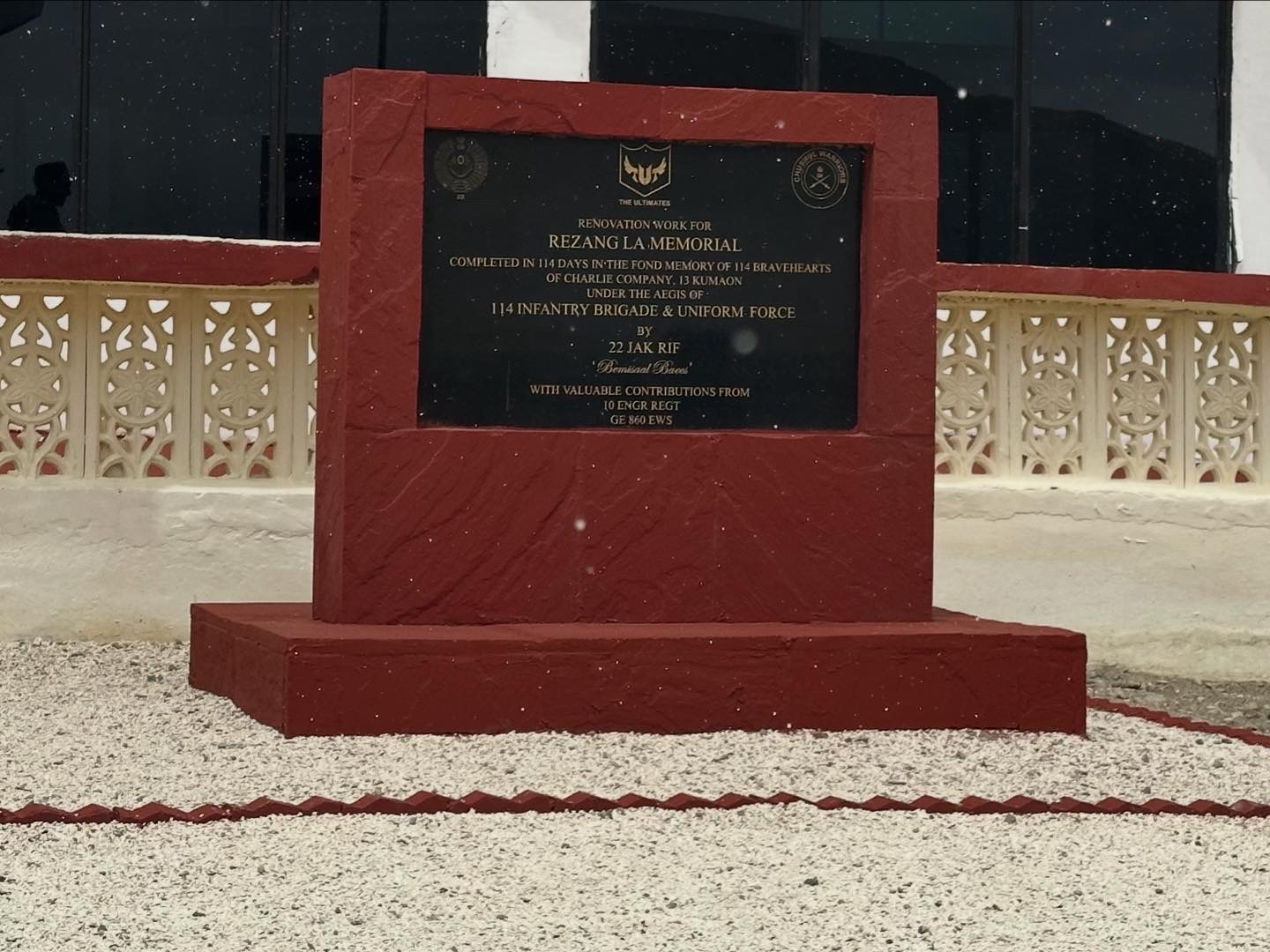
Plaque at the Rezang La war memorial

How can a man die better,
Than facing fearful odds,
For the ashes of his fathers,
And the temples of his gods.
To the sacred memory of
the heroes of Rezang-La
114 martyrs of 13 Kumaon
who fought
to the last man, last round
against hordes of Chinese
on
18 November 1962.
Built by all ranks
13th Battalion the Kumaon Regiment.

Major-General Ian Cardozo writes in his book Param Vir, Our Heroes in Battle:

When Rezang La was later revisited, dead jawans were found in the trenches still holding on to their weapons... every single man of this company was found dead in his trench with several bullets or splinter wounds. The 2-inch mortar man died with a bomb still in his hand. The medical orderly had a syringe and a bandage in his hands when the Chinese bullet hit him... Of the thousand mortar bombs with the defenders, all but seven had been fired, and the rest were ready to be fired when the (mortar) section was overrun.

General T.N. Raina lauded:

You rarely come across such an example in the annals of world military history when braving such heavy odds, the men fought till the last bullet and the last man. Certainly, the Battle of Rezang La is such a shining example.

=== Rezang La War Memorial at Rewari ===
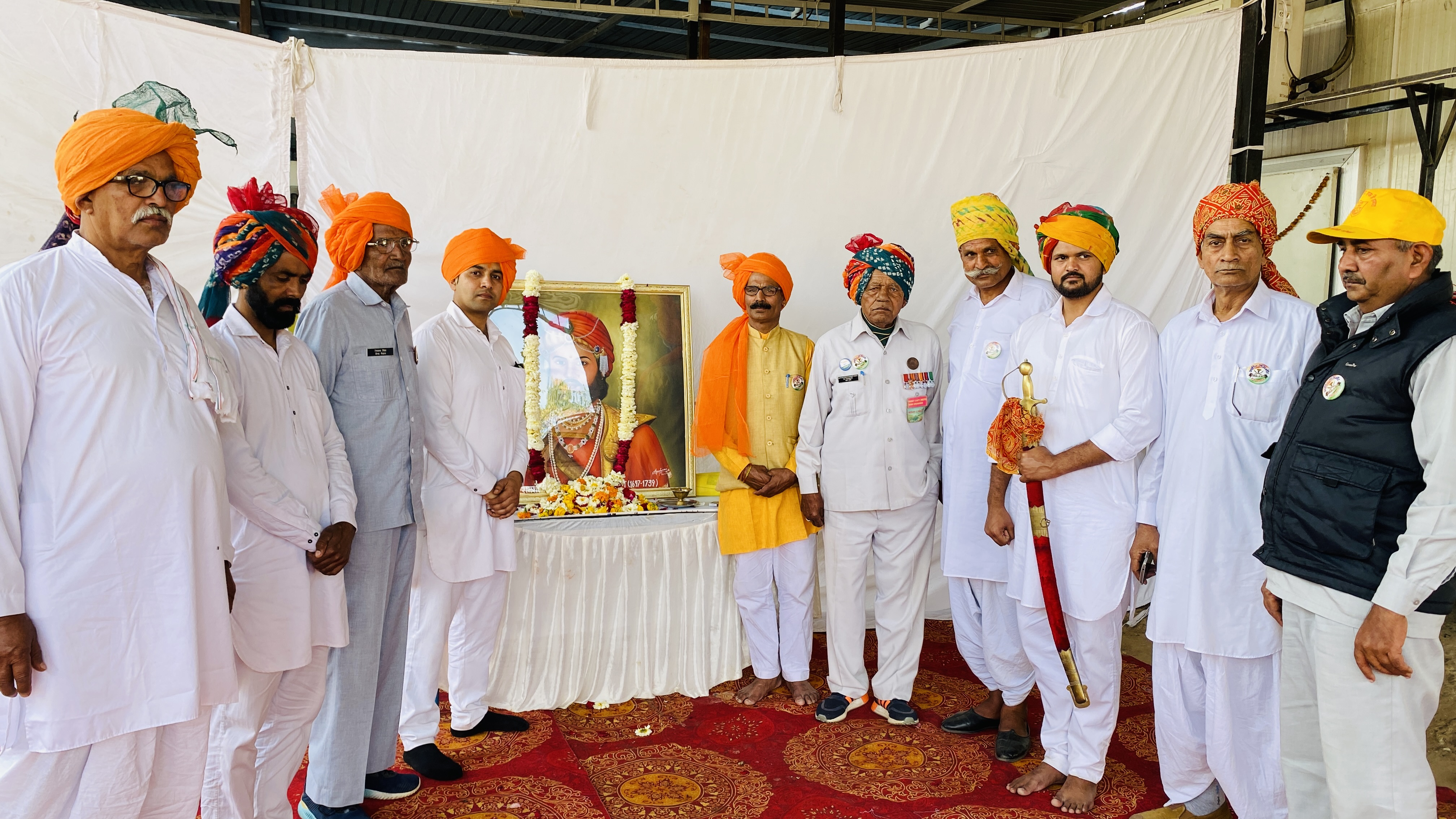

General K S Thimayya wished for a memorial to be built in Haryana in the memory of soldiers who were mostly from this area. He felt generations to come would seek inspiration from the immense courage and valour of their forefathers. Consequently, another Rezang La war memorial was constructed by Rezangla Shaurya Samiti inside Rezang La Park near Dharuhera Chowk in Rewari city. Annual memorial function is held by the Samiti in collaboration with district administration, the Kumaon Regiment and family members of those who died at Rezang La also participate. In every special and cultural event in Delhi-NCR and Rewari, the two "bravest soldiers", Capt. Ram Chander Singh and Hav Nihal Singh, Sena Medal, will be the chief guests as they tell the story of Rajangla. On 24 February 2023, they were the chief guests on Rao Bal Kishan Shaurya Diwas. They also unveiled the portrait of "Rao Bal Kishan".

== Transport ==
National Highway 3 is the closest NH for this location. One can reach to via Loma Bridge/Loma ITBP Check Post and Mahe Bridge. Both were built over the Indus River. Distance is 170 km. It meets to Miru, where proposed Bhanupli–Leh line will connect.

== See also ==
- Border Personnel Meeting point
- India-China Border Roads
- Sino-Indian border dispute
- Gurung Hill
- Shaitan Singh

== Bibliography ==
- Sinha, P.B.; Athale, A.A. (1992), History of the Conflict with China, 1962 (PDF), History Division, Ministry of Defence, Government of India
