= Gurung Hill =

Hill on the border of India and China

- Location within Ladakh Location within Ngari

Highest point
- Elevation: 5,450 metres (17,880 ft)
- Coordinates: 33.611617°N 78.753090°E

Geography
- Location: Aksai Chin

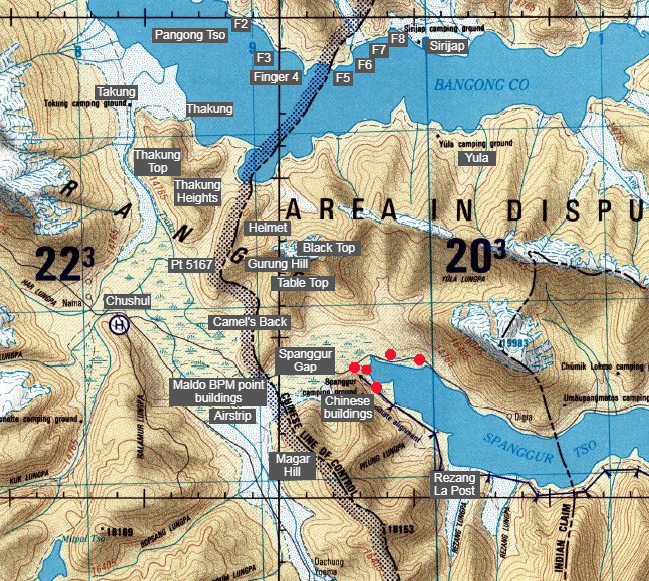
Location of Gurung Hill. Black Top, Table Top, Camel's Back, Yula, Spanggur Gap and Magar Hill visible.

Gurung Hill is a mountain near the Line of Actual Control between the Indian- and Chinese-administered portions of Ladakh near the village of Chushul and the Spanggur Lake. As of 2020, the Line of Actual Control runs on the north–south ridgeline of Gurung Hill. To the west of Gurung lies the Chushul valley (or 'Chushul Bown') and to the right of it are mountains of Kailash Range forming the basins of the Spanggur Lake and the Pangong Lake in this area.

During the 1962 Sino-Indian War, a battle was fought at Gurung Hill, which resulted in a victory for the Chinese forces.

== Geography ==
The Gurung Hill is one of the mountains on the watershed mountain range between the Tsaka Chu river and the Spanggur Lake. The Chinese delegation at the 1960 border talks between China and India claimed this range as China's 'traditional customary boundary', whereas India claimed a boundary further east, cutting across the Spanggur Lake. During the 1962 Sino-Indian War, pitched battles were fought along this range and, in the end, China's claim line was enforced. It is now the Line of Actual Control between the two countries.

Gurung Hill on the north and the Maggar Hill on the south flank a wide gap in the mountains called the Spanggur Gap. The gap leads to the Spanggur Lake in the east and the town of Rutog beyond.

Gurung Hill has an inverted C-shaped ridge line. The southern wing of the ridge which flanks the Spanggur gap has a few relatively flat sections, the lowest of which is referred to as the 'Camel's Back' (Note: Camel's Back coordinate: 33.59°N 78.74°E) by the Indian Army. A middle section of the ridge is termed the 'Table Top' (Chinese: 桌頂) (Note: Table Top (Chinese: 桌頂) coordinate: 33.604°N 78.745°E) and the top of the ridge the 'Bump' (Point 5524.5) (Note: Bump (Point 5524.5) coordinate: 33.6225°N 78.758°E) . The ridge rises from the valley floor at 4,300 metres (14,100 ft) to a height of 5,450 metres (17,880 ft).

A branch of the ridge runs east from the 'Bump' and extends to some miles. It carries a strategic pass termed the 'Quidijiankela Pass' (Note: Quidijiankela Pass (Chinese: 秋迪儉革拉山口) coordinate: 33°37′39″N 78°47′17″E) by the Chinese. In between the 'Bump' and the pass is the highest peak in the region, termed the Black Top by the Indian Army (Chinese: 黑頂; pinyin: Hēi dǐng), (Note: Black Top (Point 5684.6, Chinese: 黑頂; pinyin: Hēi dǐng) coordinate: 33.6225°N 78.7755°E) at an elevation of 5,680 metres (18,640 ft).

The Gurung Hill ends in the north at a peak called 'Point 5167'. (Note: Point 5167 coordinate: 33.6225°N 78.7175°E) The recognised Line of Actual Control runs northeast from here to the middle of the Phursook Bay along a ridge termed 'Helmet'. (Note: Helmet coordinate: 33.645°N 78.726°E)

== History ==
=== Ladakh boundary definition ===
The boundary between Ladakh and Tibet was shaped by a long history of surveys, treaties, and wars. Following the Dogra–Tibetan War of 1841–42, a peace treaty was concluded in September 1842 between the Dogra forces and Tibet that affirmed existing frontiers between Ladakh and the Tibetan plateau. The British defeat of the Sikh Empire in 1846 transferred Ladakh into British Indian sovereignty, and boundary commissioners were deployed with instructions to use watershed limits to draw the new border; however, as historian Kyle Gardner has documented, the complex topography of eastern Ladakh, "a topographical tangle of mountains hundreds of miles wide", made the application of any simple geographical principle impossible, leaving the region without a demarcated border. The first attempt at mapping a northern and eastern boundary came from William Johnson's 1865 survey, which produced a rough line incorporating the Aksai Chin into Ladakh, but Gardner notes Johnson "did not identify water-partings" and much of his sketched boundary proved inaccurate. The maps India inherited at independence in 1947 were, as a result, borderless in much of the eastern Ladakh area.

=== 1962 Battle of Gurung Hill ===
Gurung Hill was at the center of a network of Indian posts at Black Top, Table Top, Camel's Back, Yula, Spanggur Gap and Magar Hill. Neighbouring it to the east is Black Top, which is a continuation of Gurung Hill, and which got its name from its black rocks. The portion of Gurung Hill adjoining Black Top is flat and is called Table Top or Plateau. The rest of the hill is called Camel's Back. To the east of Black Top is the Yula pass, where India had three posts. By 22 October, the Chinese were firing on Yula, and troops were withdrawn from Yula. To the south of Gurung Hill is the Spanggur Gap, and across it, Magar Hill, both of which were held by India. Chinese troops attacked Gurung Hill and Magar Hill, and conquered Plateau on 18 November 1962 and Camel's Back the next day. The forces at Magar Hill were withdrawn on the night of 19 November.

=== 2020 border standoff ===
During the border standoff in summer–autumn 2020, the Indian Army said that the PLA made provocative military moves in the Chushul sector and it moved to preempt them. On the night of 29/30 it occupied several heights around the Chinese-administered area, including the Gurung Hill. It was also reported that around 100 Chinese soldiers were seen below the 'Black Top' hill. However, no physical clash was reported and the Indian Army repositioned its troops in the area as a precaution to prevent any future intrusion by the PLA. There were sporadic media reports of the Indian Army also taking control of the Black Top hill but these were denied by the Indian government sources.

== See also ==
- Phursook Bay

== Bibliography ==
- Cheema, Brig Amar (2015), The Crimson Chinar: The Kashmir Conflict: A Politico Military Perspective, Lancer Publishers, pp. 51–, ISBN 978-81-7062-301-4
- Malhotra, A. (2003), Trishul: Ladakh and Kargil 1947-1993, Lancer Publishers, ISBN 978-81-7062-296-3
