= Border Personnel Meeting Point =

India-China army consultation locations

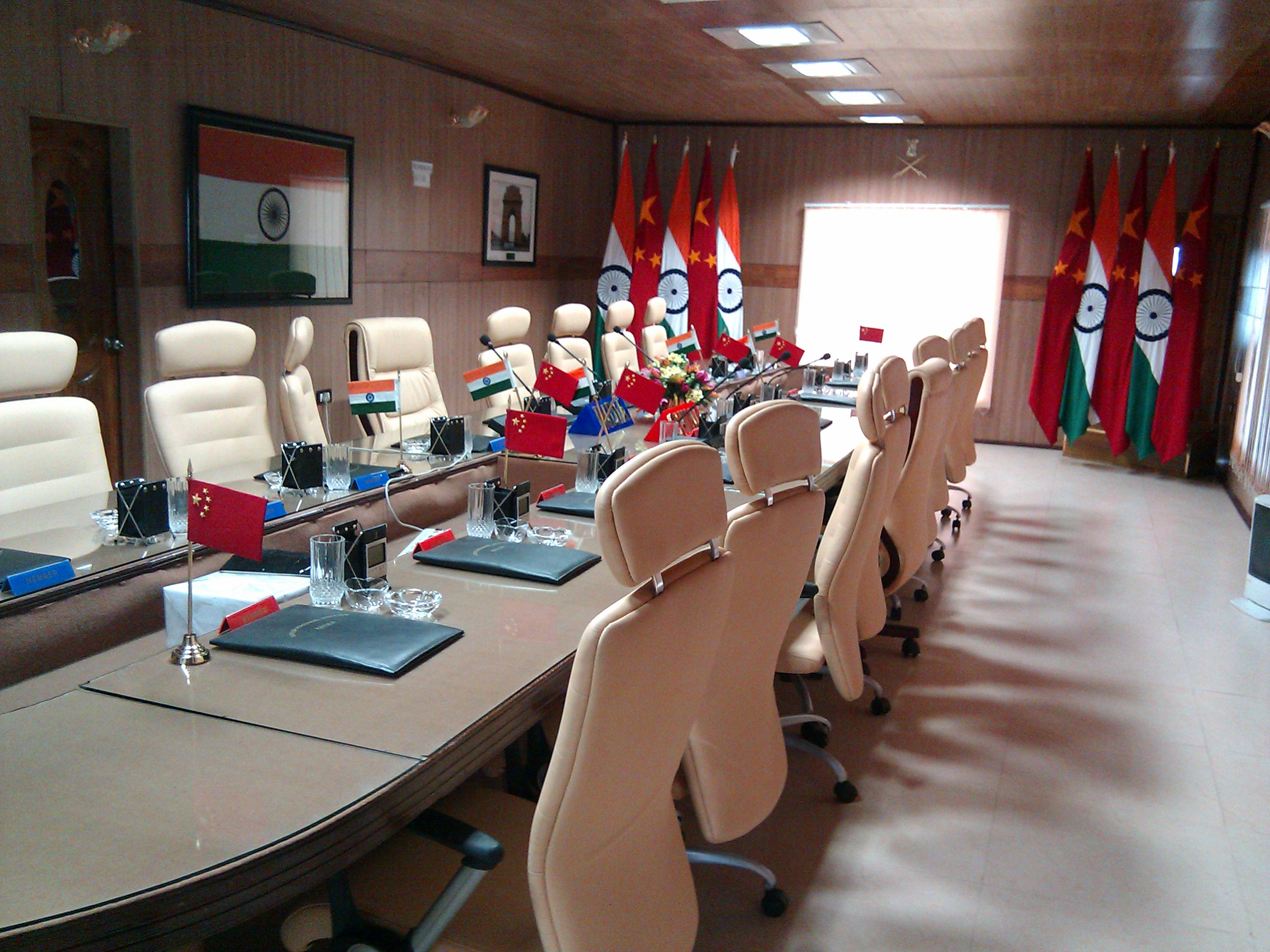
The Indo-China Conference hall at Nathu La

Border Personnel Meeting Points are locations along the disputed Sino-Indian territories on the Line of Actual Control (LAC) where the armies of both countries hold ceremonial and practical meetings to resolve border issues and improve relations. While border meetings have been held since the 1990s, the first formal Border Personnel Meeting point was established in 2013. There are five meeting points: two in the Indian Union Territory of Ladakh, one in Sikkim, and two in Arunachal Pradesh in India's Central and Eastern sectors.

India has identified the specific Patrol Points with the specified route and the maximum depth up to which Indian troops usually patrol into the disputed territory on LAC. Patrolling points provide a truer sense of the extent of India's limits of actual control.

== History ==
Map showing disputed territories of India

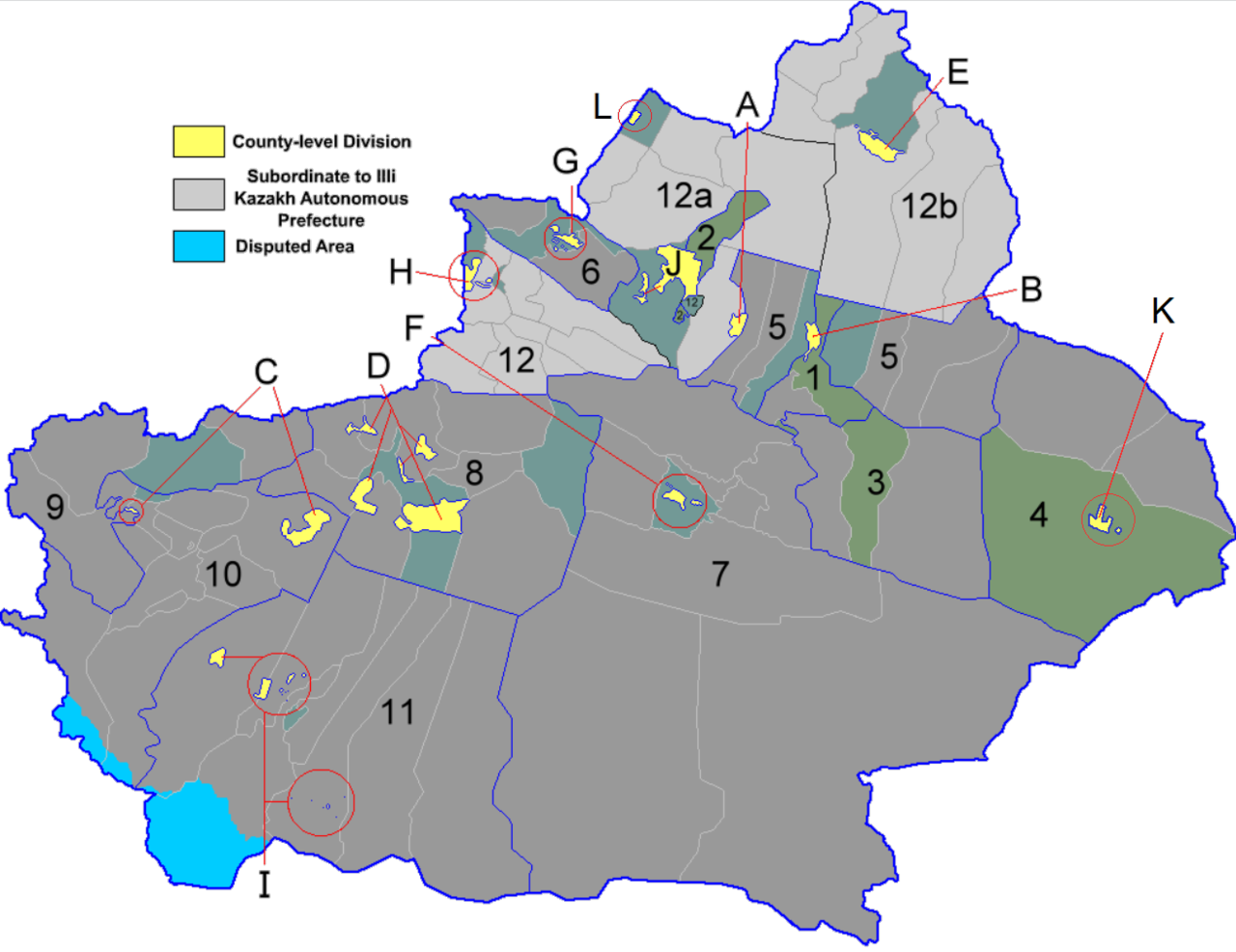
Map of Xinjiang Uyghur Autonomous Region with disputed areas shown in blue

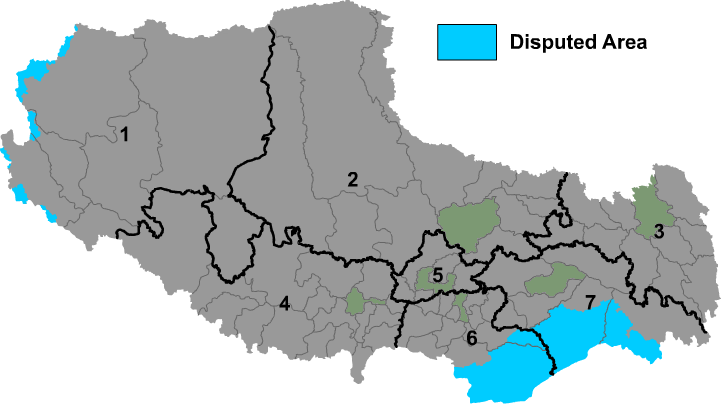
Map of Tibet Autonomous Region with disputed areas shown in blue

The border between China and India is 3,488 kilometres (2,167 mi) in length and often in sparsely populated areas. Its exact location has never been formally defined and is thus vague and in dispute. Both governments patrol up to where they each believe the border lies. Indian and China began discussing the border in the 1980s.

One aspect of an initiative of Indian Prime Minister Narendra Modi to improve Indo-Chinese relations and reduce border tension was the creation of formal locations to hold Border Personnel Meetings. Border Personnel Meeting points were established after the signing of a Border Defense Cooperation Agreement in October 2013. The first three formal BPM Points were opened shortly after the agreement. Two additional locations were opened in 2015.

Sino-Indian dispute is seen as the territory slicing aspect, one of many components, of China's salami slice strategy.

== BPM usage and types ==
To facilitate cooperation and peace at the disputed border through consultation and interaction, the armies of both countries, the Indian Army and China's People's Liberation Army (PLA), hold meetings near the border called Border Personnel Meetings (BPMs). These meeting have been held since 1995. Formal meeting points are at fixed locations and have infrastructure. Before they were used, meetings were not in permanent locations and could have been on either the Indian or Chinese side of the Line of Actual Control (LAC).

There are two types of BPMs. A ceremonial BPM is used for cultural exchange to build friendship and otherwise improve to bilateral defense relations between the two armies. Ceremonial BPMs have been held on New Year's Day (January 1), India's Republic Day (January 26), Harvest Festival (April 14), May 15, PLA Day, which commemorates the establishment of the Chinese PLA (August 1), and Indian Independence Day (August 15). These meetings include the playing of each country's national anthem and saluting of their respective flags, and ceremonial addresses by representative of both armies.

A BPM Flag Meeting is a meeting between the armies "used to resolve local issues like patrols inadvertently crossing over and prevents flare-ups".

== Summary of BPM point locations ==
BPM points at mountain passes along the border, from west to east, are:

Location NW to SE
BPM point (pass and sector)	Indian State/UT	Chinese Prefecture (within Tibet Autonomous Region)	Formal Opening Date	Prior First Use	Details
DBO-TWD	Ladakh	Ngari Prefecture	Aug 2015	Unknown	Karakoram Pass is also in this area.
Spanggur Gap (Chushul-Moldo)	Ladakh	Ngari Prefecture	2013–2014	Unknown	Moldo (Chinese: 莫爾多) post of the Indian Army, coordinates 33.5575°N 78.732°E. Spanggur (Chinese: 斯潘古爾) post of the People's Liberation Army of China, coordinate: 33.566°N 78.591°E. This is near the Rezang La.
Nathu La	Sikkim	Shigatse	2013–2014	<2006	
Bum La Pass (Tawang)	Arunachal Pradesh	Nyingchi	2013–2014	<2006	
Kibithu (Walong)	Arunachal Pradesh	Nyingchi	May 2015	Nov 2006	India's last village and border post on LAC is at Kaho pass/village.

== Details of BPM point locations ==
=== Spanggur or Chushul-Moldo ===
The Spanggur Meeting Point at Spanggur Gap, is also known as Chushul-Moldo Meeting Point, has a meeting hut there. The meeting point and a nearby 1962 Sino-Indian War memorial are tourist attractions. Chushul, 10 km east of meeting point at Spanggur Gap, is in the Leh district of the Indian state of Ladakh region.

=== Nathu La ===
Nathu La is a mountain pass in the Indian state of Sikkim and once part of the historic Silk Road. It is also one of three open trading border posts between China and India. Along with Bum La Pass, it was one of the first two informal locations used in the first decade of BPMs.

=== Bum La Pass ===
Bum La Pass is a mountain pass in the Tawang district of the Indian state Arunachal Pradesh, 42 kilometres (26 mi) north of the town of Tawang at an altitude of 15,134 feet (4,613 m). Fierce fighting took place there during the 1962 border war when China invaded India through the pass.

Ceremonial meetings were held there every year on August 15 (Indian Independence Day) from 2006 to 2016. The Chinese did not participate in 2017 due to a border standoff in Doklam. Both armies resumed meeting on October 30, their first since the conflict ended on August 28. Along with Nathu La, it was one of the first two informal locations used in the first decade of BPMs.

=== Kibithu ===
Kibithu is in the Anjaw District of the Indian State of Arunachal Pradesh and opened in May 2015. The first meeting there between the Indian and Chinese military occurred in conjunction with Prime Minister Modi's China visit of May 14–16. At this meeting, Modi and Chinese Premier Li Keqiang agreed to open additional meeting points to improve bilateral defense relations. The first BPM was held here in 2006, well before the location was formalized as a meeting point. That meeting coincided with the first visit to India by Chinese President Hu Jintao and at the time was the third "informal" meeting point. The exact meeting point is at Kaho pass on LAC, which is India's last village and pass, there is ITBP post north of Kaho. The Kaho village itself is north of Kibithu and Walong AGL base. All of these are on the bank of Lohit River, a left bank tributary of Brahmaputra, which flows north to south from China to India.

=== Daulat Beg Oldi - Tianwendian ===
Daulat Beg Oldi is in the Ladakh region and opened in 2015. Tianwendian, a Chinese military camp is on the Chinese side near Depsang Plains in the region of Aksai Chin, an area controlled by China but claimed by India. It is the highest meeting point.

The first meeting at this location was held on 1 August 2015 (PLA Day). The events included a Chinese cultural program and other ceremonies meant to improve relations. Later in the month, India hosted a delegation from the PLA on the occasion of Indian Independence Day and celebrated with traditional songs and dances from Indian culture, Gatka martial arts, and motorcycle acrobatics performed by the Indian Army Corps of Signals. The first ceremonial BPM ever held on New Year's Day was here in 2016.

A meeting hut was constructed approximately a year after the meeting point was opened.

The meeting point is at an especially sensitive location as it was the region of many Chinese incursions. The meeting point is at an elevation of 16,000 feet (4,900 m) and hosts one of the highest airstrips in the world. It is the northernmost meeting point. A three-week long confrontation occurred here in 2013 when China objected to Indian fortifications at Chumur. The airstrip was unused from the 1965 India-Pakistan war until 2008 when India sought to show its ability to respond to threats in the remote region and landed an Antonov-32 transport plane there. Five years later, India sent another transport, a C-130J Super Hercules to the base. India considers this location strategically important as a point from which to control the Karakoram Highway between Gilgit-Baltistan, Pakistan and China's Xinjiang Uyghur Autonomous Region. Such control would be important in the event of a war between India and China.

=== Proposed meeting points ===
In 2014, establishment of a meeting point at Lipulekh Pass in Uttarakhand, 35 kilometres (22 mi) from the Chinese town of Burang, close to Changla was discussed.

In April 2016, discussions began on creating a meeting point in middle sector of the border, possibly in the Himachal Pradesh (either Kaurik or Shipki La) - Uttarakhand (either Pulam Sumda or Barahoti) region on the Indian side in a site logistically convenient for both sides. Discussions occurred in Beijing between Indian defense minister Manohar Parrikar and Chinese military and civilian leadership.

=== BOM points map ===
Border Personnel Meeting points
(locations in China in red, locations on LAC in yellow, locations in India in green, proposed/discussed expressed in blue) Borders present/absent as per OSM editors.

== See also ==
- India-China Border Roads
- Line of Actual Control
- Line of Control
- McMahon Line
- Sino-Indian border dispute
- Sino-Indian relations
