= Pangong =

Pangong may refer to:

- Pangong Lake, endorheic lake in India and China
- Pangong range, mountain range in Ladakh, India
