= Kangju Kangri =

Mountain in India

- Thinguru
- Location within Ladakh

Highest point
- Elevation: 6,725 m (22,064 ft)
- Prominence: 2,147 m (7,044 ft)
- Listing: Ultra
- Coordinates: 33°43′24″N 78°31′42″E

Geography
- Location: Ladakh, India
- Parent range: Pangong range, Karakoram

Kangju Kangri is a mountain in the Karakoram Range of Asia located in the union territory of Ladakh, India. With a summit elevation of 6,725 meters above sea level, it is the highest peak of the Pangong range, a subrange of the Karakoram. Kangju Kangri rises over the winding, tri-headed Kangju glacier and Pangong Lake to the east.

== See also ==
- List of Ultras of Tibet, East Asia and neighbouring areas
