= Chushul =

Settlement in Ladakh, India

- Town
- Location in Ladakh, India Chushul (India)
- Coordinates: 33.601°N 78.648°E
- Country: India
- Union Territory: Ladakh
- District: Changthang
- Tehsil: Tangtse
- Elevation: 4,350 m (14,270 ft)

Population (2011)
  - Total: 949
- Time zone: UTC+5:30 (IST)
- Census code: 908

Chushul (Alternative spellings include Chhushul, Chushal, Chushol, and Chusul. An old spelling is Shushal, also Shooshal.) is a town in Tangtse tehsil in the Changthang district of Ladakh, India. It is located in the area known as "Chushul Valley", south of the Pangong Lake and west of the Spanggur Lake. The Line of Actual Control with China runs about 5 miles (8 km) east of Chushul, across the Chushul Valley. Famous as site for historical battle grounds.

== Geography ==
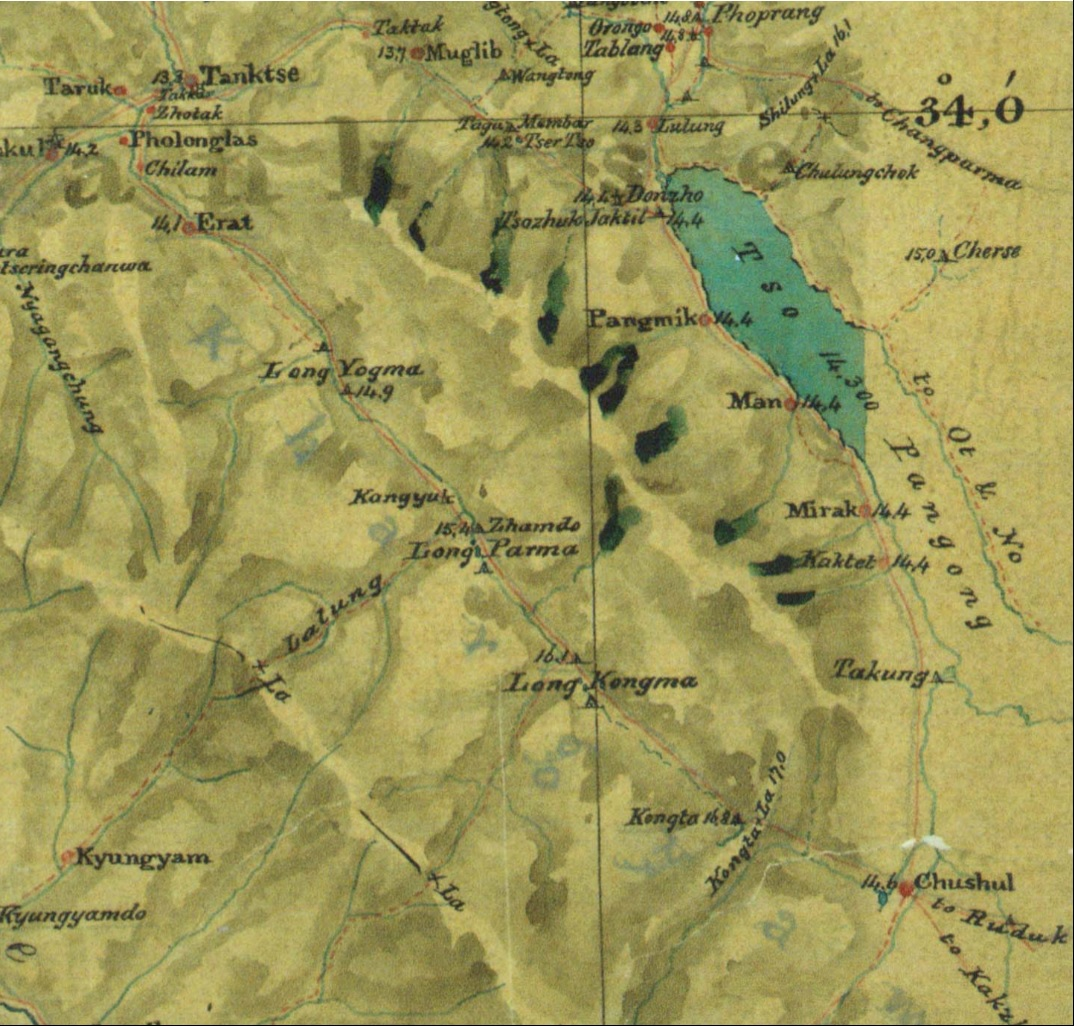
Map 1: Chushul, Tangtse and the Loi Yogma valley (Strachey, 1851)

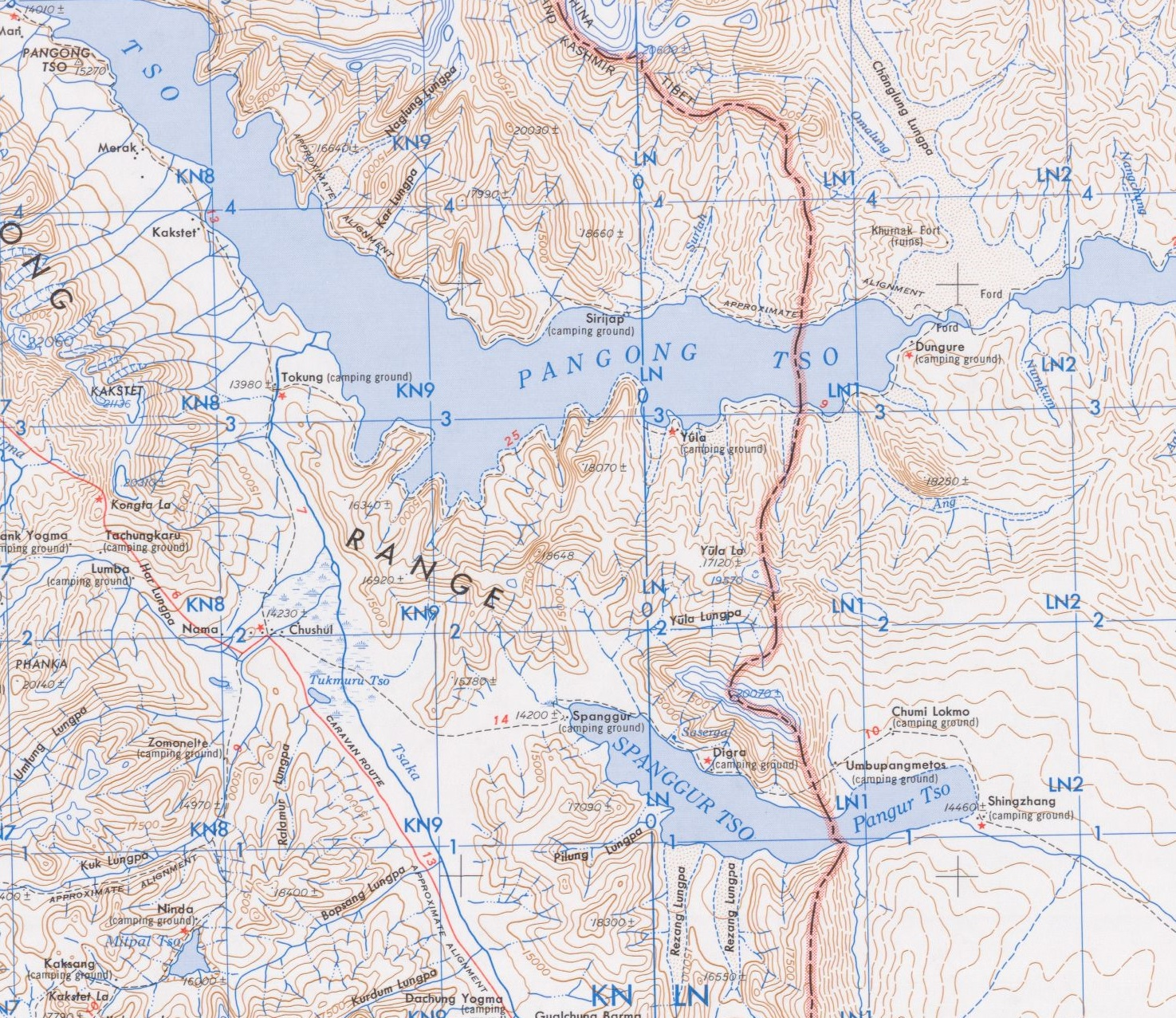
Map 2: Area around Chushul (AMS, 1954) (Note: From map: "THE DELINEATION OF INTERNATIONAL BOUNDARIES ON THIS MAP MUST NOT BE CONSIDERED AUTHORITATIVE")

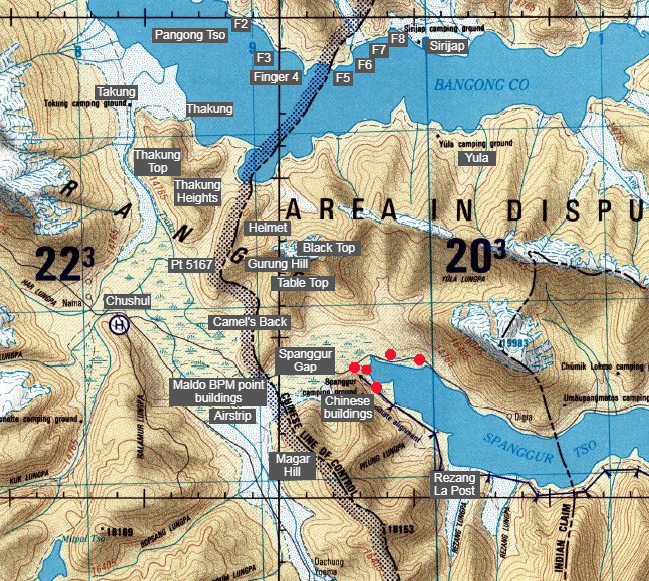
Map 3: Chushul area (DMA, 1992)

Chushul lies at the confluence of 3 streams, Tsaka Chu (flows from south of Chushul), Har Lungpa (flows from northwest of Chushul) and Umlung Lungpa (flows from southwest of Chushul). Key passes near Chushule are Tsaka La in the south on Shushule-Dungti route, Kongta La northwest of Chushul on Chushul-Tansgte route, and Spanggur Gap to the southwest of Chushule on Chushule-Spanggur Tso route. Chushule is 16 km south of Pangong Lake and 20 km northwest of Spanggur Tso. Important mountain ranges nearby are Pangong Range (between Chushul and Tangtse to the east-northeast of Chushule), Kailash Range (Map 3, east of Chushul and east of Tsaka Chu river), and Ladakh Range (west of Chushul between Leh-Chushul-Nyoma).

Tsaka Chu (also called Chushul stream), rises nealry 30 km south of Chushul near the Tsaka La pass and flows north for about 30 miles before entering the Pangong Lake on its south bank near Thakung, flows through a flat Tsaka Plain of Tsaka Chu valley some 10 square miles (16 sqkm) in extent, allowing for scattered growth of grass and fuelwood, along which lies Chushul. Chushul is about 10 miles (16 km) south of the Pangong Lake.

Har Lungpa, west-to-east flowing river flows down from Loi Yogma peak, past Kongta La (also called Chushul La or Chushul Pass) on Chushul-Tansgte route, to Chushul. The valley of Har Lungpa is also sometimes called Loi Yogma valley. Chushul, at the mouth of the Loi Yogma valley, itself is on the western edge of the Tsaka Chu plain which lies north of Tsaka La pass. The Loi Yogma valley, immediately to the west of Pangong Range, provides the travel route to Tangtse and the central parts of Ladakh beyond it. This valley was also the site of the "Battle of Chushul" fought as part of Dogra–Tibetan War in 1842.

Umlung Lungpa, another west-to-east flowing stream flows to Chushul from the southwest of Chushul. These two streams confluence with south-to-north flowing Tsaka Chu near Chushul.

Bopsang Lungpa tributary of Tsaka Chu, flows 14 km southwest to northeast, and has an ITBP post.

A narrow range of mountains called Pangong Range lies between Chushul and the village of Tangtse to the northwest. (Map 1) Across the Tsaka Chu valley to the east of Chushul is a range of mountains that are considered part of the Kailash Range. (Map 3) The Line of Actual Control between India and China runs along this range, even though India's claim line is 20 km to the east of it. (Map 2) About 15 km southeast of Chushul, a gap in the Kailash range leads to another valley that contains the Spanggur Lake and continues to Rutog a hundred kilometers away.

== History ==
Being a border village, Chushul has had a rich history involvement in engagements and conflicts between India and China.

=== 1842: Dogra–Tibetan war ===
In August 1842 the concluding battle of the Dogra–Tibetan war with subsequent signing of the Treaty of Chushul in September 1842 for border non-proliferation took place at Chushul.

=== 1947–1948: Indo-Pakistani War ===
During the Indo-Pakistani War of 1947–1948, an airstrip was built at Leh and a motorable road was constructed up to Kargil. From Kargil onwards into Ladakh, only animal transport was possible.

=== 1951: Chinese annexation of Tibet ===
In 1951, soon after the Chinese annexation of Tibet, a situation developed near Chushul with a brigade of Kazakh troops from Chinese Central Asia trying to flee via Rudok, and the Chinese PLA pursuing them. Indian intelligence detected the movements in advance, and arrangements were made to rush a company of Indian troops from Pattan to Chushul, traveling by road and animal transport. The Kazakhs fled through the Spanggur Valley and set up defensive posts 3 km east of the then prevailing border (India's claim line). Fighting erupted between them and the PLA troops pursuing them. After discussion, Indian prime minister Jawaharlal Nehru agreed to grant asylum to the fleeing Kazakhs, and they were admitted into India. Indian troops stood their ground and confronted the PLA troops, who eventually withdrew.

After the incident, it was decided to lay an airstrip near Chushul for defensive deployments. An initial location was selected east of Spanggur Gap in territory currently under Chinese control. However, it was considered unsuitable and a second location was selected within the Tsaka Chu valley, opposite the Spanggur Gap. The airstrip was completed by August 1952. Jawaharlal Nehru along with colleagues took the first flight into it and inaugurated it.

=== 1962: Sino-Indian War ===
A road link to Chushul became available only in September 1962. In 1960, the Border Roads Organisation (BRO) was set up by Government of India to take over the construction of strategic border roads. The BRO completed the road to Leh by August 1962 (now NH-1), and extended it up to Chushul by September 1962. Until this time, the Chushul airstrip was the only means available for logistics. Dakotas and Ilyushin Il-14 planes from No. 12, 42 and 43 squadrons of Indian Air Force made logistical supply flights to Chushul. The Army asked for six AMX-13 tanks to be airlifted for defence of Chushul. AN-12 transport airplanes were used for the purpose, after making elaborate arrangements for the transport of delicate but heavy equipment, and they were eventually delivered on 25 and 26 October 1962. Flight Lieutenant Virendera Singh Pathania of No. 23 Squadron IAF made sorties from Chushul for photo reconnaissance on a Gnat airplane.

On 18 November 1962 Sino-Indian War, PVC Major Shaitan Singh with his five platoons of 120 men fought to the 'last man, last round' at Rezang La (Chushul), only 6 men survived the Chinese massacre. During the 1962 Sino-Indian War, the 114 Infantry Brigade was headquartered at Chushul, and it had the control of all the forward deployments from Daulat Beg Oldi (DBO) in the north to Demchok in the south. The units involved were 14 J&K Militia in the DBO sector, 5 Jat in the Galwan and Changchenmo sector, 1/8 Gorkha Rifles in the Chushul sector (holding Spanggur Gap and the surrounding areas), 13 Kumaon holding features to the south of Spanggur Gab and 1 J&K Militia holding the rest of the areas up to Demchok. The Ahir regiment of 13 Kumaon stationed at the Rezang La pass (as it was then called) fought the famous last stand battle.

=== Present day: Border Personnel Meeting point ===
Chushul Border Personnel Meeting point (BOP), also called the Moldo-Spanggur BOP, is one of the five officially agreed BOPs between the Indian Army and the People's Liberation Army of China for regular consultations and interactions between the two armies to improve relations. Location of respective military posts nearest to the Chushul BOP are:

- Moldo (Chinese: 莫爾多) post of the Indian Army, coordinate: 33.5575°N 78.732°E
- Spanggur (Chinese: 斯潘古爾) post of the People's Liberation Army of China, coordinate: 33.565°N 78.80°E

The 315 Field Workshop Company is being established over an area of 3.7 ha (37,000 m^{2}) at Chushul to support the deployment of 142 Infantry Brigade of the Indian Army. Additionally, the Brigade Headquarters of the same brigade formation has been cleared for construction over a land of 40 ha (400,000 m^{2}).

== Demography ==
=== Census ===
According to the 2011 census of India, Chushul has a population of 949 people living in 148 households. The effective literacy rate (i.e. the literacy rate of population excluding children aged 6 and below) is 61.47%.

Demographics (2011 Census)
	Total	Male	Female
Population	949	489	460
Children aged below 6 years	121	69	52
Scheduled caste	0	0	0
Scheduled tribe	945	489	456
Literates	509	315	194
Workers (all)	556	278	278
Main workers (total)	398	244	154
Main workers: Cultivators	197	130	67
Main workers: Agricultural labourers	18	12	6
Main workers: Household industry workers	25	14	11
Main workers: Other	158	88	70
Marginal workers (total)	158	34	124
Marginal workers: Cultivators	49	25	24
Marginal workers: Agricultural labourers	13	2	11
Marginal workers: Household industry workers	85	2	83
Marginal workers: Others	11	5	6
Non-workers	393	211	182

=== Culture ===
During the winter season, Ice hockey is the main sport in Chushul. The youth of Chushul has a keen interest in playing ice hockey. The Chushul Ice Hockey team recently participated in the district as well as the CEC cup which was held at Leh at Karzoo and the new ice hockey ring at NDS Ground.

== Military ==
Chushul is a base for the Indian Military, including the brigade headquarter for the "[List of regiments and corps of the Indian Army|142 Infantry Regiment]" and company headquarter for the "135 Field Workshop" company.

== Economy ==
Most of the people are dependent on the rearing of goat and yak. In the field of agriculture, barley and pea are main crops of the season. During the chilly winter season, Chushul is cut off from main the capital city of Leh. In Chushul, various associations have played an important role in developing Chushul's economy, politics and education system. Some of these associations are Women's Alliance Chushul, Student Union of Chushul, Youth Association of Chushul, Gonpa Community of Chushul and Ex. Service Men Association of Chushul.

There are five schools in Chushul: Govt. High school Chushul, Govt. Middle school Buk, Govt Middle School Tailing, Central Institute of Buddhist Studies.

== Transportation ==
Chushul, which has a military airstrip which is not available for the civilian flights, is connected by the following roads:

- Chushul-Lukung Road (CC road), also called the Surtok-Kakstet-Chushul Road (CKC road), parallel to the southern bank of Pangong Tso, provides shortest route from Spangmik, Man & Merak to Chushul.
  - Thakung Post Road: is a 5.8 km long spur of "Chushul-Lukung Road" from a T-section and it goes to Thakung Post of Indian Military, constructed under ICBR Phase-III.
- Pangong Lakeshore Road (PL road), is a motorable road along the scenic southern shore of Pangong Tso.
- Chushul-Dungti-Fukche-Demchok highway (CDFD road), along the southern bank of Indus River which marks the LAC, will be converted to a single-lane 7.45 m wide 135 km long national highway with paved shoulder by 31 March 2025. Chushul and Fukche Airstrips lies along this highway. It will also provide faster access to the Nyoma airbase. This will boost military logistics and tourism in the border area.

- Mahe-Chushul Road (MCR), via Kartsangla, will be completed by the BRO by December 2023 (August 2023 update).

== See also ==
- Geography of Ladakh
- India-China Border Roads
- Sino-Indian border dispute
- Tourism in Ladakh

== Bibliography ==
- Drew, Frederic (1875), The Jummoo and Kashmir Territories: A Geographical Account, E. Stanford – via archive.org
- Ward, A. E. (1896), The Tourist's and Sportsman's guide to Kashmir and Ladak, Thaker, Spink & Co – via archive.org
