= Spanggur Gap =

Mountain pass in China and India

- Location within Ladakh Location within Ngari

Location
- Location: Ladakh, India – Tibet, China
- Range: Pangong Range–Kailash Range
- Coordinates: 33°34′23″N 78°46′48″E

The Spanggur Gap (Chinese: 斯潘古爾山口; pinyin: Sī pān gǔ ěr shānkǒu) is a 4,900 metres (16,100 ft) high mountain pass on the Line of Actual Control between the Ladakh union territory of India and the Rutog County, Ngari Prefecture in the Tibet region of China. It is a gap in the mountains to the south of the Pangong Lake. To the east of the gap is the Spanggur Lake.

According to Indian sources, India was in control of the Spanggur Gap during the war of 1962 and there were Indian posts there, but it was taken over by the Chinese army during the Sino-Indian War as the Indian army withdrew in order to bolster defenses of the nearby Indian village of Chushul. India wants to restore the post and take over the pass.

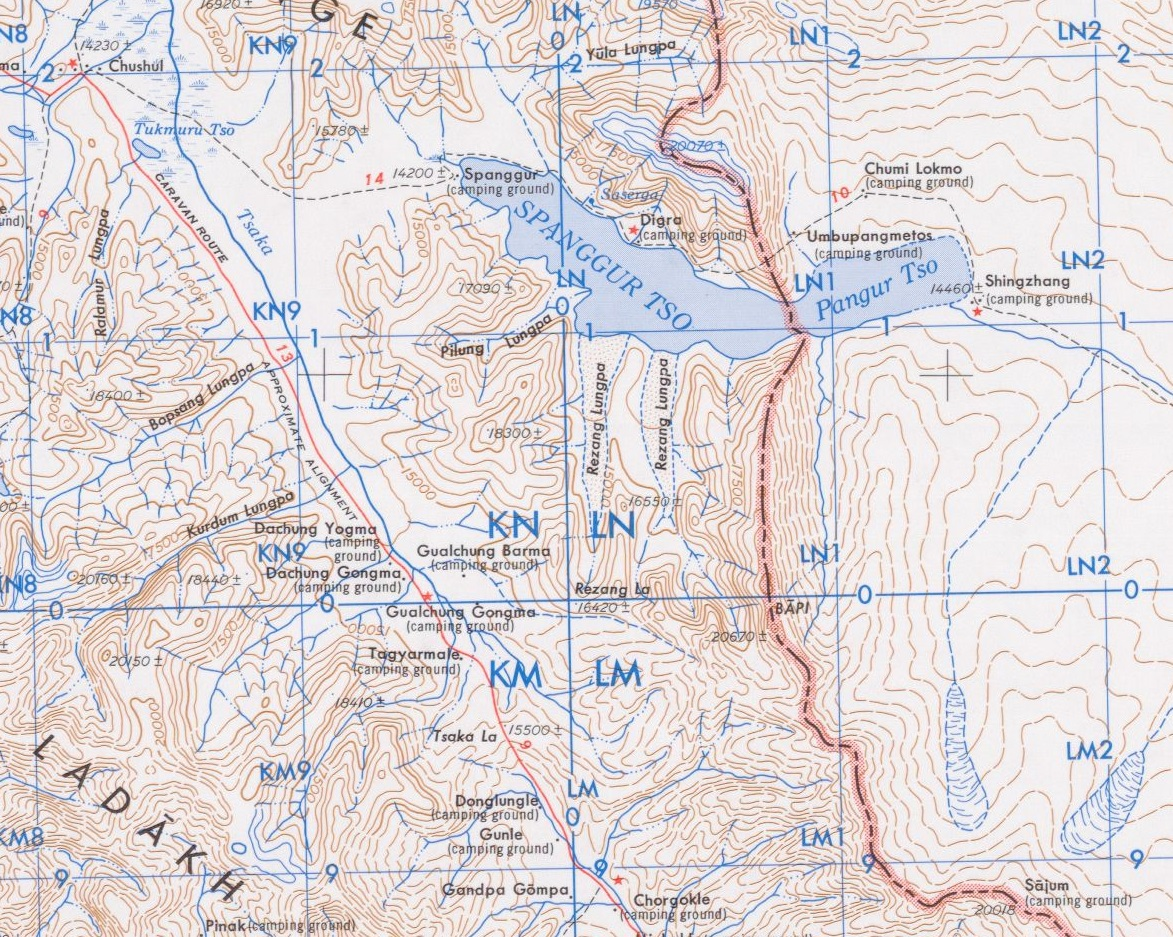
Spanggur Lake basin (US_AMS,_1954)

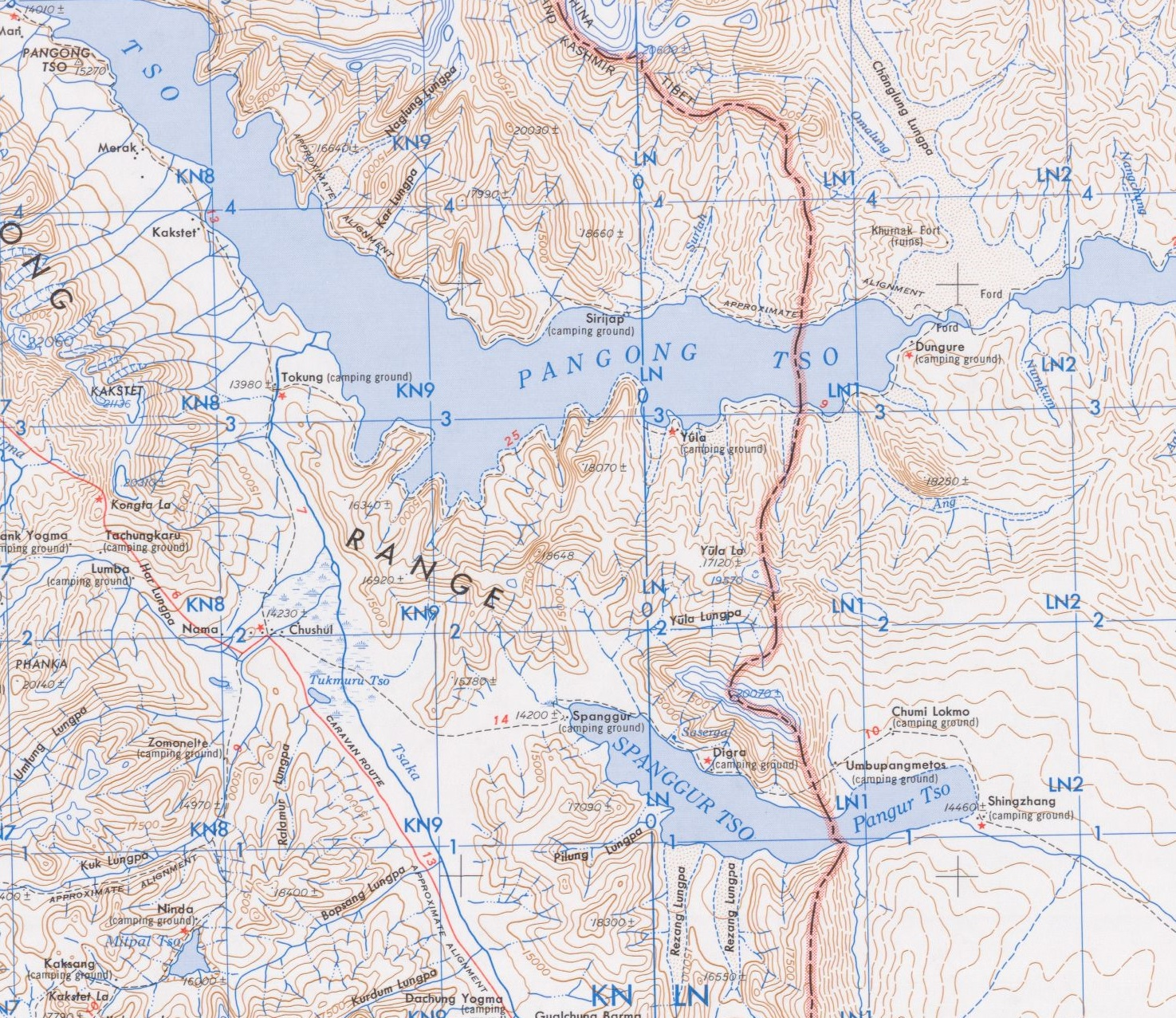
Pangong and Spanggur Lake (US_AMS,_1954)
