= Pangong Range =

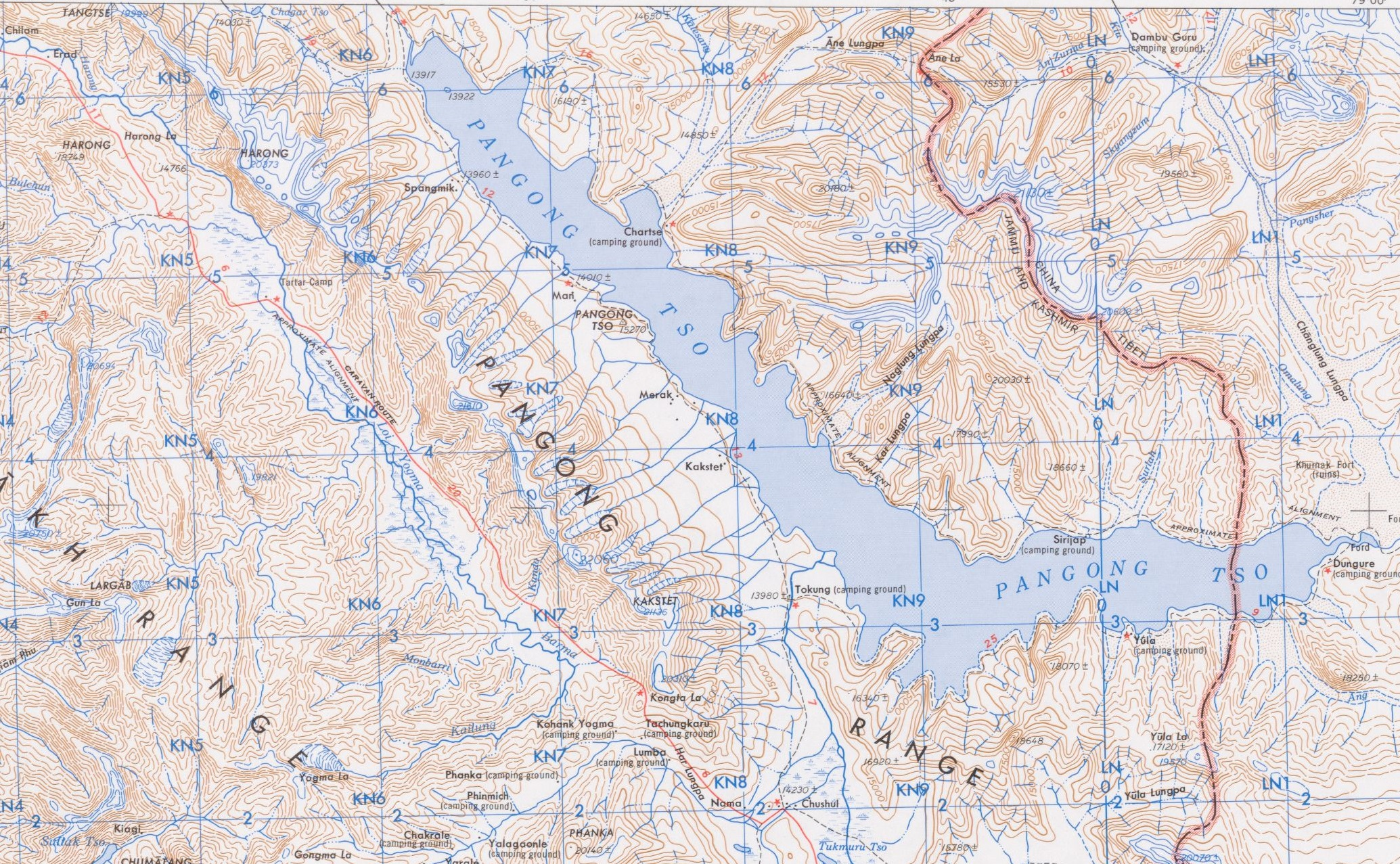
Map including the Pangong Range (AMS, 1954)

The Pangong Range, an approximately 100-km-long mountain range along the southern shore of the Pangong Lake in the northern Indian region of Ladakh, runs north of and parallel to the Ladakh Range from Tangtse in the northwest to Chushul in the southeast. Its highest peak is 6,700 m (22,000 ft), and the northern slopes are heavily glaciated. Changchenmo Range and Pangong Range are sometimes considered the easternmost part of the Karakoram Range. At Chushul, where the Pangong Range ends, the Kailash Range runs eastward along the southern bank of Pangong Tso, from centre of Pangong Tso at Lukung to the west to Phursook Bay and Mount Kailash. Main features of the Pangong Range, from northwest to southeast, include: Harong peak, Merag peak, Kangju Kangri peak, and Kongta La pass.

== See also ==
- Geography of Pangong Tso
- Geography of Ladakh
- Geography of Himalayas
- Geology of the Himalayas
- Geography of Tibet
- Tourism in Ladakh
- India-China Border Roads

== Bibliography ==
- Dortch, Jason M.; Owen, Lewis A.; Caffee, Marc W.; Kamp, Ulrich (2011). "Catastrophic partial drainage of Pangong Tso, northern India and Tibet". Geomorphology. 125 (1): 109–121. Bibcode:2011Geomo.125..109D. doi:10.1016/j.geomorph.2010.08.017. ISSN 0169-555X.
- Godwin-Austen, H. H. (1867), "Notes on the Pangong Lake District of Ladakh, from a Journal made during a Survey in 1863", The Journal of the Royal Geographical Society of London, 37, London: J. Murray: 343–363, doi:10.2307/1798534, JSTOR 1798534
- Strachey, Henry (1854), Physical Geography of Western Tibet, London: William Clows and Sons – via archive.org
