= Pangong Tso =

Soda lake located in Ladakh and Tibet

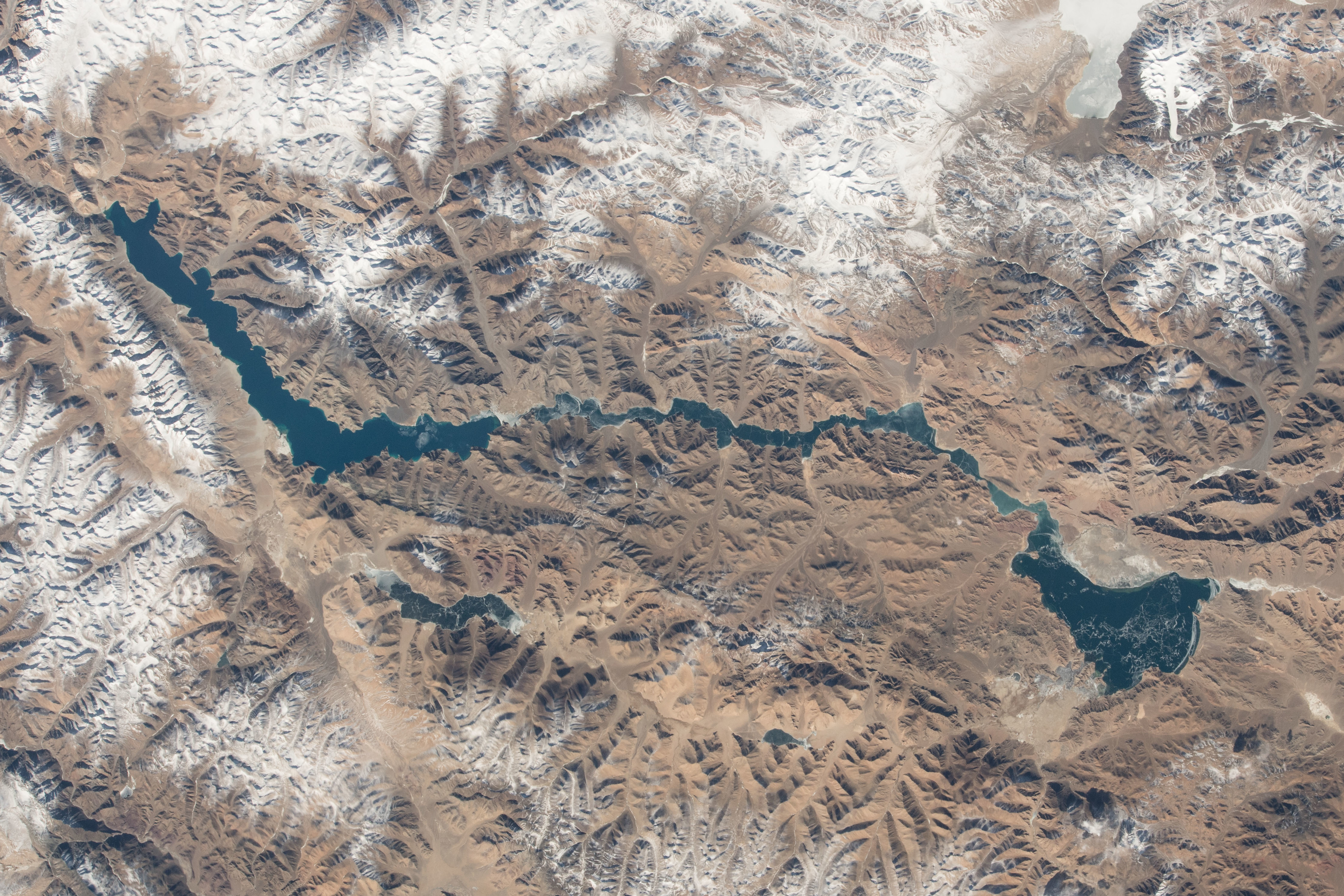
- A view of Pangong Tso from space

- Location of Pangong Lake
- Interactive map of Pangong Tso
- Location: Leh district, Ladakh, India; Rutog County, Tibet, China
- Coordinates: 33°43′04.59″N 78°53′48.48″E
- Type: Soda, dimictic lake (east basin); Saline lake (west basin)
- Basin countries: China, India
- Max. length: 134 km (83 mi)
- Max. width: 5 km (3.1 mi)
- Surface area: 604 km^{2} (233 sq mi)
- Max. depth: 330 ft (100 m)
- Surface elevation: 14,200 ft (4,300 m)
- Frozen: In winter

Pangong Tso

Chinese name
- Traditional Chinese: 班公錯
- Simplified Chinese: 班公错
Transcriptions
Standard Mandarin
- Hanyu Pinyin: Bāngōng cuò
- Wade–Giles: Pan-kung ts'o

Tibetan name
- Tibetan: སྤང་གོང་མཚོ
Transcriptions
- Wylie: spang gong mtsho
- THL: pangongtso
- Tibetan Pinyin: Banggong Co

Tsomo Nganglha Ringpo

Chinese name
- Traditional Chinese: 錯木昂拉仁波
- Simplified Chinese: 錯木昂拉仁波
Transcriptions
Standard Mandarin
- Hanyu Pinyin: Cuòmù ánglā rénbō

Tibetan name
- Tibetan: མཚོ་མོ་ངང་ལྷ་རིང་པོ
Transcriptions
- Wylie: mtsho mo ngang lha ring po
- THL: tsomo nganglha ringpo
- Tibetan Pinyin: Como Nganglharingbo

Pangong Tso or Pangong Lake (Note: Tibetan: སྤང་གོང་མཚོ; Chinese: 班公错; pinyin: Bān gōng cuò) is an endorheic lake spanning eastern Ladakh in India and Ngari Prefecture in Tibet. Situated at an elevation of 14,200 ft (4,300 m), it occupies an area of approximately 604 km^{2} (233 sq mi). It stretches for 134 km (83 mi) and is 5 km (3.1 mi) wide at its broadest point. It is located in a landlocked basin and is separated from the Indus River basin by an elevated ridge. The water is saline in the western part and alkaline in the eastern part. The lake freezes during winter.

Approximately two-thirds of the lake lies within the area administered by China, with the remainder controlled by India. The Line of Actual Control, which demarcates the Sino-Indian border, passes through the lake. A section of the lake is claimed both by China and India, and has been part of the wider Sino-Indian border dispute. As a result of the dispute, the region saw conflict during the Sino-Indian War in 1962 and 2020–2021 China–India skirmishes.

== Etymology ==
Historically, the name Pangong Tso only applied to the westernmost of the five sub-lakes that was in Ladakh. On the Tibetan side, the two larger parts of the lake, called Nyak Tso (the "middle lake"), sandwiched the twin smaller lakes of Rum Tso. The whole lake group is often referred to as Tsomo Nganglha Ringpo (Tibetan: མཚོ་མོ་ངང་ལྷ་རིང་པོ) in the Tibetan language.

There are different interpretations of the meanings of Pangong Tso and Tsomo Nganglha Ringpo. As per the Government of Ladakh, "Pangong Tso" means "high grassland lake" in Tibetan. However, other literature states that "Pangong" means "hollow" or "concave". Tsomo Nganglha Ringpo is interpreted to have various similar meanings in Tibetan. Chinese media sources state that it means "long, narrow, enchanted lake", while it has been described as "female narrow very long lake" by European explorers, and "long-necked swan lake" by other sources.

== Geography ==
Pangong Tso spans the Leh district in the Indian union territory of Ladakh, and the Ngari Prefecture in the Tibet Autonomous Region of China. The boomerang-shaped lake, is situated at an altitude of 14,200 ft (4,300 m), and is one of the highest brackish water lakes in the world. The lake stretches for 134 km (83 mi), and is about 5 km (3.1 mi) wide at its broadest point. The lake is surrounded by several mountain ranges–the Changchenmo Range to the north, Pangong Range to the west, and Gangdise Shan (Kailash Range) to the south. The Changchenmo and Pangong Ranges form the easternmost parts of the Karakoram. Mountain spurs of the Chang Chenmo range extend into the lake, forming several "fingers".

Pangong Tso is located in an endorheic basin, separated from the Indus River basin by a small elevated ridge. Formerly, the lake had an outlet to the Shyok River, a tributary of the Indus River, but it was closed off by natural damming. Five streams feed the lake from the Indian side, forming marshes and wetlands along the western edges of the lake. Strand lines above the current lake level reveal a 5 m (16 ft) thick layer of mud and laminated sand, suggesting the lake has shrunk recently on the geological scale.

The eastern part of the lake has a relatively low salinity, with the total dissolved solids (TDS) content of 0.68 g/L, and is highly alkaline, while the western part of the lake is more saline, with the TDS of 11.02 g/L. Despite its high salinity, the lake freezes in the winter.

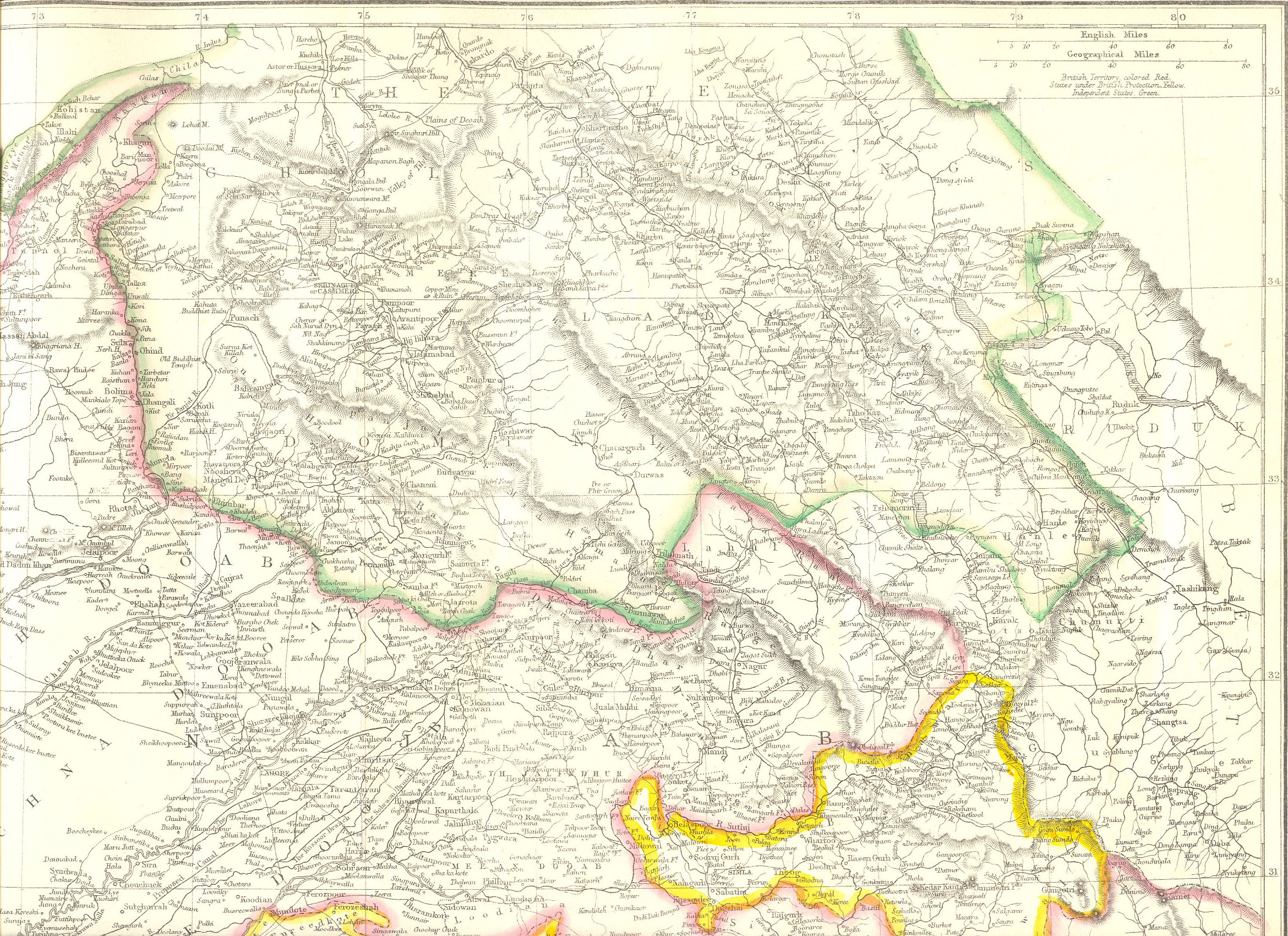
Edward Weller's map of Ladakh and Garhwal, 1863

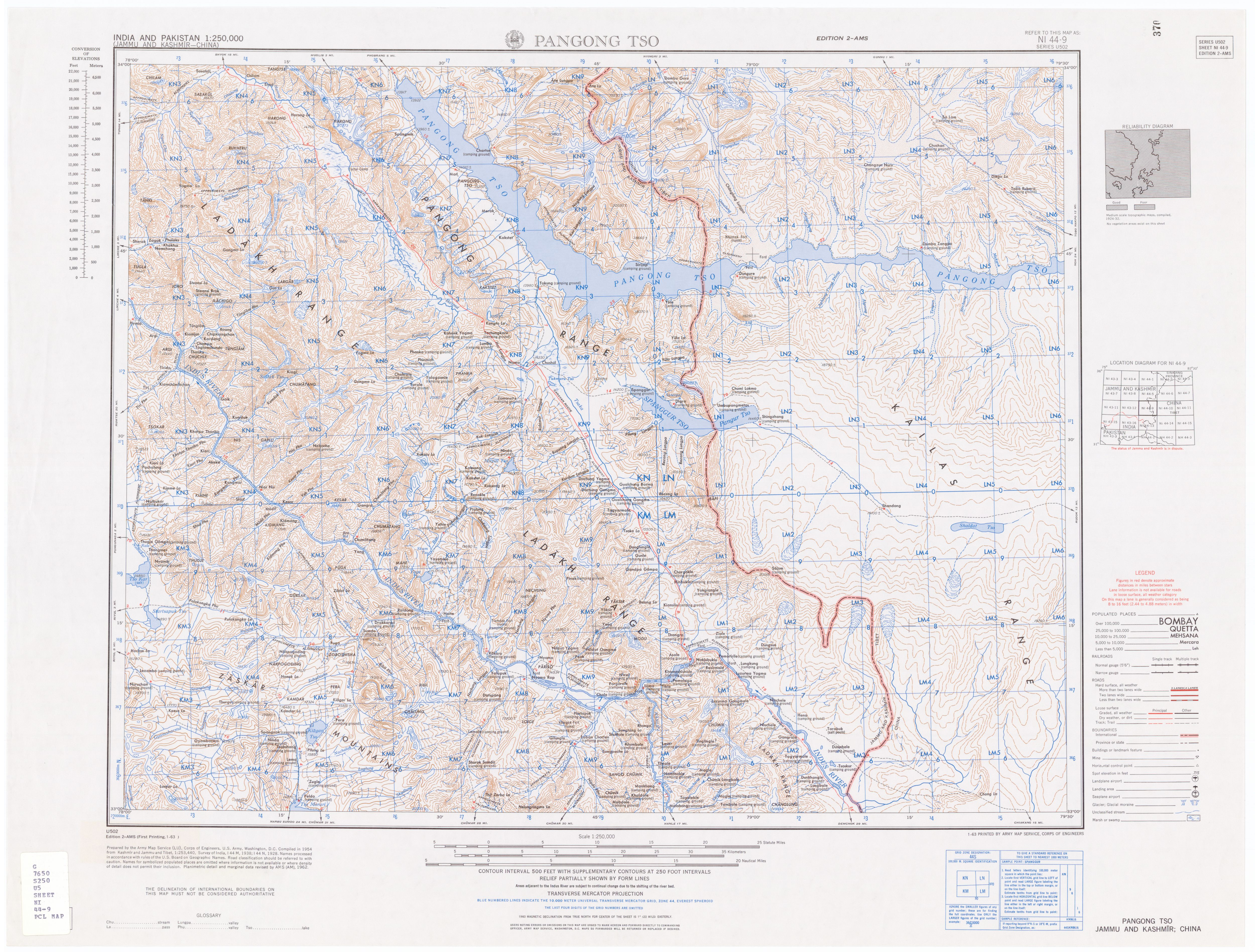
Map of Pangong Tso, Army Map Service, 1954

Map of Pangong Tso, Defense Mapping Agency, 1992

=== Climate ===
Climate data for Pangong Tso
Month	Jan	Feb	Mar	Apr	May	Jun	Jul	Aug	Sep	Oct	Nov	Dec	Year
Mean daily maximum °C (°F)	−5.9 (21.4)	−3.7 (25.3)	0.9 (33.6)	6.9 (44.4)	11.6 (52.9)	17.4 (63.3)	20.5 (68.9)	19.7 (67.5)	15.5 (59.9)	7.9 (46.2)	1.5 (34.7)	−3.3 (26.1)	7.4 (45.4)
Daily mean °C (°F)	−13.3 (8.1)	−10.8 (12.6)	−6.0 (21.2)	−0.5 (31.1)	3.8 (38.8)	9.5 (49.1)	13.1 (55.6)	12.7 (54.9)	7.8 (46.0)	−0.3 (31.5)	−6.8 (19.8)	−11.3 (11.7)	−0.2 (31.7)
Mean daily minimum °C (°F)	−20.6 (−5.1)	−17.9 (−0.2)	−12.8 (9.0)	−7.8 (18.0)	−3.9 (25.0)	1.6 (34.9)	5.8 (42.4)	5.7 (42.3)	0.2 (32.4)	−8.5 (16.7)	−15.1 (4.8)	−19.3 (−2.7)	−7.7 (18.1)
Average precipitation mm (inches)	4 (0.2)	2 (0.1)	3 (0.1)	3 (0.1)	4 (0.2)	2 (0.1)	11 (0.4)	15 (0.6)	4 (0.2)	2 (0.1)	2 (0.1)	3 (0.1)	55 (2.3)
Source: Climate-Data.org

== Sino-Indian border dispute ==
Map showing the Line of Actual Control (Note: The Line of Actual Control (LAC) displayed in the map is as marked by the OpenStreetMap editors, and reflects the traditional customary boundary line marked in the Chinese maps. There Sino-India border along the LAC is roughly divided into three sectors, western, middle and eastern. It runs from Ane Pass southwards, along the mountain ridge and passes through peak 6,127 (approximately 78° 46' E, 38° 50' N) and then southwards to the northern bank of the Pangong Lake (approximately 78° 49' E, 33° 44' N). It crosses the lake and reaches its southern bank at approximately 78° 43' E, 33° 40' N. Then it traverses in a south-easterly direction along the watershed dividing the Tongada River and the streams flowing into the Spanggur Lake until it reaches Mount Sajum. The "fingers" are mountain spurs jutting into the lake.) and important features and locations along the Pangong Lake.

Approximately two-thirds of the lake lies within the area administered by China, with the remaining controlled by India. The Line of Actual Control (LAC), which demarcates the Sino-Indian border, passes through the lake. India claims the Johnson-Ardagh Line as the official boundary, while China recongises the Macartney–MacDonald Line. There are two disputed areas– the Aksai Chin, and the Ladakh-Tibet boundary extending from the Changchenmo Valley, north of Pangong Tso.

Khurnak Fort lies on the northern bank of the lake, and the dispute over the control of the area was discussed in a 1924 conference between the British Raj, on behalf of Jammu and Kashmir and Tibet, which remained inconclusive. Although, the British later felt that the Tibetans had a better case, they dropped further claims in 1929, following protests from the Kashmir state against the British. The Chinese established their military presence in the Khurnak Fort by 1958.

On 20 October 1962, Pangong Tso saw military action during the Sino-Indian War, which resulted in a decisive win for the Chinese People's Liberation Army. The dispute is along the eight fingers (mountainous spurs) on the lake, located close to the LAC. Traditionally, three of these fingers are within the Indian controlled territory. While India claims the other five fingers as part of its territory, it has been jointly patrolled by the Indian and Chinese forces since the end of the 1962 war. After the war, the area remained a sensitive border zone, with frequent incursions by the Chinese.

In August 2017, Indian and Chinese forces engaged in a fight near Pangong Tso. As prior agreements prohibited the use of firearms near the LAC, the melee involved kicking, punching, rock throwing, and use of makeshift weapons such as sticks and rods. On 11 September 2019, the Chinese troops confronted the Indian troops on the northern bank of the lake. In early May 2020, the Chinese occupied positions up to Finger 4, and obstructed Indian patrols that had previously reached Finger 8. On 5–6 May 2020, a face-off between about 250 Indian and Chinese troops near the lake resulted in casualties on both sides.

On 29–30 August 2020, Indian troops occupied higher positions on the south bank of Pangong Tso such as Rezang La, Reqin La, Black Top, Hanan, Helmet, Gurung Hill, Gorkha Hill and Magar Hill. Some of these are located in the grey zone of the LAC and overlook the Chinese camps on the other side of the lake. Both the militaries also stationed vessels on the lake. In February 2021, both the sides agreed to withdraw from their positions on the north and south banks, with China pulling back eastwards of Finger 8 and India to Finger 3, and the intermediate zone was designated as a no-patrol buffer zone.

== Transportation ==
On the Indian side, a motorable road connects Phobrang with the border outpost of Hot Springs in the Chang Chenmo Valley via Marsimik La, which then extends till "Finger 4" on the northern bank of the Pangong Tso. A 32 km (20 mi)-long road connects Lukung with Chartse near the "Finger 1" on northwest bank of Pangong Tso. The Chushul-Lukung road was extended 5.8 km (3.6 mi) to connect to the Thakung post on the south bank of the lake.

On the Tibetan side, the China National Highway 219 passes along the eastern end of Pangong Tso. In August 2021, China began building a bridge spanning the narrowest part of the lake, near Khurnak Fort. The first bridge was completed in April 2022, and bypassed the 180 km (110 mi)-long route from Khurnak to the south bank of the lake. China started building a second higher bridge across the lake, which was 515 m (1,690 ft)-long and 9 m (30 ft)-wide, in 2022. The second bridge was completed in July 2024. India opposed the construction of these bridges,s stating that they were built on illegally occupied territory. A road connects to the village of Shandong on the south bank.

== Tourism ==
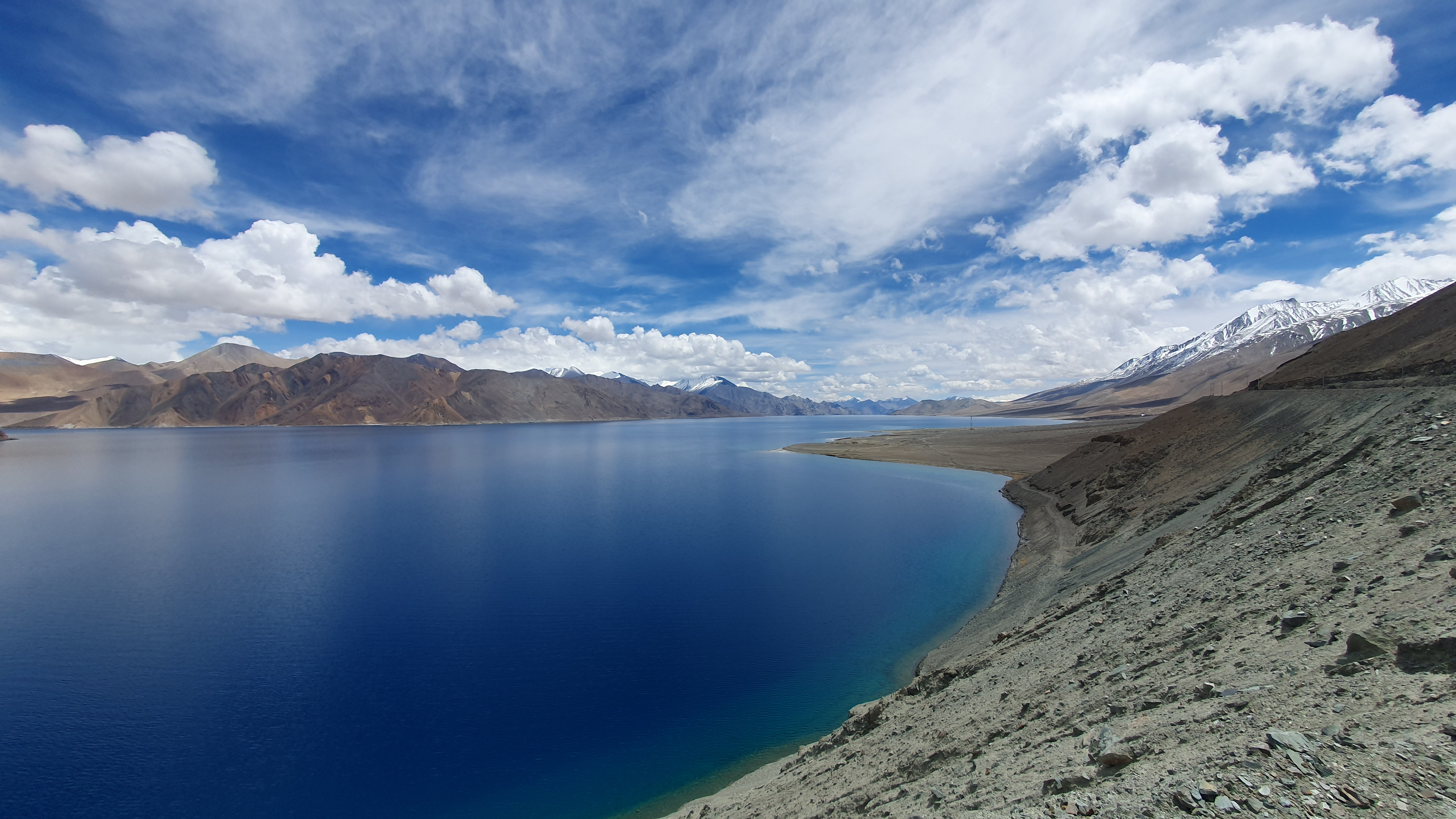
Pangong Tso in eastern Ladakh

Pangong Tso is part of the Bharat Ranbhoomi Darshan initiative of the Indian Armed Forces, aimed at boosting local infrastructure and tourism, and providing information on historical battleground locations. An Inner Line Permit is required to visit the lake on the Indian side, as it lies on the Sino-Indian border. Groups are to be accompanied by an accredited guide, and no boating is permitted for security reasons. However, a surge in Indian tourists has presented environmental challenges due to inadequate infrastructure to accommodate and manage the growing number of visitors. The Pangong Frozen Lake Marathon is held annually in February to promote winter tourism at Pangong Tso.

On the Chinese side, tourists can rent a boat on the lake, while landing on islands is not allowed, to protecting avian breeding grounds. There are a few restaurants located along the shore.

== Flora and fauna ==
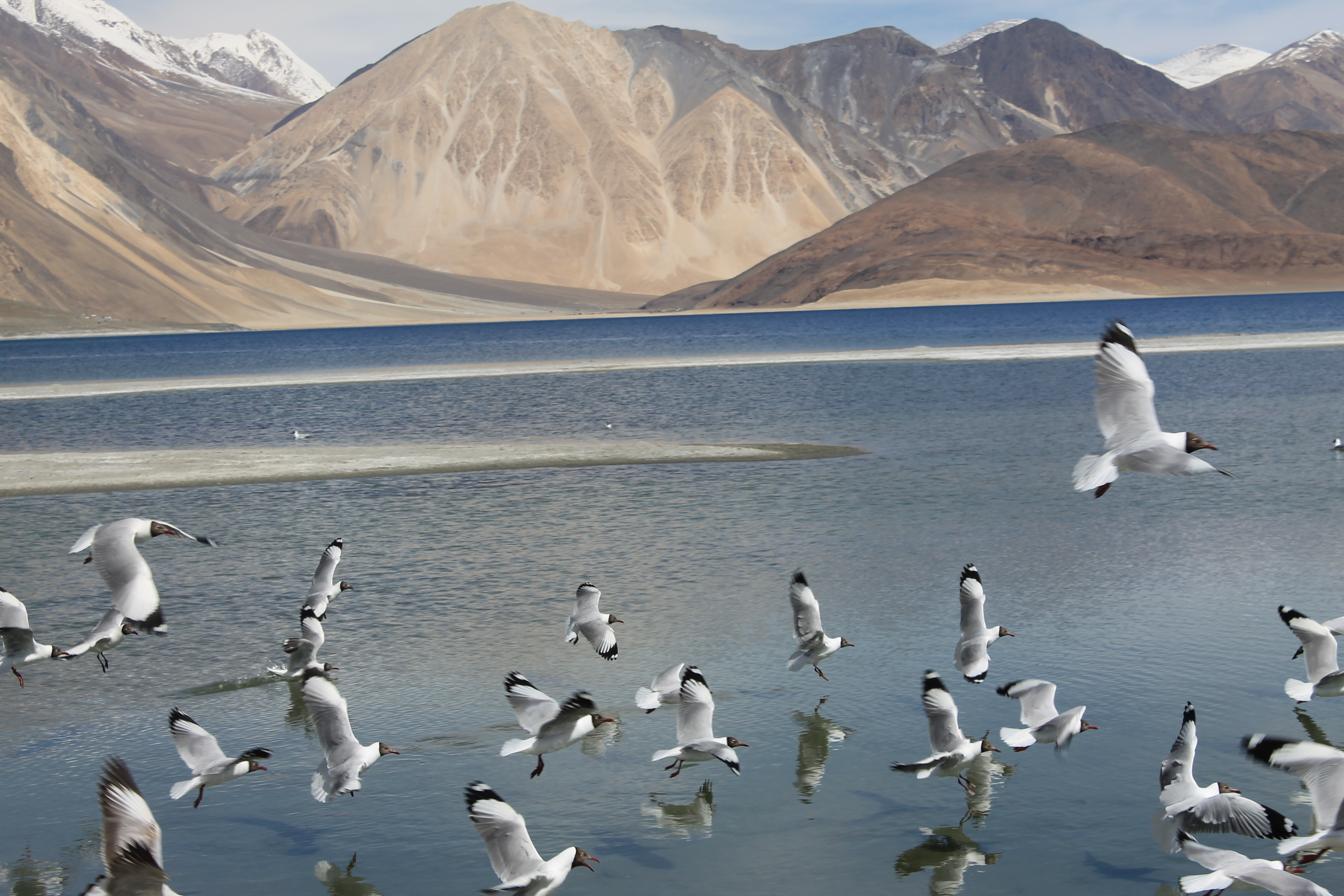
Birds at Pangong Tso

Due to its extreme salinity, there is no vegetation in the deeper parts of the Pangong Tso. There are grasslands along the margins and marshes in the west, and sedges and grasses along the northern and eastern shore. Low thorn scrubs and herbs cover the surrounding hills and raised ledges.

On the Chinese side, the lake hosts certain fish species such as false osman, and Kunar snowtrout. Freshwater snails of the genus Radix have also been noted in the lake.

The lake acts as an important breeding ground for a variety of birds, including a number of migratory species such as the bar-headed goose, and ruddy shelduck. The black-necked crane, which breeds in the nearby Chushul, uses the lake as its foraging ground. Bird Islet is a popular location for bird-watching in the Ngari Prefecture. The surrounding hills support several species of Himalayan wildlife including snow leopard, Indian wild ass, argali, urial, bharal, Tibetan gazelle, Himalayan wolf, red fox, and Himalayan marmot.

== See also ==
- National Large Solar Telescope – Indian observatory in Ladakh
- Rudok – Village in Rutog County, Ngari, Tibet
- Sirijap – Landform in India and China
- Tangtse – Settlement in Ladakh, India
