= Ladakh Range =

Mountain range in India and Pakistan

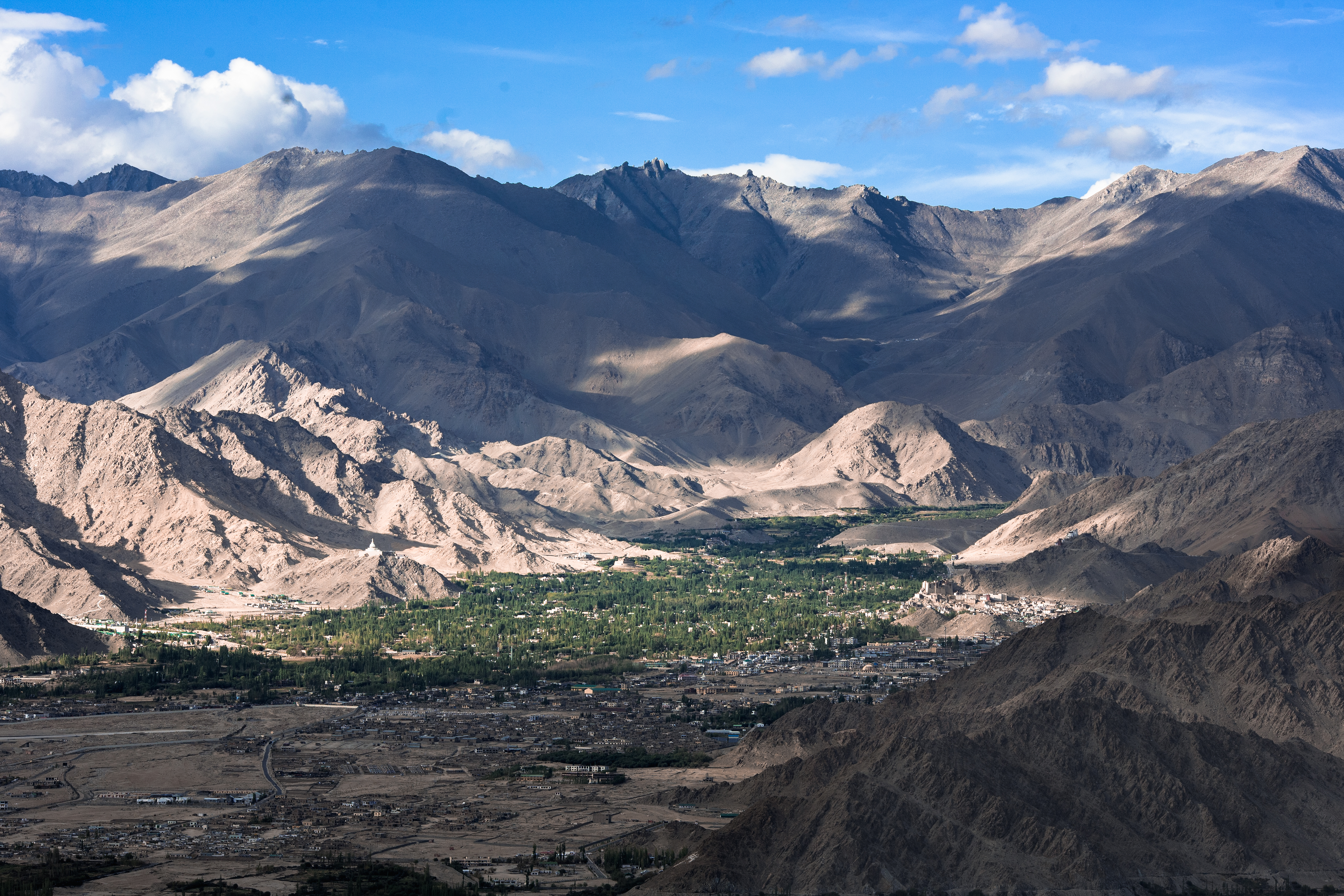
- View of Ladakh Range above Leh

Dimensions
- Length: 370 km (230 mi)

Geography
- Interactive map outlining Ladakh range
- Country: India
- Territory: Ladakh, Baltistan
- District: Leh
- City: Leh
- Range coordinates: 34.66°N 76.88°E
- Parent range: Karakoram
- Borders on: Kailash Range

The Ladakh Range is a mountain range in central Ladakh in India with its northern tip extending into Baltistan in Pakistan. It lies between the Indus and Shyok river valleys, stretching to 230 miles (370 km). Leh, the capital city of Ladakh, is at the foot of the Ladakh Range in the Indus river valley.

== Geography ==
The Ladakh Range is regarded as a southern extension of the Karakoram Range, which runs for 230 miles (370 km) from the confluence of the Indus and Shyok rivers in Baltistan to the Tibetan border of Ladakh in the southeast. The southern extension of the Ladakh Range is called the Kailash Range, especially in Tibet.

The Ladakh Range forms the northeastern bank of the Indus River and the western bank of the Shyok River.

The Ladakh Range has an average height of about 6,000 metres and has no major peaks. Some of its peaks are less than 4,800 metres.

The main mountain passes are Chorbat (5,090 metres), Digar La (5,400 metres), Khardung La (5,602 metres), Chang La (5,599 metres) and Tsaka La (4,724 metres).

== Habitation ==
The city of Leh lies in the Indus Valley at the foot of the Ladakh Range. Leh is a historic trading town with trade routes to Yarkand and Tibet on the one hand, and Srinagar and rest of the Indian subcontinent on the other. The summer route from Leh to Yarkand passed through Khardung La to pass into the Nubra valley and thence to Yarkand via the Karakoram Pass and Suget Pass (in the Trans-Karakoram Tract). The winter route passed through Digar La to reach the Shyok River valley and, again, reach the Karakoram Pass. The trade route to Tibet went via Gartok in the Indus river valley at the foot of the Kailash Range. By the Treaty of Tingmosgang signed in 1684, Ladakh had the exclusive right to trade in the pashmina wool from Tibet, which led to its prosperity.

== Bibliography ==
- Karim, Afsir (2009), "Strategic dimensions of the trans-Himalayan frontiers", in K. Warikoo (ed.), Himalayan Frontiers of India: Historical, Geo-Political and Strategic Perspectives, Routledge, pp. 56–66, ISBN 978-1-134-03294-5
- Kaul, H. N. (1998), Rediscovery of Ladakh, Indus Publishing, ISBN 978-81-7387-086-6
- Mehra, Parshotam (1992), An "agreed" frontier: Ladakh and India's northernmost borders, 1846-1947, Oxford University Press, ISBN 978-0-19-562758-9
- Negi, S. S. (1998), Discovering the Himalaya, Volume 1, Indus Publishing, ISBN 978-81-7387-079-8
- Warikoo, K. (2009), "India's gateway to Central Asia: trans-Himalayan trade and cultural movements through Kashmir and Ladakh, 1846–1947", in K. Warikoo (ed.), Himalayan Frontiers of India: Historical, Geo-Political and Strategic Perspectives, Routledge, pp. 1–13, ISBN 978-1-134-03294-5
