= Spanggur Tso =

Lake in Tibet, China

- Mandong Tso
- Location of Spanggur Lake Spanggur Tso (Ladakh)
- Location: Rutog County, Tibet Autonomous Region, China
- Coordinates: 33°32′11″N 78°54′32″E
- Type: Soda lake
- Max. length: 20.9 km (13.0 mi)
- Max. width: Max 4.5 km (2.8 mi) average 2.95 km (1.83 mi)
- Surface area: 61.6 km^{2} (23.8 sq mi)
- Surface elevation: 4,305 metres (14,124 ft)

Spanggur Tso, also called Maindong Tso, Mendong Tso, is a saltwater lake in Rutog County in the Tibet Autonomous Region of China, close to the border with Ladakh. India claims a major portion of the lake as its own territory, as part of Ladakh. To the west of the lake lies the Spanggur Gap, a low pass through which the Line of Actual Control runs. To the north is the much larger lake Pangong Tso. Spanggur Tso is at an elevation of 4,305 meters and has an area of 61.6 square kilometres. The lake's average annual temperature is around -4 to -2 °C, and the annual precipitation is 50 to 75 mm. The western portion of the lake is claimed by India.

== Name ==
The Tibetan name of the lake is Maindong Tso or Mendong Tso (Tibetan: སྨན་གདོང་མཚོ, Wylie: sman gdong mtsho; Chinese: 曼冬错; pinyin: Màn dōng cuò), which means "medicine face lake". In Ladakh, it was known as Tso Rul ("bitter lake") and its waters were described as extremely bitter on account of being salty.

The more common name in English, Spanggur Tso (Tibetan: སྤང་འཁོར་མཚོ, Wylie: Spang 'khor mtsho; Chinese: 斯潘古尔湖; pinyin: Sī pān gǔ ěr hú), owes to the small campsite called "Spanggur" at the northwestern end of the lake at 33°34′47″N 78°48′08″E. Its phonetic spellings vary as Bangkor, Pangkhor and Pangggor.

== Geography ==
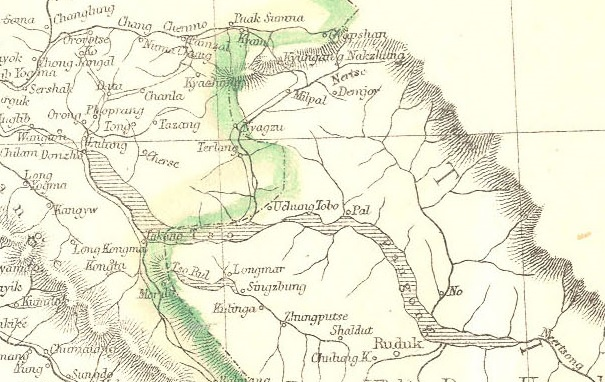
Map 1: Spanggur and Pangong areas mapped by Edward Weller, 1863

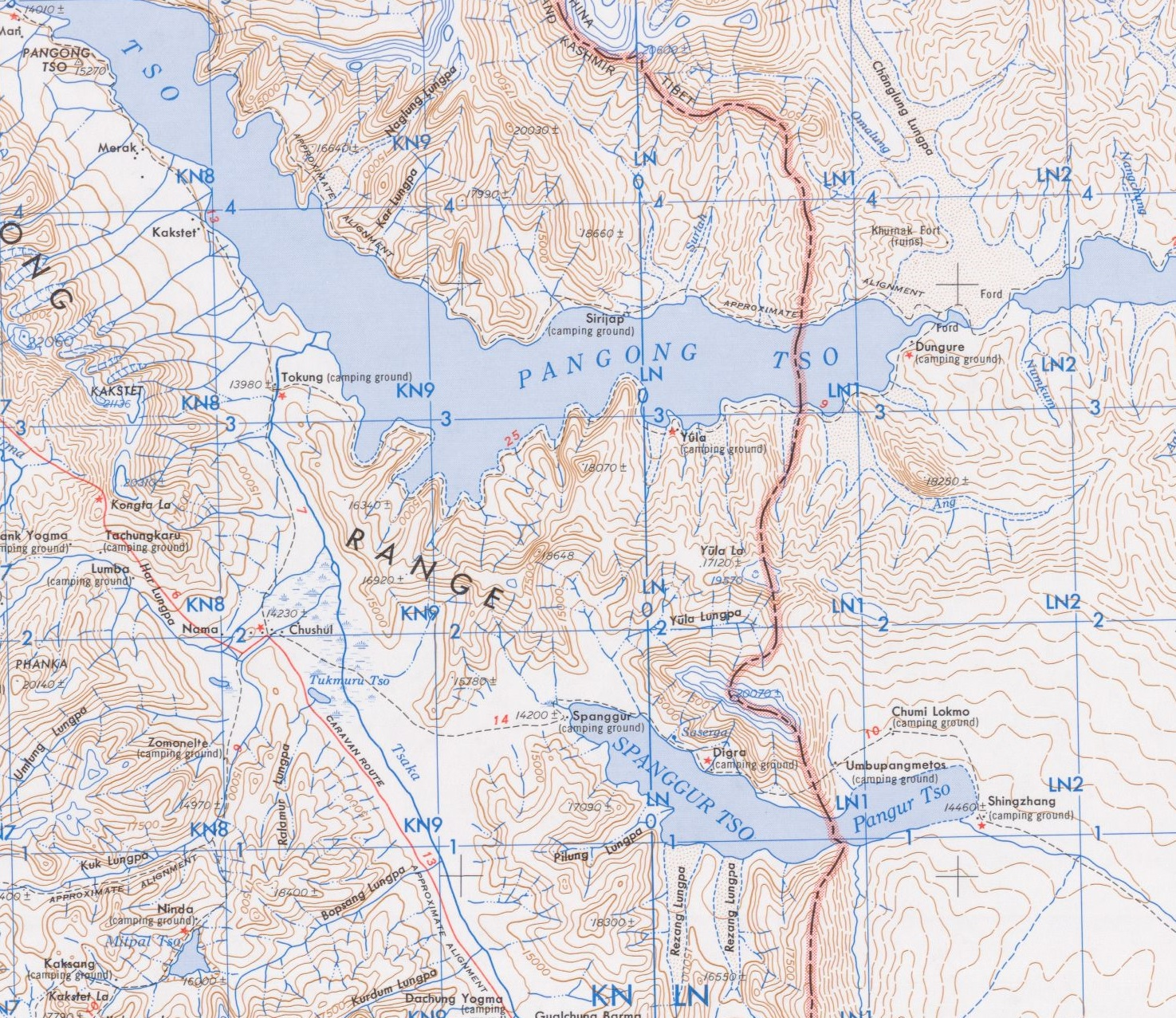
Map 2: Spanggur and Pangong areas (AMS, 1954)

The British Indian explorers in the 19th century knew the lake as Tso Rul ("Bitter Lake") and stated that its waters were extremely bitter. The lake lies in a long valley that connects the Chushul Valley to the Rudok Valley. A single river, Tangre Chu, flows along the valley for 10–12 miles, and drains into the Spanggur Tso. The lake is about 16 miles (26 km) long and less than 2 miles (3.2 km) wide. Henry Strachey found fossil shells of Lymnaea auricularia along its shores, leading to the conclusion that the waters of the lake must have been at one time fresh.

To the west of the lake, there is a gap in the mountains, which is referred to as the Spanggur Gap. The mountains to the north of the gap are thought to belong to the Pangong Range, while those on the south are regarded part of the Kailash Range. The Spanggur Gap connects Spanggur area to the Chushul Valley (or Tsaka Chu valley) running north–south on the Ladakh side of the border. At one time the Spanggur Tso must have drained through the gap into the Tsaka Chu Valley and Pangong Tso. The present state of affairs is believed to be either due to subsidence of the Spanggur Valley.

The British Boundary Commission for Kashmir in 1847 placed the entire Spanggur lake in Tibet's Rudok Dzong (modern Rutog County). (Map 1) The Kashmir Survey, completed in 1864, placed slightly more than half the lake in Ladakh but the eastern extremity in Rudok. (Map 2)

== Chinese administration ==
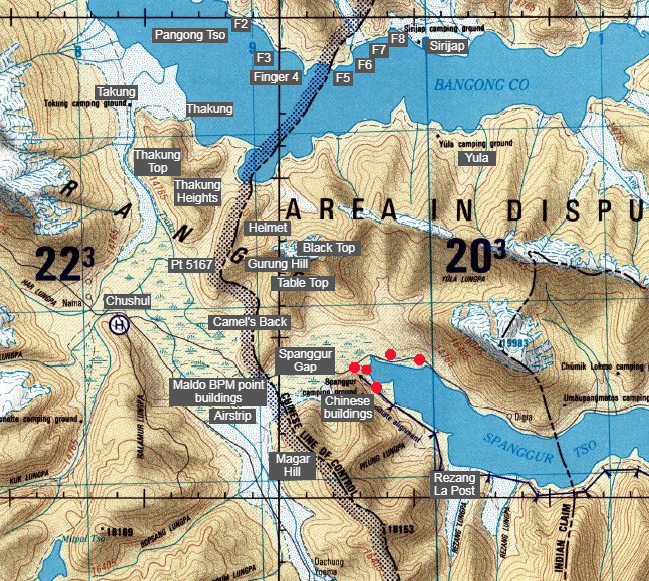
Sino-Indian conflict locations around Spanggur Tso (DMA, 1982)

China established a military camp in the Spanggur area in 1959. During the Sino-Indian War, Chinese troops attacked and overcame four Indian posts in the area in November 1962.

== Neighbourliness ==
In February 2016, the Chinese garrison at Spanggur, referred to as the "Moldo garrison" in the Indian media, conducted a joint exercise with the Chushul garrison in the interest of peace and cooperation. They coordinated rescue missions by joint teams in the event of a natural disaster occurring along the Line of Actual Control (LAC). Similar exercises were continued over the years.

In June 2020, in the midst of major border skirmishes between the two countries, the tactical commanders met at Moldo to find ways of deescalation.

== Map gallery ==
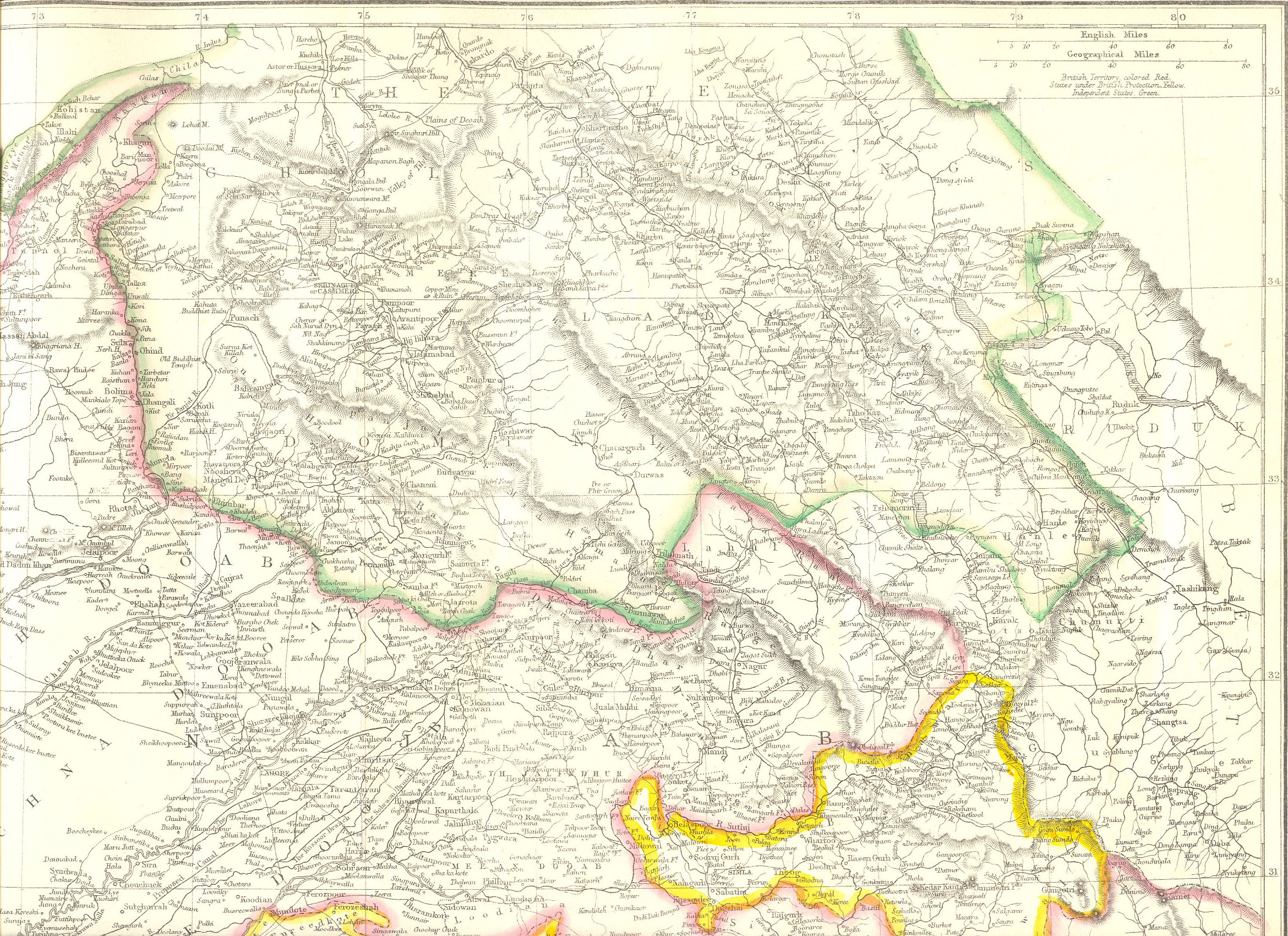
Edward Weller map of Ladakh and Garhwal, 1863

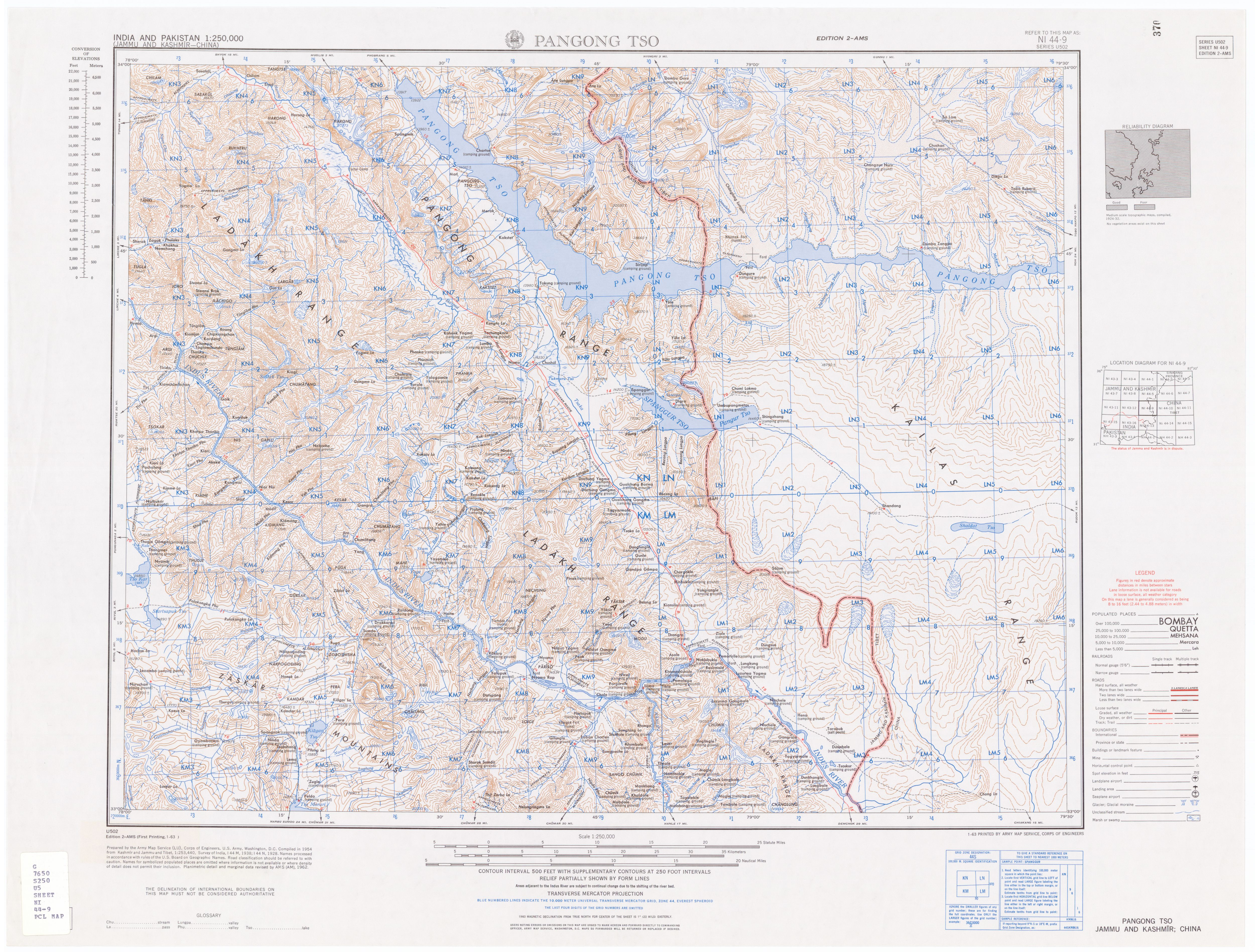
Map including Spanggur Tso / Pangur Tso (AMS, 1954) (Note: From map: "THE DELINEATION OF INTERNATIONAL BOUNDARIES ON THIS MAP MUST NOT BE CONSIDERED AUTHORITATIVE")

Map including Spanggur Tso (DMA, 1982)

== Bibliography ==
- Cunningham, Alexander (1854), Ladak: Physical, Statistical, Historical, London: Wm. H. Allen and Co – via archive.org
- Strachey, Henry (1854), Physical Geography of Western Tibet, London: William Clows and Sons – via archive.org
