= Gangdise Shan =

Mountain range on the Tibetan Plateau

The Kailash Range, (also Kailas, Gangdese or Gangdisê), is a mountain range on the Tibetan Plateau of Tibet Autonomous Region of China.

== Geography ==
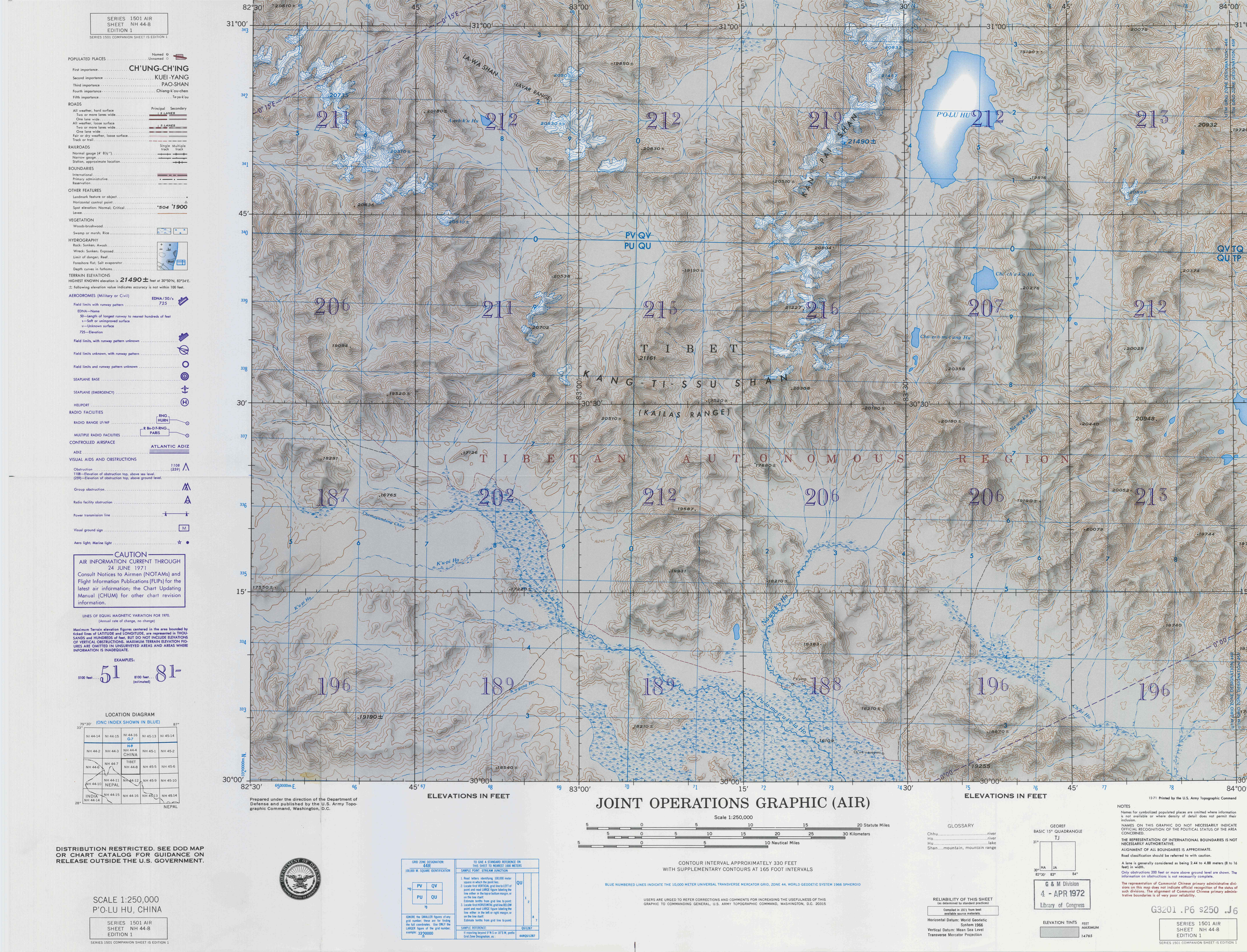
Map including Gangdise Shan (labeled as KANG-TI-SSU SHAN (KAILAS RANGE)) (ATC, 1971).

The Kailash Range is the western subrange of the Transhimalaya system, while Nyenchen Tanglha is the eastern subrange of Transhimalaya. Kailash range has Koyul Ridge to its south, Pangong Range (a subrange of Karakoram Range) to its west, Skakjung pasture & Dumchele border trade village to its south near the disputed India-China "Line of Actual Control" (LAC).

Kailash Range's tallest peak, Lunpo Gangri (7,095 meters or 23,278 feet), is not very famous. The second highest peak, Mount Kailash (6,638 meters or 21,778 feet), is well known across the world as it is the most sacred mountain in four religions: Hinduism, Buddhism, Jainism. and Bon (which shares many similarities and influences with Tibetan Buddhism)

The Indus River system is the main river, which enters India-administered area near Demchok in Demchok sector.

== See also ==
- Gangdese batholith (geology of the area)
- Transhimalayas
