= Geography of Ladakh =

Topology of the Ladakh region, with Srinagar and Anantnag in the Kashmir valley to west, Lahaul and Spiti in Himachal Pradesh in south, and Kyrgyzstan visible to north. Vertical scale is exaggerated.

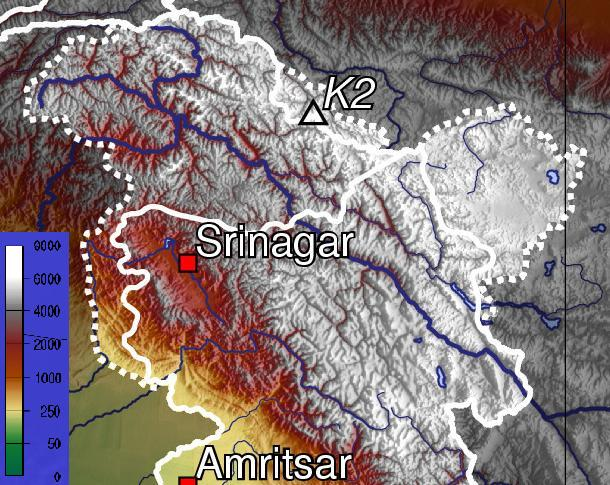
Ladakh region has high altitude.

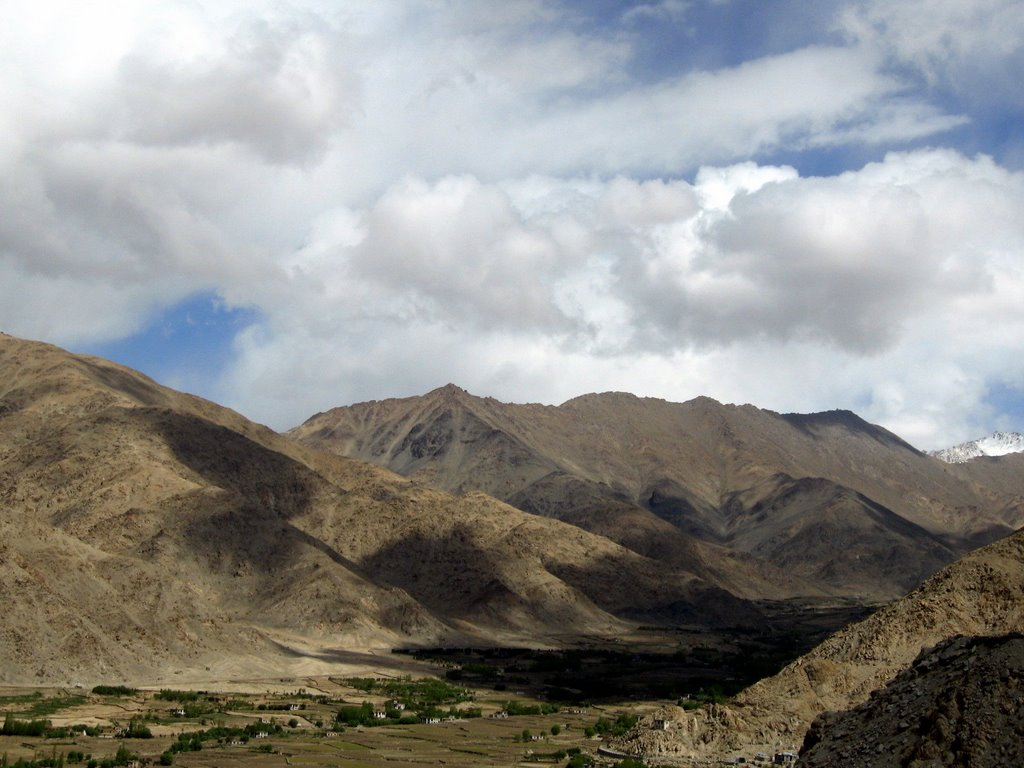
Landscape in Ladakh.

Ladakh is an administrative territory of India that has been under its control since 1947. The geographical region of Ladakh union territory is the highest altitude plateau region in India (much of it being over 3,000 m), incorporating parts of the Himalayan and Karakoram mountain ranges and the upper Indus River and valley.

== Political geography ==
Historic Ladakh consists of a number of distinct areas (mainly under Indian rule), including the fairly populous main Indus valley, the more remote Zanskar (in the south) and Nubra valleys (to the north over Khardung La in the Ladakh mountain range, a high motorable pass at 5,359 metres (17,582 ft)), the almost deserted Aksai Chin (under Chinese rule) and the predominantly Shi'ite Muslim Kargil and Suru valley areas in the west (Kargil being the second most important town in Ladakh). Historically populated by the Ladakhi people, continued immigration and preferential treatment to Kashmiris by the Jammu and Kashmir government have led to demographic changes in the Ladakh region.

The Baltistan and Skardu area, under Pakistani rule and entirely Muslim, used to be included in what is geographically referred to as Ladakh. Before partition, Baltistan was one of the districts of Ladakh. Skardu was the winter capital of Ladakh while Leh was the summer capital. People of Baltistan and Ladakh speak very similar languages closely related to Tibetan.

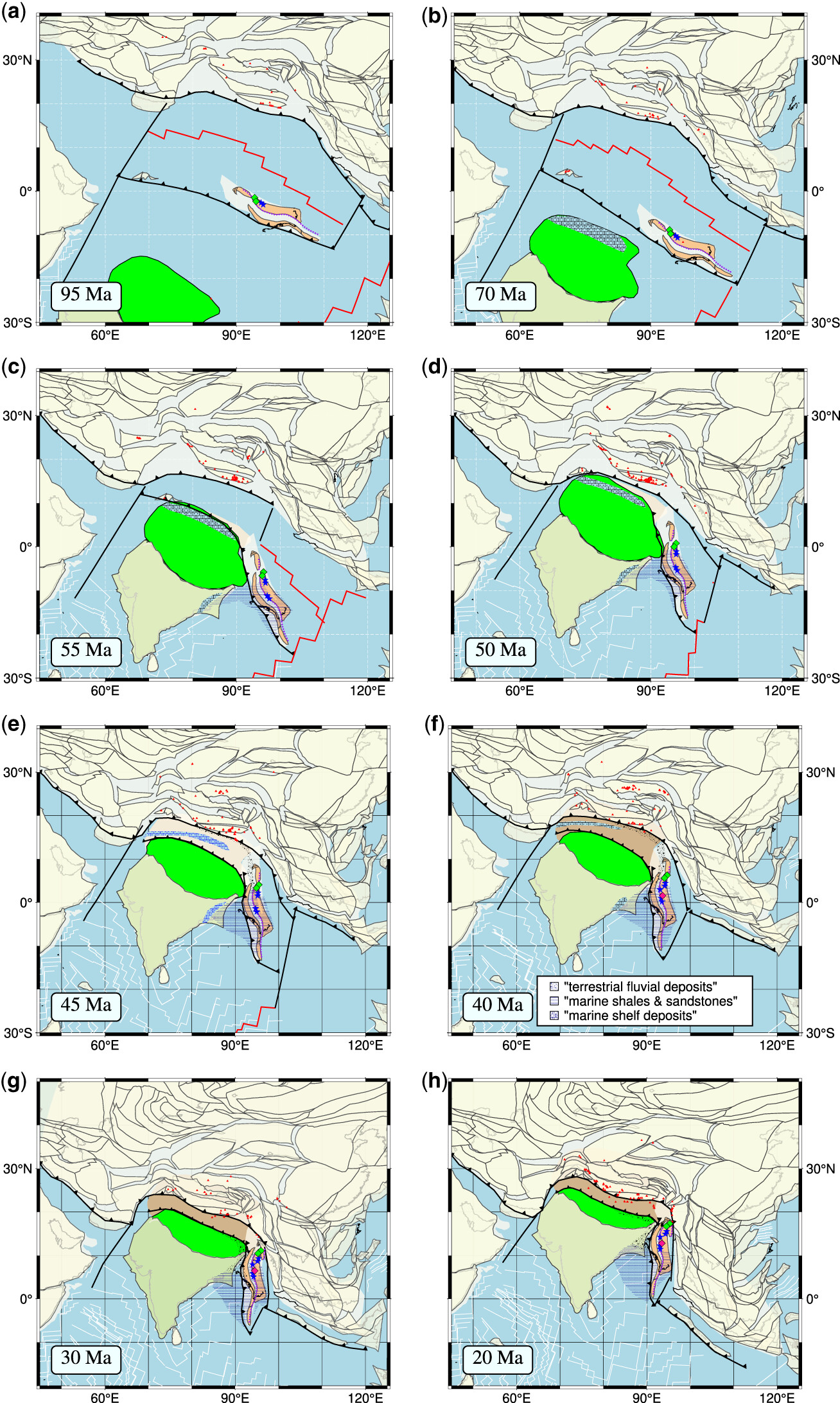
Diagram showing collision of the Indian subcontinent with Asia to form the Himalayas. The area in green represents the now subducted "Greater India"

Naked barley, normal barley and wheat are the staple crops all over Ladakh, along with mustard (for oil), lentils and other pulses, and vegetables. The extreme limit of cultivation is at Korzok near the Tso Moriri lake, at 4560 m, said to be among the highest fields in the world.

== Mountain ranges and plateau ==
The mountain ranges in this region were formed over a period of 45 million years by the folding of the Indian Plate into the stationary landmass of Asia. The Himalayas were formed from the base material of the Indian plate.

From north to south mountain ranges are Karakoram Range, Ladakh Range, Zanskar Range and Great Himalayas range. Plateaus are Depsang Plains north of Karakoram Range, "Lingzi Thang plains" southeast of Depsang Plains and north of Kongka La.

- Mountain ranges are (from north to south, then east to west):
  - Karakoram Range: two important sub-ranges are the Changchenmo Range and the Pangong Range as below.
    - Changchenmo Range - a subrange of Karakoram Range
      - Passes
        - Karakoram Pass
        - Marsimik La
      - Hotsprings
        - Hot Springs, Chang Chenmo Valley on LAC
        - Gogra Hot Springs, Changlung Valley also in Chang Chenmo Valley on LAC.
        - Jianan Pass – a border pass in the Kugrang Valley tributary of Changchenmo is sometimes called "Hot Springs" .
    - Pangong Range, a subrange of Karakoram Range, runs from Chushul along southern shore of Panggong Tso on India-China LAC.
      - Features
        - Fingers, has Dhan Singh Thapa Post on northern bank of Pangong Tso on the slope of one of fingers.
        - Khurnak Fort on north bank of Pangong Tso
        - Harong peak
        - Mumkun peak on south bank of Pangong Tso
        - Laban peak
        - Matung Nyungtsa
        - Dage peak
        - Rechihlong
        - Bapi peak.
        - Merag peak
        - Kangju Kangri peak
      - Passes
        - Rezang La
        - Kongta La pass.
      - Lakes
        - Pangong Tso
        - Spanggur Tso
  - Kailash Range (Gangdise Shan range): on the southern bank of Pangong Tso begins from Lukung, runs eastward via Thakung Heights, Helmet Top, Phursook Bay, till India-claimed-LAC at Bangong Co.
    - Features
      - Helmet Top
      - Black Top
      - Gurung Hill
      - Spanggur Gap
      - Mount Sajum
    - Passes
      - Rezang La
      - Rechin La
      - Rezang La II
      - Chang La pass, northeast of Skakjung pasture & Dumchele village
    - Rivers
      - Kigunaru River- the right bank tributary of Indus River
    - Pastures
      - Skakjung pasture in western part of Demchok sector and China-administered India-claimed Dumchele border trading village lies in this pasture.
  - Ladakh Range
    - Panamik hot springs, near Sasoma enroute Siachen.
    - Passes
      - Yarab Tso lake in Nubra Valley.
      - Yaya Tso on "Chumathang-Chushul Road".
      - Mirpal Tso on "Chumathang-Chushul Road".

  - Koyul Ridge, from Dungti-Fukche-Koyul Ridge to Demchok on right bank of Indus along Chushul-Dungti-Fukche-Demchok highway (CDFD road).
  - Zanskar Range
  - List of mountain peaks of Ladakh

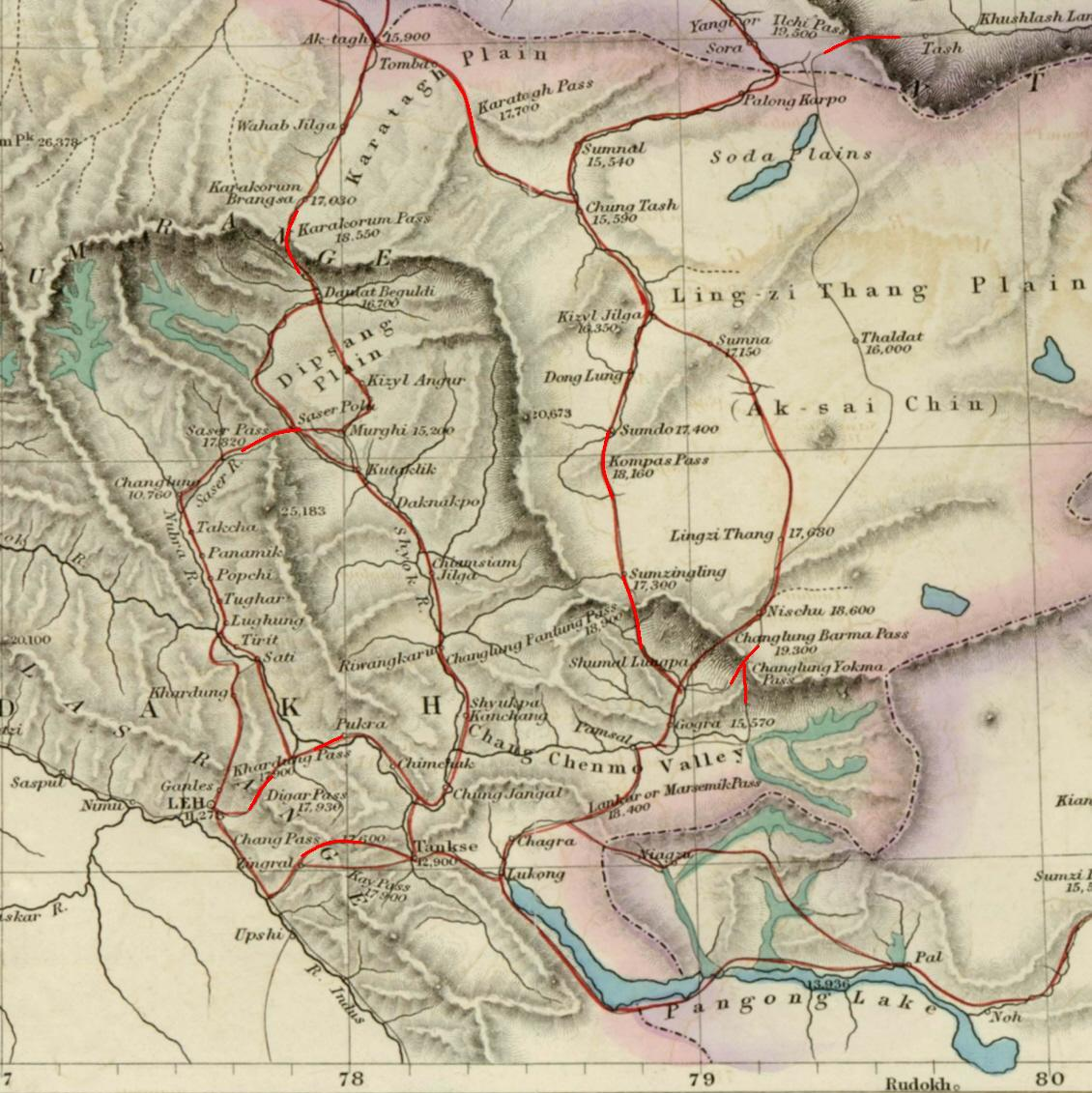
Various routes (red), mountain passes, and plateaus (plains). Karakoram Plains (Depsang Plains), Soda Plains, & Ling Thang Plains in Aksai Chin.

- Plateaus are (north to south):
  - Aksai Chin, see List of locations in Aksai Chin.
    - Depsang Plains (Karakoram Plains), north of Karakoram range.
      - Daulat Beg Oldie
      - Depsang Bulge
    - Lingzi Thang Plains, southeast of Depsang plains & north of Kongka La.
      - Tso Tang
    - Soda Plains, east of Depsang plains & north of Lingzi Thang Plains.
  - Changthang plateau
    - Rong Valley
      - Chumathang hot springs on "Upshi-Nyoma Road".
    - Rupshu plateau - subsection of Changthang plateau
      - Puga Valley
        - Puga hot springs east of Tso Kar lake on ‘Meroo-Tso Kar-Mahe’ road.
      - Salt Valley and its lakes
        - Kyago Tso (Kyagar Tso)
        - Tso Moriri
      - More Plains pool
        - Tso Kar
        - Startsapuk Tso,
      - Kyago Tso
      - Ryul Tso

=== Ladakh range ===
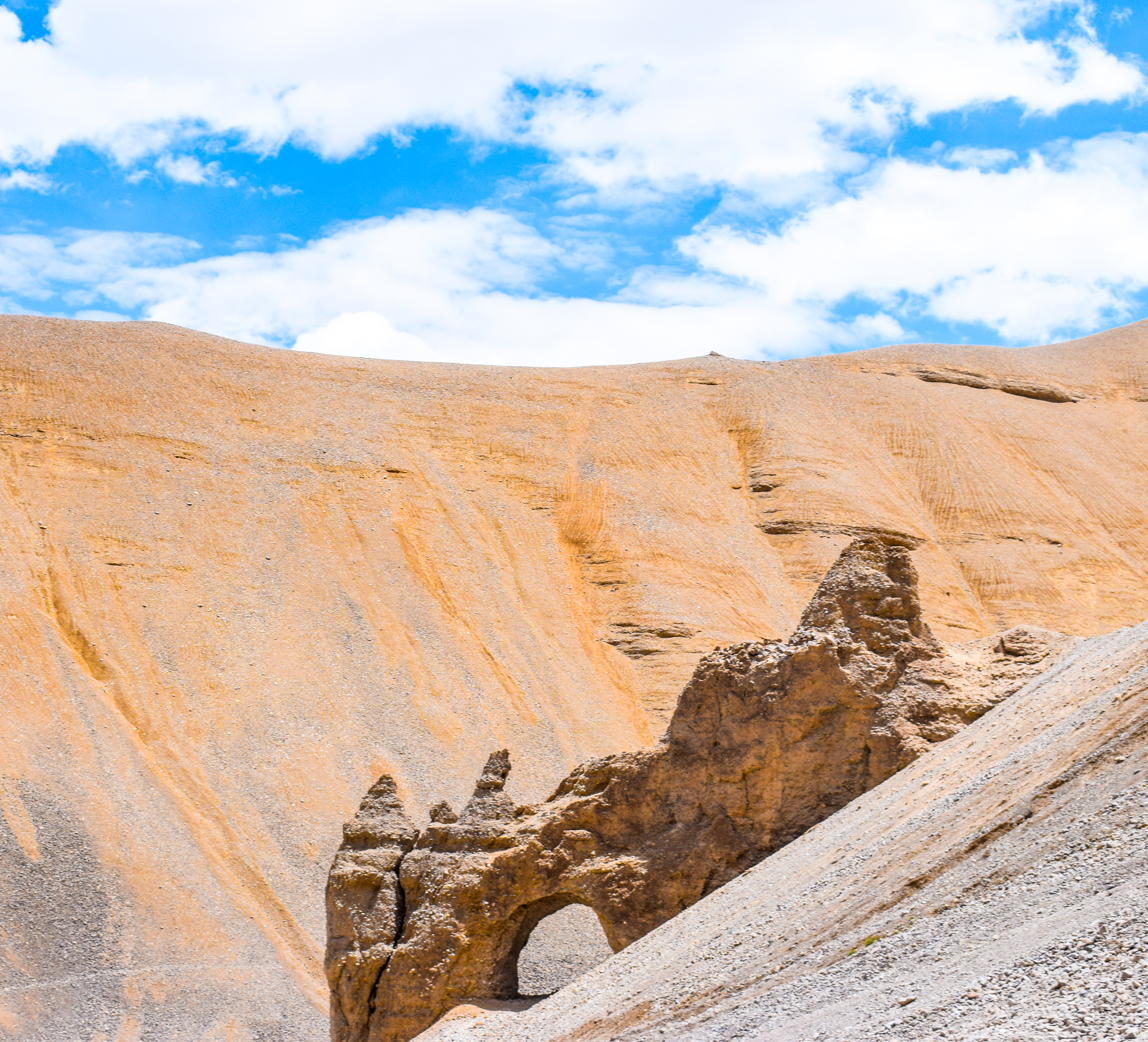
Sedimentary rock formations in Ladakh

The Ladakh Range has no major peaks; its average height is a little less than 6000 metres, and few of its passes are less than 5000 m. Within Ladakh it forms the northern boundary wall of the Indus valley, though when the river enters present-day Indian-controlled Ladakh at Demchok, some 250 km south-east of Leh, it is actually flowing along the foot of the northern flank of these granite mountains, which it crosses by a great gorge close to its confluence with the Hanle River.

The Pangong Range runs parallel to the Ladakh range for some 100 km northwest from Chushul, and extends to the south along the southern shore of the Pangong Lake. It is divided from the main Ladakh range by the Tangtse River. Its highest range is 6700 m, and the northern slopes are heavily glaciated.

A third branch called the Kailash Range issues southeast of the Pangong Range and continues till Mount Kailas in Ngari (in Tibet). It forms the eastern watershed of the Indus River south of Mount Sajum.

=== Zanskar Range ===
The Zanskar Range consists of layers of sediment from the ocean floor, and the Ladakh Range of granite was born of the immense heat generated by the friction between the two plates. In Ladakh, the suture zone between the continental masses runs a little to the south of the Indus Valley. The drift continues and is the cause of the frequent earthquakes in the Himalayan region. Crossing the Himalayas by the dip of the Zoji La, the crest-line of the range remains at a relatively modest level, the highest peaks near the pass being little more than 5000–5500 m above sea level. South-east of Zoji La the scale increases, reaching a climax in the mighty massif of Nun-Kun, with two summits over 7000 m.

== Rivers ==
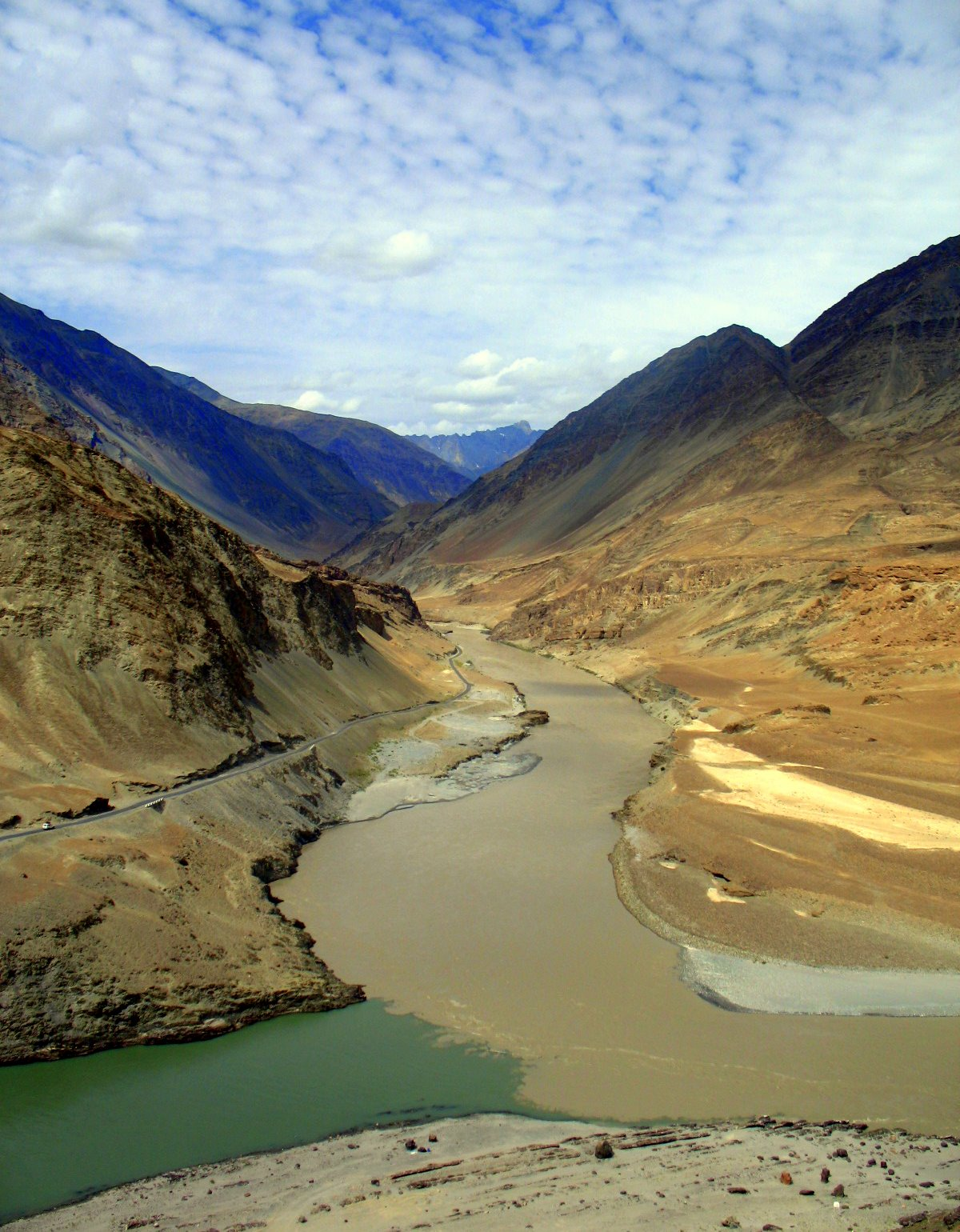
Sindhu Pushkaram, the confluence of Indus river (left) with the silty Zanskar River (top), where the Sindhu Pushkaram Festival is held every 12 years.

The enormous mass of the Himalayas creates a rain shadow, denying entry to the moisture-laden clouds of the Indian monsoon. Ladakh is thus a high altitude desert. The main source of water is the winter snowfall on the mountains. The regions on the north flank of the Himalayas—Dras, the Suru valley and Zanskar—experience heavy snowfall and remain virtually cut off from the rest of the country for several months in the year. Summers are short, although long enough to grow crops. The proportion of oxygen is less than in many other places at a comparable altitude because of lack of vegetation. There is little moisture to temper the effects of rarefied air. Suru and Zanskar valleys form a great trough at the foot of the northern, heavily glaciated flank of the Himalayas, while opposite rise the mountains of the Zanskar Range.

Map-R2: Rivers of Ladakh.

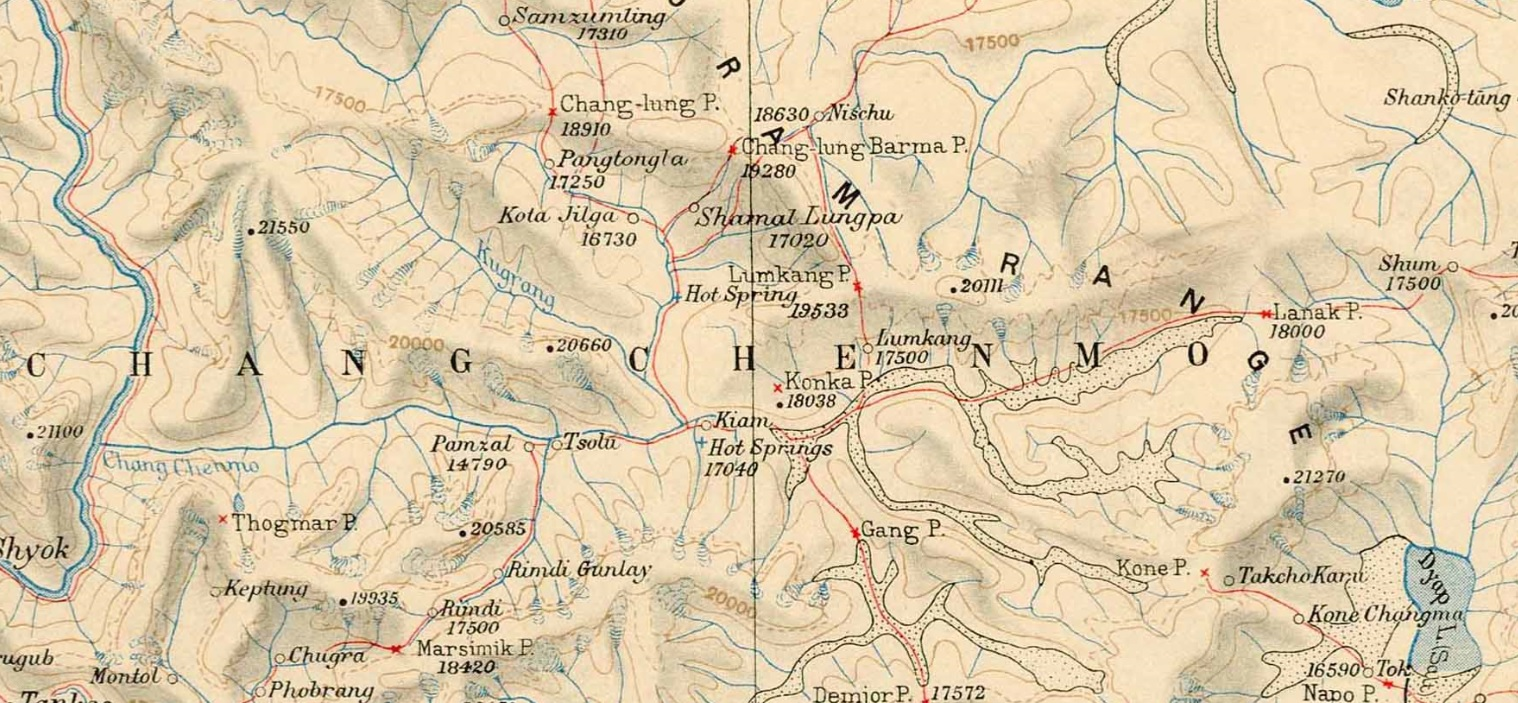
1916 map of the Chang Chenmo Valley and its river system

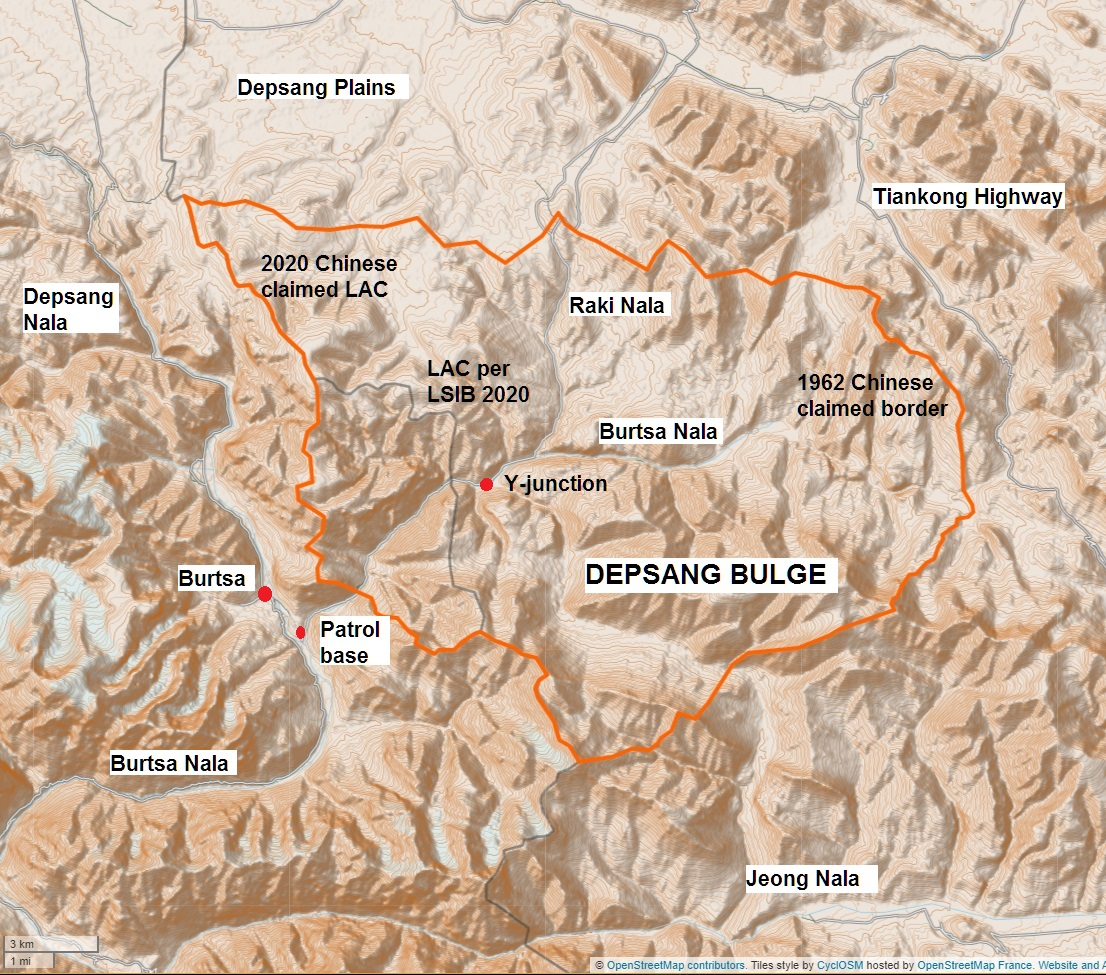
Map of the key streams and other geographical features of the Depsang Bulge area

- Karakash River:
  The Karakash River originates in China-held and India-claimed area of Aksai Chin and flows entirely in China-held area.
- Indus River:
  All of India-held Ladakh lies in the basin of the Indus River. The Indus River is the backbone of Ladakh. All the major places historically and currently such as Shey, Leh, Basgo, and Tingmosgang are situated close to the river. Many places along the course have witnessed the Sino-Indian border dispute. Major tributes of Indus are as follows (from east to west):
  - Charding Nullah:
    In the Demchok sector, the Charding Nullah runs from the Charding La pass in the south to its confluence with the Indus, near Demchok village, at the base of the pyramid-shaped Demchok Karpo (also Demchok Lhari Karpo) peak in the Demchok sector in north. Demchok Hot Spring is near the confluence. Demchok is reachable via 3 routes: Chushul-Dungti-Fukche-Demchok National Highway (CDFD road) through the Changthang Wildlife Sanctuary along the southern bank of the Indus river, Chismule-Koyul-Umling La-Demchok Road (CKUD Road) 86 km long world's highest motorable road from Chismule in Koyul Lungpa river valley to Demchok via the Umling La pass (world's highest motorable pass at 19,300 ft (5,900 m)) connecting Demchok to Koyul & Hanle, Hanle-Fukche-Koyul-Demchok Road (HFKD Road) via Hanle (also see IAO - Indian Astronomical Observatory) & Fukche ALG airstrip.
  - Koyul Lungpa River:
    The Koyul Lungpa river runs from Chang La in south to northwest past Koyul to its confluence with Indus near Fukche ALG on south bank.
  - Hanle River:
    The Hanle River originates near the Imis La pass (5,290m or 17,355 ft high saddle, south of Ukdungle Indian Military base, Zarsar & Tradole peak) on the India-Tibet border and joins the Indus river near Nowi and Loma north of Hanle River close to the town of Nyoma.
  - Shyok River:
    The Shyok River originates in the vicinity of the Karakoram Pass, which is located north of Daulat Beg Oldi (DBO). From its source to its confluence with the Chang Chenmo River (and including this river), it collects four important tributaries. Each of these tributaries originates in the Chinese-administered disputed Aksai Chin region and empties in the Indian-administered area. These four tributaries are, from upstream (north) to downstream (south): the Chip Chap River, the Jeong Nala, the Galwan River and the Chang Chenmo River. Further downstream, the Shyok River confluences with the Tangtse River at Shyok village, then with Nubra River near Diskit, and finally falls into the Indus River in Chorbat Valley in Pakistan held area. The tributaries of the Shyok River include:
    - Chip Chap River:
      The Chip Chap River originates in Karakoram range by collecting streams north and east of Tianwendian in China-held part of Aksai Chin. It joins Shyok river near Darbuk–Shyok–DBO Road (DS-DBO Road/DSDBO Road). Its tributaries are:
      - Lungnak Lungpa stream:
        The Lungnak Lungpa stream flows northeast to southwest and joins north bank of Chip Chap River near LAC.
      - DBO Nala or Chapo Chu:
        The DBO Nala stream passes by Daulat Beg Oldi (DBO) and joins the Chip Chap River in the Indian-controlled area of the Depsang Plains.
    - Jeong Nala, also known as Jiwan Nala, Nacho Chu, Xidagou or Xida Gou:
      The Jeong Nala originates at the eastern edge of the Karakoram Range, in Chinese-administered Aksai Chin, and flows westwards into Indian-administered Ladakh, just south of the Depsang Bulge. It is joined by the Burtsa Nala a few kilometres before it empties into the Shyok River, near Sultan Chushku in Ladakh. Its main tributary is:
      - Burtsa Nala, also known as Tiannan River:
        The Burtsa Nala originates in the Depsang Bulge in Chinese-administered Aksai Chin and flows westwards into Indian-administered Ladakh, where it joins the Jeong Nala. Its main tributary is the Depsang Nala.
    - Galwan River:
      The Galwan River originates near Samzungling campsite on eastern side of Karakoram range in China-held disputed territory and flows west to join the Shyok River in India-held area 102 km south of DBO. The Galwan River valley is location of bloody 2020–2021 China–India skirmishes.
    - Chang Chenmo River:
      The Chang Chenmo River originates near the Lanak La pass, flows through the Chinese-controlled area of Aksai Chin to the vicinity of the Konka La pass, and then through the Indian-controlled area via Hot Springs and Tsogstsalu, until it joins the Shyok River. Its tributary Kugrang River is held by India, while Kugrang's tributary to the east of Gogra, the Changlung river, is held by China and claimed by India. Gogra, held by India, is a pasture and the confluence of Kugrang and Changlung rivers. Hot Springs (also called Kyam or Kayam) is at the confluence of Kugrang with Chang Chenmo River. Gogra in Kugrang Valley thus forms a key link, connecting the Kugrang valley, Changlung valley and Chang Chenmo.
      - Kugrang River:
        The Kugrang River flows from northwest to southeast within territory held by India, receiving the Changlung River tributary at Gogra and then continuing further south to fall into the Chang Chenmo River near Hot Springs.
        - Changlung River:
          The Changlung River flows from north to southwest in China-held disputed territory, then ends into Kugrang River near the Gogra pasture held by India.
    - Tangtse River, also known as Shyok Gang or Durbuk Stream:
      The Tangtse River flows from east to west from the village of Tangtse to its confluence with the Shyok River, near the village of Shyok. At Tangtse, it is formed by the confluence of a stream originating in the north-western vicinity of Pangong Tso and a stream originating in the south of the Pangong Range.
    - Nubra River:
      The Nubra River runs from Siachen Glacier near Siachen Base Camp, via Panamik & Sasoma (starting point of Sasoma–Saser La Road to DBO in Depsang Plains), to its confluence with Shyok River near Diskit. Although, geographically the area between Diskit to Chalunka is not in Nubra River Valley as it is part of Shyok River itself, culturally it is considered part of the Nubra River Valley as they follow Buddhism. Chalunka to Turtuk (also see Battle of Turtuk) in India and beyond to Khaplu in Pakistan-administered Gilgit-Baltistan is called Chorbat Valley which is inhabited by the Balti-speaking Shia Muslims.
  - Zanskar River:
    3 main tributaries are the Markha north of Padum, Stod (Doda) west of Padum, and the Lungnak (Tsarap Lingti) east of Padum. Zanskar suffers heavy snowfall, and the Pensi La which connects Stod River valley with Suru River valley opens only in June and is blocked again in mid-October. The entire valley is virtually treeless.
    - Markha River:
      tributary of Zanskar River flows Hankar in east to Chilling in west and joins Zanskar River few kilometer south of Nimoo near Chilling & Skyu on Nimmu–Padum–Darcha road (NPDR). Marka River forms the western side of northern boundary of Zanskar range.
    - Stod River:
      (Doda River): west of Padum, Stod originates from Drang-drung glacier of Pensi La and flows northwest to southeast through a broad open valley towards confluence with Lungnak River just east of Padum.
    - Lungnak River:
      flows east to west from Ladakh-Himachal-Tibet tri-junction to Padum. Its main tributaries are Tsarap River & Lingti River.
      - Lingti River:
        Lingti River and another tributary (name ?) confluence with Lungnak River just north of Bara-lacha-la, after which Lungnak River flows past Phugtal Monastery.
      - Kurgiak Cho (Kargyak River):
        descends from Shingo-la near Himachal-Ladakh-J&K tri-junction, flows south to northeast to confluences with Lungnak River near Gombo Rangjun (Gonbo Rangjon).
      - Tsarap River:
        Lies north of Lungnak River & Kargyak River, west of "Leh-Manali Highway", and east and north of Padum. It flows east to west till Tsarap River is Lungnak River's one of the main tributaries.
  - Aryan Valley near Batalik:
    The Aryan Valley, situated between Khaltsi and Batalik on the banks of the Indus River, has an average altitude of 2700 meters. The valley's lower elevation, fertile soil, and warmer climate compared to Leh allow it to grow fruits like apricots, mulberries, grapes, and walnuts. It comprises four villages: Dah, Hanu, Garkhun, and Darchik. Dah and Hanu are in Leh district, while Garkhun and Darchik are in Kargil district. These villages are located near the Line of Control (LOC). Dah Valley and Hanu village have an upstream valley around the Indus, where streams join the Indus River. The valley is inhabited by the unique and culturally rich Brokpa people.
  - Suru River:
    Pensi La (4400 metres) near Rangdum Monastery connects the Suru Valley in north with Stod River valley and Padum in Zanskar Valley in south. The Suru River originates from area northwest of Padum and flow past Sankoo southwest to northeast to Kargil, after receiving the combined waters of the Dras and Shingo Rivers a short distance north of Kargil it confluences with the Indus at Marol in Baltistan in PoK. Saru River forms the western boundary of the Zanskar range. Although Rangdum Monastery & Zulidok villages, both northeast of Pensi La, are in Suru River Valley, culturally they are considered part of Zanskar Valley (Stod Valley). Suru Valley is also the destination of the nomadic Bakarwal herdsmen who trek up every summer from the Jammu region.
    - Sankoo Stream:
      flows east to west from Itchu via Sangroh to join Suru River at Sankoo.
    - Dras River:
      a downstream tributary of Suru River which confluences at Kaksar (Kakshar, west of Kargil town) in India near LAC.
      - Shingo River:
        tributary of Dras River. Originates and flows through PoK Gilgit-Baltistan and enters Kargil district in India where it joins the Dras River.

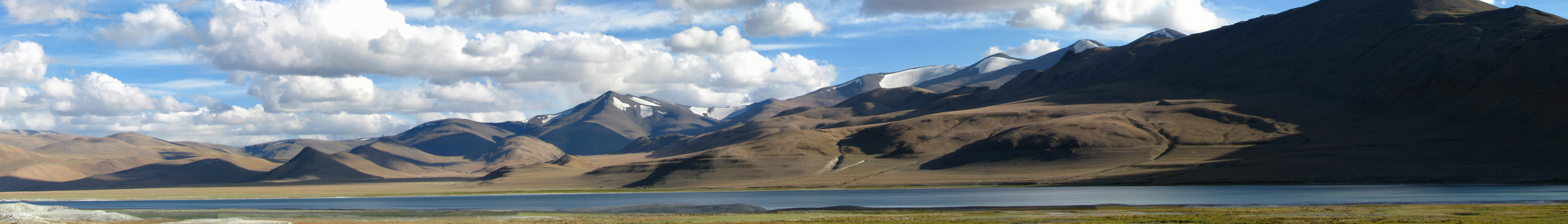
The deep blue Tso Kar (lake) in eastern Ladakh

== Gallery ==
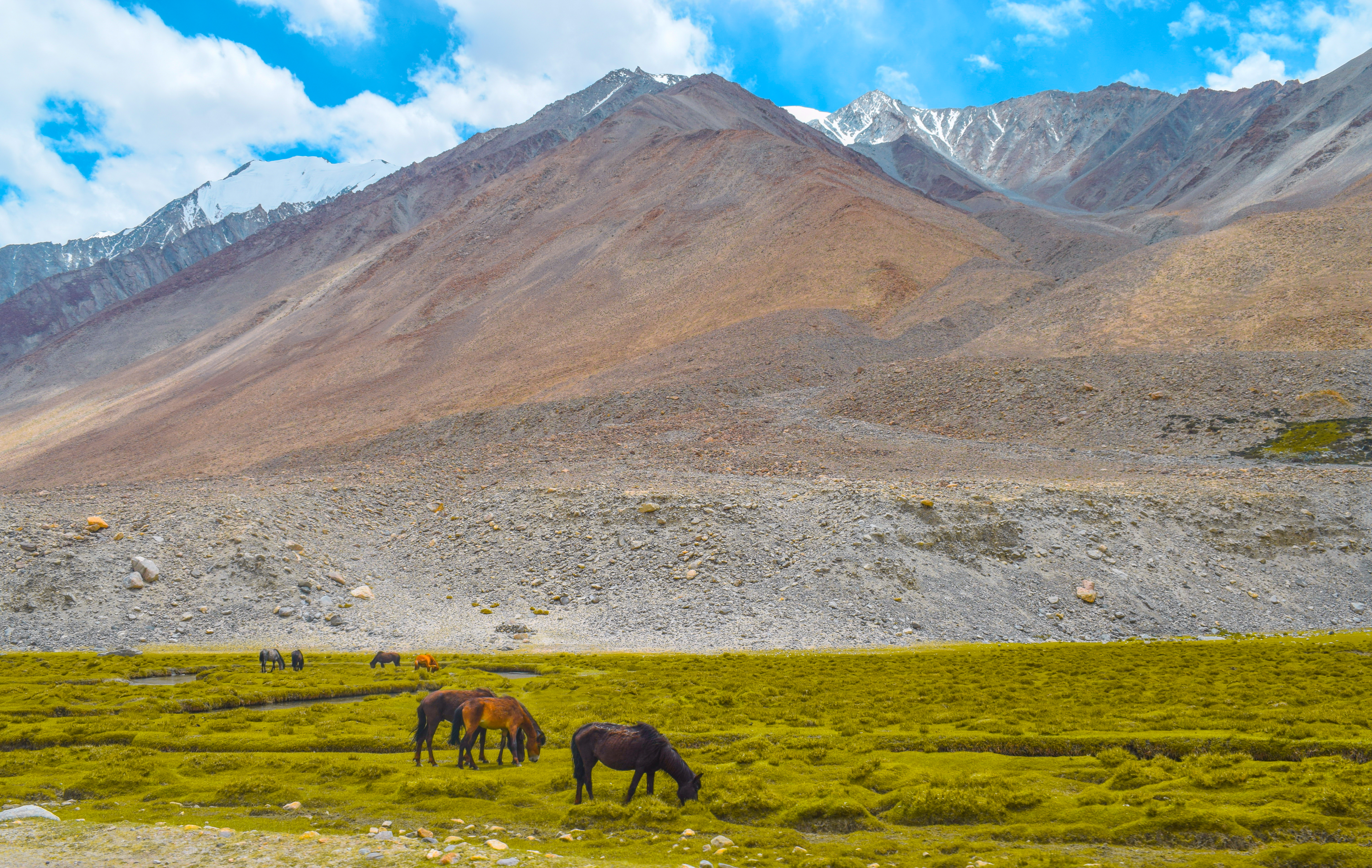
Landscape in Ladakh, near Pangong Tso

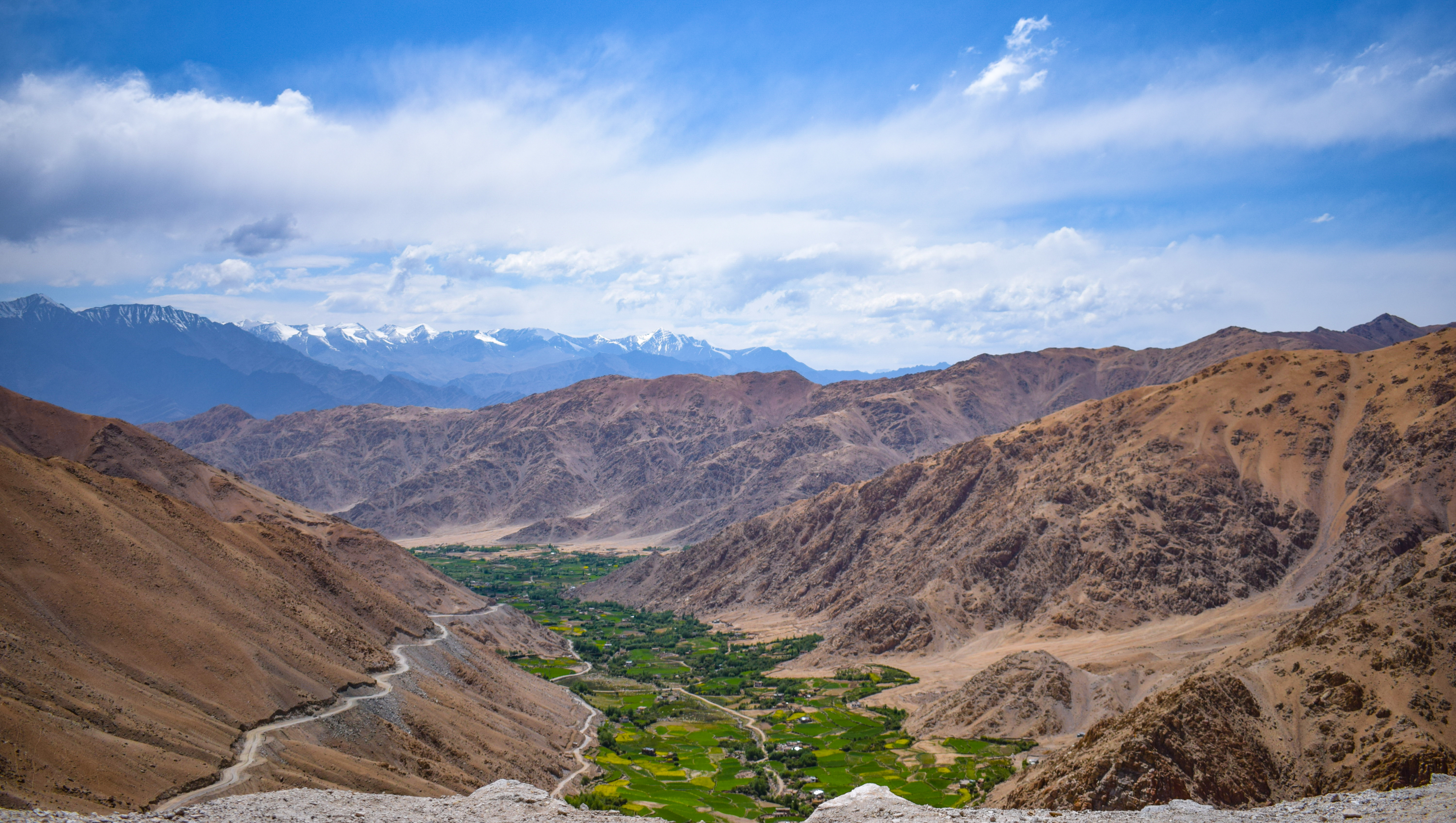
View from Chang La Pass

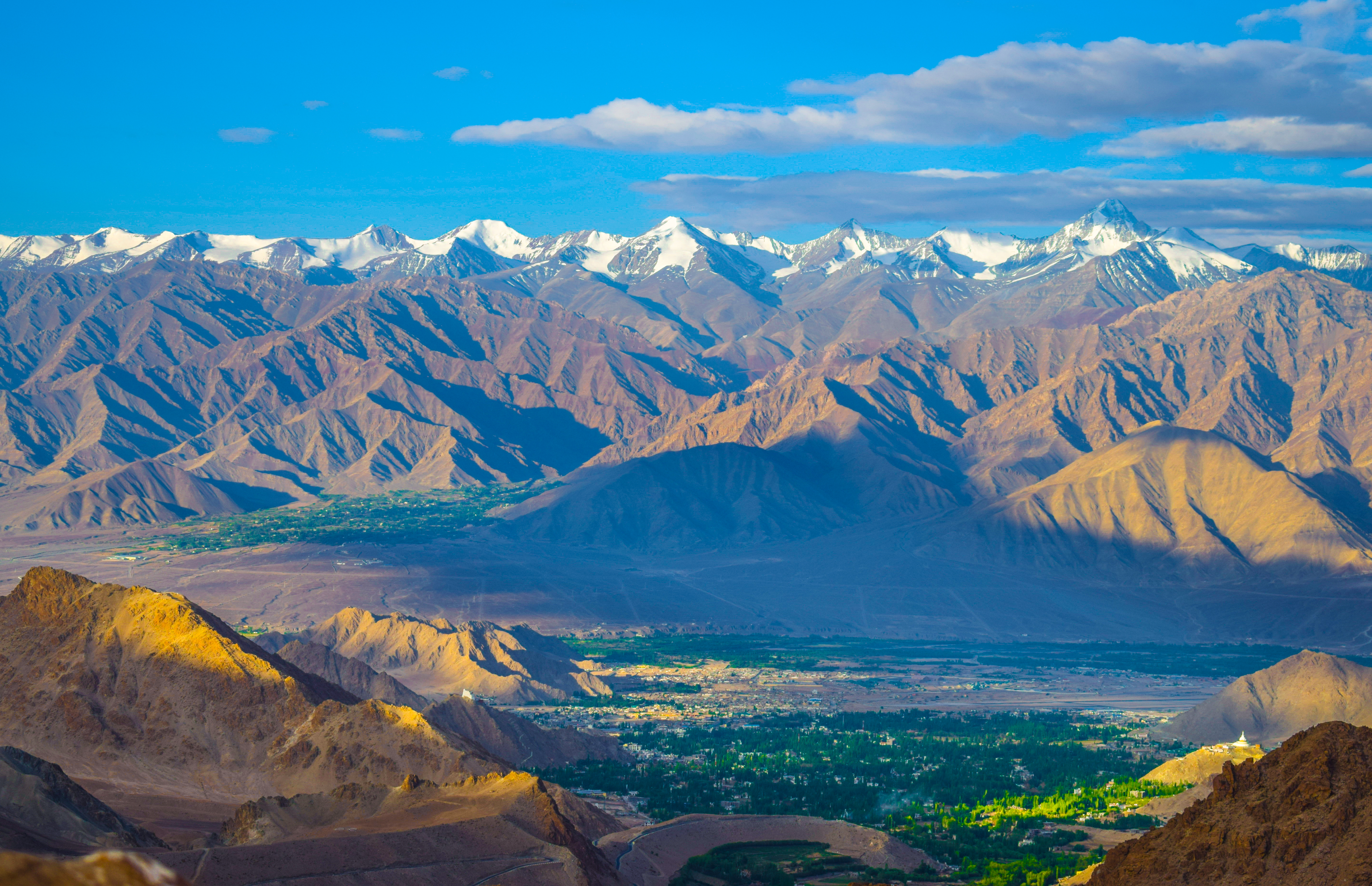
View of Leh from Khardung La Road

== See also ==
- Geography of Himalayas
- Geography of Tibet
- Geology of the Himalaya
- Indus-Yarlung suture zone
- List of districts of Ladakh
- Siachen Glacier
- Tourism in Ladakh
