= Depsang standoff =

Military standoff in Aksai Chin between China and India

- Part of China–India relations
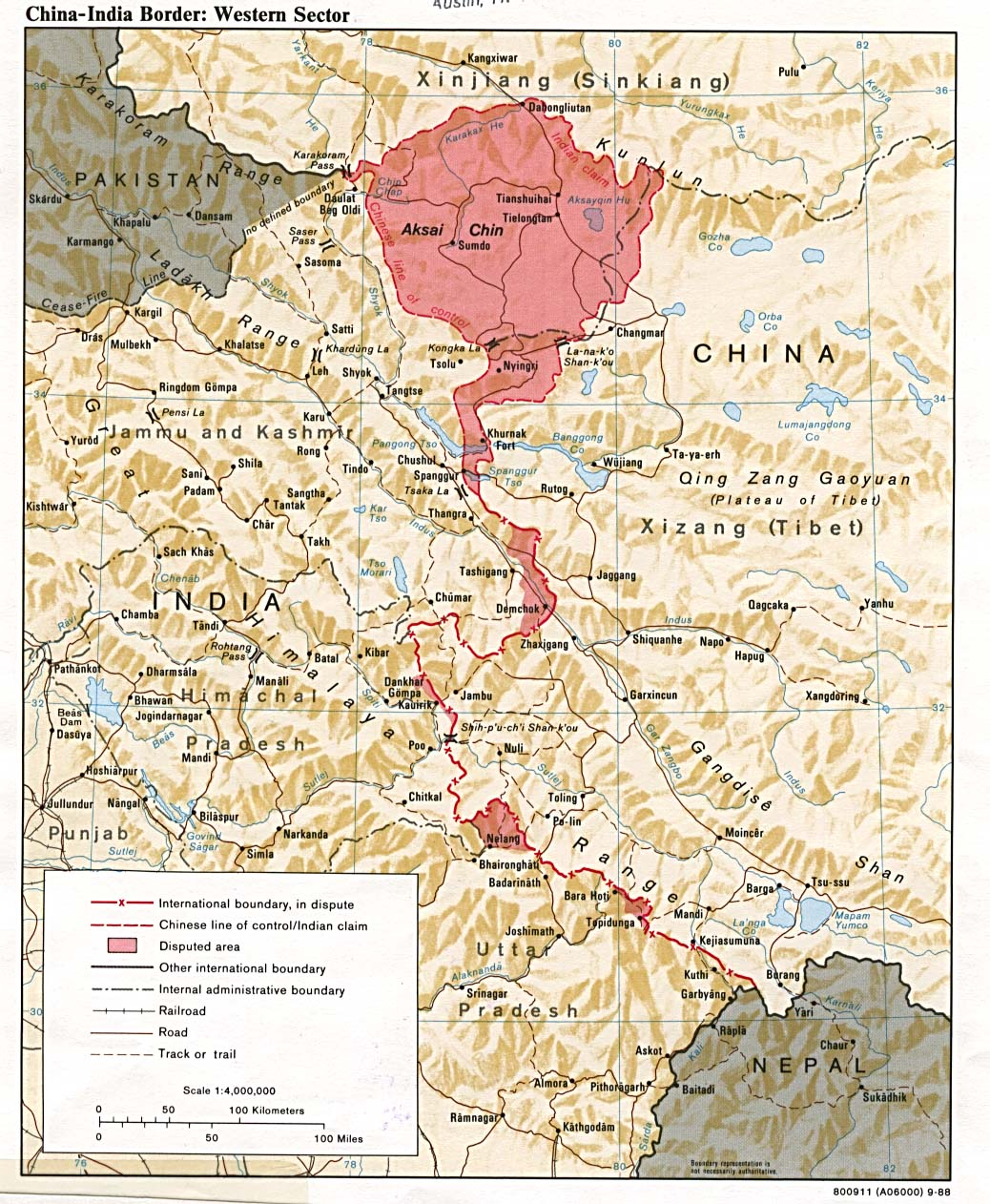
- 1988 CIA map of the Line of Actual Control (LAC)
| Date | 15 April – 5 May 2013 |
| Location | Burtsa Nala Valley (天南河谷; 'Tiannan River Valley'), China–India LAC, Ladakh–Aksai Chin 35°09′23″N 78°07′53″E |
| Result | Chinese withdrawal |

Commandeers and Belligerents
| India Indian Army | China People's Liberation Army Ground Force |

Commanders and leaders
| Manmohan Singh; General Bikram Singh, IA | Xi Jinping; General Chen Bingde, PLA |

Units involved
| Northern Command | Lanzhou MR |

Casualties and losses
| None | None |

The Depsang standoff, also called Depsang incursion, or Daulat Beg Oldi incident, (Note: The Indian media named the event after the better known Daulat Beg Oldi instead of Depsang Plains or Depsang Bulge, even though the location was the latter.) was an incursion and sit-in by a platoon-sized contingent of the Chinese PLA in the dry river bed of Raki Nala, in the Depsang Bulge area, 30 km south of Daulat Beg Oldi near the Line of Actual Control (LAC) in the disputed Aksai Chin region.

Indian forces responded to the Chinese presence by quickly establishing their own encampment 300 metres (980 ft) away. Negotiations between China and India lasted nearly three weeks, during which the Chinese position was supplied by trucks and supported by helicopters. The dispute was resolved on 5 May with Chinese withdrawal. As part of the resolution, the Indian military agreed to refrain from constructing bunkers 250 km away in the Chumar sector, which the Chinese perceived as threatening.

== Background ==
The territorial incident occurred within a 38,000 square kilometre area of disputed territory between India and China, Aksai Chin. The Chinese claim that this area is part of Xinjiang, while the Indians believe that this area is part of Jammu and Kashmir. China and India signed two agreements, in 1993 and 1996, in order to establish protocols to resolve potential disputes in the region. These protocols included the mutual recognition of a "Line of Actual Control" (LAC), but disagreements continue between the two governments about where the LAC lies over a roughly 20 km-wide swath in this sector. Indian media first said that the Chinese encampment was 10 km on their side of where they view the LAC, later revising that to 19 km. Despite the disputed area being an "unpopulated and desolate wasteland", it is believed to be strategically important to China because of the presence of a highway. (Note: There was significant speculation in the Indian media as to the identity of the "highway" mentioned by their sources. It was most likely a reference to the Tiankong Highway, linking China's Tianwendian and Kongka Pass outposts. It was constructed during 2010–2012, immediately prior to the standoff, and runs next to the Depsang Bulge area. See map.) Since the late 1980s, border disputes between India and China have successfully been resolved through diplomacy.

After large-scale Chinese infrastructure improvements adjacent to the region, the Indian army began to develop the infrastructure on their side in the 2000s, which was perceived by the Chinese military as a potential threat. The Indian government claims that Chinese troops continue to illegally enter the area hundreds of times every year. Most of these occur without incident, but in 2011 Chinese military forces entered 18 km into the disputed area in order to dismantle "17 structures made up of loose stones in the shape of bunkers".

== Incident ==
=== Military deployments ===
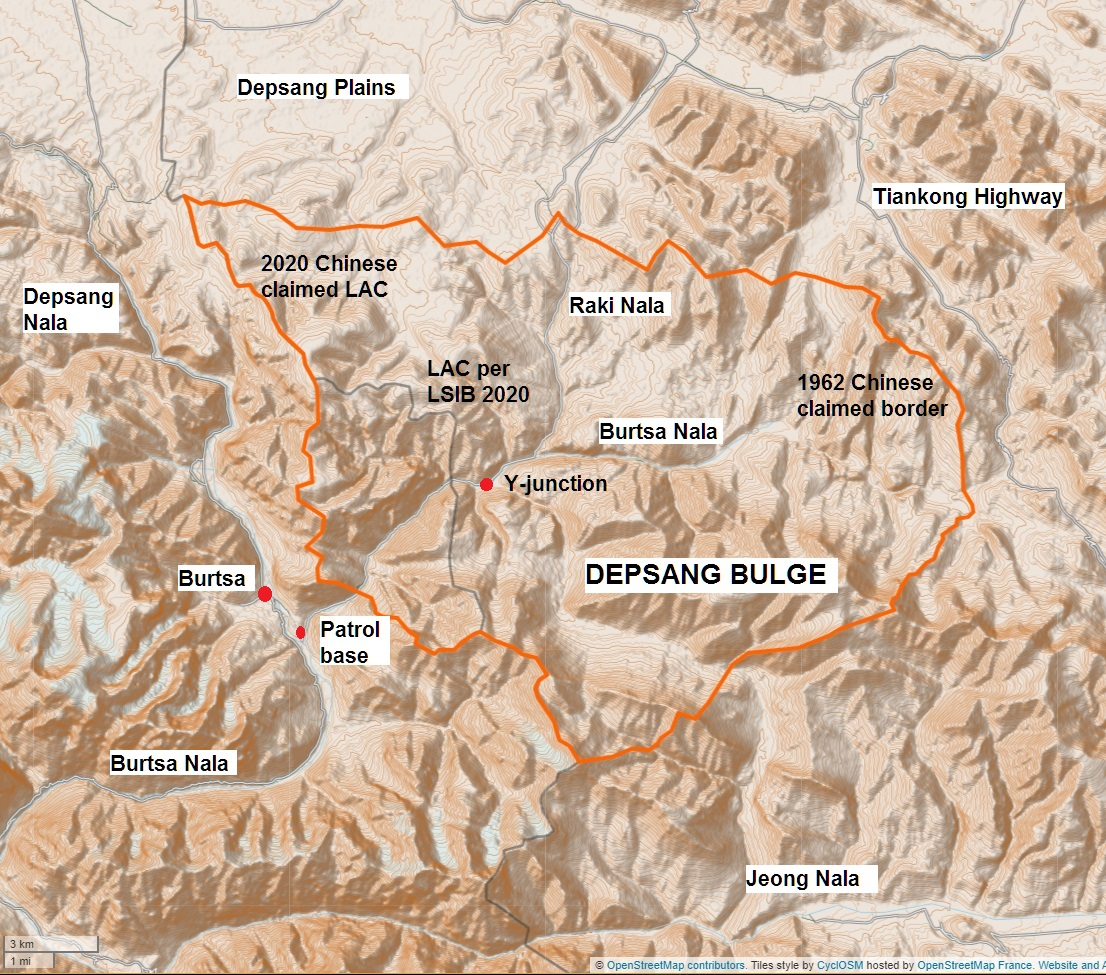
The Depsang Bulge area, Indian territory that was partly occupied by China during the 1962 war; the location of the standoff is at the confluence of the Raki Nala with Burtsa Nala.

During the night of 15 April 2013, a platoon of 50 Chinese troops established an encampment in four tents in the dry river bed of Raki Nala in the Depsang Bulge, which represents the valley of Burtsa Nala or Tiannan River (Chinese: 天南河; pinyin: Tiān nán hé). The encampment was discovered the next day by the Indo-Tibetan Border Police, who then set up an encampment of their own consisting of eight tents 300 meters away from the Chinese. The Chinese force was supplied by trucks and supported by helicopters. The Indian government considered this the most serious border incident in years.

The Indian military followed a policy of restraint, attempting to keep the issue "localized" and "tactical", in order to give the Indian government the opportunity to resolve the issue through diplomacy. Throughout the incident no shots were fired and the Indian military did not attempt to outflank the Chinese. Minimal efforts were made by the Indian army to reinforce the position after its initial deployment, though the two sides did raise banners encouraging each other to withdraw. Much of the negotiations were conducted between officers present in the two camps. Western media largely interpreted China's actions as a show of force by the Chinese military, but some journalists speculated that the incident was possibly conducted by the Chinese military as a way to protest the perceived existence of a "permanent facility" that the Indian army had built in a disputed area. China's military think tank later tried to suggest that the incident was "accidental" and "not deliberately staged".

=== Resolution ===
The Indian government protested diplomatically, asking the Chinese to withdraw their military and to recognise the status quo that existed before the incident. The Chinese responded by publicly denying that there was any border issue, stating that their forces did not cross what they perceived the LAC to be.

On April 27, Prime Minister Manmohan Singh told that, "We do have a plan. We do not want to accentuate the situation. We do believe that it is possible to resolve this problem. It is a localised problem. I think the talks are going on." India opted not to take military action and pressed on with a long-planned visit to China by its foreign minister, Salman Khurshid. Within the Indian Parliament, the government was heavily criticised by the opposition for its handling of the incident who compared it to India's defeat in the 1962 Sino-Indian War. On 3 May, shortly before the dispute was resolved, the Indian parliament was adjourned after opposition members became disruptive, shouting "get China out, save the country". The negotiations lasted nearly twenty days, during which the Chinese military increased their presence in the region. To resolve the issue, India agreed to a Chinese demand to demolish some live-in bunkers in the Chumar sector, 250 km to the south, and refrain from building more bunkers which the Chinese perceived as threatening. Other Chinese demands included the demolition of Indian listening and observation posts built along the border, and an end to the undocumented passage of nomadic shepherds into the Chinese side, but it was not clear to what degree India agreed to these demands. Following the resolution of the dispute, the Chinese military withdrew. The standoff ended on 5 May.

The Chinese military in July 2014 acknowledged the incursion at the Depsang Valley in Ladakh region and said that such incidents occurred due to differing perceptions of the Line of Actual Control.

== See also ==
- Arunachal Pradesh
- China–India relations
- Sino-Indian border dispute
- 2020–2021 China–India skirmishes

== Bibliography ==
- Nyachu, Deldan Kunzes Angmo (July–December 2013), "The Depsang Standoff at the India-China Border along the LAC: View from Ladakh", Himalayan and Central Asian Studies, 17 (3/4), ProQuest 1470421272
- Saint-Mézard, Isabelle (2013), "The Border Incident of Spring 2013 : Interpreting China-India Relations", Hérodote, 150 (3): 132–149, doi:10.3917/her.150.0132
