= Depsang Bulge =

Disputed area between China and India in Aksai Chin

- Location in the Kashmir region
- Coordinates: 35°9′N 78°10′E
- Country: India (claimed); China (controlled)
- Province/Region: Ladakh; Xinjiang
- Established: 1960

Area
  - Total: 900 km^{2} (350 sq mi)

Dimensions
  - Length: 19 km (12 mi)
  - Width: 5 km (3.1 mi)
- Elevation: 5,000 m (16,000 ft)

The Depsang Bulge or Burtsa Bulge is a 900-square-kilometre area of mountain terrain in the disputed Aksai Chin region, which was conceded to India by China in 1960, but has remained under Chinese occupation since the 1962 Sino-Indian War. The area is immediately to the south of the Depsang Plains and encloses the basin of the Burtsa Nala (or Tiannan River, Chinese: 天南河), a stream originating in the Aksai Chin region and flowing west to merge with the Depsang Nala near the village of Burtsa in Ladakh, eventually draining into the Shyok River. The area is perceived to be of strategic importance to both the countries, sandwiched by strategic roads linking border outposts. Since 2013, China has made attempts to push the Line of Actual Control further west into Indian territory, threatening India's strategic road.

== Geography ==
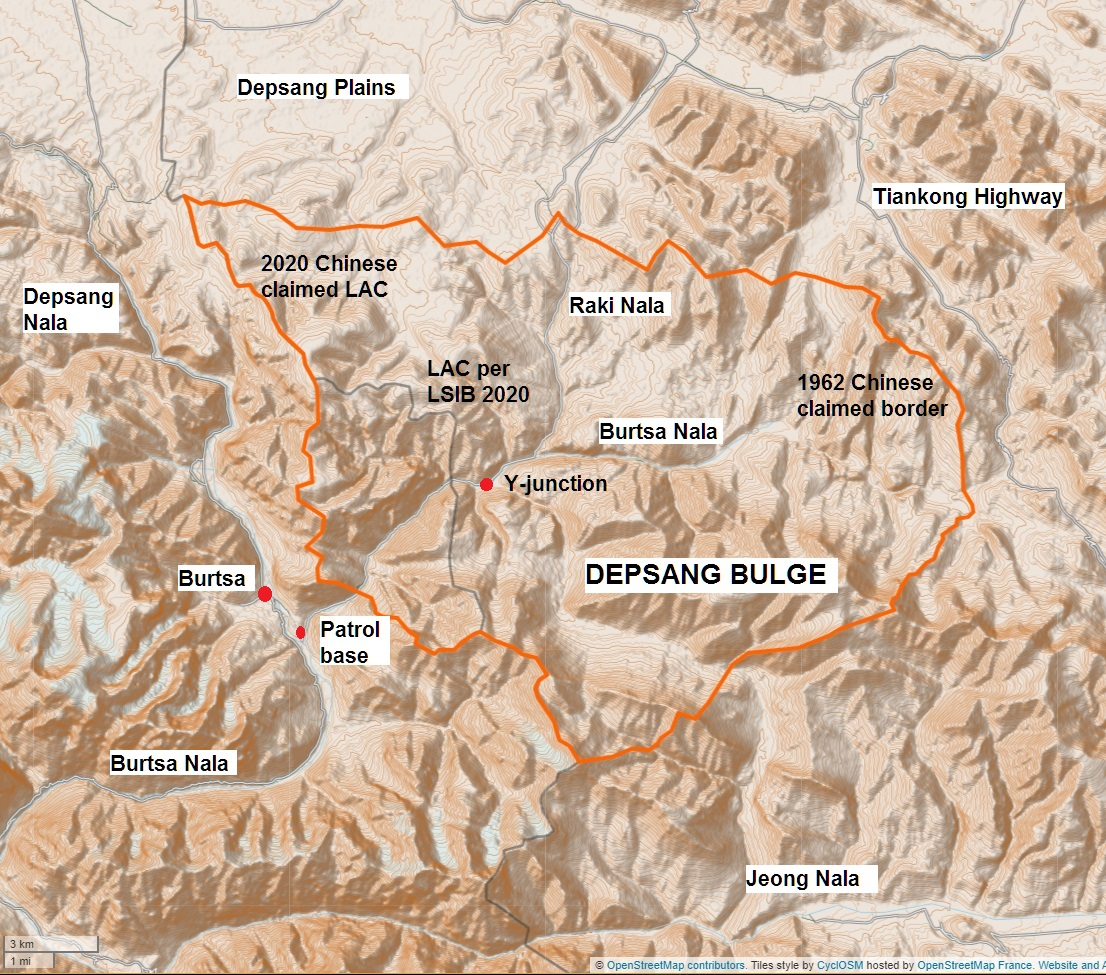
Map 1: The "Depsang Bulge" with China's 1960 claim line to the right and its claim of the "Line of Actual Control" in 2020 to the left. (Note: The Line of Actual Control is that marked by the contributors to the OpenStreetMap as of January 2021, and may not be accurate. Chinese claims get more readily represented on the OpenStreetMap than other countries.)

The Depsang Bulge is immediately to the south of the Depsang Plains. (Note: Contrary to reports in the popular press, the area is not part of the Depsang Plains themselves. It is wholly mountain terrain adjoining the Depsang Plains to the south.) The "bulge", in theoretical Indian territory (had China's 1960 claim line been implemented), encloses the basin of the Burtsa Nala ("Tiannan River" to the Chinese), one of five rivers that drain into the Shyok River after rising in Aksai Chin. (Note: The other rivers of similar disposition are the Chip Chap River, Jeong Nala, Galwan River and the Chang Chenmo River. China's 1956 claim line steered clear of all these rivers except for the Chang Chenmo, which was dissected at the Kongka Pass. The 1960 claim line cut through all of them except the Burtsa Nala.) Near the campsite of Burtsa, a halting place on the traditional caravan route, the Depsang Nala flowing from the north joins the Burtsa Nala. The combined river flows west to join the Murgo Nala near Murgo and eventually drains into the Shyok River. All the streams bring snow-melt water, reaching the highest volume in the afternoons, and diminishing to practically nothing at other times.

The Depsang Bulge contains the basin of the upper course of the Burtsa Nala, to the east of Burtsa and the traditional travel route. Based on various Indian news reports, it would appear that the Depsang Bulge area is over 19 km long east to west and about 5 km wide, giving an area of roughly 900 km^{2}. Burtsa is at an elevation of 4800 metres, the source of Burtsa Nala at 5300 metres, and the surrounding hills rise up to 5500–5600 metres. Just beyond the hills to the south is another nala called the Jeong Nala ("Jiwan Nala" to the Indian military, "Nacho Chu" or "Nao Chu" on older maps), which does not have a "bulge" (Map 2).

Numerous tributary streams from the surrounding hills drain into the Burtsa Nala within the Depsang Bulge. Of particular note are two streams, both joining the main nala near a location called "Y-junction". The northern stream, Raki Nala, flows down from the Depsang Plains and hence, connects the Depsang Bulge to the Depsang Plains. The southern stream connects it to the Jeong Nala valley. Indian troops have traditionally used these two valleys to patrol the periphery of the Depsang Bulge.

== Chinese claim lines ==
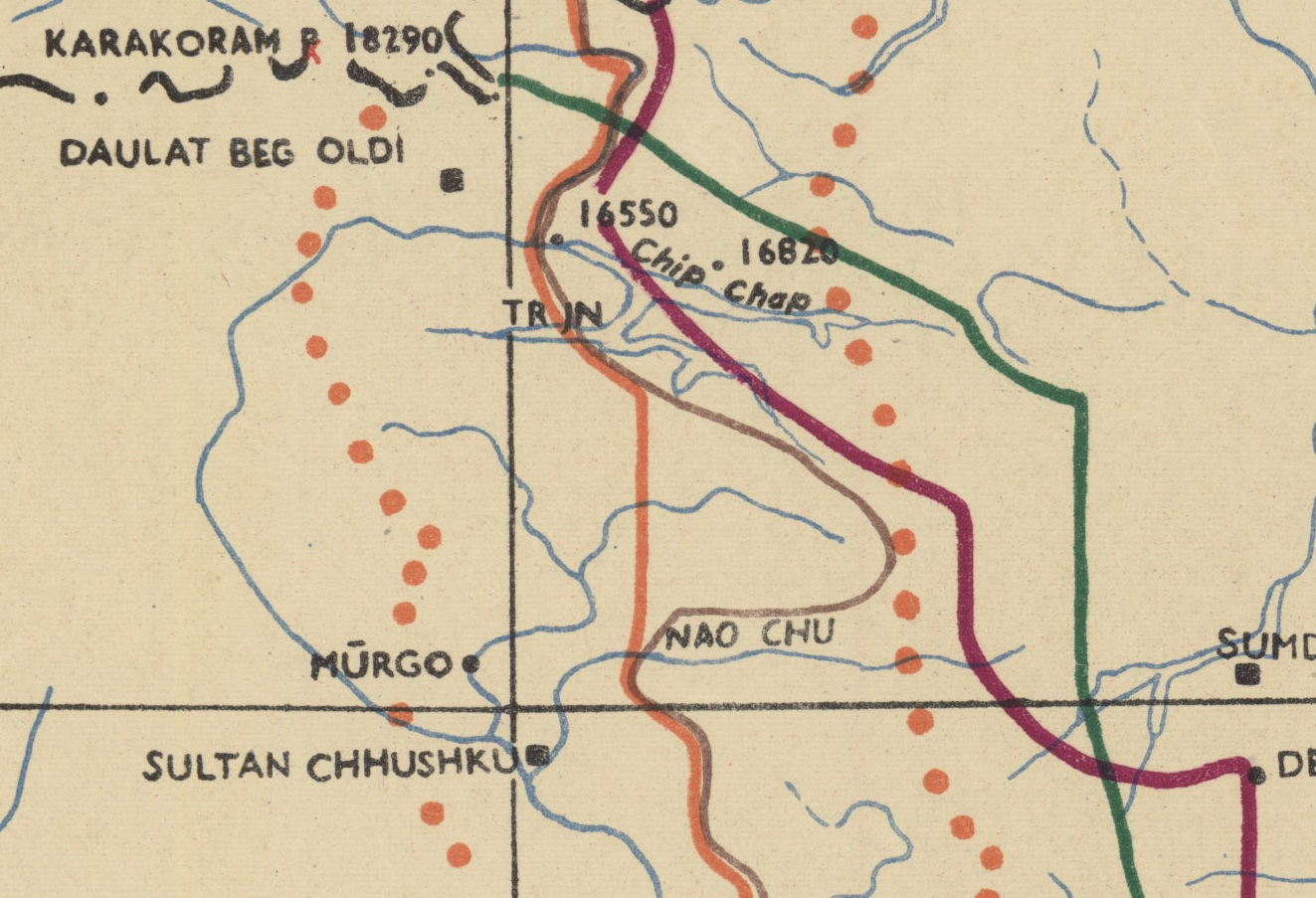
Map 2: Chinese claim lines around the Depsang Bulge: the 1956 claim line in green, the 1960 claim line in dark brown, and the 1962 ceasefire line in orange. (US Army HQ, 1962) (Note: The purple line is the line of separation between the two forces prior to the war, and the dotted lines indicate a 20 km. demilitarisation zone proposed by China after the war.)

The so-called 1956 claim line of China is part of the "Big map of the People's Republic of China", published in 1956. It has special significance in that Chinese premier Zhou Enlai certified it to the Indian premier Jawaharlal Nehru, in a December 1959 letter, as showing the correct boundary of China. The Chinese boundary in this map ran east of all but one of the rivers that drain into the Shyok River. (Note: The one exception is the Chang Chenmo River, where the 1956 claim line ran at the Kongka La pass, midway through its course.) (Map 2, green line)

In June 1960, when the Chinese delegates met the Indian delegates for border discussions, they revealed a new expanded boundary, which has come to be called "the 1960 claim line". This line dissected all the rivers that drained into Shyok, except for the Burtsa Nala. (Map 2, brown line) Why the Burtsa Nala should have been singled out for this special treatment has not been explained. But the resulting "bulge" in the Indian territory around the Burtsa Nala has been dubbed the Depsang Bulge in popular parlance. (Note: Authoritative descriptions of Depsang Bulge are hard to find. But the term is commonly used in news reports.)

== 1962 war ==
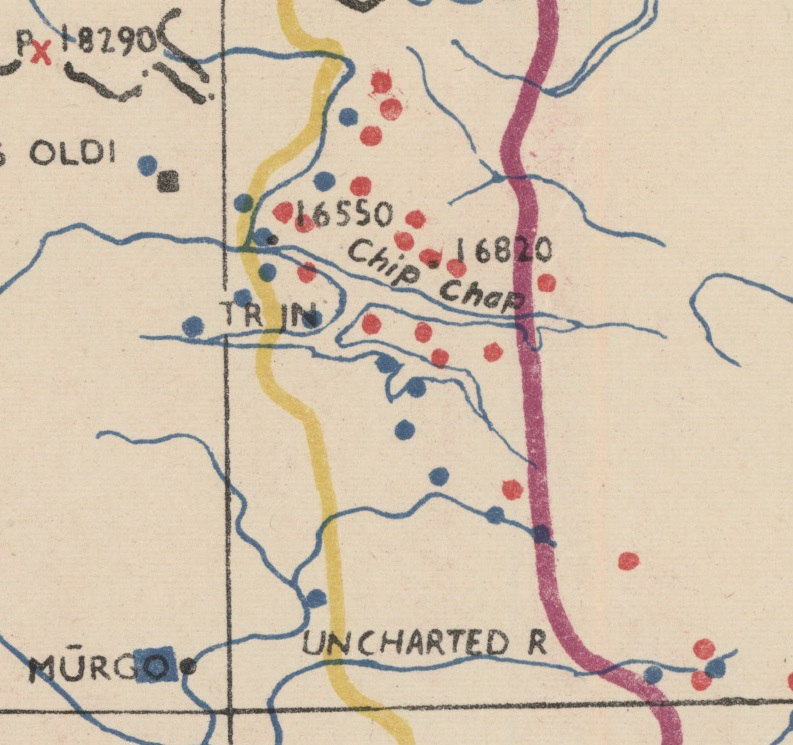
Map 3: 1963 Colombo Proposals map; shows the ceasefire line in orange and the 20-km withdrawal line in purple, along with the Indian (blue) and Chinese (red) posts, prior to the war. (US Army HQ, 1963)

Prior to the 1962 war, the Indian Army had established half a dozen posts on the hills to the north of the Depsang Bulge. These were mostly of platoon to section strength, manned by Jammu and Kashmir Militia (Ladakh Scouts). The Chinese PLA launched its attack on 20 October 1962, with overwhelming strength, a superiority of 10 to 1 in numbers, and eliminated most of them. The remaining posts were recalled to Burtsa and other rear locations. The Chinese forces advanced to their 1960 claim line in most locations.

However, at Depsang Bulge, the Chinese troops advanced further than the 1960 claim line, "straightening out the bulge". (Map 2, orange line, and Map 3, yellow line) Thus, a third line emerged, from the ceasefire line of 1962. More detailed maps of the ceasefire line show a smaller bulge in Indian territory at the mouth of the valley. The US Office of the Geographer's "Large-Scale International Boundaries" (LSIB) dataset shows this boundary (red line in Map 4).

A fourth line was contained in a map attached to a letter written by the Chinese premier Zhou Enlai to heads of certain non-aligned countries (or "African and Asian nations") in the midst of the 1962 war. (Note: The letter was addressed to the heads of governments of Ceylon, Burma, Cambodia, Indonesia, Egypt and Ghana. It was published in a booklet of the Foreign Language Press, but the map is not included in it. Joe Thomas Karackattu has reproduced it in a research paper in 2020. See Fig. 1, p. 592.) A more detailed version of the Chinese map was in fact used by the non-aligned nations in arriving at their Colombo proposals. (Map 3) However the Chinese apparently continue to use their version of the map, which they misleadingly call the "LAC of 1959". It is apparently not drawn to scale. But they interpret the ceasefire line here running very near the confluence of the Depsang Nala with the Burtsa Nala.

The Indian depiction of the ceasefire line, as shown in Maps 2 and 3, is at a considerable distance from the confluence. Indeed, the Indian base at the confluence, Burtsa, is one of the locations where defences continued to be organised even as the clashes subsided. The Indian version of the ceasefire line was supported by the non-aligned countries in their Colombo proposals, (Map 3) as well as the US Government (Map 2).

== 1962–2012 ==
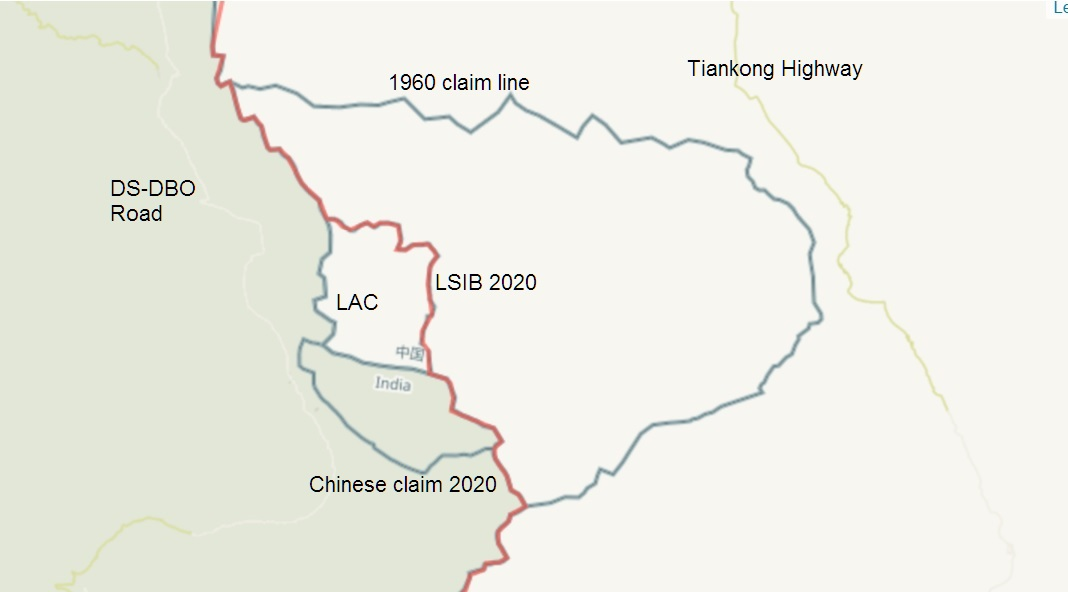
Map 4: Various claim lines for the Depsang Bulge in 2020. The red line is the boundary marked by the US Office of the Geographer in LSIB, (Note: "LSIB" stands for "Large-Scale International Boundaries", a data set published by the US Office of the Geographer and used widely for marking international boundaries, including in applications such as the Google Maps. The data set marked here is of Version 10, released in March 2020, visualised on OpenStreetMap at humdata.org.) which approximates the 1962 ceasefire line. (Note: The lines marked "LAC" as well as "Chinese claim 2020" were different versions of the LAC claimed by China during the 2020 standoff.) The outer bulge marked by the 1960 claim line is estimated to be 900 km^{2}.

After the 1962 war, both India and China were preoccupied with other issues and essentially left the border alone for several decades. By 1976, the Chinese preoccupation with the Tibetan rebels had ended and India also acquired much better information about the border. The Indian Cabinet established a China Study Group to recommend "patrolling limits, rules of engagement, and the pattern of Indian presence" along the border. Consequently, both sides gradually moved up to the line, asserting their presence. The patrols often crisscrossed, and the different perceptions of the LAC became manifest.

Between 2003 and 2008, China embarked on large-scale infrastructure development in the run-up to the Beijing Olympics. Starting in 2010, the Aksai Chin Road (G219) was re-paved at a cost of $476 million. Along with it, numerous improvements to the border infrastructure in Aksai Chin also became visible, increasing the pressure on the LAC. An existing road to the Heweitan military base (roughly at the head of the Jeong Nala) was improved and extended to join the Tianwendian Highway in the north. This new strategic road, labelled "Tiankong Highway", ran immediately next to the Depsang Bulge in the east. (Map 4) It branched off a loop road that was constructed in the Depsang Plains in 1999–2000 in an area called "Trig Heights", close to the LAC (or, in the Indian view, across their perceived LAC). From the loop road, an access road through the Raki Nala valley to Burtsa Nala was also constructed around 2010. By 2013, the Chinese had the ability to ply vehicles in the Raki Nala river bed. (Map 5)

Coupled with these constructions, the Indian Army also reported a steep rise in incursions by the Chinese PLA into Indian territory: 50 incursions during 2005, 70 in 2009 in the Trig Heights area, and 30 incursions in 2009 in the Depsang Bulge area. Given that the Indians regard the entire Depsang Bulge as Indian territory, all the constructions in the area were "Chinese intrusions".

The Indians were also improving their border infrastructure during this period, albeit at a slower pace. The air strip at Daulat Beg Oldi (DBO), at the northern perimeter of the Depsang Plains, was reactivated in 2008, after a gap of 43 years. The Chinese immediately objected to this action. India also commissioned a road link to DBO in 2001, scheduled to be completed by 2012. The initial road did not meet the all-weather requirement, and it had to be rebuilt on an improved alignment later, but several sections of it were available for winter use by 2013. (Note: The road was eventually completed in 2019. It is called Darbuk–Shyok–DBO Road (DS-DBO Road).)

== 2013 standoff ==
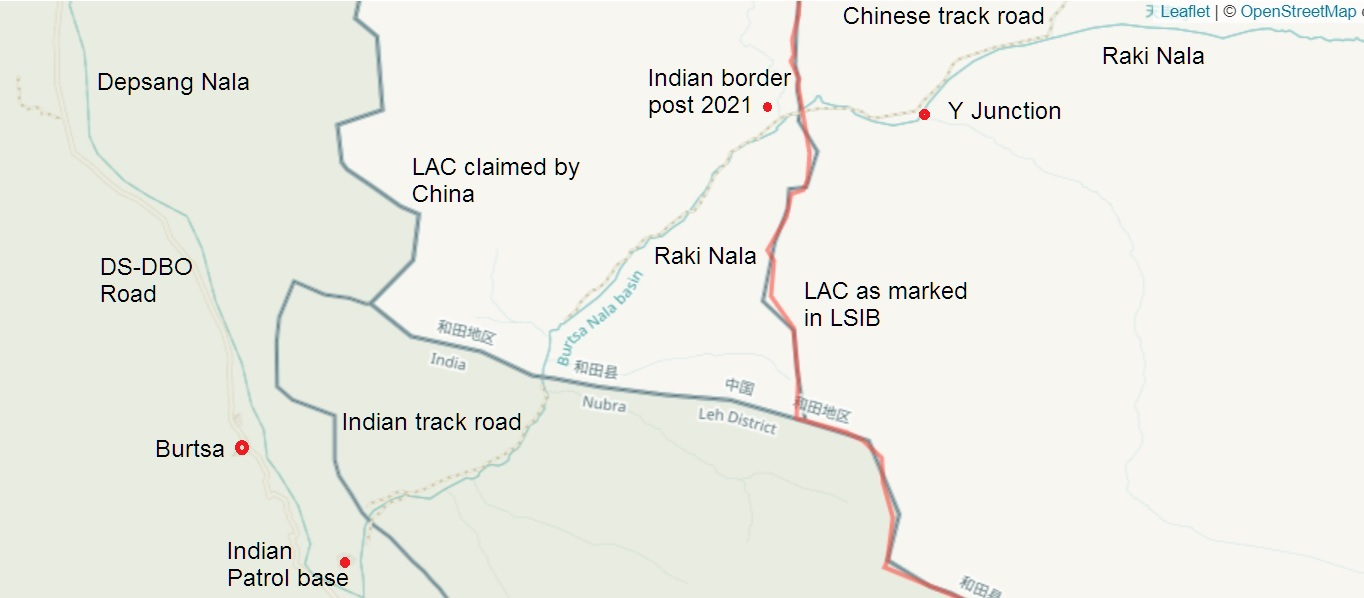
Map 5: The Y-Junction in the Burtsa Nala Valley

On the night of 15 April 2013, three weeks before a scheduled visit of Chinese Premier Li Keqiang to India, a platoon of Chinese troops intruded into Indian territory and erected a tented post. The Indian border police spotted an advance patrol of theirs the next morning at a distance of 600 metres from the Indian post. Aerial reconnaissance detected the tented post on the Raki Nala, on the site of an old Indian post. It had 19 Chinese soldiers (later mentioned as 40), including five officers, two dogs, and three SUVs. (Note: The details of the location, the number of troopers, dogs and vehicles varied among the various news reports. The Indian newspapers were also hazy regarding the locations at that time, often reporting it as "Depsang Plains", which is really to the north of Burtsa.) The Chinese held placards reading "this is Chinese territory, go back".

The location of the standoff was described as being 19 km inside Indian territory. Years later, the location was stated as the so-called "bottleneck" in the Burtsa Nala valley, where the rocky formation of the valley prohibits vehicular movement. The "bottleneck" is also close to a point called "Y-junction", where a branch valley emanates to the southeast, allowing the Indian patrols to reach other points on the LAC.

The Indian border troops set up their own tented camp 300 metres away as per the agreed protocol. India's China Study Group met and recommended stern measures to signal India's displeasure. However, prime minister Manmohan Singh decided that it should be treated as a "localised problem". The local commanders of both the sides met at the Chushul–Moldo Border Personnel Meeting point. While the Indian side asked the Chinese to withdraw to original positions as per the 1976 border patrolling agreement, the Chinese produced a map they described as the "LAC of 1959". (Note: This is a fictitious line that Chinese have claimed off and on since the 1962 war to make it appear as if they were already present at the 1962 ceasefire line back in 1959. The usual misrepresentation is that the Chinese premier Zhou Enlai sent it to certain African-Asian leaders in November 1959, whereas, in fact, he sent it in November 1962. (See LAC of 1959.) The line documented by the African-Asian leaders in their "Colombo Proposals" is shown in Map 3 of this page.) According to the map, the entire Depsang Bulge belonged to China.

Indian ambassador in China S. Jaishankar picked up the matter with Deng Zhen Hua, the Director-General of boundary affairs in the Chinese Foreign Ministry, and asked for the incursion to be rolled back. Around the same time, the Indian troops in the Chumar sector in southern Ladakh constructed a tin shed at their patrol point close to the LAC. Director-General Deng asked for the structure to be removed. At the border personnel meeting on 23 April, the Chinese officers repeated the demand and also asked for the removal of "bunkers" at Fukche (also in southern Ladakh). The Indian government in Delhi sent additional diplomatic signals to force the pace of negotiations and the Indian forces detained two Chinese officials who came to investigate the shed at Chumar. The Chinese eventually disengaged on 5 May and took some retaliatory actions at Chumar.

== 2020–2022 standoff ==
After the 2013 standoff, India established a permanent post to the west of the Y-junction and bottleneck, from where Indian troops observed and stopped any Chinese patrols attempting to cross beyond that point. Indian patrols, however, continued their old patrol routes on foot going through the Y-junction. These patrols reached Patrol Point 10 upstream along the Raki Nala, and made a circuit through Patrol Points 11, 11A, 12, and 13, returning to the Y-junction.

During the 2020–2022 China–India skirmishes, it was reported that a standoff was occurring again at the "bottleneck" or "Y-junction". As the Indian patrols attempted to go beyond the bottleneck by foot, Chinese troops were reportedly coming up in vehicles and blocking their passage. In order to avoid confrontation with the Chinese troops, the Indian patrols were apparently asked to not go beyond the bottleneck point. Thus they were unable to reach Patrol Point 10 in the Raki Nala valley and related Patrol Points 11, 11A, 12, and 13 along their perceived Line of Actual Control.

Indian government officials have claimed that the Chinese obstruction at the bottleneck has been going on since the 2017 Doklam standoff, and hence, it was a "legacy issue" unrelated to the 2020 standoff. Former Army officers have however contested the assertion, claiming that regular patrols have been going on ever since the 2013 Depsang standoff ended.

== General bibliography ==
- Bhattacharji, Romesh (2012), Ladakh: Changing, Yet Unchanged, New Delhi: Rupa Publications – via Academia.edu
- Fisher, Margaret W.; Rose, Leo E.; Huttenback, Robert A. (1963), Himalayan Battleground: Sino-Indian Rivalry in Ladakh, Praeger – via archive.org
- Fravel, M. Taylor (2008), Strong Borders, Secure Nation: Cooperation and Conflict in China's Territorial Disputes, Princeton University Press, ISBN 978-1-4008-2887-6
- Gupta, Shishir (2014), The Himalayan Face-Off: Chinese Assertion and the Indian Riposte, Hachette India, ISBN 978-93-5009-606-2
- Hoffmann, Steven A. (1990), India and the China Crisis, University of California Press, ISBN 978-0-520-06537-6
- Johri, Sitaram (1969), Chinese Invasion of Ladakh, Himalaya Publications
- Joshi, Manoj (2021), Eastern Ladakh, the Longer Perspective, Observer Research Foundation
- Menon, Shivshankar (2016), Choices: Inside the Making of India's Foreign Policy, Brookings Institution Press, ISBN 978-0-8157-2911-2
- Nyachu, Deldan Kunzes Angmo (July–December 2013), "The Depsang Standoff at the India-China Border along the LAC: View from Ladakh" (PDF), Himalayan and Central Asian Studies, 17 (3/4), ProQuest 1470421272
- Sandhu, P. J. S.; Shankar, Vinay; Dwivedi, G. G. (2015), 1962: A View from the Other Side of the Hill, Vij Books India Pvt Ltd, ISBN 978-93-84464-37-0
- Woodman, Dorothy (1969), Himalayan Frontiers: A Political Review of British, Chinese, Indian, and Russian Rivalries, Praeger – via archive.org
