= Jeong Nala =

Jeong Nala Jiwan Nala, Nacho Chu
- Location of the mouth Jeong Nala (Southern Xinjiang)

Location
- Countries: China and India
- Provinces: Xinjiang and Ladakh

Physical characteristics
- Source
  - location: Aksai Chin
  - coordinates: 35.0661°N 78.5329°E
  - elevation: 5,500 metres (18,000 ft)
- Mouth
  - location: Shyok River
  - coordinates: 34.9925°N 77.9989°E
  - elevation: 4,400 metres (14,400 ft)
- Length: 50 kilometres (31 mi)

Basin features
- Progression: Murgo Nala, Shyok River
- River system: Indus River

The Jeong Nala, also called Jiwan Nala and Nacho Chu, and called Xidagou (Chinese: 西大沟; pinyin: Xī dà gōu) by China, is a river of the Indus River system in the Aksai Chin region disputed by China and India. It originates at the eastern edge of the Karakoram Range in Chinese-administered Aksai Chin, and flows west into Indian-administered Ladakh, just to the south of the highly contested Depsang Bulge. It debouches into the Shyok River near Sultan Chushku in Ladakh.

== Geography ==
Depsang Plains region
(and the "traditional customary boundary" points of China declared in 1960).

The Jeong Nala flows immediately to the south of the "Depsang Bulge", which remains a region of active contest between China and India as part of the Sino-Indian border dispute. Depsang Bulge houses the valley of the Burtsa Nala, which turns south near Murgo and merges with Jeong Nala shortly before the latter joins the Shyok River at Sultan Chushku (a campsite). The historical trans-Karakoram trade route crosses the Shyok River at Sultan Chushku and follows the valleys of Jeong Nala and Burtsa Nala towards Murgo. India's DS-DBO Road leading to Daulat Beg Oldi (DBO) follows this historical route.

The Karakash River, just 10 km to the south of Jeong Nala, flows eastwards into the Tarim Basin, whereas Jeong Nala flows west into the Indus River system. China's Heweitan military base is situated on the bank of Karakash River, and exerts strategic control over the Jeong Nala valley.

The Tiankong Highway connecting Heweitan and Tianwendian bases passes through the Jeong valley. China also has constructed a motorable road in the Jeong valley, providing strategic access the Line of Actual Control with India.

== Bibliography ==
- Bhattacharji, Romesh (2012), Ladakh: Changing, Yet Unchanged, New Delhi: Rupa Publications – via Academia.edu
