= Tianwendian =

Tianwendian 天文点
- military defence area and border post
- Location within Southern Xinjiang Location within Ladakh
- Coordinates: 35.331°N 78.179°E
- Elevation: 5,171.2 m (16,966 ft)

Tianwendian
- Traditional Chinese: 天文點
- Simplified Chinese: 天文点
- Literal meaning: astronomical point
Transcriptions
Standard Mandarin
- Hanyu Pinyin: Tiānwéndiǎn
- Wade–Giles: Tʻien2-wên2-tien3

Tianwendian (Chinese: 天文点; pinyin: Tiānwén diǎn; lit. 'astronomical point') is the Chinese name for the northern Aksai Chin region near the Karakoram Pass, which is referred to as Depsang Plains in India. A border outpost established in the area in the 1980s is currently the main reference point for Tianwendian. Lying in the Chip Chap River valley close to China's Line of Actual Control with India, it serves as the military headquarters for the Tianwendian region.

== Name ==
Tianwendian means "astronomical point" in Chinese. The first two characters "tiānwén" (天文; lit. 'celestial pattern') is the Chinese word for "astronomy." The name is said to have been used to describe a military defence area in northern Aksai Chin in the run-up to the 1962 Sino-Indian War. The region was also referred to as the "sky defence area" (Chinese: 天防区; pinyin: Tiān fángqū). The name is an obvious allusion to the high elevation of the area, reported as 6200 metres above sea level.

The region extends till the next defence area to the south, viz., Heweitan ("river beach"). The Depsang Bulge area has been referred to as the "South Tianwendian Valley", its river Burtsa Nala as "Tiannan", and its mountain pass to the Jeong Nala valley as the "Tianhexi Pass"—the "western pass between Tian(wendian) and He(weitan)". In this respect, Tianwendian is the Chinese equivalent of India's "Depsang Plains".

In the 1980s, a specific outpost named Tianwendian was established close to China's Line of Actual Control with India's Daulat Beg Oldi sector. Now it is more common to use the name to refer to the outpost than the defence area.

== Military outpost ==
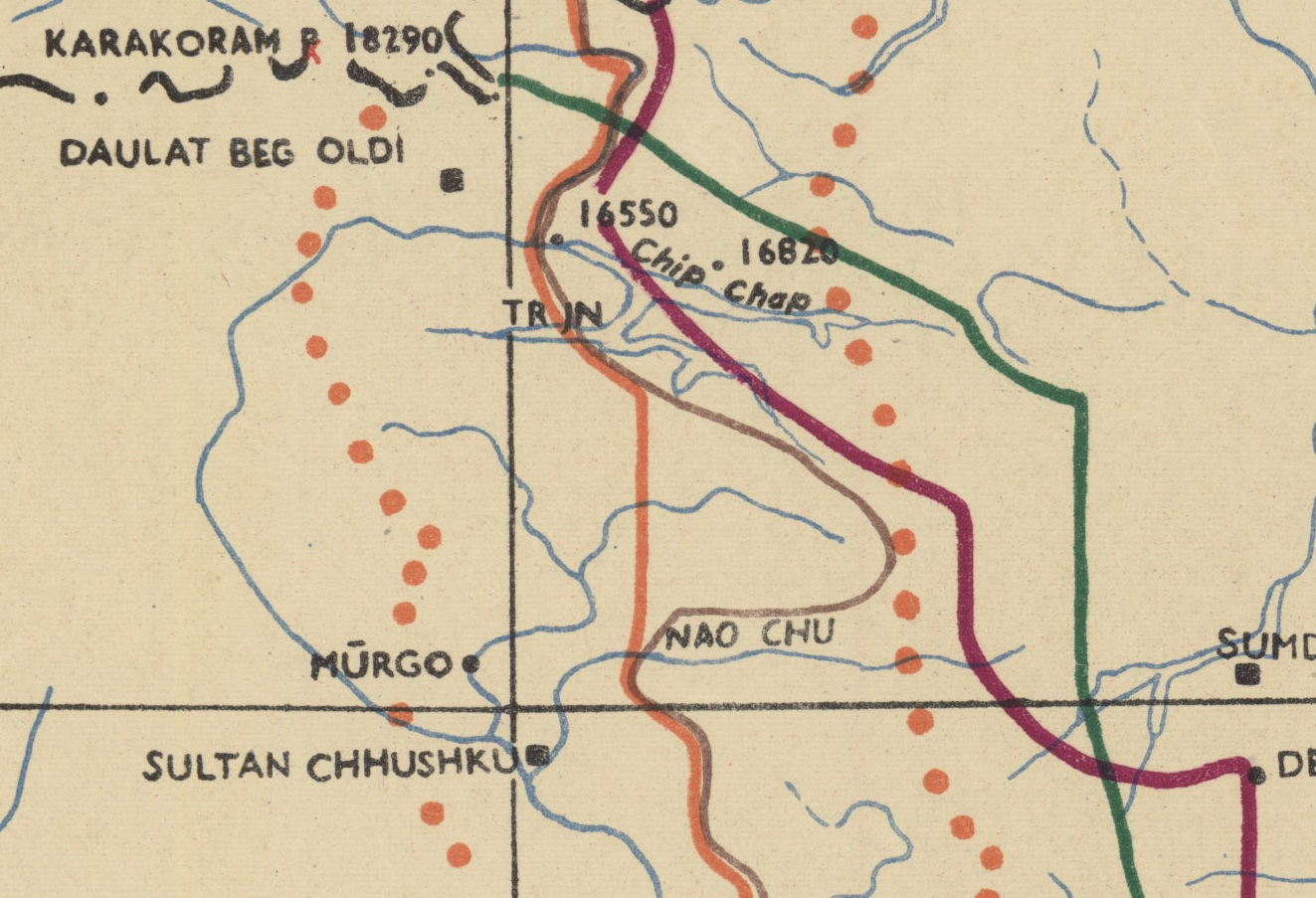
Chinese claim lines in the Depsang Plains: 1956 claim in green, 1962 pre-war position in purple, 1962 ceasefire line in brown; The position marked 16820 corresponds to Point 5243. (US Army HQ, 1962)

China originally established a military outpost in 1959 at Point 5243 (Chinese: 5243哨卡), which is at an elevation of 5243 meters above sea level. It was composed of a border company. In the run up to the 1962 war, China called the entire area Tianwendian Defence Area and used the Point 5243 post as its headquarters.

The newer Tianwendian post was established after the 1962 war. China said it was an astronomical observatory. A few years later India realised that it was an not an observatory but a military post. Over the years, China has continued to expand the post.

Around the time of the 2013 Daulat Beg Oldi incident, PLA constructed a radar station, an 11 m radome at an elevation of 5530m, at this outpost.

=== Forward Post 5390 ===
Between 2006 and 2008, China constructed forward post 5390 (named after the highest point in that area).

== India-China Border Meeting point ==
The highest of the five Border Personnel Meeting points is located near Tianwendian. The Indian camp at Daulat Beg Oldi serves as the counter-party for this meeting point.

== See also ==
- Shenxianwan
- List of locations in Aksai Chin § Outposts

== Bibliography ==
- Sandhu, P. J. S.; Shankar, Vinay; Dwivedi, G. G. (2015). 1962: A View from the Other Side of the Hill. Vij Books India Pvt Ltd. ISBN 978-93-84464-37-0.
