= Heweitan =

Chinese border outpost in Aksai Chin

Heweitan 河尾滩
- Border outpost
- Location within Southern Xinjiang Location within Ladakh
- Coordinates: 35.002°N 78.592°E
- Elevation: 5,418 m (17,776 ft)

Heweitan
- Traditional Chinese: 河尾灘
- Simplified Chinese: 河尾滩
Transcriptions
Standard Mandarin
- Hanyu Pinyin: Héwěitān
- Wade–Giles: ho2 wei3 t'an1

Heweitan (Chinese: 河尾滩) is the location of a Chinese border outpost in the region of Aksai Chin that is controlled by China (as part of Hotan County, Hotan Prefecture, Xinjiang) but disputed by India. According to the Chinese Ministry of National Defense, it is the highest border outpost in the country.

== Geography ==
India–China Line of Actual Control near Heweitan
(with points on "traditional customary boundary" of China declared in 1960)

Heweitan is near the head of the Karakash River as it emerges from the Karakoram mountains into the Aksai Chin plateau. Karakash flows northeast through Aksai Chin until reaching the Kunlun Mountains, where it bends to northwest. The Chang Chenmo caravan route between Ladakh and Xinjiang via the Galwan and Karakash valleys passed through this location. In modern times, the Tiankong Highway connects Heweitan to Tianwendian and Kongka Pass bases of China.

Heweitan is also close to the head of the Jeong Nala, which flows west into the Shyok River in Ladakh, and is able to strategically control its valley. China also has a motorable road in the Jeong valley to access the Line of Actual Control with India.

== Sino-Indian border conflict ==
Heweitan was one of the sectors of the Chinese offensive during the Sino-Indian War in 1962. This base served as the HQ for the sector, and the forces in this sector played an adversarial role to the Indian forces in Galwan River Valley.

== Media coverage ==
Being supposedly the highest border outpost in China, Heweitan is often reported upon by the Chinese media. CCTV-7 alone had made full-hour coverage in 2014 and half-hour coverage in 2016 about this border outpost. In late 2018, Chinese Ministry of National Defense made a theatrical trailer promoting border troops that was shown in the movie theatre. It included footages from Heweitan.

== See also ==
- List of locations in Aksai Chin § Outposts
- Galwan River
- Jeong Nala
