= Depsang Plains =

Plains at the north of Aksai Chin divided between China and India

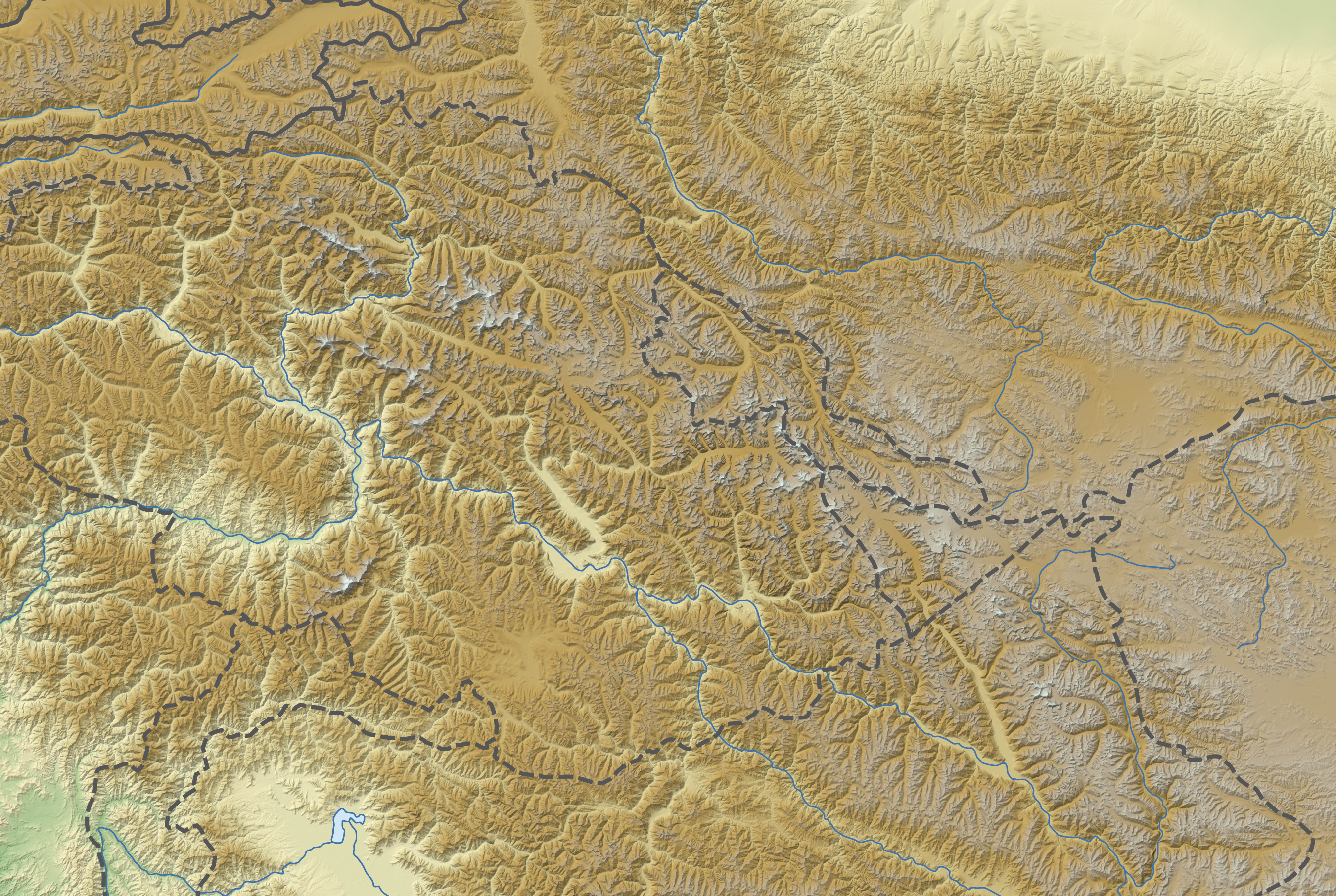
- Location within Karakoram Location within Ladakh Location within Southern Xinjiang
- Floor elevation: 17,400 ft (5,300 m)
- Length: 25 mi (40 km) east-west
- Width: 12–13 mi (19–21 km) north-south
- Area: 310 mi^{2} (800 km^{2})

Geography
- Country: India, China
- State: Ladakh, Xinjiang
- Region: Aksai Chin
- District: Leh district, Hotan County
- Coordinates: 35.32°N 77.99°E
- River: Chip Chap River; Tributaries of Karakash River; Tributaries of Burtsa Nala
- Interactive map of Depsang Plains

Depsang Plains
- Traditional Chinese: 達普桑平地
- Simplified Chinese: 达普桑平地
Transcriptions
Standard Mandarin
- Hanyu Pinyin: Dápǔsāng píngdì

The Depsang Plains, a high-altitude gravelly plain in the northwest portion of the disputed Aksai Chin region of Kashmir, divided into Indian and Chinese administered portions by a Line of Actual Control. India controls the western portion of the plains as part of Ladakh, while the eastern portion is controlled by China and claimed by India. The Line of Control with Pakistan-administered Gilgit-Baltistan is 80 kilometres (50 mi) west of the Depsang Plains, with the Siachen Glacier in-between. Ladakh's traditional trade route to Central Asia passed through the Depsang Plains, with the Karakoram Pass lying directly to its north.

The Depsang plains are also part of the area called Sub-Sector North (SSN) by the Indian military. The area sees frequent tension between China and India. Major standoffs between the two countries occurred in 2013, 2015 and 2020.

== Name ==
Depsang (or Dipsang) means 'open, elevated plain' in Tibetan.

== Geography ==
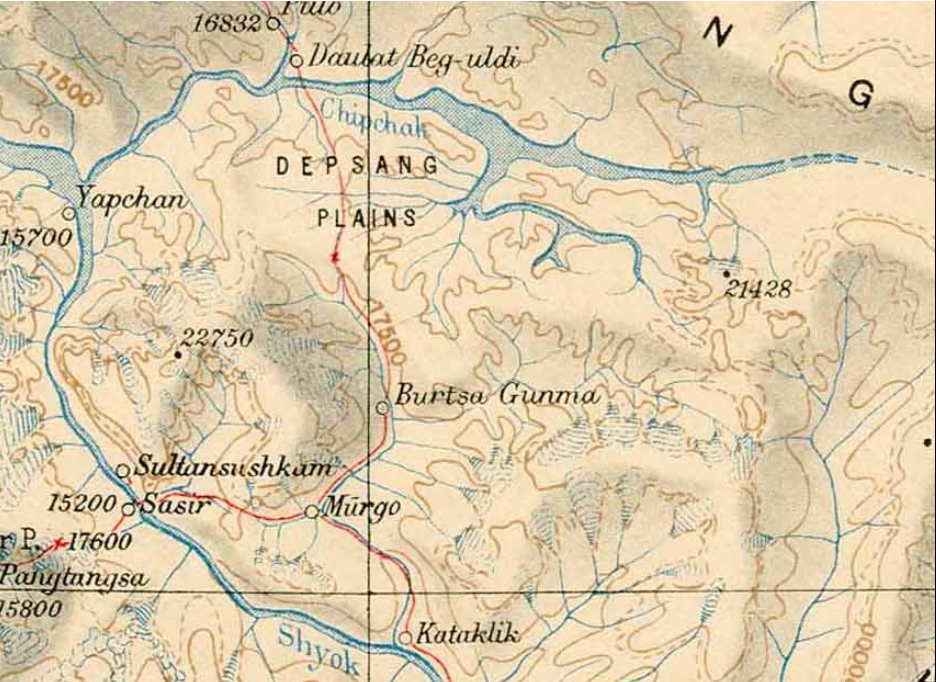
Depsang Plains depicted on a 1916 Survey of India map

Depsang Plains
(and points on the "traditional customary boundary" of China declared in 1960). (Note: The border shown is that marked by the contributors to OpenStreetMap. It may not be fully accurate.)

The Depsang plains are located in the north-western Aksai Chin. They are bounded on the north by the valley of the Chip Chap River and on the west by the Shyok River. On the east, they are bounded by low hills of the Lak Tsung range, which separate them from the basin of the Karakash River. In the south, the Depsang Plains proper end at the Depsang La pass, but in common parlance, the Depsang region is taken to include the mountainous region to the south of it, including the "Depsang Bulge". The latter is a bulge in theoretical Indian territory, housing the upper course of the Burtsa Nala.

The Karakoram Pass is located to the north of the Depsang Plains, while the Lingzi Thang plains lie to the southeast. On the west is the southern part of the Rimo glacier, the source of the Shyok River.

Francis Younghusband, who travelled here in the late 19th century, described the area as follows:

The Depsang Plains are more than seventeen thousand feet above sea-level, and are of gravel, as bare as a gravel-walk to a suburban villa. Away behind us the snowy peaks of Saser and Nubra appeared above the horizon like the sails of some huge ships; but before us was nothing but gravel plains and great gravel mounds, terribly desolate and depressing. Across these plains blew blinding squalls of snow, and at night, though it was now the middle of summer, there were several degrees of frost.

=== Line of Actual Control ===
In 1962, China and India fought a war over the border dispute, following which the Depsang Plains have been divided between the two countries. The de facto border, called the Line of Actual Control (LAC), runs east of the traditional caravan route between Ladakh and Central Asia. Only the militaries of the two countries inhabit the region at the present time, distributed into numerous military camps. The nearest inhabited village is Murgo.

=== Locations ===
Burtsa, alternately spelled as Burtse, is a historic halting spot on the caravan route at the southern end of the Depsang Plains region, where the Depsang Nala joins the Burtsa Nala. (Note: There were actually two campsites called Burtsa Gongma ("upper Burtsa") and Burtsa Yogma ("lower Burtsa"). Only ruined shelters now exist from those sites.) It currently serves as a military camp of the Indo-Tibetan Border Police (ITBP) and the Indian Army on the Darbuk-Shyok-DBO road, about 15 kilometres on the India's side of the LAC.

North of Burtsa is Qizil Langar, also called Qazi Langar. It lies in a narrow, reddish gorge, immediately to the south of the Depasang La. The Depsang Nala stream flows in the gorge from the west and takes a turn to the south at Qizil Langar. Depsang Nala joins the Burtsa Nala a little to the south of Burtsa and the combined river flows west and drains into the Murgo Nala near the village of Murgo.

Gapshan or Yapshan is a halting place at the confluence of the Chip Chap River and the Shyok River. In the past, on numerous occasions, the Chong Kumdan glacier has blocked the flow of the Shyok River forming a lake called the Gapshan Lake; once the ice dam melts, the lake drains away. The view from Gapshan is dominated by the Shahi Kangri group of peaks. India's Sasoma–Saser La-DBO Road passes through the region.

At a campground, Polu (or Pulo/Pola) is a traditional temporary shelter built using local mud, four miles north of DBO along the DBO Nala, Maj A. M. Sethi found a memorial stone left by Dr. Philips Christiaan Visser in 1935. It lies on the DBO-Karakoram Pass Road. The memorial stone inside the tent is presently maintained by India's Border Roads Organisation (BRO).

Tianwendian ("astronomical point") is a border post in the Chinese-controlled territory. It was established after the 1962 war. Before that, another post called Point 5243 served as the main base. From Tianwendian Defence Area, the Chinese have a line of sight extending to Siachen glacier, 140 km away. Closer to the Indian-controlled territory is forward post 5390, a PLA observation point which acts as an extension of Tianwendian. The Tiankong Highway within the China-administered Tibet runs parallel to the LAC, connecting Tianwendian and Kongka to the south.

== History ==
=== Caravan route ===
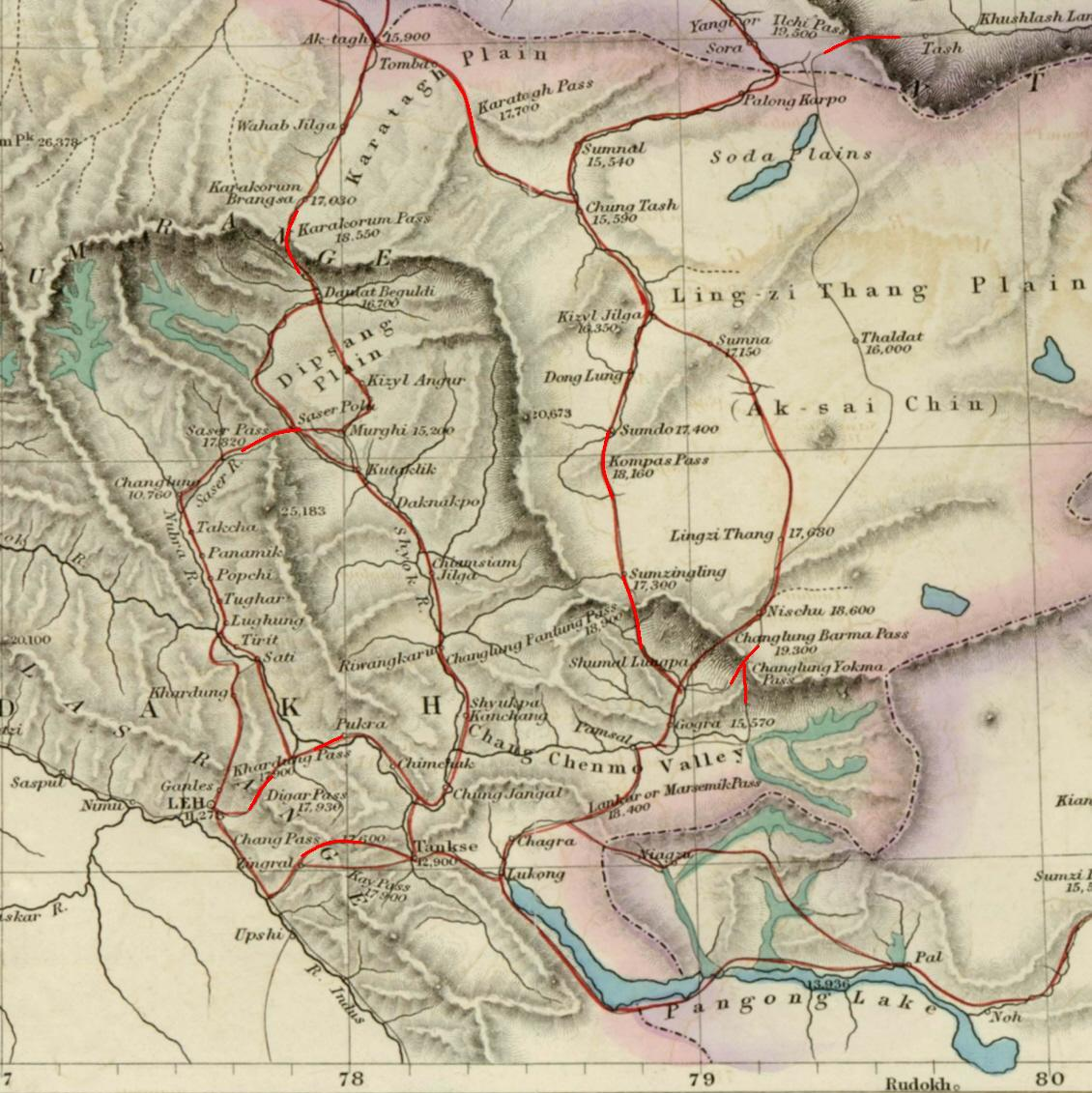
Trade routes between Ladakh and Xinjiang

The Depsang Plains were regularly traversed by trade caravans, coming via the Karakoram Pass in the north from Yarkand beyond. Filippo de Filippi, who explored the area in 1913–1914, described:

... the caravans come and go incessantly, in the summer, in astonishing numbers. The first one of the season passed on June 28th, coming from Sanju on the Yarkand road; then more and larger ones came; in July there were four in one day, almost all travelling from Central Asia toward Leh—the Ladakhis usually do their trading at home. The caravans were of all sizes, from small groups of 3 or 4 men with 5 or 6 animals to large parties with 40 or more pack-animals; the men on foot or riding asses, the better-to-do merchants on caparisoned horses ...

Filippi also wrote that the experienced caravaners passed through the Depsang Plains without stopping, travelling a distance of 31 miles between Daulat Beg Oldi and Murgo in a single day. Others stopped, either at Qizil Langar to the south of Depsang La, or at Burtsa further south. A stream running from below Depsang La, called Depsang Nala, waters these parts leading to the growth of the burtza plant, which served as fodder as well as fuel for the campers.

The trading caravans declined during the 1940s during tensions in Xinjiang (Chinese Turkestan) and completely stopped in the 1950s. In 1953, the Indian consulate in Kashgar was closed down. The Indian prime minister Jawaharlal Nehru told the Parliament that the Chinese wish to treat Xinjiang as a "closed area". Subsequently, China built the Xinjiang–Tibet highway through Aksai Chin starting the Sino-Indian border dispute, which persists till the present day.

In modern times, the Darbuk–Shyok–DBO Road (DS–DBO Road) has been laid by India along the old caravan route. From south to north, it passes through Sultan Chushku, Murgo, Burtsa and Qizil Langar, to reach Daulat Beg Oldi (DBO).

=== Exploration ===
In 1893, Charles Murray, 7th Earl of Dunmore, in his daily records of his travels with Major Roche through Ladakh, Tibet and Pamirs, wrote of seeing musk deer, kiang, Tibetan antelope and a butterfly in the region in and around the Depsang Plains. Dunmore noted that K2, the second highest mountain in the world, could be seen from the plateaus. In 1906, Sven Hedin had travelled east from Burtsa to the Aksai Chin lake on the traditional silk road. The traditional route to Shahidula passed through the plains; Kizil Jilga to Haji Langar to Shahidula.

== Flora and fauna ==
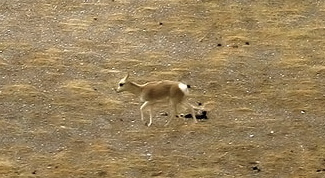
Tibetan gazelle, a species of the Tibetan antelope

The Depsang Plains are widely observed as forming a high-altitude cold desert without any flora or fauna. Filippo de Filippi, who explored the region in the 1910s, wrote that "the surface of the [Depsang] plateau is a mass of minute detritus, and is entirely devoid of vegetation, except for occasional patches of a yellowish-green plant". A 1985 expedition to the Rimo Glacier found blooming plants at a few places and that "at places [the] plains are marshy and our mules were sinking and we all had to help them out." Burtse (Artemisia spp.) plant of the Asteraceae family grows along the Burtsa Nala and Depsang Nala, lending its name to the region. Its leaves were used for fodder and its roots as firewood by caravaners. Potentilla pamirica is also found in the plains.

Small populations of Tibetan antelope (or "chiru"), mountain weasel, Ladakh pika, bharal (blue sheep), Tibetan wolf and woolly hare, among others, can be seen in the plains. According to Brigadier Teg B Kapur, "the [Depsang] plain abounds with wild horses and hares". The populations of chiru are migratory and come to the high-altitude plains for summer grazing. These populations are also the westernmost population of chiru, found at altitudes of up to 5500m. A Schaller Conservation Survey of chiru conducted by the Wildlife Trust of India in 2005 sighted 149 individuals of chiru in 22 groups, all females and kids, in the Depsang area. The southernmost area where chiru were spotted was the Thuksu Doon Doon nullah which flows near the Depsang La. The report says that "Chiru is a mixed feeder and favoured graminoids and forb plant species". In the past, Chiru were killed for their fine wool (called shahtoosh) and many efforts have been taken to protect them in India. Populations of Kiang also move back and forth across the disputed border. In 1990, it was reported that the proposed Daultberg–Depsang Sanctuary would contain the last wild yak, but Schaller Conservation Survey did not locate any in the 2000s.

DRDO-reared double-humped Bactrian camels (originally used along the silk route) will be deployed at DBO and Depsang by the Indian Army for patrolling and transportation. Zanskar ponies are also being used by the Indian Army.

== Sino-Indian border dispute ==
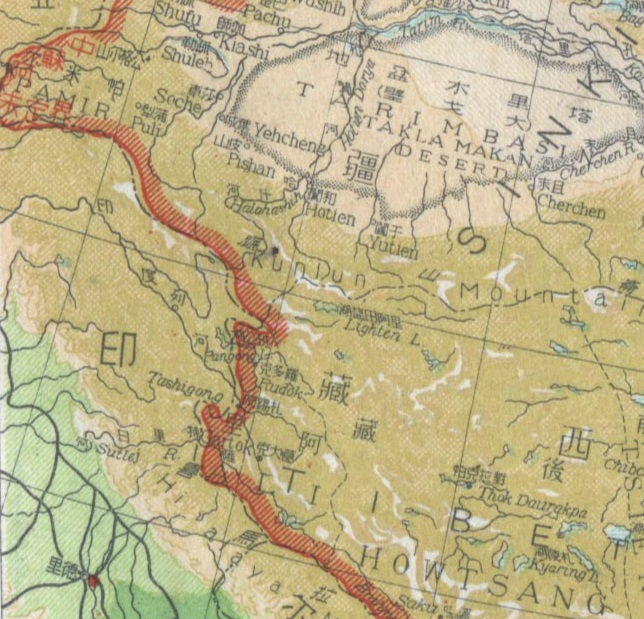
Ladakh border claimed by the Republic of China in a 1947 map. (Note: Even though the map is of very low resolution, it is apparent that the Chip Chap River is shown entirely within Ladakh. Qaratagh-su, a stream that flows down from the Qaratagh Pass and joins the Karakash River is shown as the source of Karakash. Karackattu, The Corrosive Compromise (2020, Figure 1) gives more detailed maps showing Samzungling and Galwan river as part of Ladakh.)

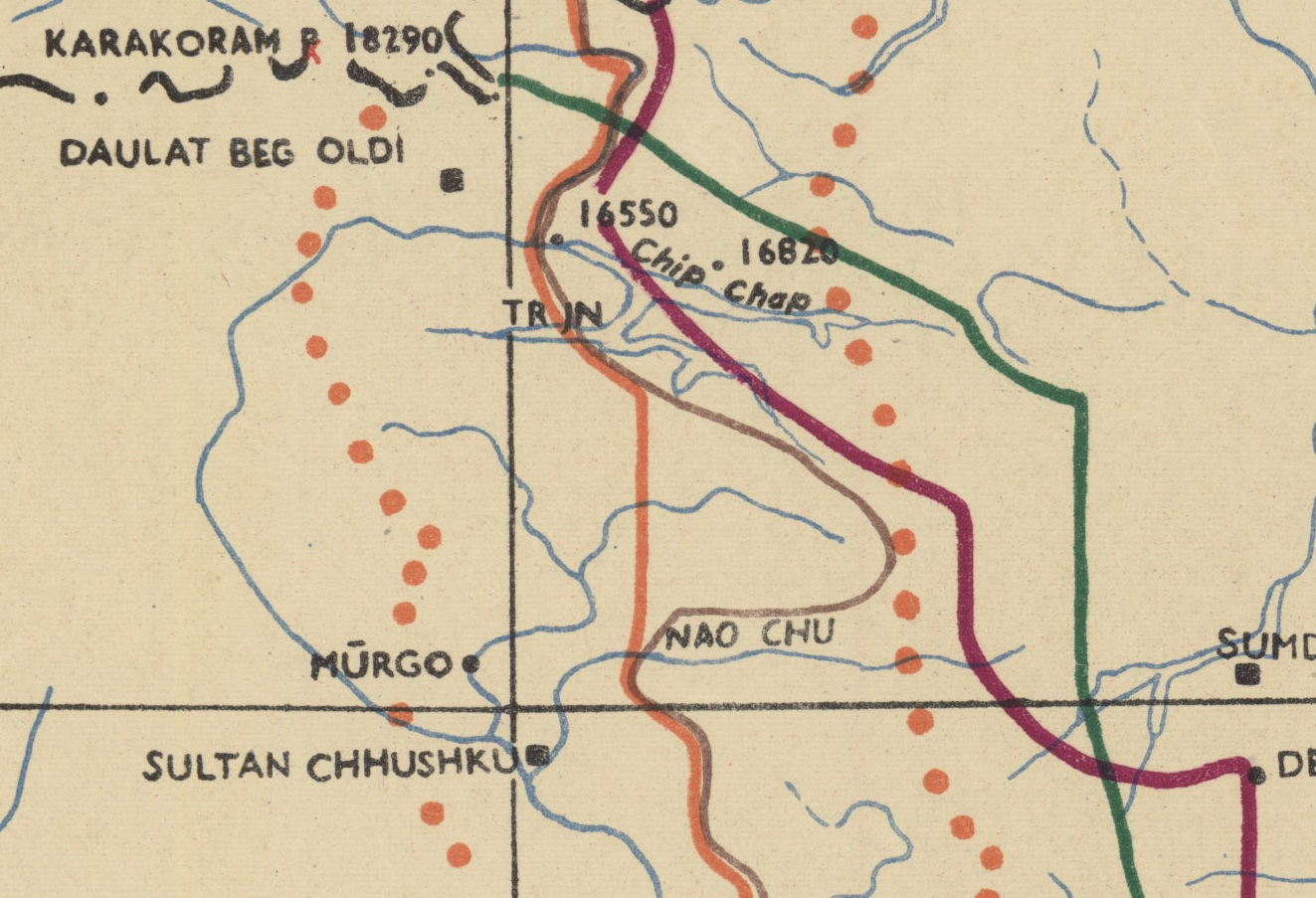
Chinese claim lines in the Depsang Plains: 1956 claim line in green, 1960 claim line in dark brown, 1962 ceasefire line in orange. (Note: Map by the US Army Headquarters in 1962. In addition to the two claim lines, the blue line indicates the position in 1959, the purple line that in September 1962 prior to the Sino-Indian War, and the orange line, which largely coincides with the dark brown line, the position the end of the war. The dotted lines bound a 20-km demilitarisation zone proposed by China after the war.)

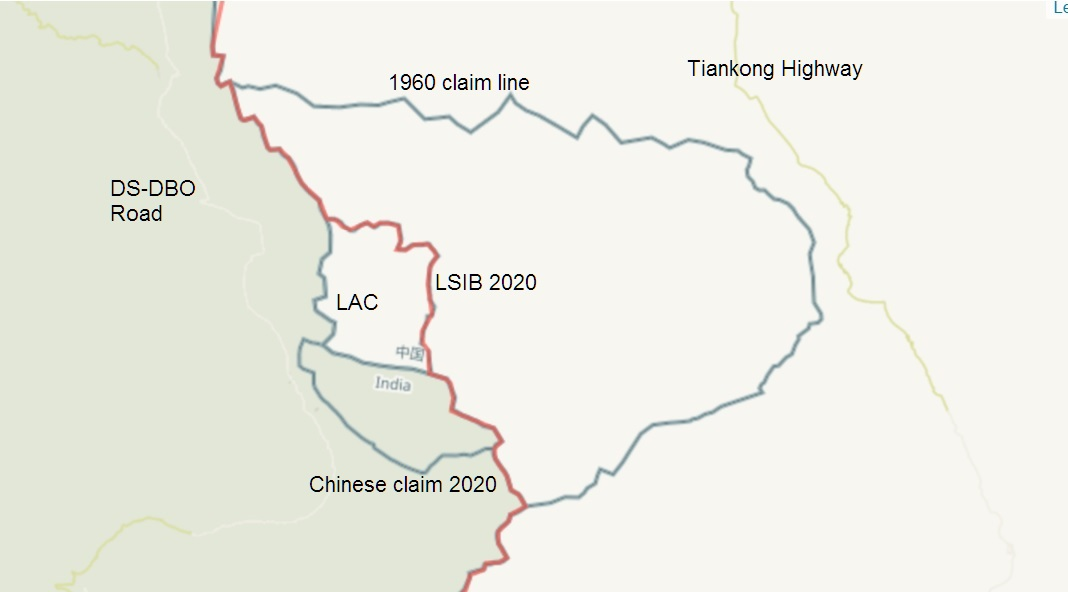
Current situation at the mouth of Depsang Bulge: the established LAC from 1962 in red, the effective LAC in 2020 as per OpenStreetMap in green; additional Chinese claims further west.

The Republic of China (1912–1949), having faced a revolution in Tibet in 1911, apparently made secret plans to acquire Aksai Chin plateau in order to create a road link between Xinjiang and Tibet. These plans began to get manifested in public maps only towards the end of its rule.

While the Republic of China claims included the Aksai Chin proper, they stopped at the foot of the Karakoram mountains, leaving all the rivers that flow into the Shyok River within India, including the Chip Chap River. (See map.) Communist China also published the "Big Map of the People's Republic of China" in 1956 with a similar boundary, now called the 1956 claim line.

However, in 1960 China advanced its claim line further west, dissecting the Chip Chap River. The Chinese said little by way of justification for this advancement other than to claim that it was their "traditional customary boundary" which was allegedly formed through a "long historical process". They claimed that the line was altered in the recent past only due to "British imperialism". (Note: But the military justification for the advancement is not hard to see. The 1956 claim line ran along the watershed dividing the Shyok River basin and the Lingzitang lake basin. It conceded the strategic higher ground of the Karakoram Range to India. The 1960 claim line advanced it to the Karakoram ridge line despite the fact that it did not form a dividing line of watersheds.)

Meanwhile, India continued to claim the entire Aksai Chin plateau.

=== 1962 war ===
India's Intelligence Bureau patrols had come across indications of Chinese activity in the Depsang Plains prior to 1958. However, the Bureau chief B. N. Mullik has stated that "the Chinese did not come into Depsang Plains till October, 1960".

The 1962 Sino-Indian War in the Depsang Plains lasted two days, 20–21 October 1962. The Chinese forces in the area were based at Point 5243 in the present day Tianwendian area. The Indian posts, set up in accordance with India's "forward policy", were manned by the 14th battalion of the Jammu and Kashmir Militia (later Ladakh Scouts), and were mostly of a platoon or a section strength.

The Chinese forces first targeted the post they called "Indian Stronghold No. 6" at "Red Top Hill". They regarded this post specially threatening to their lines of communication. As per the Chinese assessment, the attacking troops had a superiority of 10 to 1 in numbers and 7 to 1 in fire power. The post was eliminated in under two hours, with 42 soldiers killed and 20 captured. Following on this success, the Chinese eliminated 6–7 other Indian posts of a section strength (8–10 troops) and 2 further posts on the second day.

The remaining Indian posts were then given permission to withdraw, as they were not tactically sited and had no mutual support. By 24 October, the withdrawal was completed, with the Indians continuing to hold Saser Brangsa, Murgo, Sultan Chushku and the Galwan estuary on the Shyok River. The Chinese forces advanced to their 1960 claim line in most locations. The one exception was the Burtsa Nala valley to the south of Depsang Plains, where the Chinese eliminated the "bulge" in the Indian territory granted in 1960. This area, called Depsang Bulge, continues to be contested till the present day.

=== Depsang Bulge conflicts ===
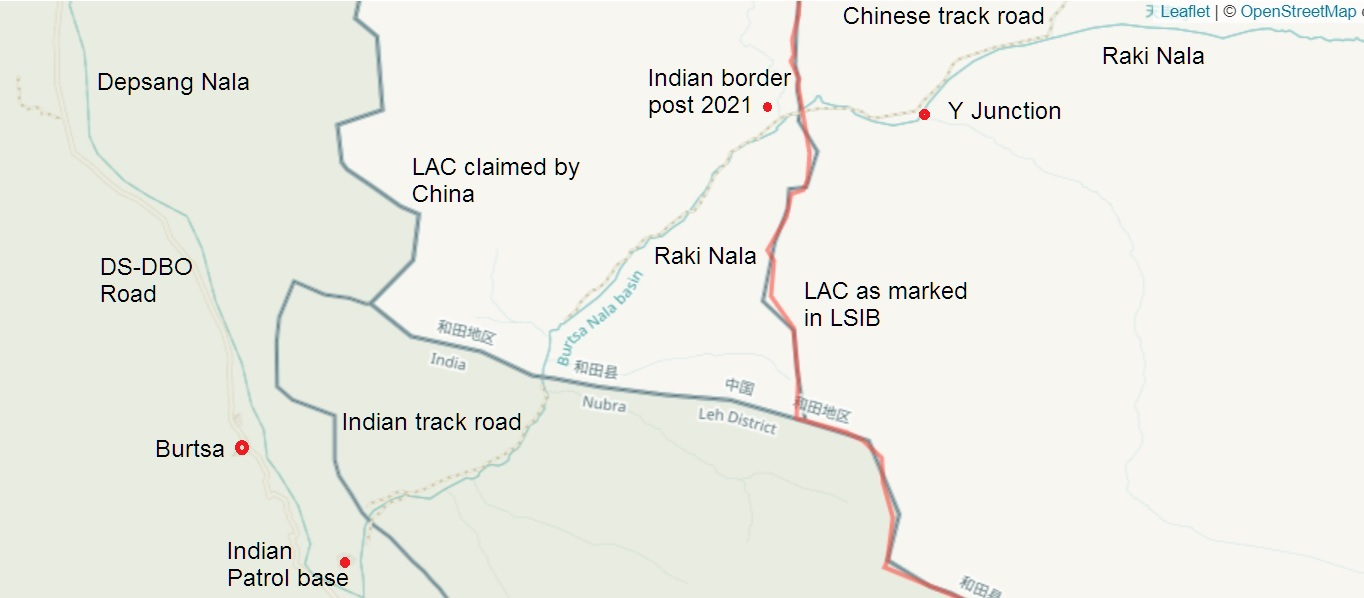
The standoff at the "bottleneck"

India continues to maintain the bulge in the Indian territory as per China's 1960 claim line as Indian territory, while its troops have been asked to patrol up to the ceasefire line marked on Indian maps (which has been referred to as the Patrol Point 10 or PP-10).

In April 2013, the Chinese PLA troops set up a temporary camp at the mouth of Depsang Bulge, where the Raki Nala and Depsang Nala meet, claiming it to be Chinese territory. But, after a three-week standoff, they withdrew as a result of a diplomatic agreement with India. In 2015, China tried setting up a watch tower near Burtsa. Any threat to Depsang affects India's DS-DBO road. Initially India had stationed about 120 tanks in the SSN, and over the years this number has increased.

During the 2020 standoff, the Depsang Bulge was again mentioned as one of the areas where China extended its claims. It came to light that the Chinese troops had been blocking Indian patrols from proceeding along the Raki Nala valley near a location called "bottleneck" since 2017. After a resolution to the standoff at Pangong Lake in February 2021, it was reported that the Chinese started strengthening their positions at Depsang.

The new line being demanded by China amounted to a loss of 250 square kilometres of territory for India, while the loss from India's perception of the Line of Actual Control was 900 square kilometres.

== Sub Sector North ==
The Indian military's Subsector North (SSN) is east of Siachen Glacier, located between the Saser ridge on the southeastern side and the Saltoro Ridge on the Pakistani border. With regards to a two–front war for India, this area can provide for a linkage for Pakistan and China in Ladakh. The territorial wedge created by Depsang Plains–Karakoram Pass–Shyok Valley prevents this territorial linkup.

== See also ==
- Tianwendian
- Daulat Beg Oldi
- Sino-Indian border dispute
- India-China Border Roads
- List of locations in Aksai Chin

== Bibliography ==
- Bhattacharji, Romesh (2012), Ladakh: Changing, Yet Unchanged, New Delhi: Rupa Publications – via Academia.edu
- Filippi, Filippo de (1932), The Italian Expedition to the Himalaya, Karakoram and Eastern Turkestan (1913-1914), London: Edward Arnold & Co. – via archive.org
- Fisher, Margaret Welpley; Rose, Leo E.; Huttenback, Robert A. (1963). Himalayan Battleground: Sino-Indian Rivalry in Ladakh. Praeger.
- Hoffmann, Steven A. (1990), India and the China Crisis, University of California Press, ISBN 978-0-520-06537-6
- Hudson, Geoffrey Francis (1963). "The Aksai Chin". Far Eastern Affairs. Chatto & Windus.
- Kapadia, Harish (1994). High Himalayas, Unknown Valleys (Second ed.). Indus Publishing. ISBN 81-85182-87-6 – via archive.org.
  - Kapadia, Harish (2002), High Himalaya Unknown Valleys (Fourth ed.), Indus Publishing, ISBN 978-81-7387-117-7
- Kapadia, Harish (2005), Into the Untravelled Himalaya: Travels, Treks, and Climbs, Indus Publishing, ISBN 978-81-7387-181-8
- Karackattu, Joe Thomas (26 May 2020). "The corrosive compromise of the Sino-Indian border management framework: from Doklam to Galwan". Asian Affairs. 51 (3): 590–604. doi:10.1080/03068374.2020.1804726. S2CID 222093756.
- Mehra, Parshotam (1992), An "agreed" frontier: Ladakh and India's northernmost borders, 1846-1947, Oxford University Press, ISBN 978-0-19-562758-9
- Raghavan, S. (27 August 2010). War and Peace in Modern India. Palgrave Macmillan UK. ISBN 978-0-230-24215-9.
- Sandhu, P. J. S.; Shankar, Vinay; Dwivedi, G. G. (2015), 1962: A View from the Other Side of the Hill, Vij Books India Pvt Ltd, ISBN 978-93-84464-37-0
- van Eekelen, Willem Frederik (1967). Indian Foreign Policy and the Border Dispute with China. Springer Netherlands. ISBN 978-94-017-6436-0.
