= Auto rickshaw =

Motorized version of a rickshaw

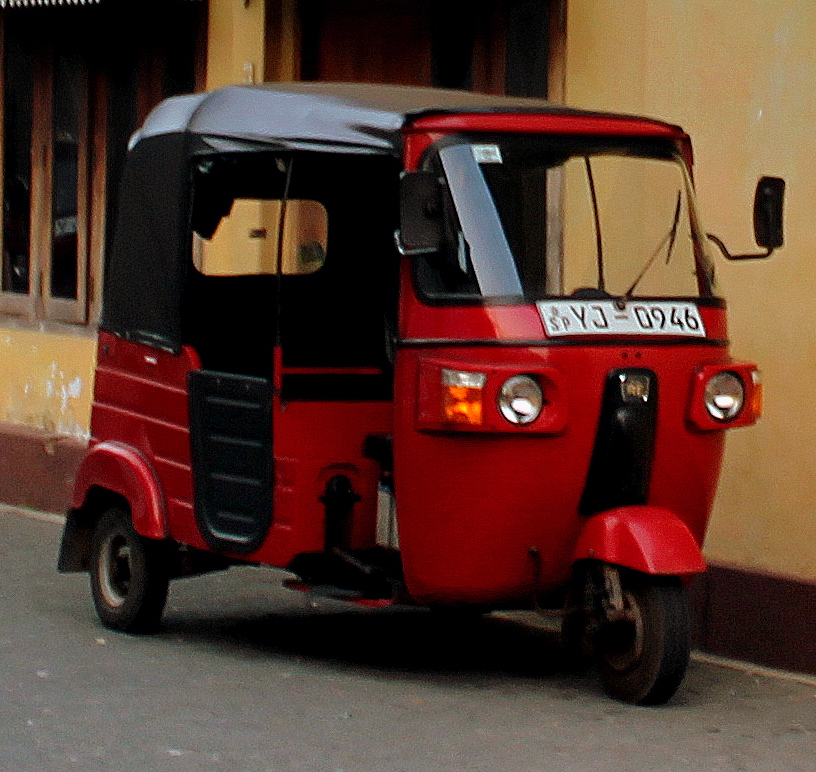
A typical auto rickshaw in Sri Lanka

An auto rickshaw is a motorized version of the pulled rickshaw or cycle rickshaw. Often called a tuk tuk, it is usually a three-wheeled vehicle, powered by an engine. They use a variety of fuels, with the most common being petrol, compressed natural gas, liquefied petroleum gas, and electricity. They are known by many names in many countries.

The auto rickshaw is a common form of transport around the world (especially in South Asian countries like India and Pakistan) both as a vehicle for hire and private use. They are especially common in countries with tropical or subtropical climate since they are usually not fully enclosed, and in many developing countries because they are relatively inexpensive to own and operate.

There are different auto rickshaw designs. The most common type used for passenger transport is characterized by a sheet-metal body resting on three wheels with a canvas roof and drop-down side curtains. The driver is seated in a small cabin at the front and operates handlebar controls with a space for carrying up to three passengers in the back. The cargo versions might have an open space at the rear. A simpler version might have an expanded sidecar mounted on a three wheeled motorcycle.

As of 2023, India is the largest market for electric auto rickshaws, surpassing China. As of 2024, Bajaj Auto of India is the world's largest auto rickshaw manufacturer.

== Origin ==
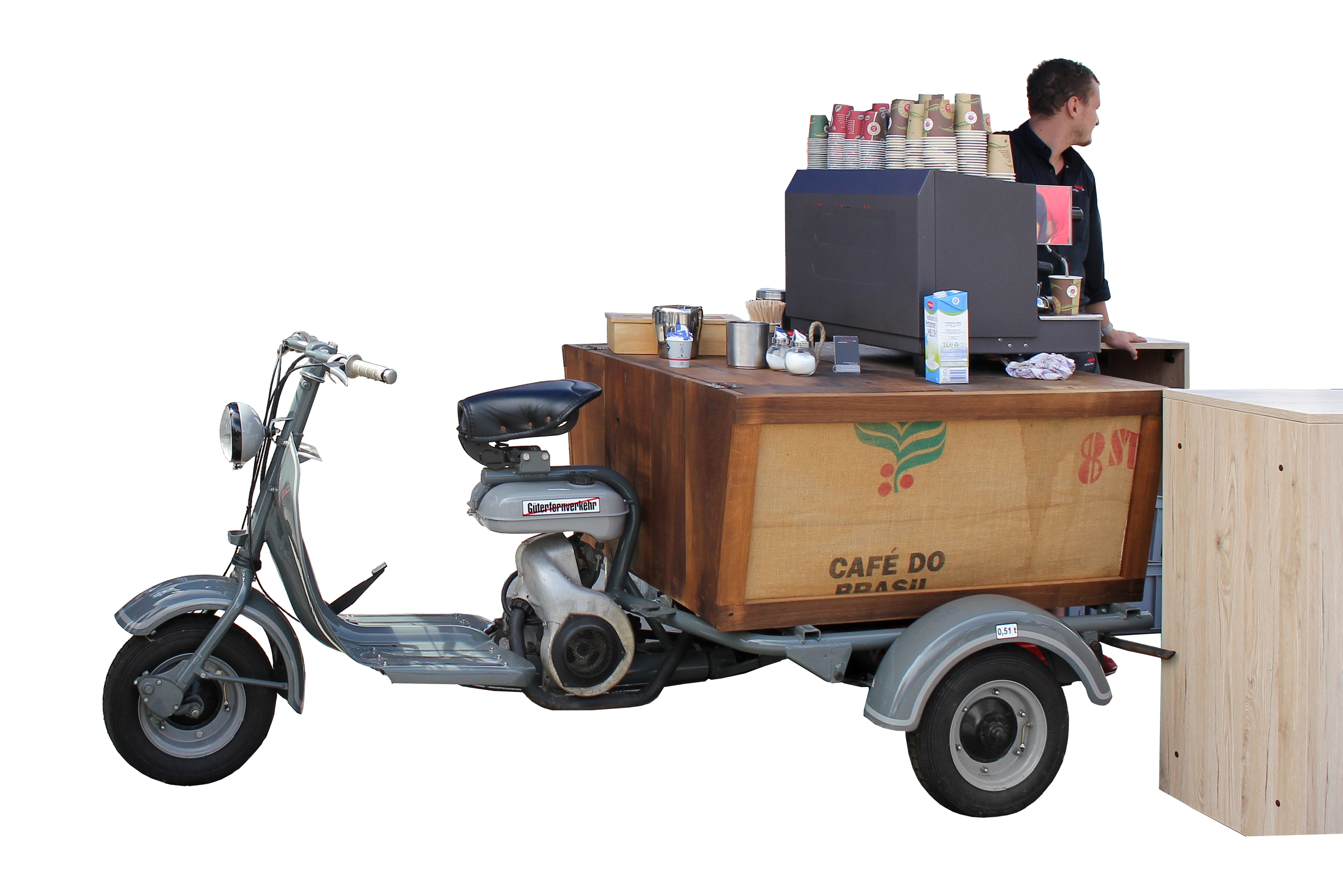
A 1952 Lambretta FD sold as open top model

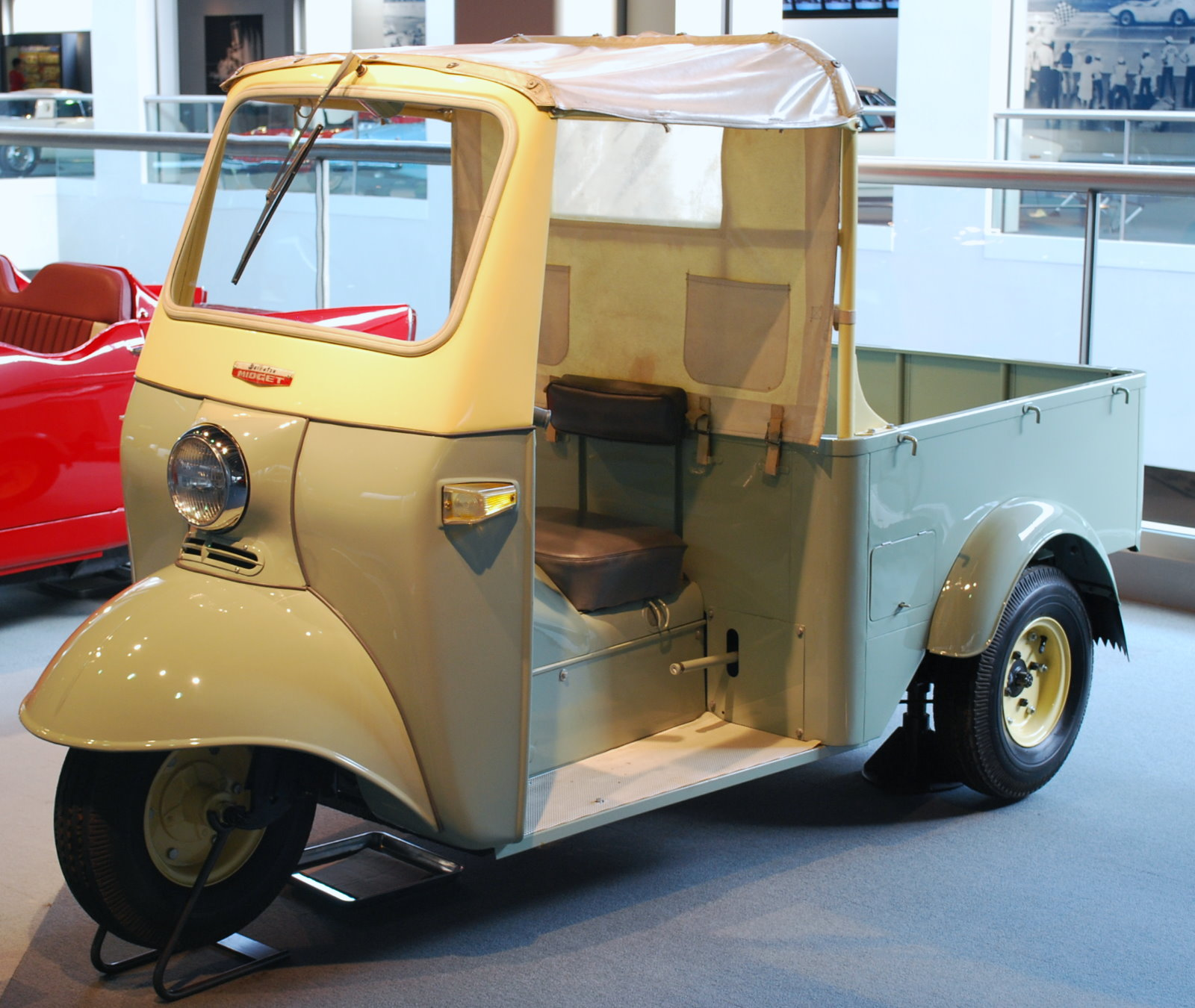
Daihatsu Midget Model DKA

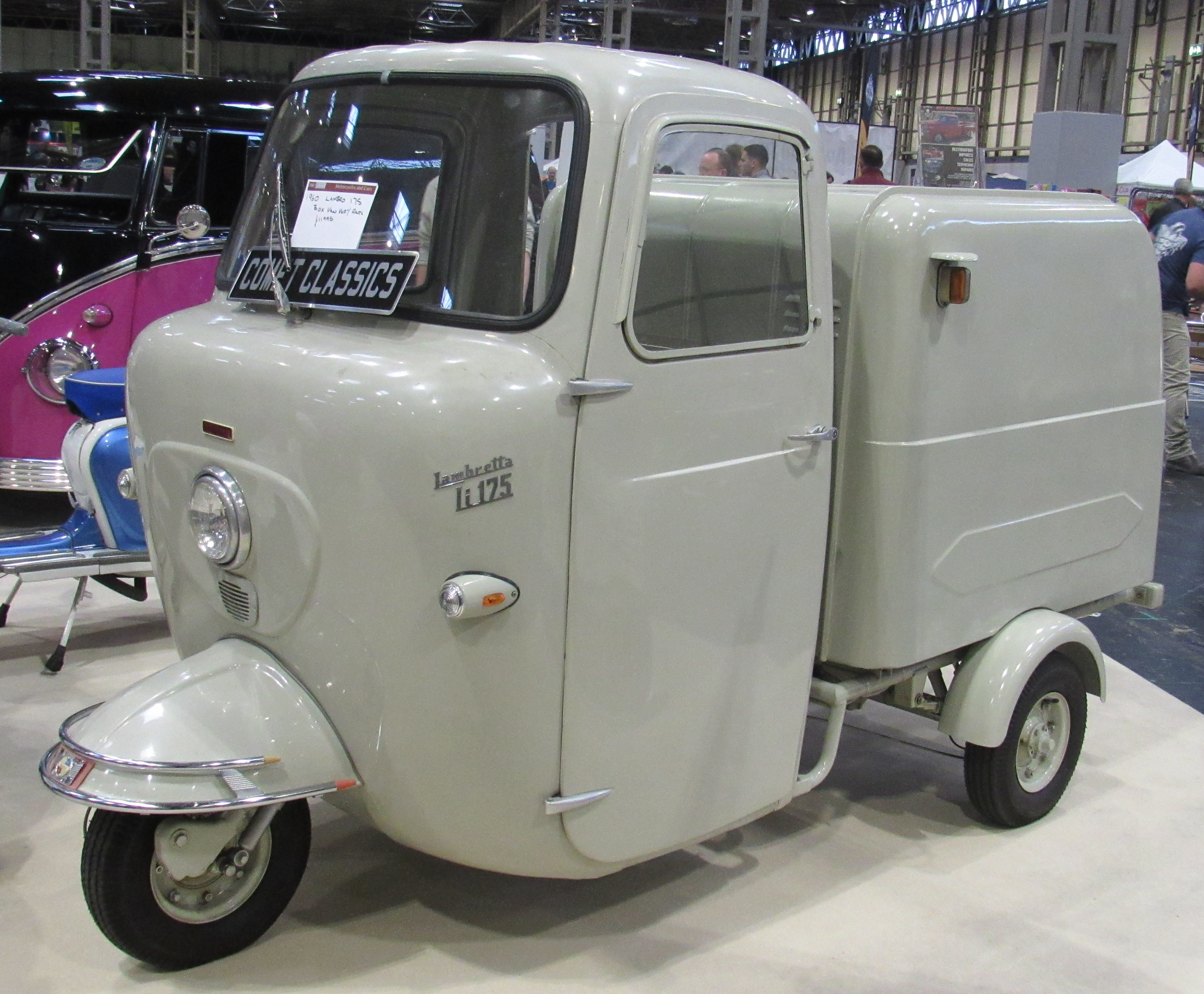
1960 Lambretta Li 175 Series 2

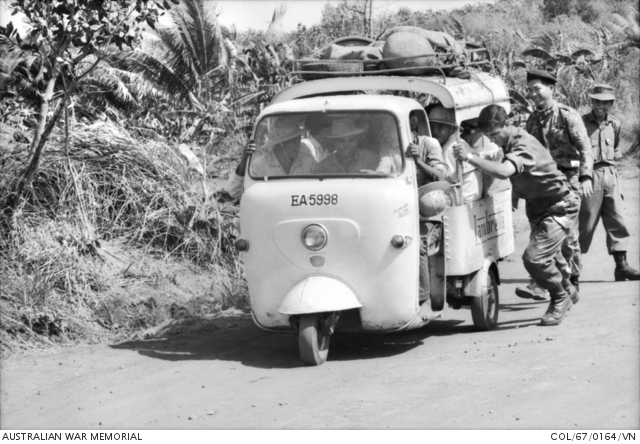
RAR soldier helps push-start a Lambretta at Nui Dat

In the 1930s Japan, which was the most industrialized country in Asia at the time, encouraged the development of motorized vehicles including less expensive three-wheeled vehicles based on motorcycles. The Mazda-Go, a 3-wheel open "truck" released in 1931, is often considered the first of what became auto rickshaws. Later that decade the Japanese Ministry of Posts and Telecommunications of Japan distributed about 20,000 used three-wheelers to Southeast Asia as part of efforts to expand its influence in the region. They became popular in some areas, especially Thailand, which developed local manufacturing and design after the Japanese government abolished the three-wheeler license in Japan in 1965.

Production in Southeast Asia started from the knockdown production of the Daihatsu Midget, which was introduced in 1959. An exception is the indigenously modified Philippine tricycle, which originates from the Rikuo Type 97 motorcycle with a sidecar, introduced to the islands in 1941 by the Imperial Japanese Army during World War II.

In Asia, Corradino D'Ascanio, aircraft designer at Piaggio and inventor of the Vespa, came up with the idea of building a light three-wheeled commercial vehicle to power Italy's post-war economic reconstruction. The Piaggio Ape followed suit in 1947. Innocenti, another leading Scooter manufacturer, also came up with their Lambretta line of three wheelers in a cargo version, later adopted as a passenger version by its Indian colloborator Automobile Products of India.

== Regional variations ==
=== Africa and the Middle East ===
==== Egypt ====
Locally named the "tuktuk", the rickshaw is used as a means of transportation in most parts of Egypt. It is generally rare to find in some affluent and newer parts of cities such as New Cairo and Heliopolis; and on highways due to police control and enforcement.

==== Gaza ====
Together with the 2010 boom of recreational facilities in Gaza for the local residents, donkey carts have all but been displaced by tuk-tuks in 2010. Due to the ban by Egypt and Israel on the import of most motorised vehicles, the tuk-tuks have had to be smuggled in parts through the tunnel network connecting Gaza with Egypt.

==== Iraq ====
Due to extreme congestion in Baghdad and other Iraqi cities combined with the insensible cost of vehicles in relation to frequent violence, rickshaws have been imported from India in large numbers to provide taxi service and other purposes, in stark contrast to previous attitudes of the pre-U.S. 2003 invasion eras with rickshaws being disdained and sedans being held in high regard as a status symbol. Rickshaws have been noted for being instrumental in political protest revolts.

==== Kenya ====
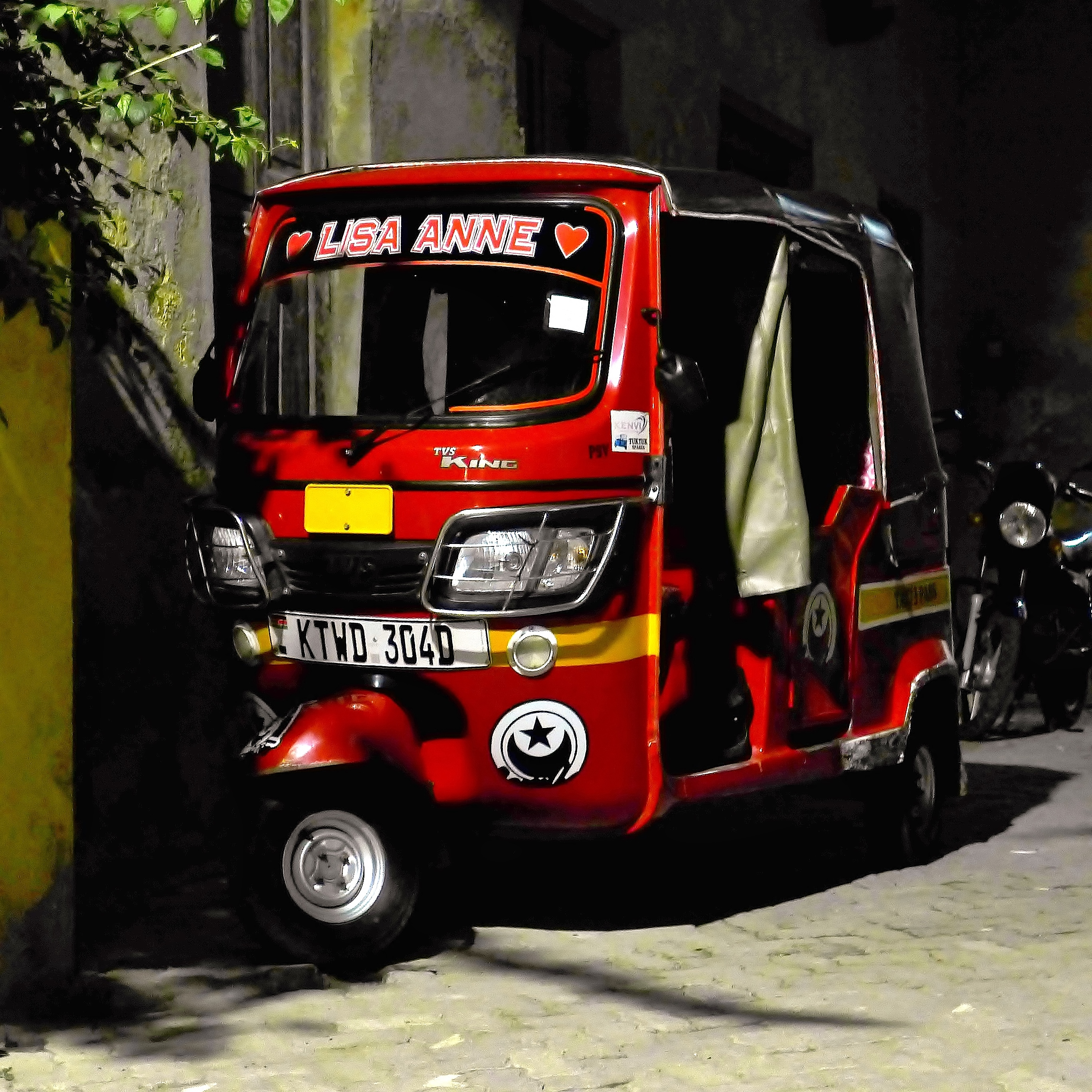
Tuk tuk in Mombasa, Kenya

Locally named 'Tuktuk', the rickshaw is used as a means of transportation in some parts of Kenya.

==== Madagascar ====
In Madagascar, man-powered rickshaws are a common form of transportation in a number of cities, especially Antsirabe. They are known as "posy" from pousse-pousse, meaning push-push. Cycle rickshaws took off since 2006 in a number of flat cities like Toamasina and replaced the major part of the posy, and are now threatened by the auto rickshaws, introduced in 2009. Provincial capitals like Toamasina, Mahajanga, Toliara, and Antsiranana are taking to them rapidly. They are known as "bajaji" in the north and "tuk-tuk" or "tik-tik" in the east, and are now licensed to operate as taxis. They are not yet allowed an operating licence in the congested, and more polluted national capital, Antananarivo.

==== Morocco ====
In Morocco, there are Auto-rickshaws in Rabat, Casablanca and Marrakesh.

==== Nigeria ====
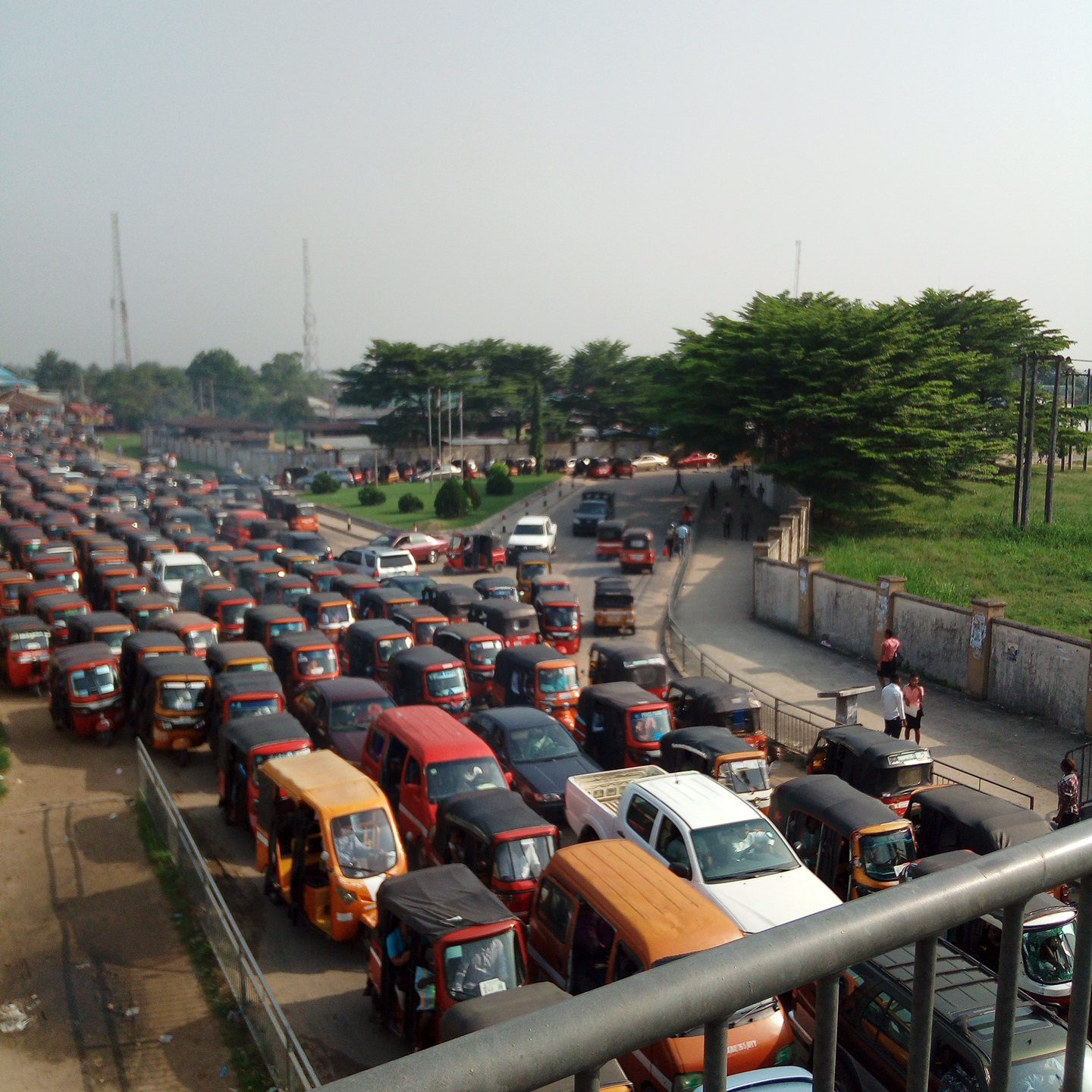
Aerial view of autorickshaw congestion from a pedestrian bridge in Uyo, Southeast Nigeria

The auto rickshaw is used to provide transportation in cities all over Nigeria. Popularity and use varies across the country. In Lagos, for example, the "keke" (Yoruba for bicycle) is regulated and transportation around the state's highways is prohibited while in Kano it's popularly known as "Adaidaita Sahu", in Abuja "FCT" and also Northern Nigeria it is called "keke napep".

==== South Africa ====
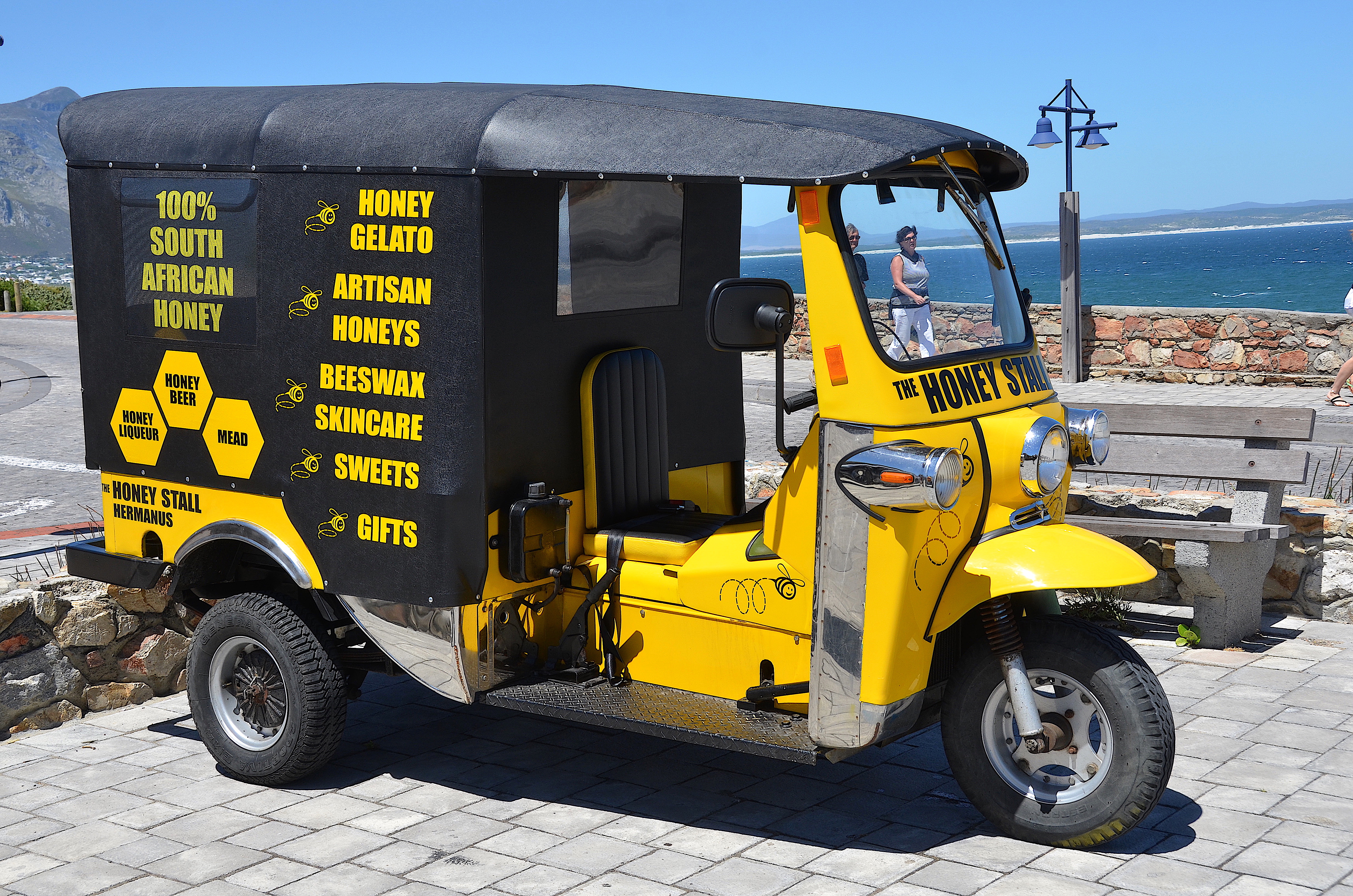
Tuk-Tuk in Hermanus, South Africa (2014)

Tuk-tuks, introduced in Durban in the late 1980s, have enjoyed growing popularity in recent years, particularly in Gauteng. In Cape Town they are used to deliver groceries and, more recently, transport tourists.

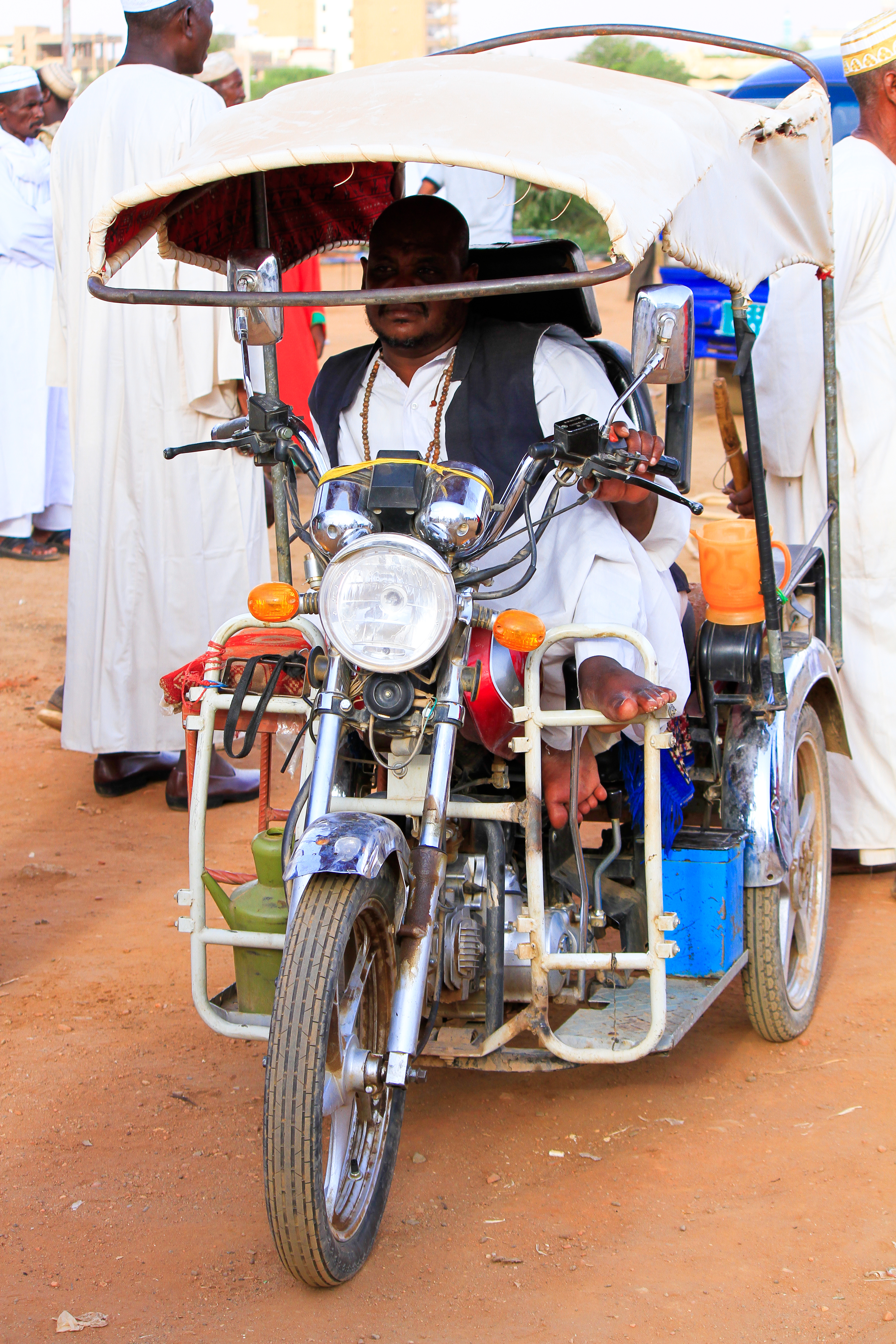
Rickshaw in Omdurman, Sudan

==== Sudan ====
Rickshaws, known as "Raksha" in Sudan, are the most common means of transportation, followed by the bus, in the capital Khartoum.

==== Tanzania ====
Locally known as "bajaji", they are a common mode of transportation in Dar es Salaam, and many other cities and villages.

==== Uganda ====
A local delivery company called as Sokowatch in 2020 began a pilot project using electric tuk-tuks, to cut pollution.

==== Zimbabwe ====
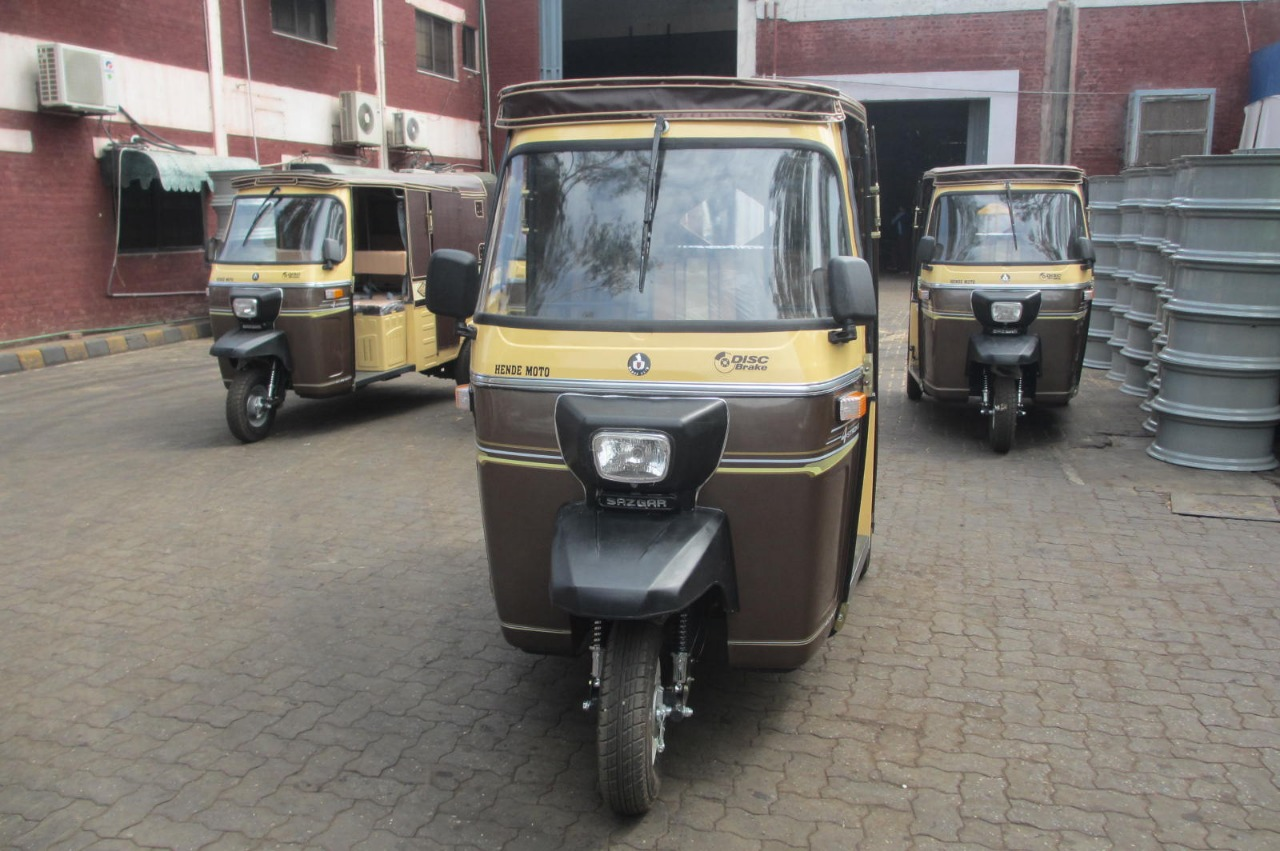
Hende Moto electric 3-wheeler, Zimbabwe

Hende Moto EV & Taxi company was founded in 2019 by Devine Mafa, an American-Zimbabwean businessman. Hende Moto taxis were first introduced in Zimbabwe as the first vehicle manufactured by Zimbabwean three-wheeler manufacturing company Hende Moto Pvt Ltd. The first Hende Moto Taxi was introduced in Kwekwe in August 2019, and thereafter in Victoria Falls City and then Harare in 2019. Hende Moto is also the manufacturer of the first Zimbabwean-made electric passenger three-wheeled vehicle. It operates on a lithium-ion battery that has a range of 70 miles on a 6-hour charge.

=== South Asia ===
==== Afghanistan ====
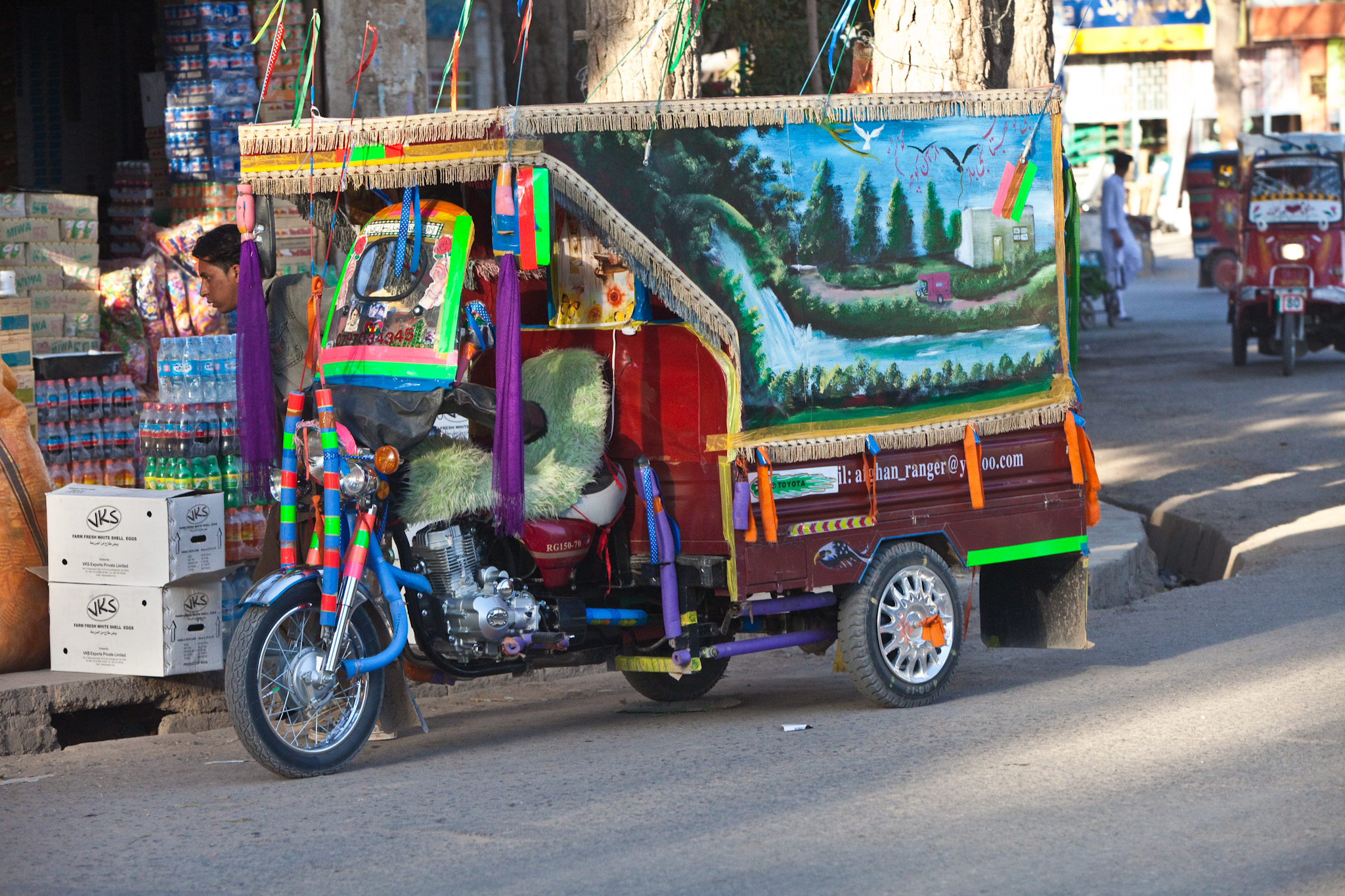
A tuk-tuk in Herat, Afghanistan

Auto rickshaws are very common in the eastern Afghan city of Jalalabad, where they are popularly decorated in art and colors. They are also popular in the northern city of Kunduz.

==== Bangladesh ====
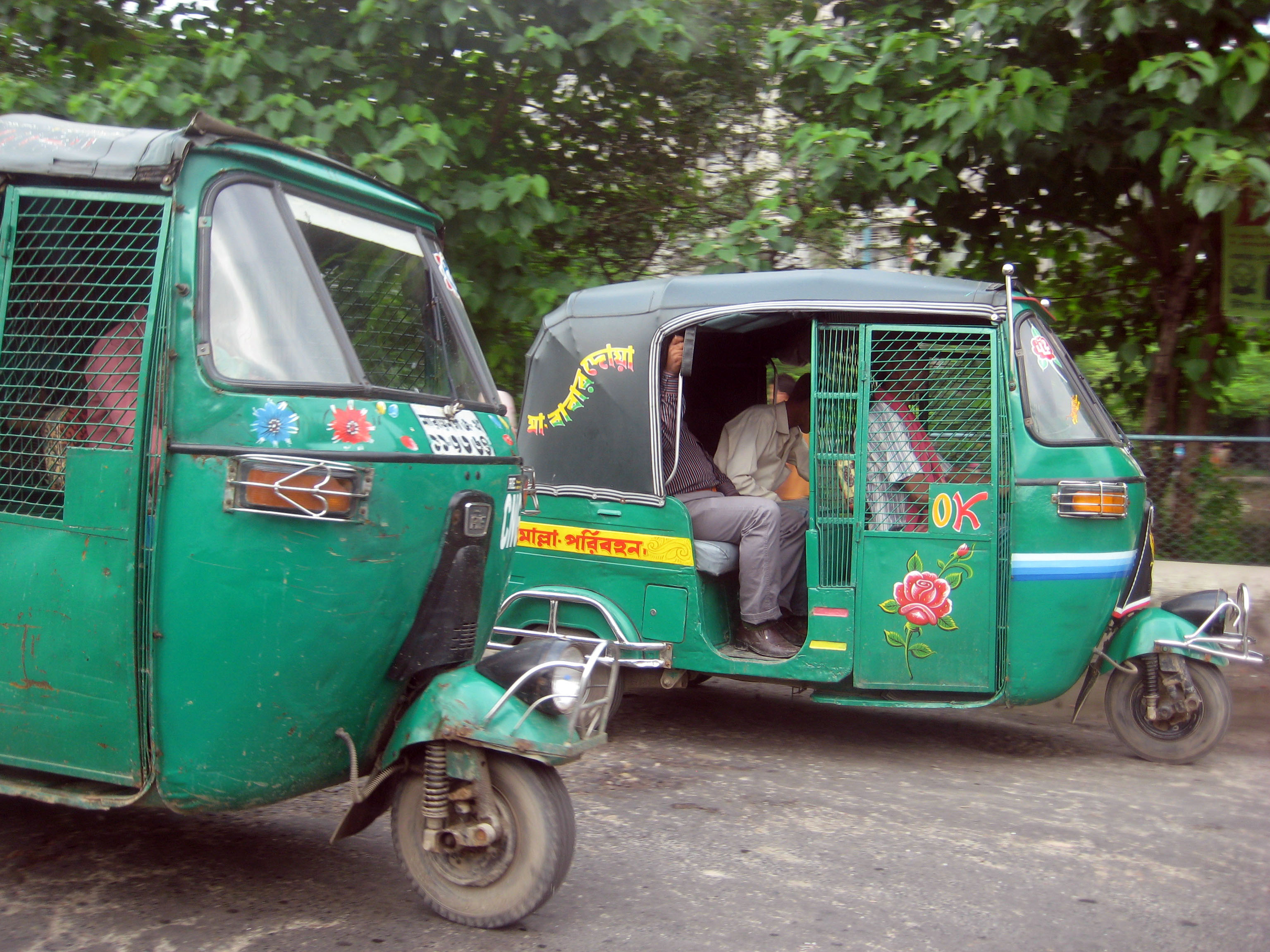
"CNGs" in Dhaka, Bangladesh

Auto rickshaws (locally called "baby taxis" or "CNGs" for those running on compressed natural gas) are one of the more popular modes of transport in Bangladesh mainly due to their size and speed. They are best suited to narrow, crowded streets, and are thus the principal means of covering longer distances within urban areas.

Two-stroke engines had been identified as one of the leading sources of air pollution in Dhaka. Thus, since January 2003, traditional auto rickshaws were banned from the capital; only the new natural gas-powered models (CNG) were permitted to operate within the city limits. All CNGs are painted green to signify that the vehicles are eco-friendly and that each one has a meter built-in.

As of 2025, auto rickshaws in Bangladesh are predominantly electric. There were around 4 million unregistered electric auto rickshaws circulating in Bangladesh by 2025, up from 200,000 in 2016. They constitute "perhaps the world’s biggest informal EV fleet."

==== India ====
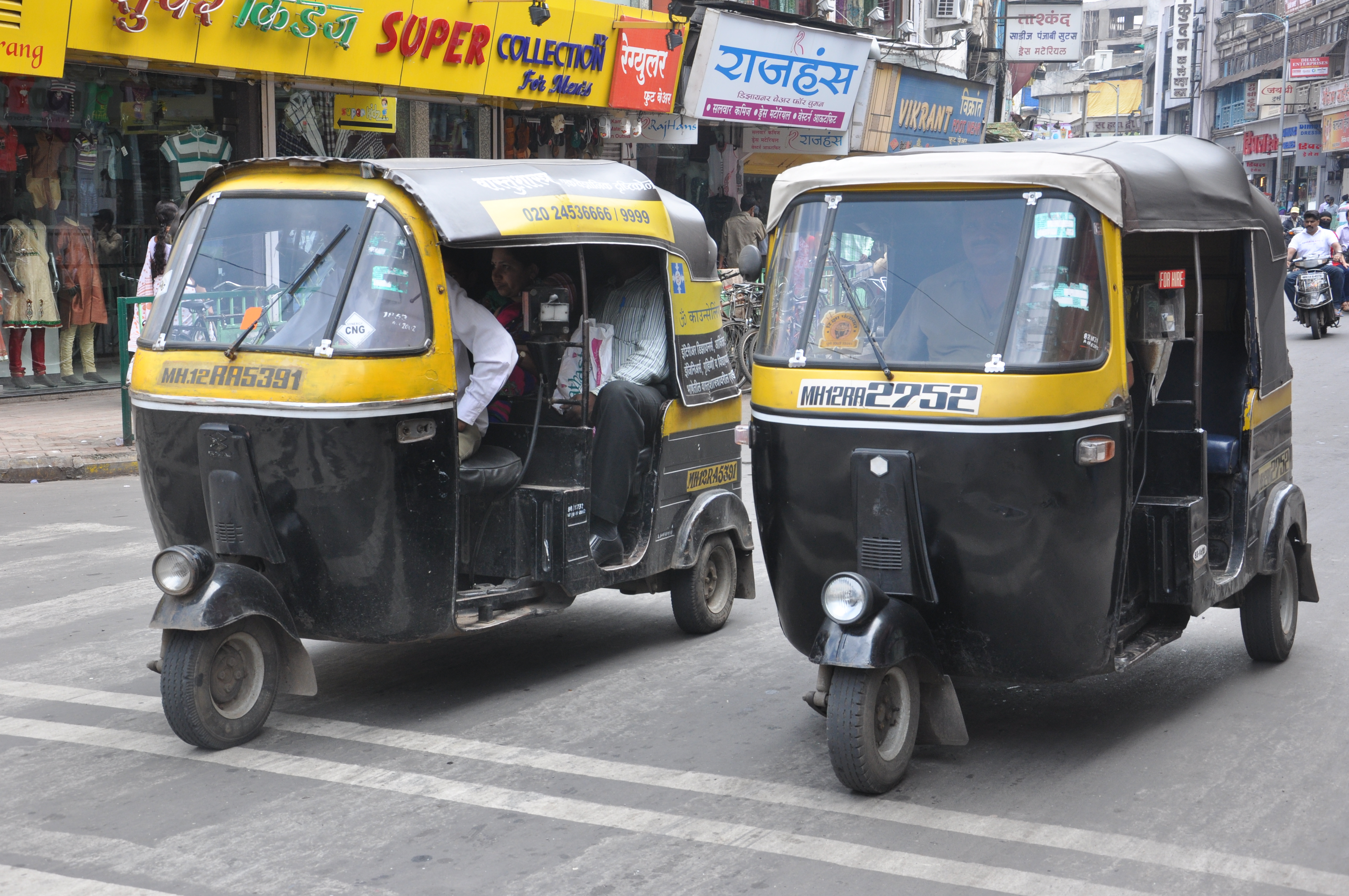
Auto rickshaws in Pune, India

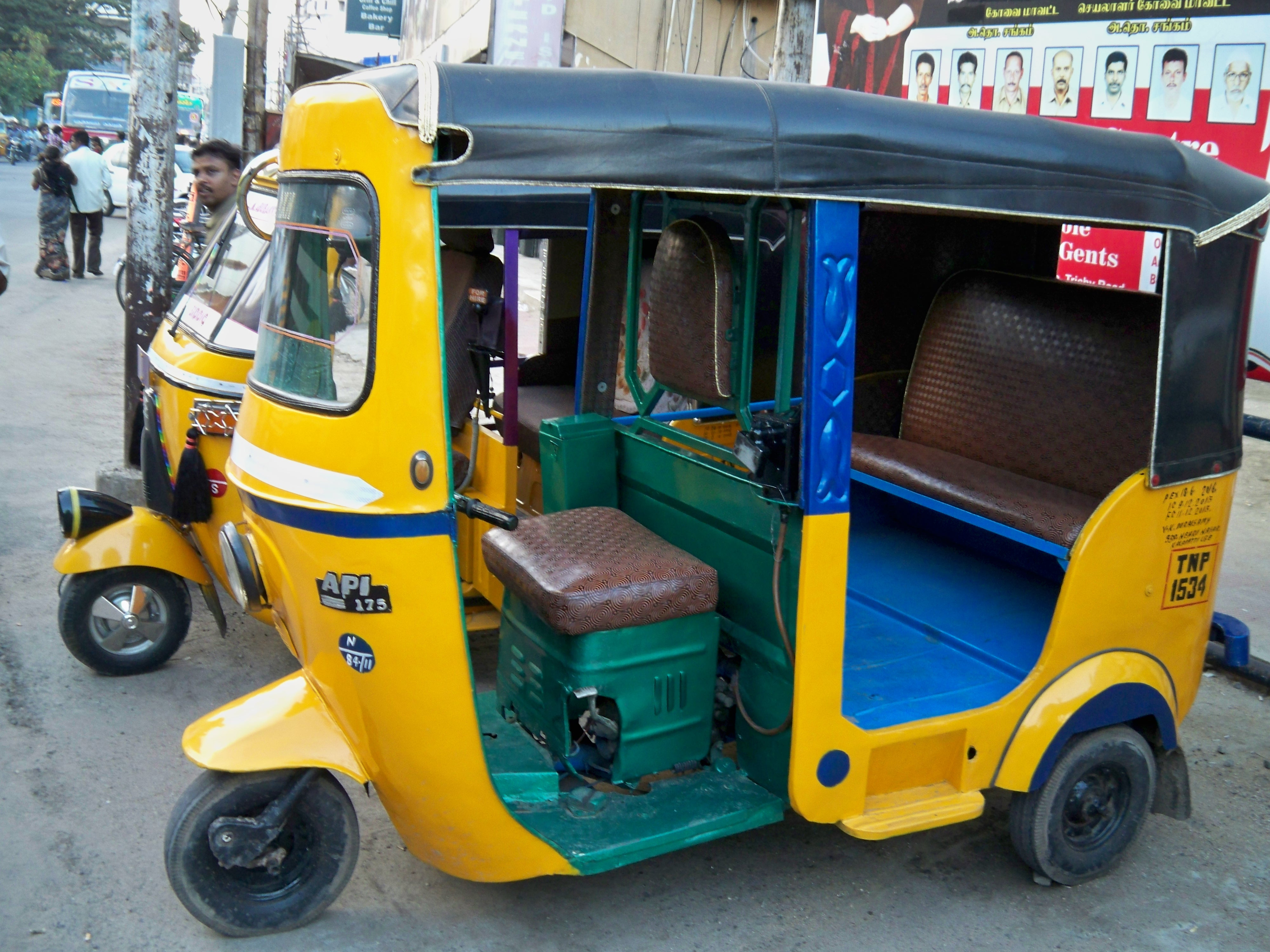
API 175 Lambretta Auto sold from 50's till the late 90's

Most cities offer auto rickshaw services, although cycle rickshaws and hand-pulled rickshaws are also available but rarely in certain remote areas, as all other cities began using auto rickshaws. Many state governments have launched an initiative of women-friendly rickshaw service called the Pink Rickshaws driven by women. The drivers are known as the "Rickshaw-wallah", auto-wallah, tuktuk-wallah or auto-kaaran in places like Tamil Nadu/Kerala. Auto-rickshaws are also known as tempos in some parts of India.

Auto rickshaws are used in cities and towns for short distances; they are less suited to long distances because they are slow and the carriages are open to air pollution. Auto rickshaws (often called "autos") provide cheap and efficient transportation. Modern auto rickshaws run on electricity as the government pushes for e-mobility through its FAME-II scheme, compressed natural gas (CNG) and liquified petroleum gas (LPG) due to government regulations and are environmentally friendly compared to full-sized cars. (Note: Typical fuel economy for an Indian-made auto rickshaw is around 35 kilometres per litre (99 mpg_{‑imp}; 82 mpg_{‑US}) of petrol.)

To augment the speedy movement of traffic, auto rickshaws are not allowed in the southern part of the Mumbai.

India is the location of the annual Rickshaw Run.

There are two types of auto rickshaws in India. In older versions the engines were below the driver's seat, while in newer versions engines are in the rear. They normally run on petrol, CNG, or diesel. The seating capacity of a normal rickshaw is four, including the driver's seat. Six-seater rickshaws exist in different parts of the country, but the model was officially banned in the city of Pune on 10 January 2003 by the Regional Transport Authority (RTA).

Apart from this, modern electric auto rickshaws, which operate on electric motors and offer high torque and loading capacity with better speed, are also gaining popularity in India. Many auto drivers have switched to electric three-wheelers due to the high prices of CNG and diesel, making traditional auto rickshaws much more expensive compared to their electric counterparts. The government is also taking steps to convert existing CNG and diesel rickshaws to electric models.

CNG autos in many cities (e.g. Delhi, Agra) are distinguishable from the earlier petrol-powered autos by a green and yellow livery, as opposed to the earlier black and yellow appearance. In other cities (such as Mumbai) the only distinguishing feature is the 'CNG' print found on the back or side of the auto. Some local governments are considering four-stroke engines instead of two-stroke versions.

Notable auto rickshaw manufacturers in India include Bajaj Auto, Mahindra & Mahindra, Piaggio Ape, Atul Auto, Kerala Automobiles Limited, TVS Motors and Force Motors.

In Delhi there also used to be a variant powered by a Harley-Davidson engine called the phat-phati, because of the sound it made. The story goes that shortly after the Independence of India, a stock of Harley-Davidson motorbikes that had been used by British troops during World War II were found to be left behind in a military storage house in Delhi. Drivers purchased these bikes, added on a gear box (probably from a Willys jeep), welded on a passenger compartment that was good for four to six passengers, and put the unconventional vehicles onto the roads. A 1998 ruling of the Supreme Court against the use of polluting vehicles finally signed the death warrant of Delhi's phat-phatis.

As of 2022, India has about 2.4 million battery-powered, three-wheeled rickshaws on its roads. Some 11,000 new ones hit the streets each month, creating a US$3.1 billion market. Manufacturers include Mahindra & Mahindra Ltd. and Kinetic Engineering. A prerequisite for the adoption to electric vehicles is the availability of charging stations; as of early 2024, India had 12,146 public EV charging stations operational across the country.

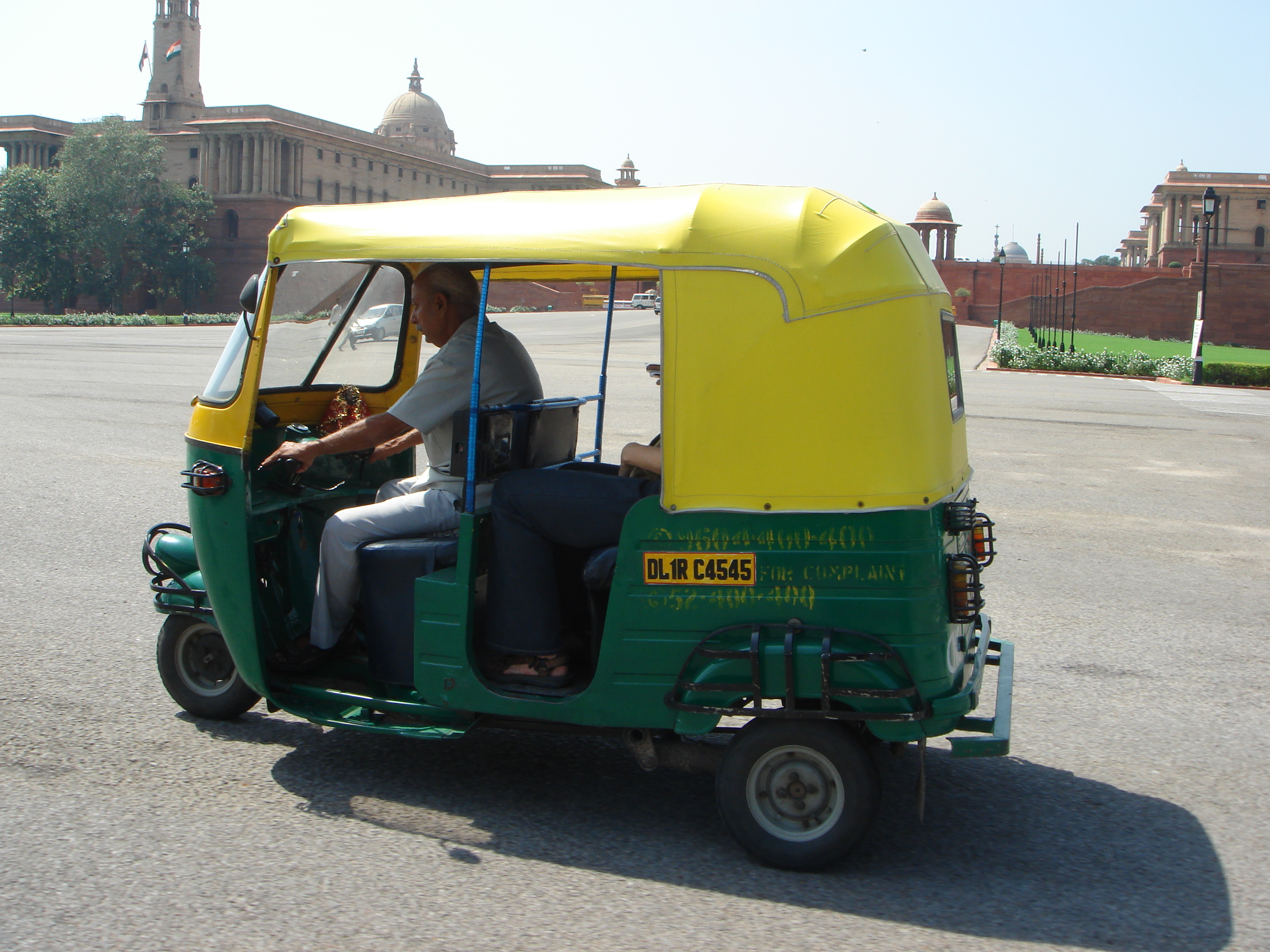
CNG green auto rickshaw in New Delhi

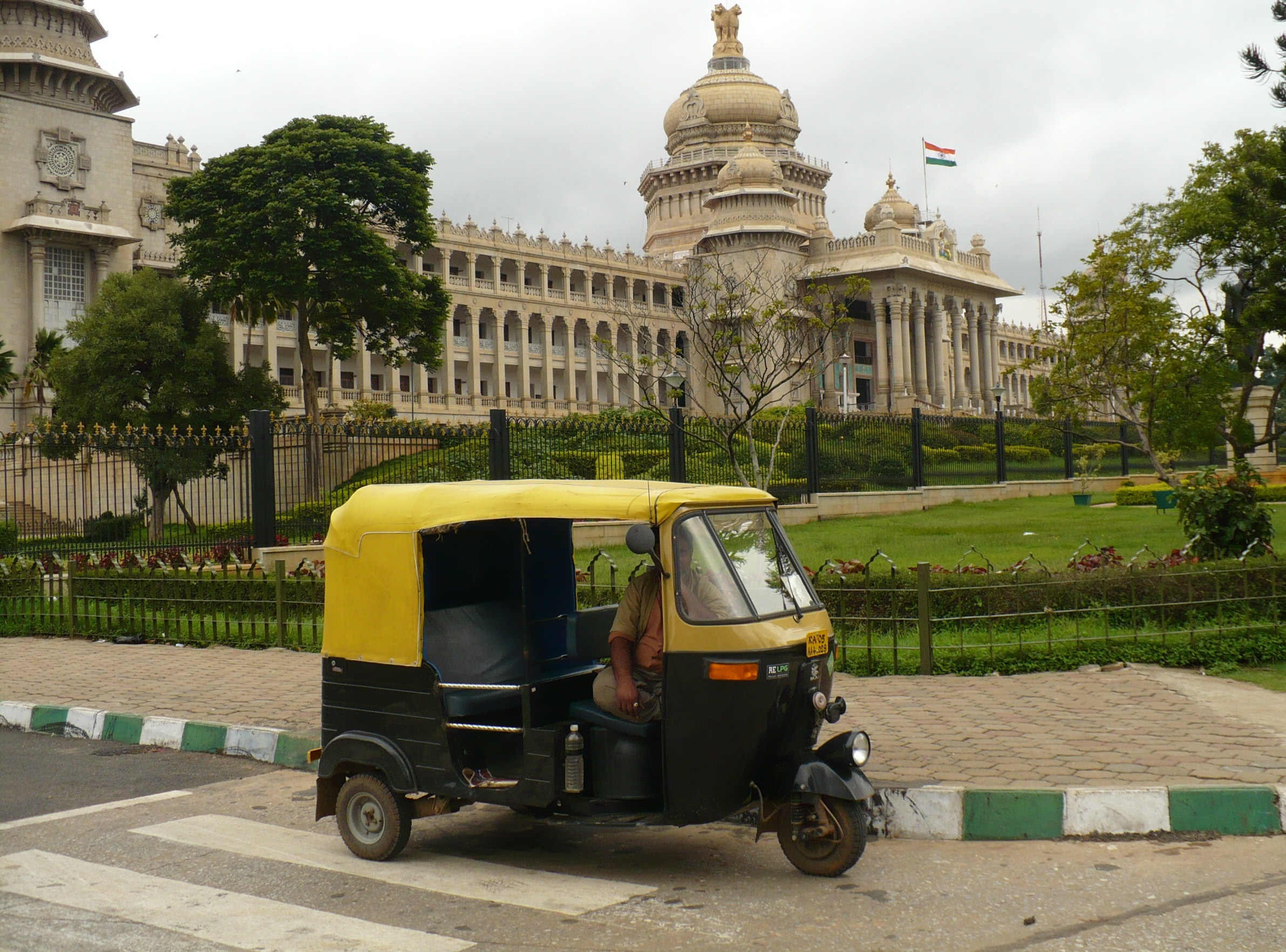
A Bajaj Auto rickshaw in Bangalore

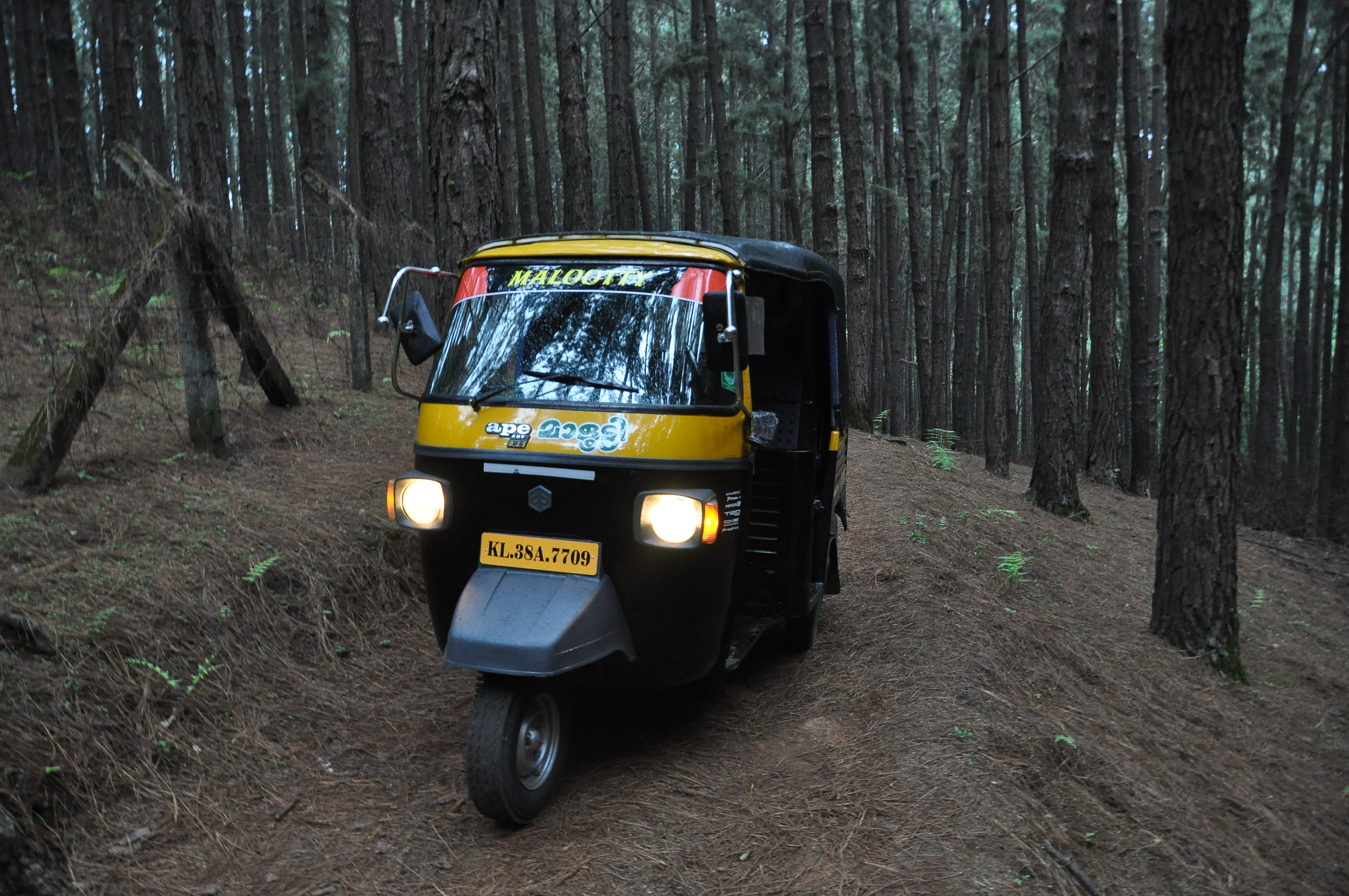
A Piaggio Ape auto rickshaw in Kerala

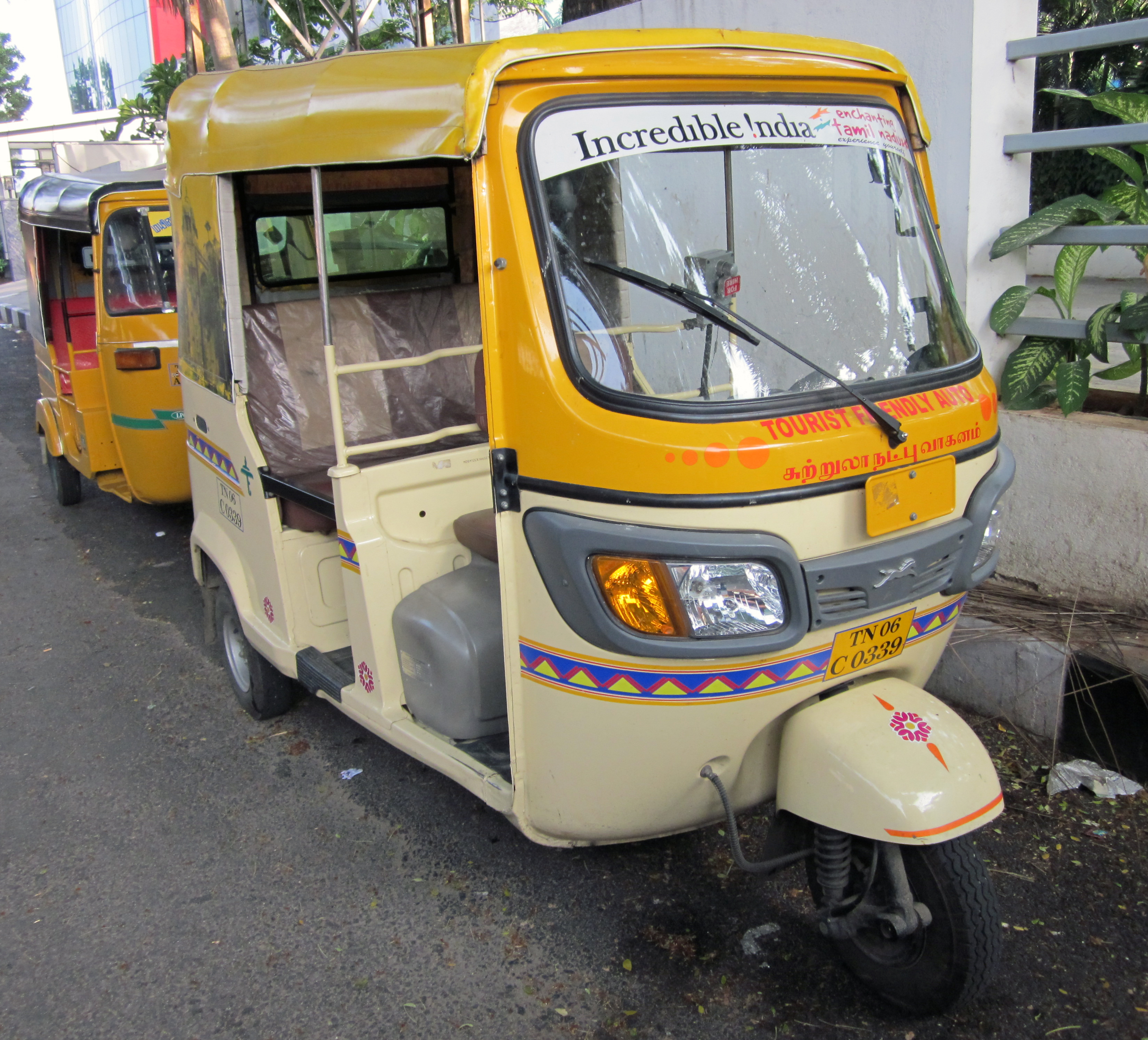
A TVS auto rickshaw in Chennai

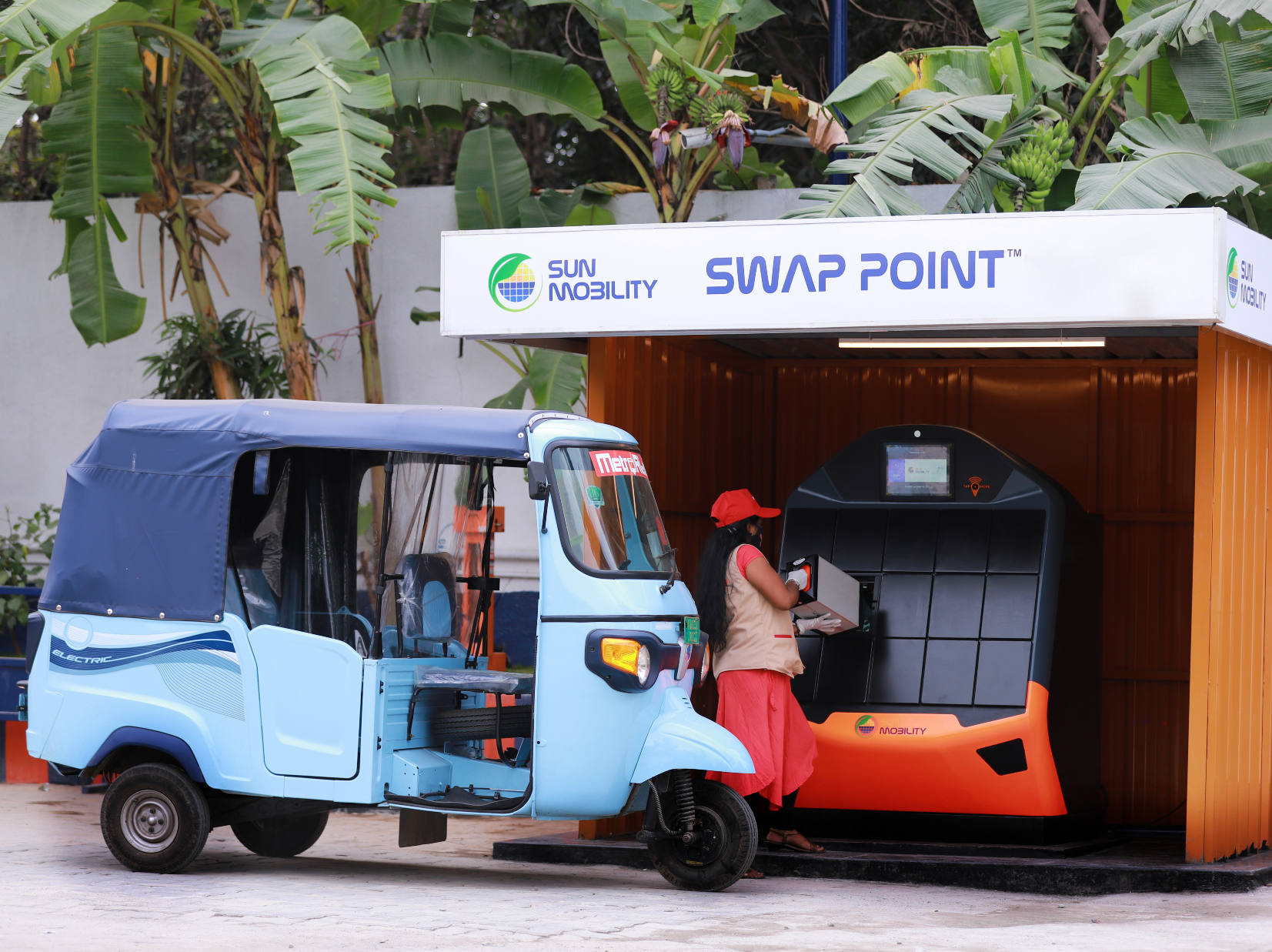
An electric rickshaw at a battery swapping point

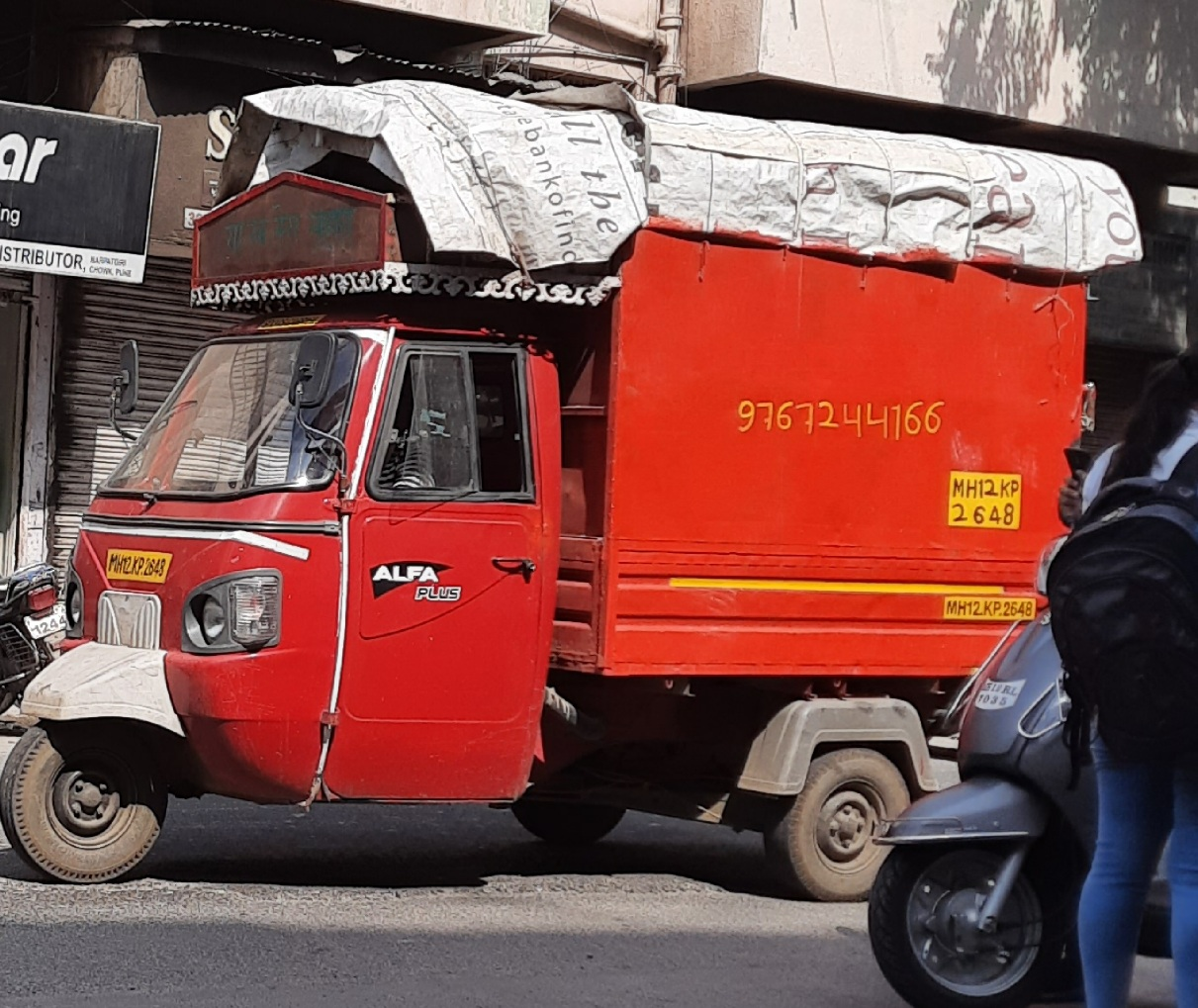
Three wheeler cargo auto-rickshaw used in India

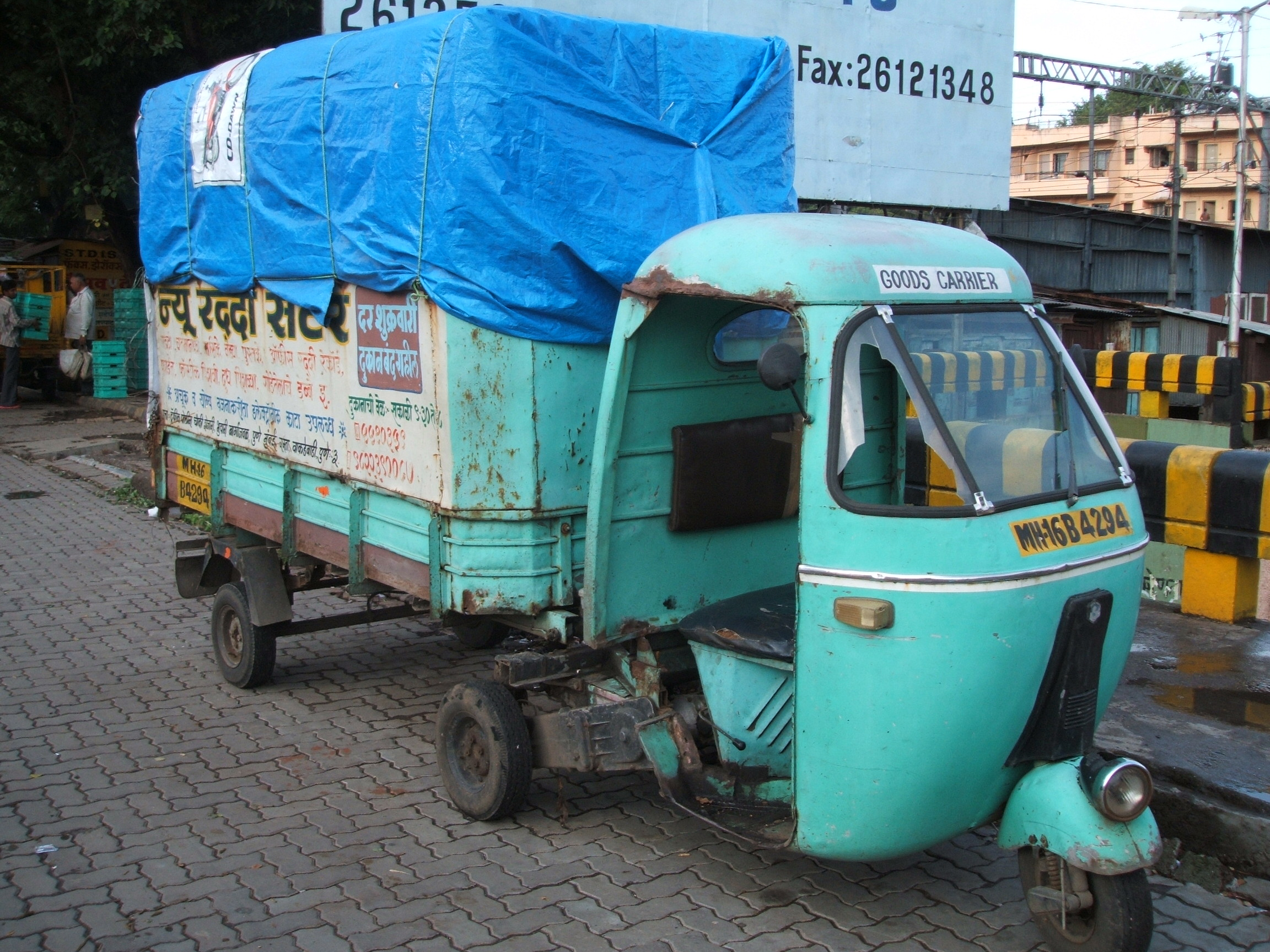
Indian auto-rickshaw adapted with trailer

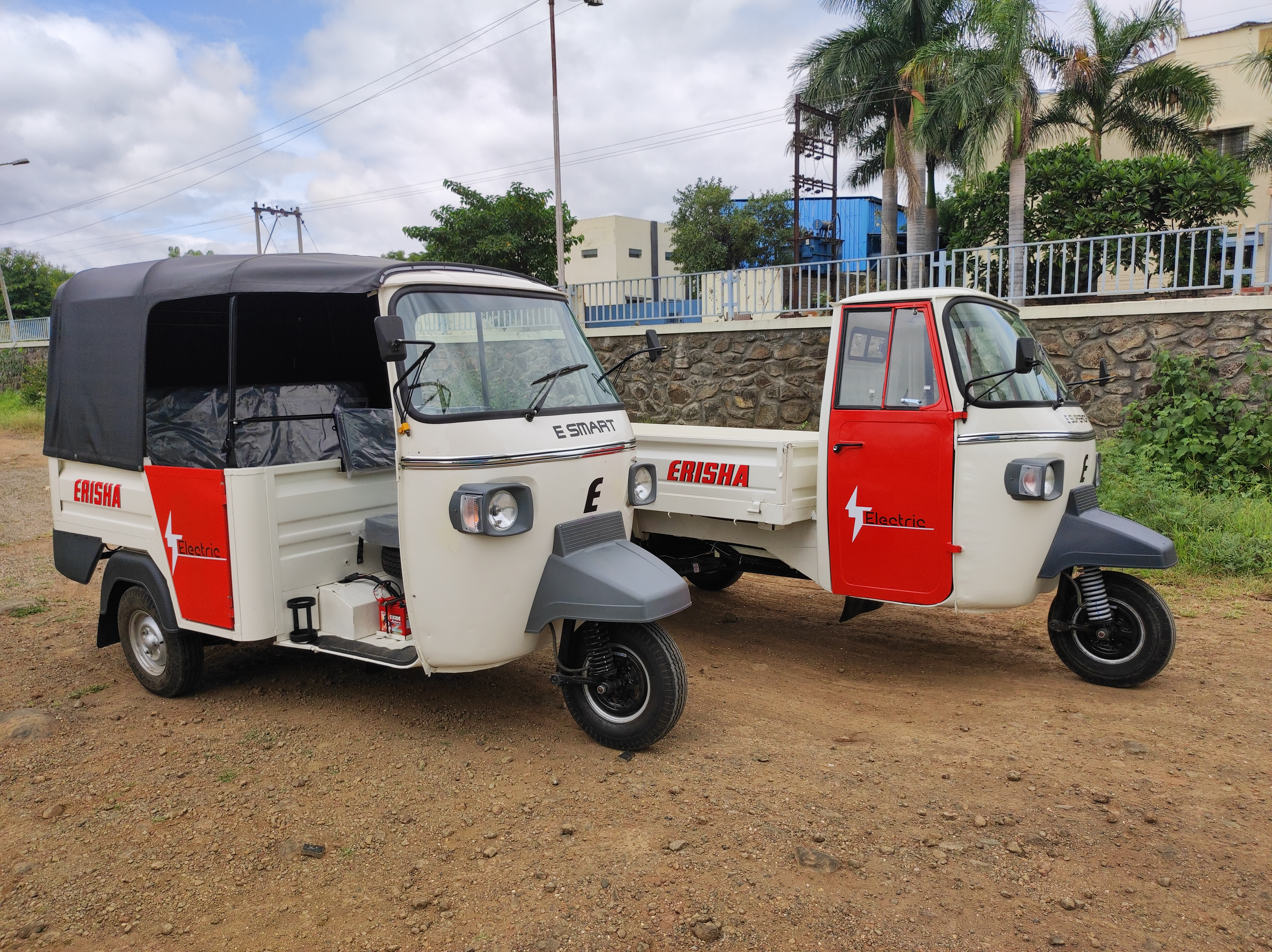
Erisha electric passenger and cargo Auto rickshaws in India

Generally, rickshaw fares are controlled by the government, however auto (and taxi) driver unions frequently go on strike demanding fare hikes. They have also gone on strike multiple times in Delhi to protest against the government and High Court's 2012 order to install GPS systems, and even though GPS installation in public transport was made mandatory in 2015, as of 2017 compliance remains very low.

The 200 cc variant of the Bajaj Auto auto rickshaw was used in the 2022 Rickshaw Run to set the record for the world's highest auto rickshaw, over the Umling La Pass, at 5,798 meters (19,022 feet)

==== Nepal ====
Auto rickshaws were a popular mode of transport in Nepal during the 1980s and 1990s, until the government banned the movement of 600 such vehicles in the early 2000s. The earliest auto rickshaws running in Kathmandu were manufactured by Bajaj Auto.

Nepal has been a popular destination for the Rickshaw Run. The 2009 Fall Run took place in Goa, India and ended in Pokhara, Nepal.

==== Pakistan ====
Auto rickshaws are a popular mode of transport in Pakistani towns and are mainly used for travelling short distances within cities. One of the major manufacturers of auto rickshaws is Piaggio. The government is taking measures to convert all gasoline powered auto rickshaws to cleaner CNG rickshaws by 2015. In relation to that, Environment Canada is implementing pilot projects in Lahore, Karachi, and Quetta with engine technology developed in Mississauga, Ontario, Canada that uses CNG instead of gasoline in two-stroke engines, in an effort to combat environmental pollution and noise levels. However, as CNG rickshaws became less popular, more expensive and inefficient, the government started promoting electric rickshaws instead by issuing easy loans through commercial banks in all the major cities of Pakistan.

In many cities in Pakistan, there are also motorcycle rickshaws, usually called "chand gari" (moon car) or "chingchi", after the Chinese company Jinan Qingqi Motorcycle Co. Ltd who first introduced these to the market.

There are many rickshaw manufacturers in Pakistan. Lahore is the hub of CNG auto rickshaw manufacturing. Manufacturers include: New Asia automobile Pvt, Ltd; AECO Export Company; STAHLCO Motors; Global Sources; Parhiyar Automobiles; Global Ledsys Technologies; Siwa Industries; Prime Punjab Automobiles; Murshid Farm Industries; Sazgar Automobiles; NTN Enterprises; and Imperial Engineering Company.

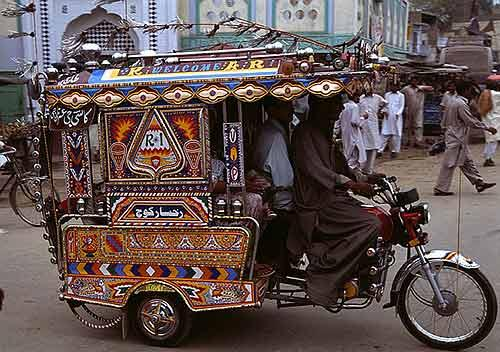
Chingchee in Pakistan

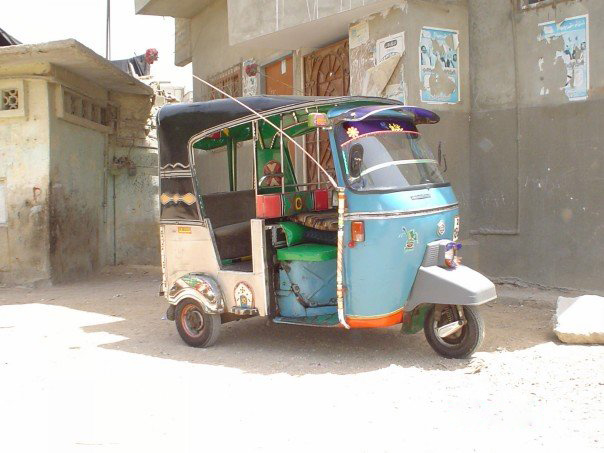
Auto rickshaw, Karachi

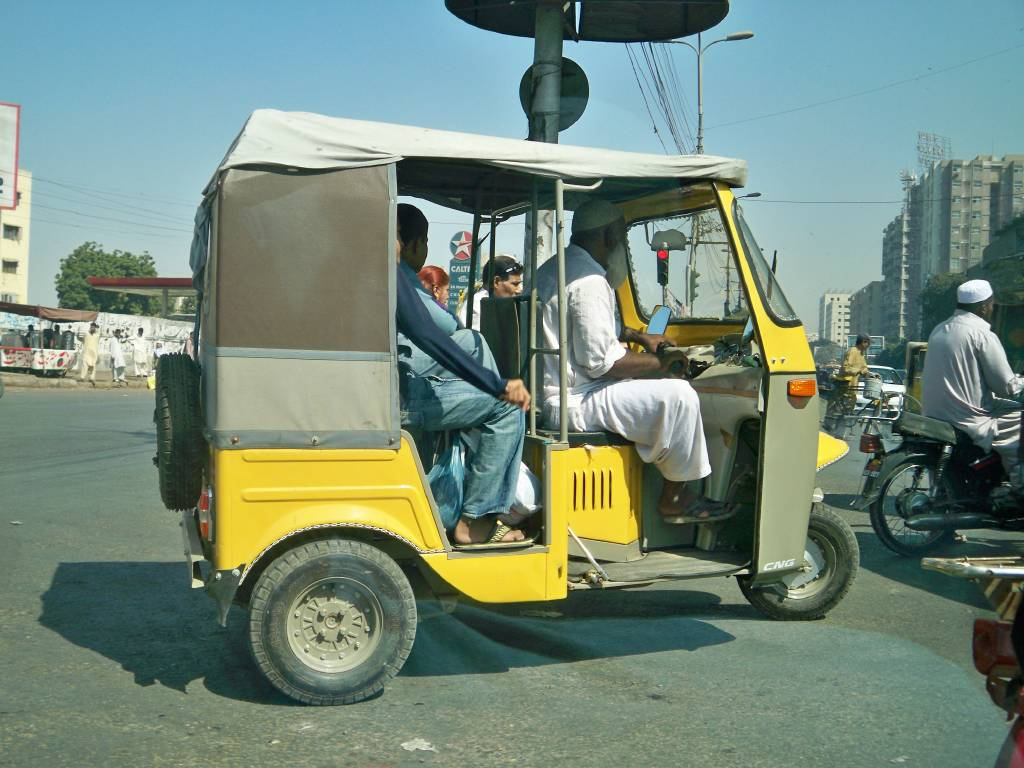
Auto rickshaw, Karachi

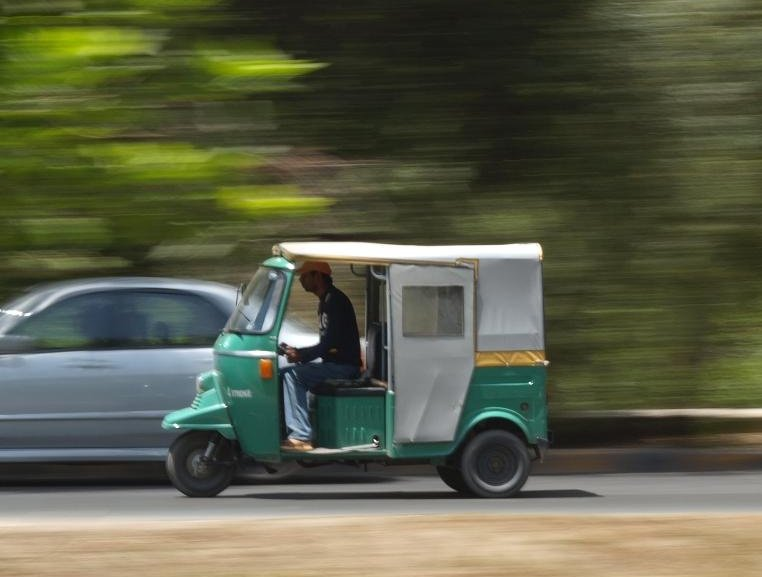
Auto rickshaw, Lahore

==== Sri Lanka ====
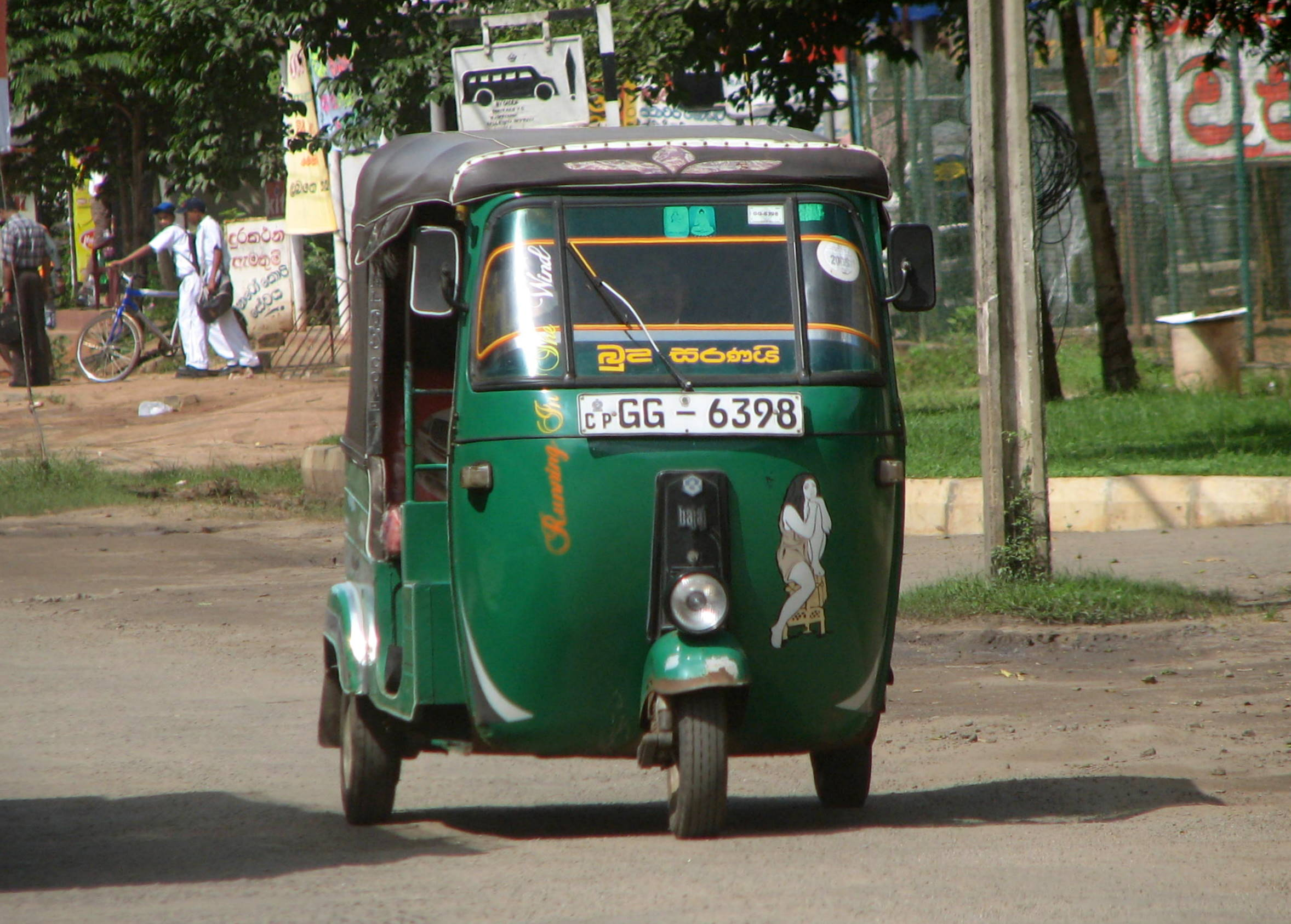
Trishaw in Polonnaruwa, Sri Lanka

Auto rickshaws, commonly known as three-wheelers, tuk-tuks (Sinhala: ටුක් ටුක්, pronounced [ṭuk ṭuk]), autos, or trishaws can be found on all roads in Sri Lanka transporting people or freight. Sri Lankan three-wheelers are of the style of the light Phnom Penh-type. Most of the three-wheelers in Sri Lanka are a slightly modified Indian Bajaj model, imported from India. Although there are a few models which are manufactured locally, imports from other countries in the region including other brands of three-wheelers, such as the Piaggio Ape, are increasing. Three-wheelers were introduced to Sri Lanka for the first time around 1979 by Richard Pieris & Company. As of mid-2018, a new gasoline powered tuk-tuk typically costs around US$4,300, while a newly introduced Chinese electric model cost around US$5,900. Since 2008, the Sri Lankan government has banned the import of all 2-stroke gasoline engines due to environmental concerns. Models imported to the island are now four-stroke engines.

Most three-wheelers are available as hired vehicles, with some being used for hauling goods, as advertising vehicles, or for private company usage. Bajaj enjoys a virtual monopoly in the island, with its agent being David Pieries Motor Co, Ltd. A few three-wheelers in Sri Lanka have distance meters, with it becoming more and more common in the capital city. However, the vast majority of fares are negotiated between the passenger and driver. There are 1.2 million trishaws in Sri Lanka and most are on financial loans. The selling of bakery items from tuk-tuks announcing their presence with mobile phone ringtones played over loudspeakers is known as choon paan in Sri Lanka.

=== Southeast Asia ===
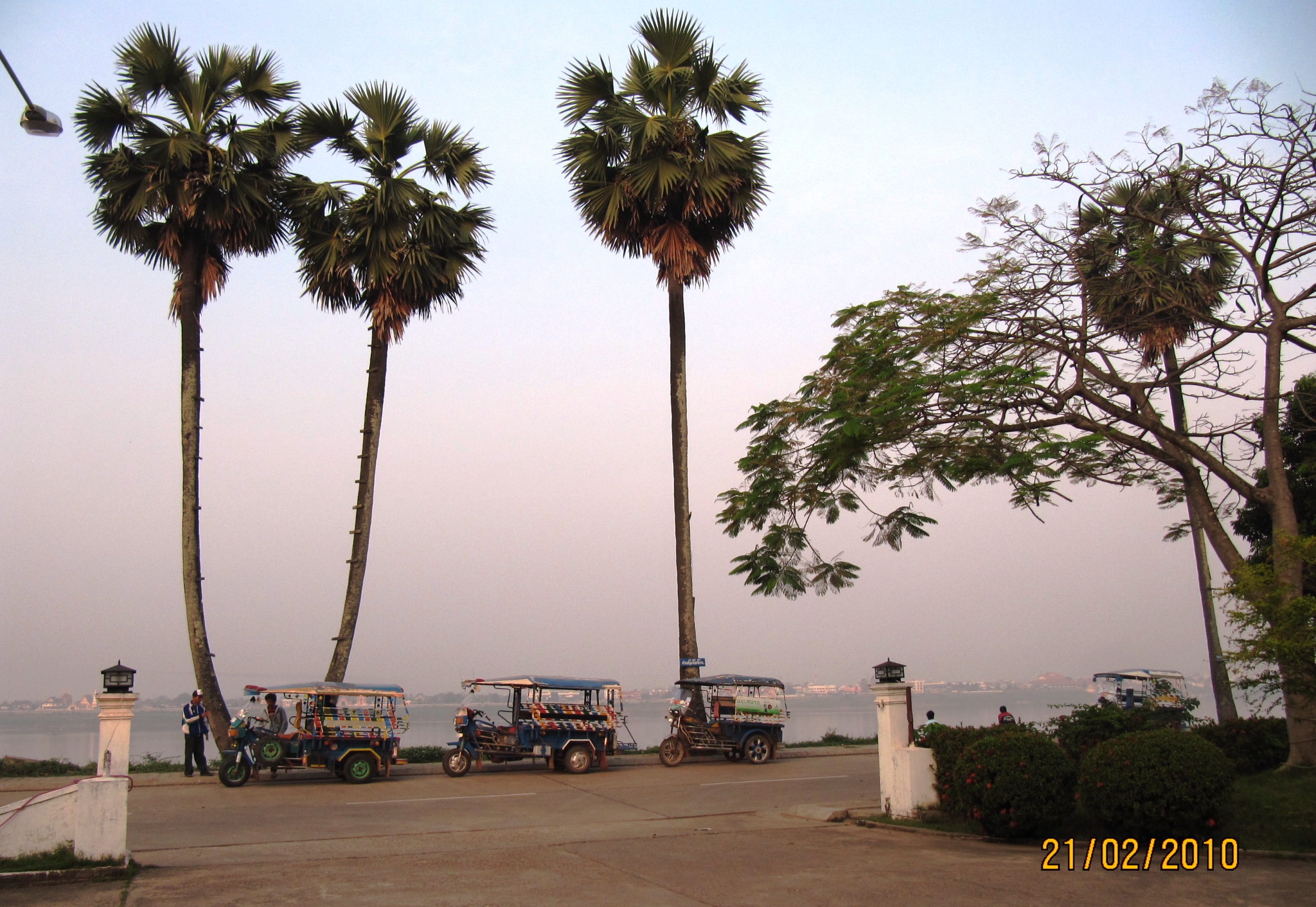
Tuktuks and palmyra palms on the Mekong bank in Thakhek, Laos

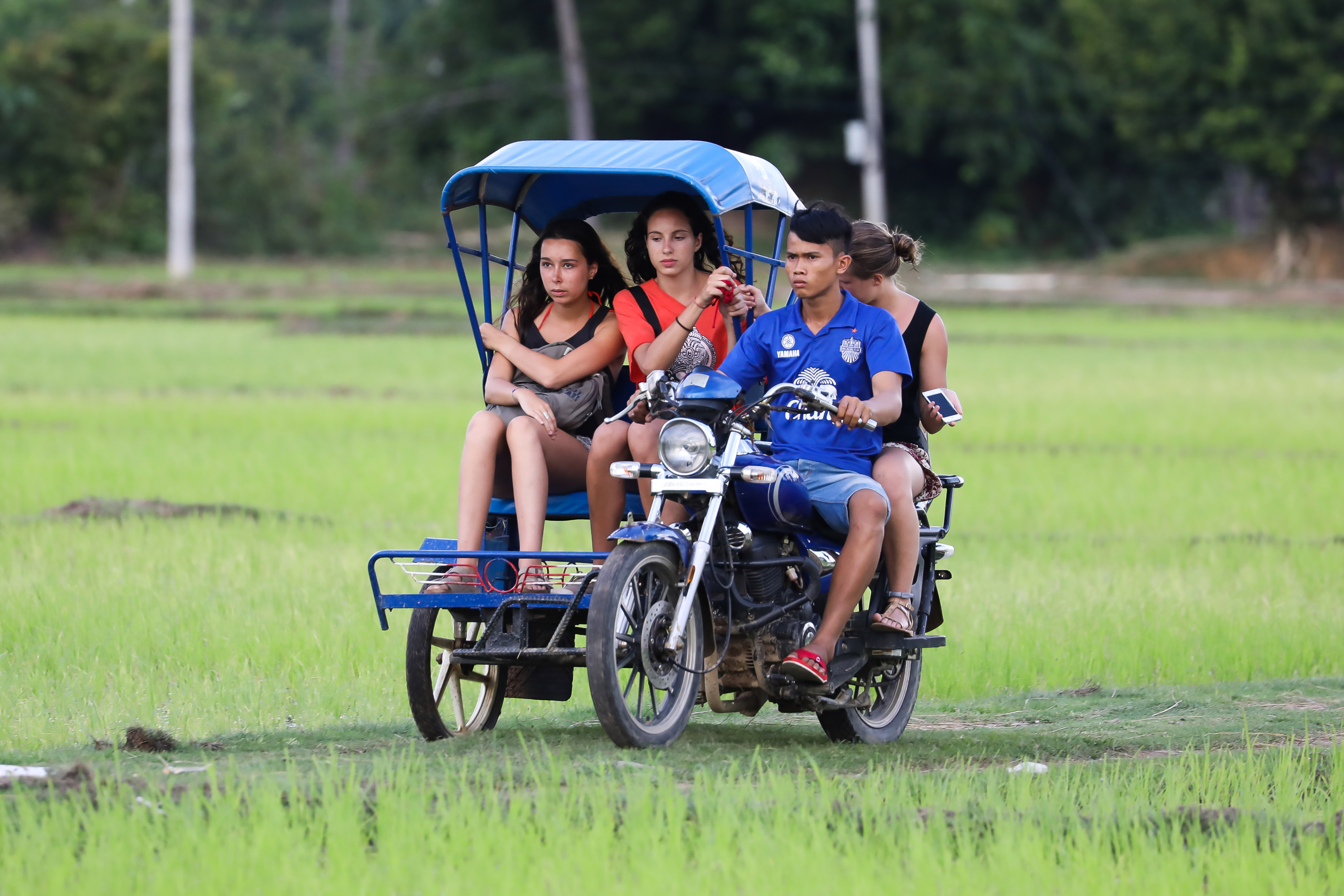
Tuk-tuk taxi sidecar in Laos

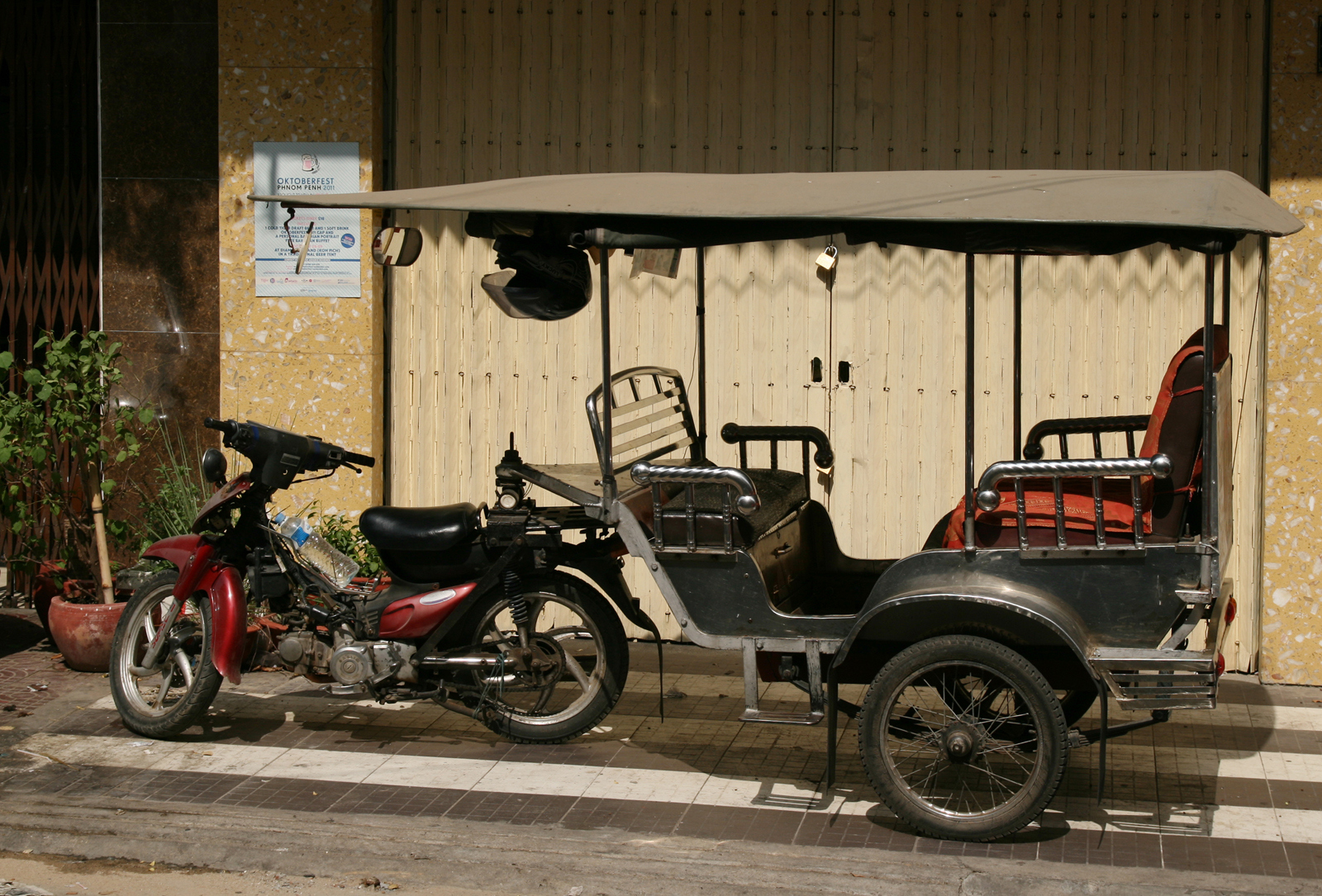
Tuk-tuk, Phnom Penh, Cambodia

==== Cambodia ====
In Cambodia, a passenger-carrying three-wheeled vehicle is known as រ៉ឺម៉ក rœmâk from the French remorque. It is a widely used form of transportation in the capital city of Phnom Penh and for visitors touring the Angkor temples in Siem Reap. Some have four wheels and are composed of a motorcycle (which leans) and trailer (which does not). Cambodian cities have a much lower volume of automobile traffic than Thai cities, and tuk-tuks are still the most common form of urban transport. There are more than 6,000 tuk-tuks in Phnom Penh, according to the Independent Democracy of Informal Economy Association (IDEA), a union that represents tuk-tuk drivers among other members.

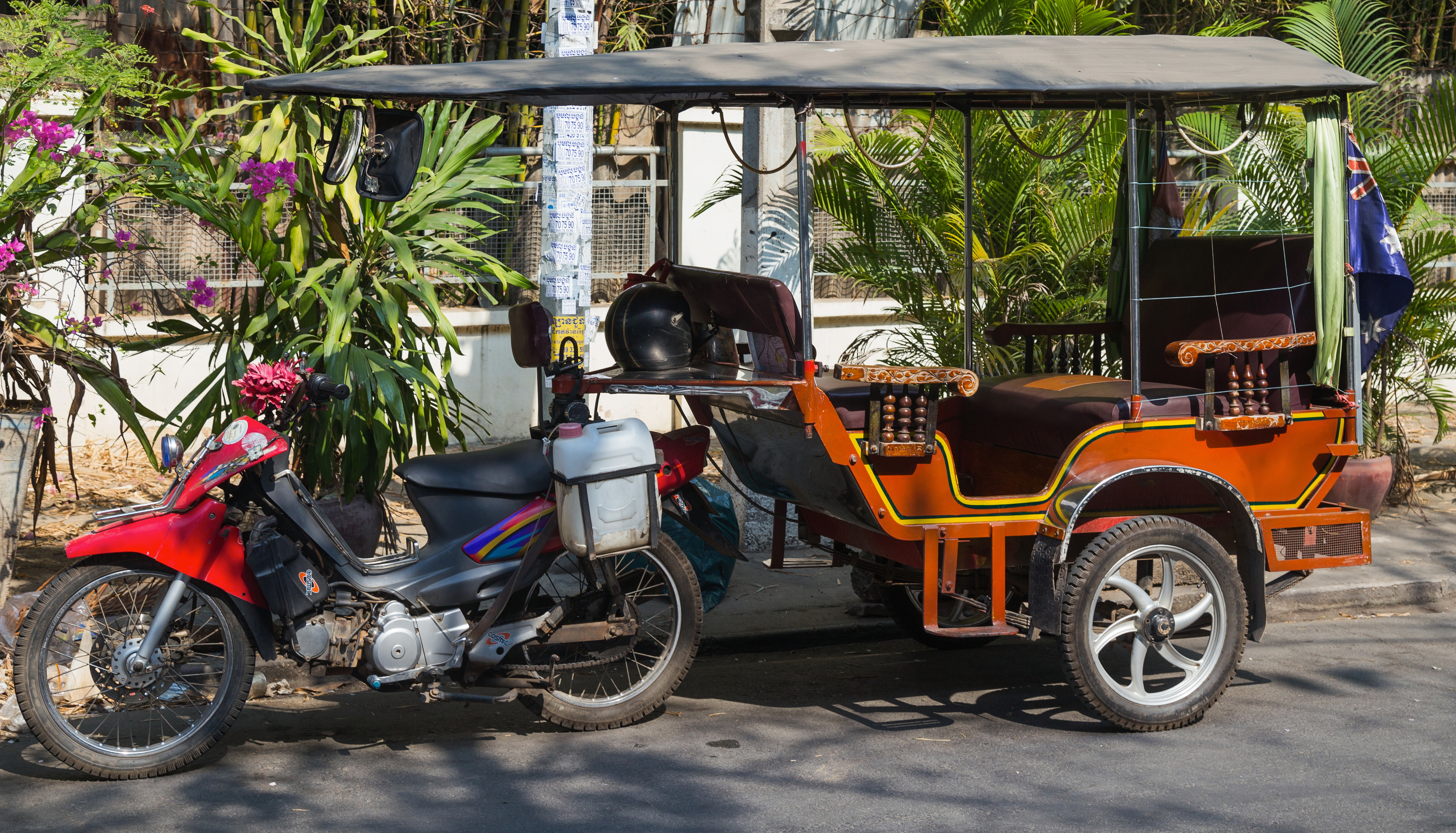

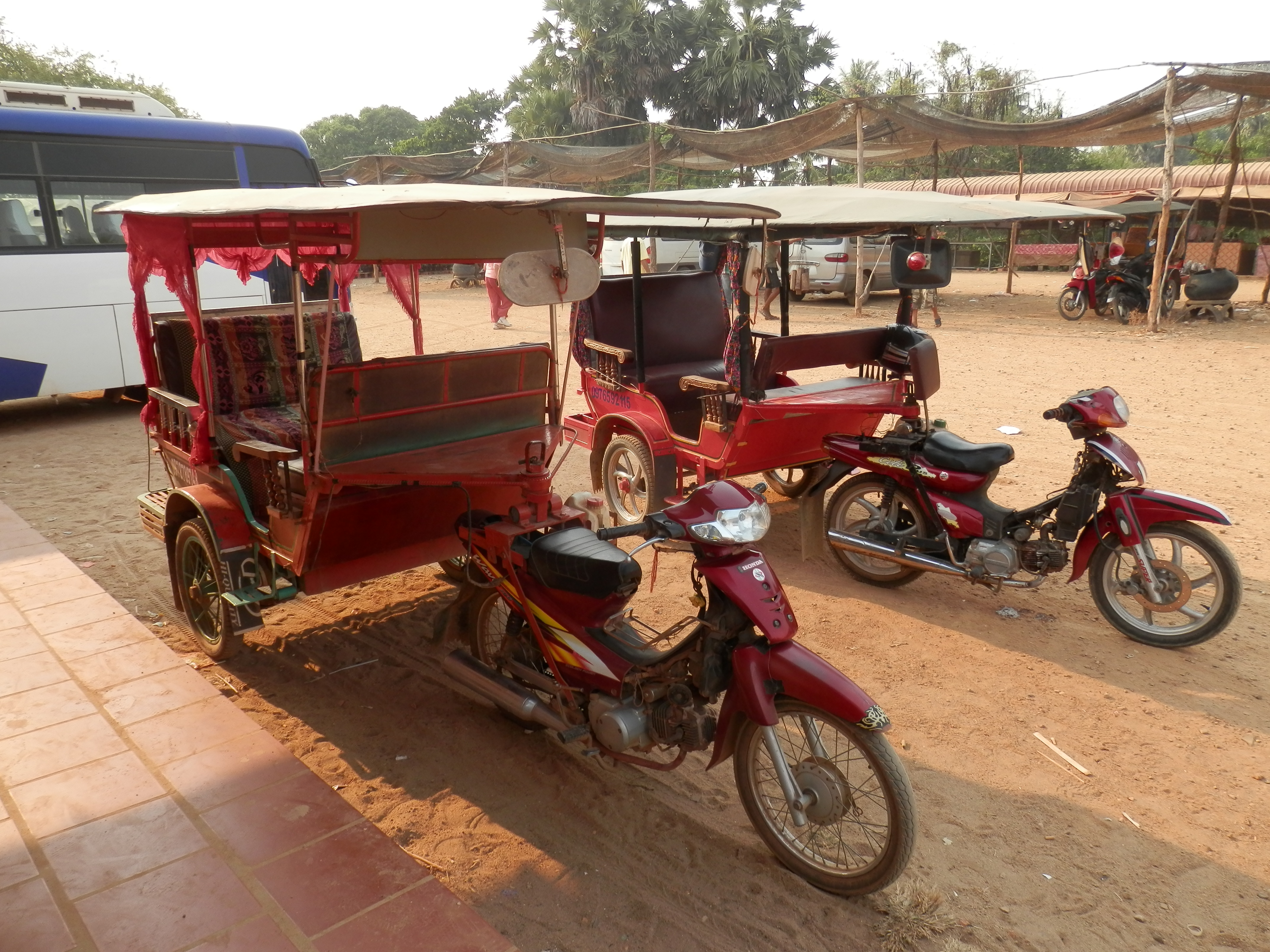

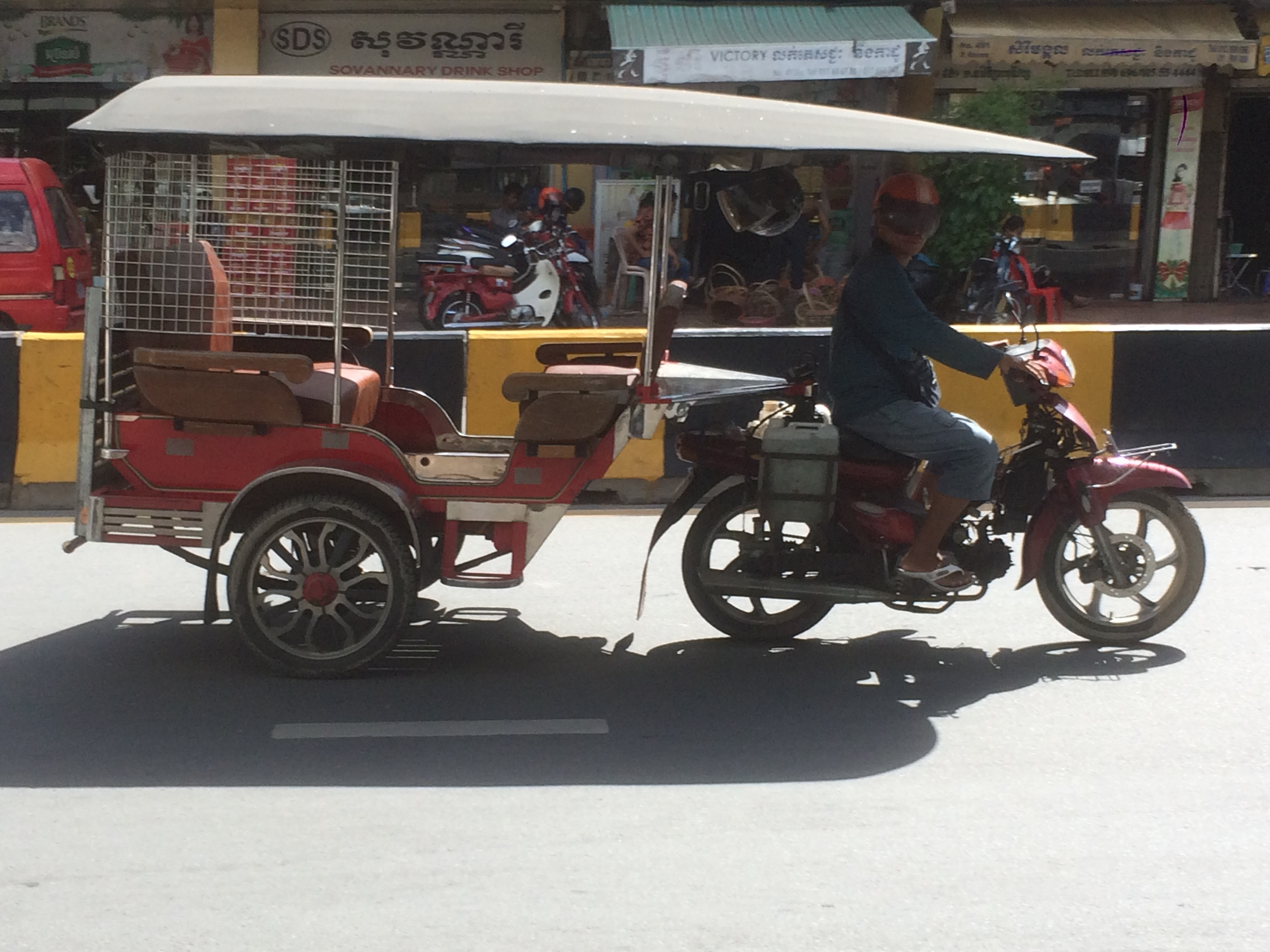

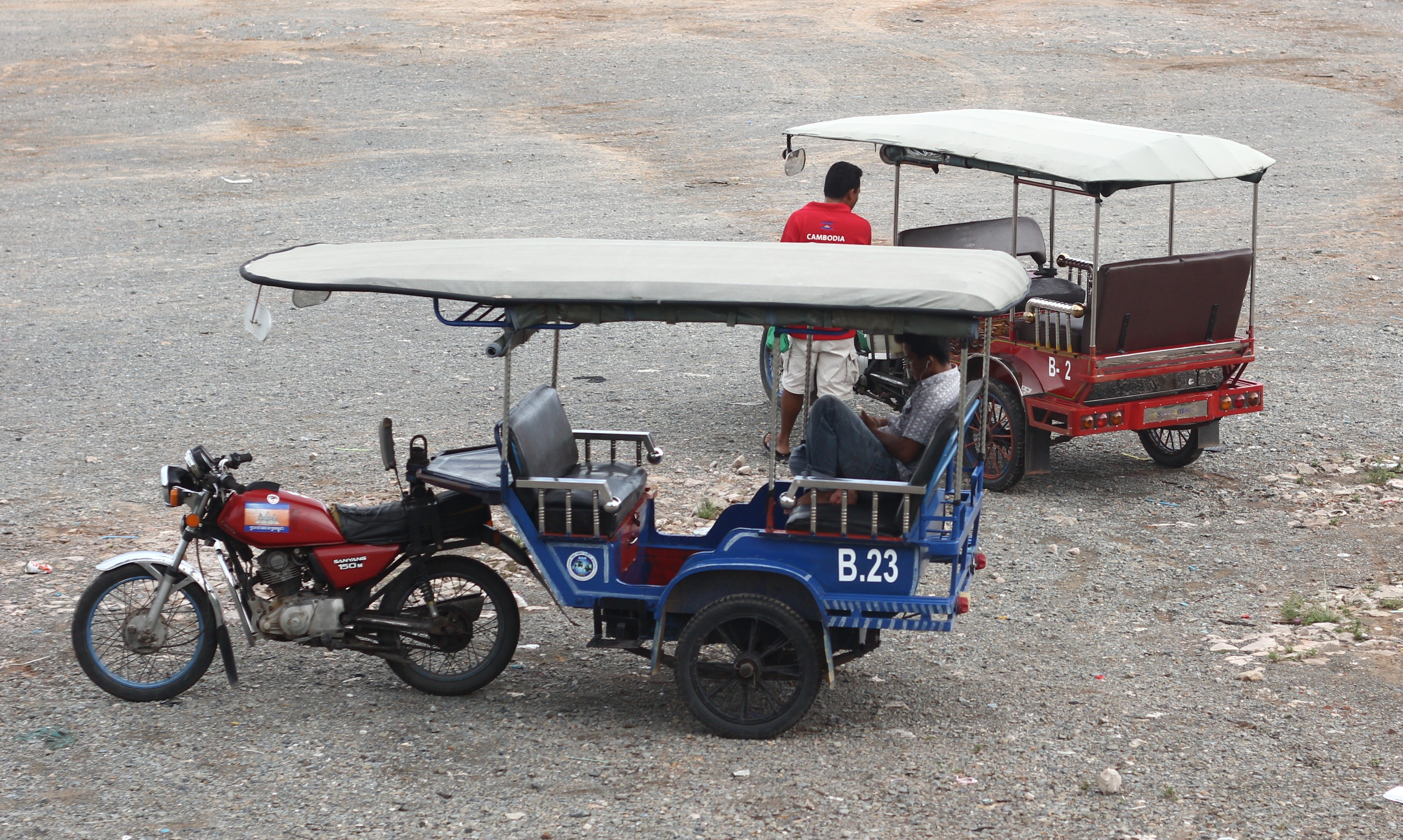

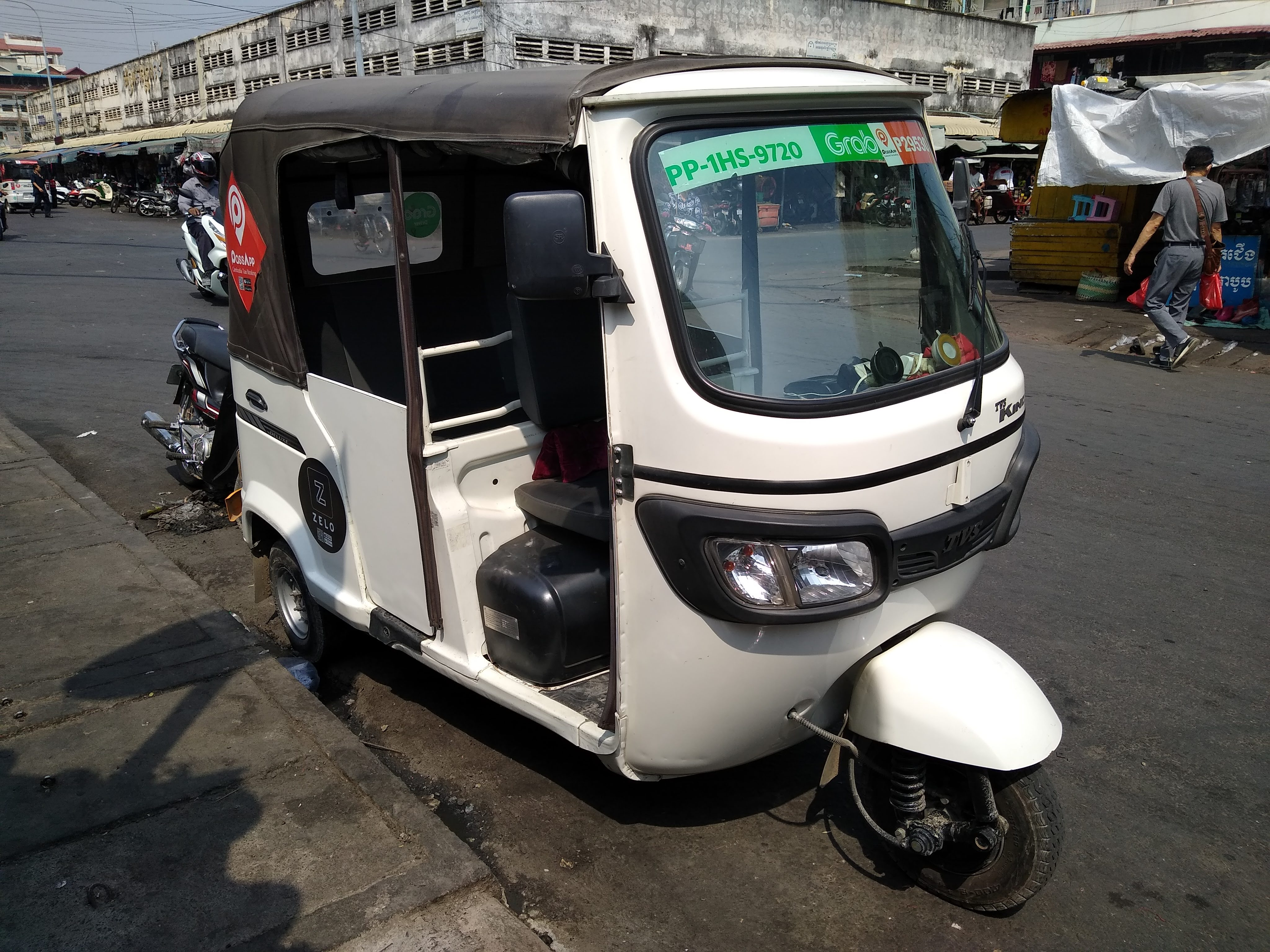

==== Indonesia ====
In Indonesia, auto rickshaws are popular in many areas such as in Jakarta, Yogyakarta, Medan, Makassar, and other places in the country. Auto rickshaws are known as Bentor in regions such as Jogja, Medan and Gorontalo while in Jakarta, they are known as Bajay. The term Bajay or Bajaj stems from their manufacturer, Bajaj Auto, which came from India.They are available in blue (for the ones which use compressed natural gas) and orange (for normal gasoline fuel). The blue ones are imported from India with the brand of Bajaj and TVS and the orange ones are the old design from 1977. The orange ones uses two-stroke engines as their prime mover, while the blue ones use four stroke engines. The orange bajaj has been banned since 2017 due to emission regulations. The Bajaj is one of the most popular modes of transportation in the city. Outside of Jakarta, the bentor-style auto rickshaw is ubiquitous, with the passenger cabin mounted as a sidecar (like in Medan) or in-front (like the ones in some parts of Sulawesi) to a motorcycle.

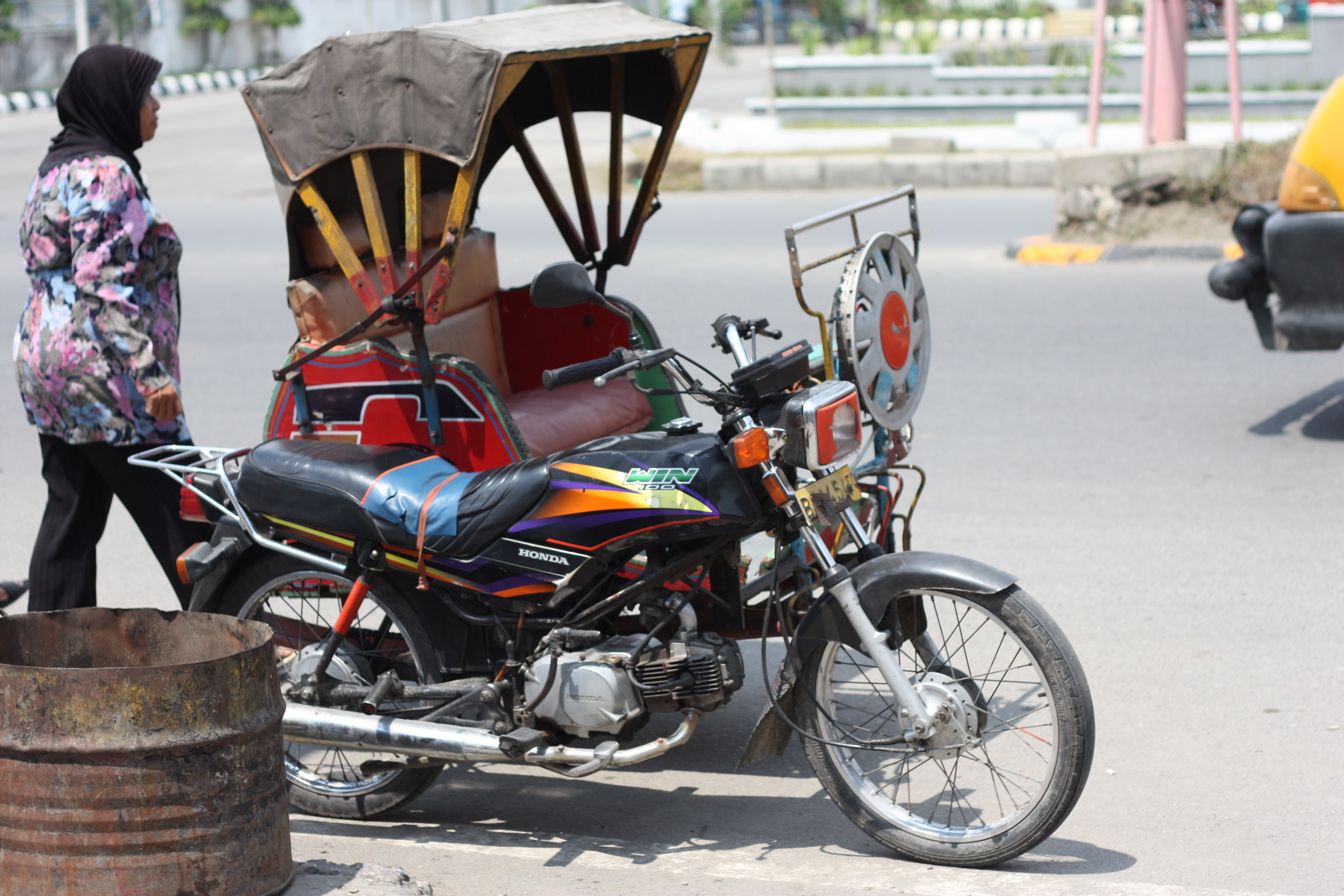
Bentor in Medan

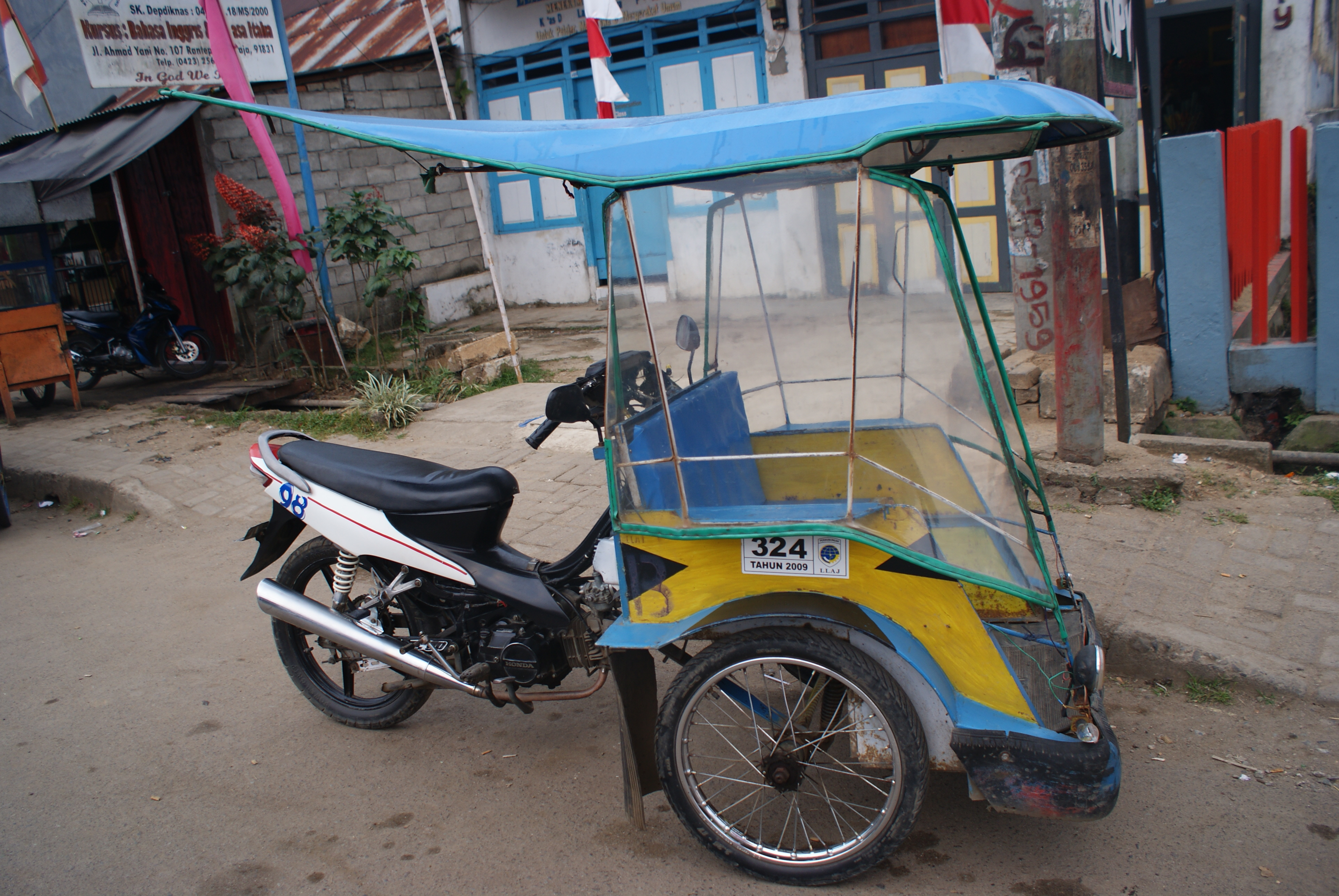
Bentor in Makassar

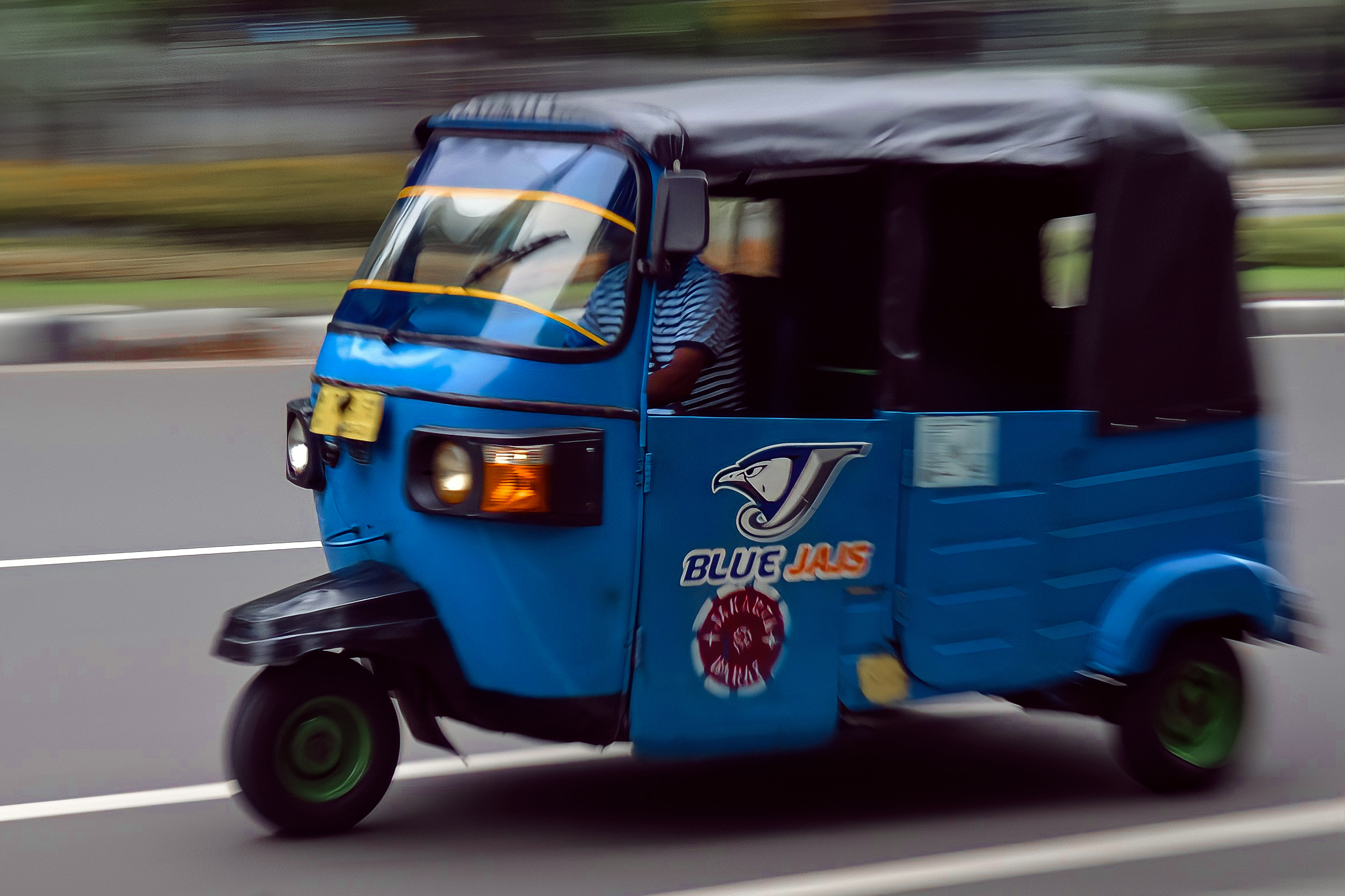
4-stroke Bajaj in Jakarta

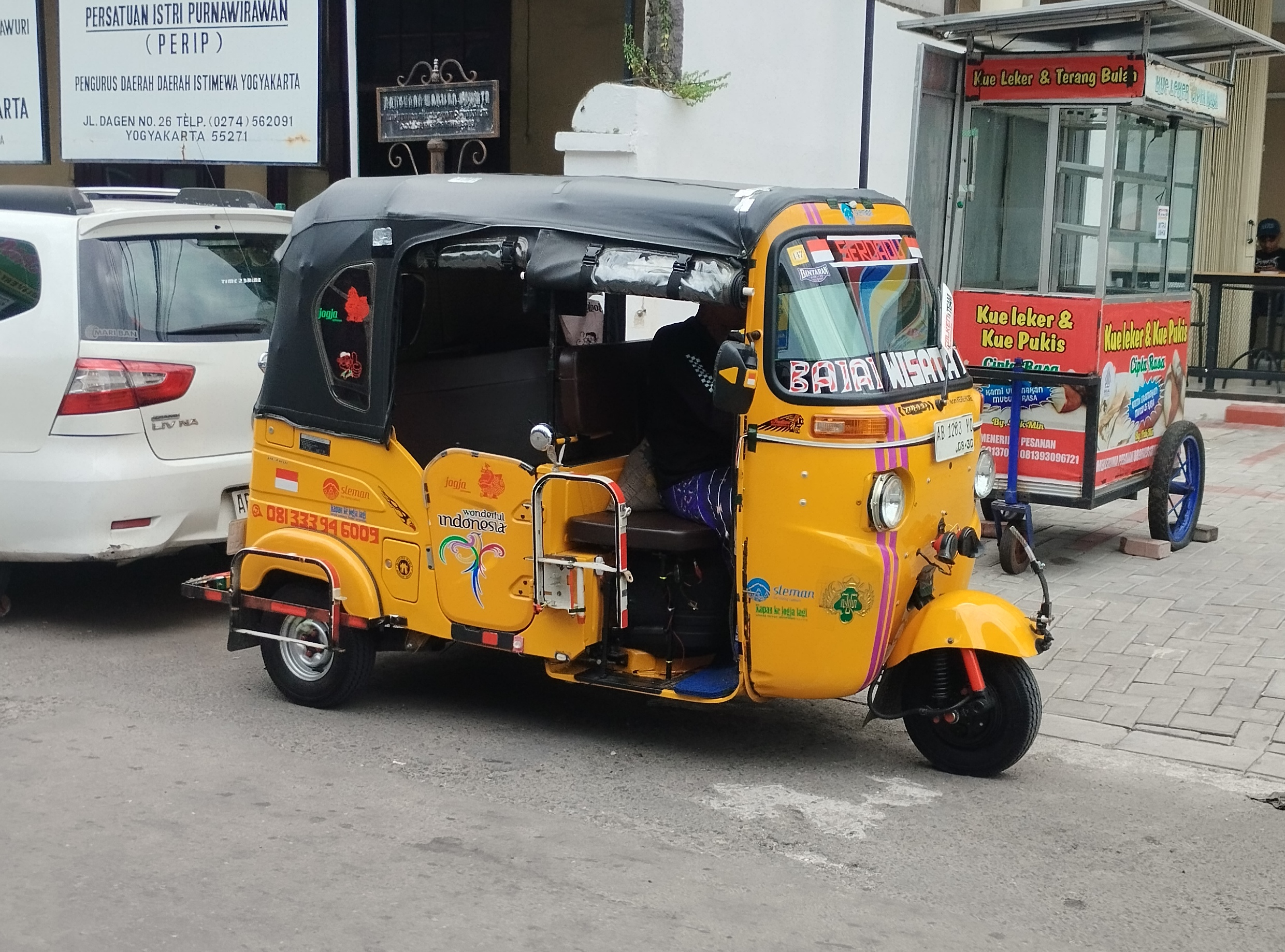
4-stroke Bajaj in Yogyakarta

==== Philippines ====
In the Philippines, a similar mode of public transport is the tricycle (Filipino: traysikel; Cebuano: traysikol). Unlike auto rickshaws, Philippine tricycles use a motorcycle with a sidecar configuration. The exact date of their appearance in the Philippines is unknown, but they began appearing after World War II, roughly at the same time as the jeepney. One hypothesis is that they were derived from the Rikuo Type 97 military motorcycle used by the Imperial Japanese Army in the Philippines during World War II. The motorcycle was essentially a licensed copy of a Harley-Davidson with a sidecar. Another hypothesis places their origin in the similarly configured pedicab, a human-powered cycle rickshaw, although the provenance of the trisikad is also unknown.

The design and configuration of tricycles vary widely between localities, although there is a tendency toward standardization within individual municipalities. The usual design consists of a passenger or cargo sidecar attached to a motorcycle, typically on the right side. Left-side sidecars are uncommon.

Tricycles can carry passengers in the sidecar and on the motorcycle, as well as cargo. The number of passengers varies according to the design and local regulations. Some tricycles also have roof racks for carrying goods. Tricycles are a significant source of air pollution in the Philippines, and two-stroke engines have been identified as a source of volatile organic compound emissions. Some local governments have implemented programs to replace two-stroke tricycles with cleaner four-stroke models.

Three-wheeled vehicles distinct from conventional motorized tricycles, known elsewhere as tuk-tuks, are also operated in the Philippines. In parts of Batangas and Cavite, such vehicles are known as bukyo. Electric versions, commonly known as e-trikes, have also been introduced in several cities. In Philippine usage, electric three-wheeled vehicles are also commonly referred to as e-bikes. In January 2026, the LTO announced a ban on e-trikes on major roads in Metro Manila, effective January 2.

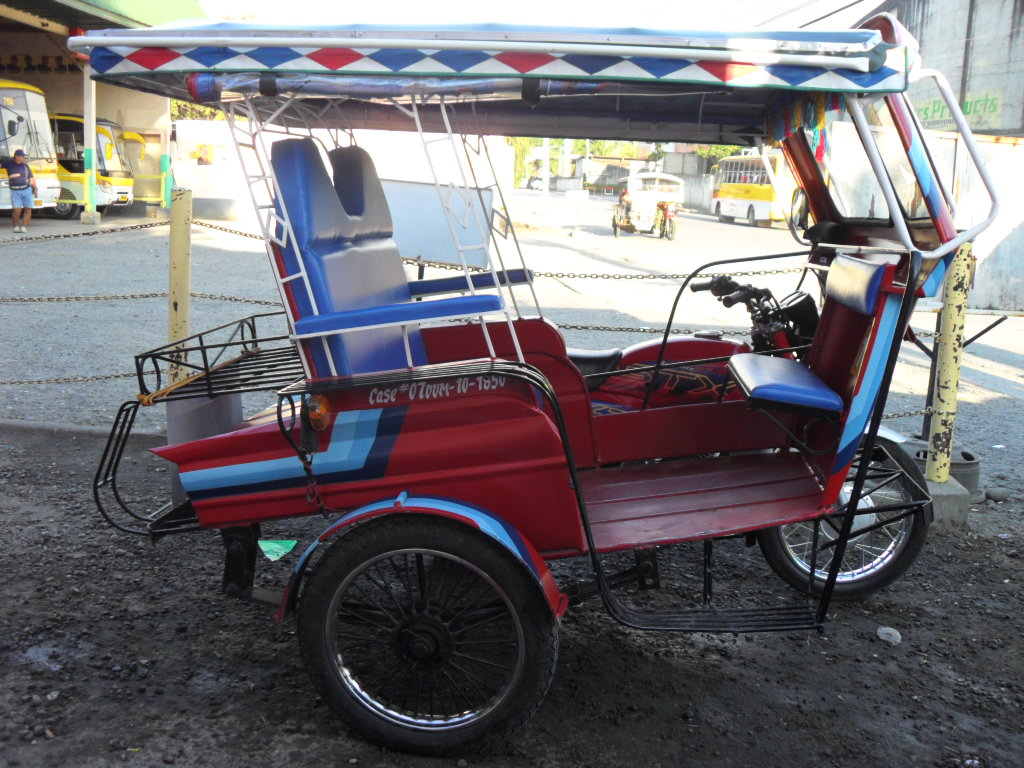
A motorized tricycle in Dumaguete

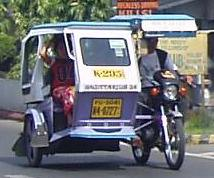
A 7-passenger tricycle with large sidecar in Kalibo, Aklan

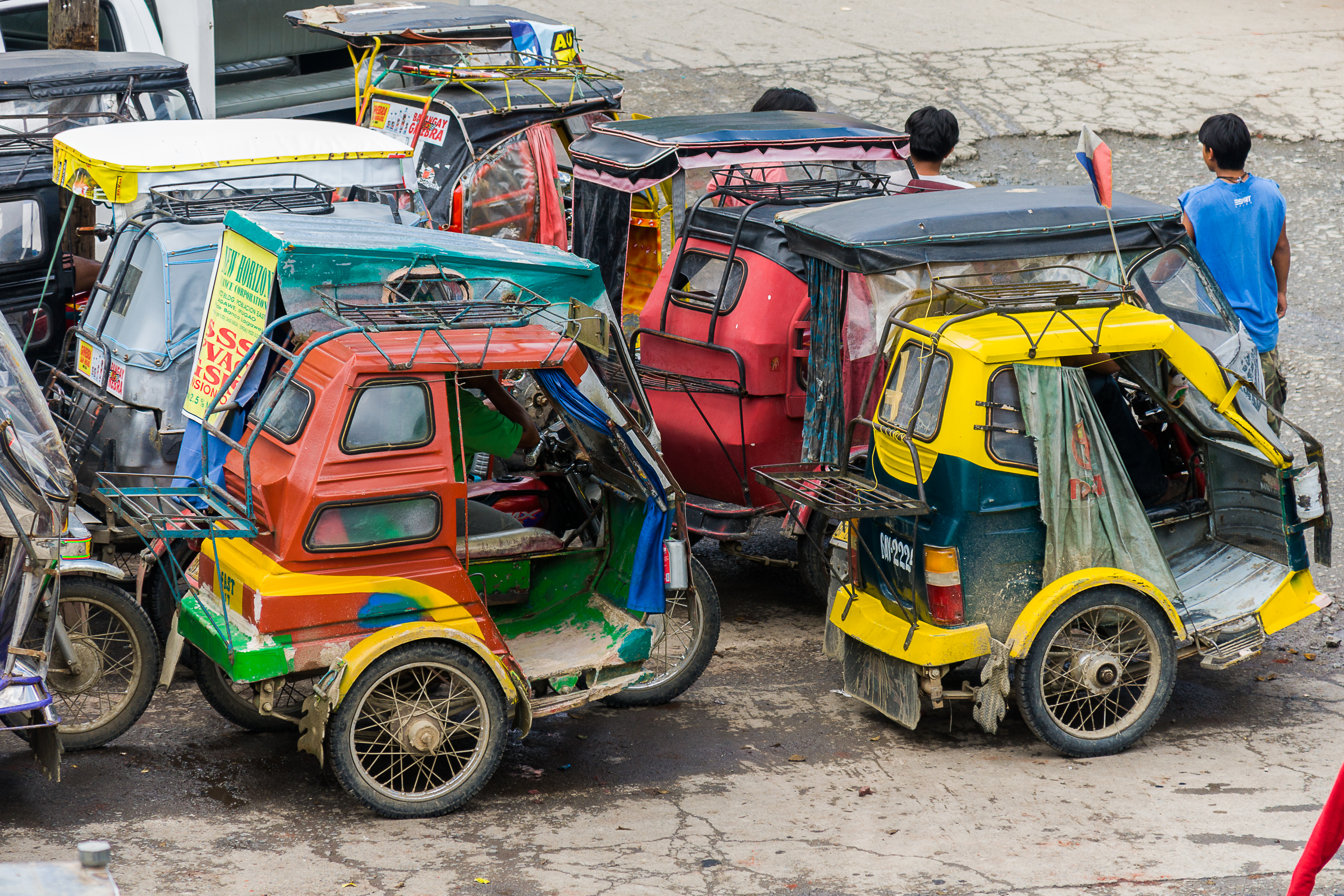
A tricycle stand in Banaue, Ifugao

==== Thailand ====
The auto rickshaw, called tuk tuk (Thai: ตุ๊ก ๆ, pronounced [túk túk]) in Thailand, is a widely used form of urban transport in Bangkok and other Thai cities. The name is onomatopoeic, mimicking the sound of a small (often two-cycle) engine. It is particularly popular where traffic congestion is a major problem, such as in Bangkok and Nakhon Ratchasima. In Bangkok in the 1960s, these were called samlo (สามล้อ, lit. 'three-wheeler'), and they are still popularly called that today.

Bangkok and other cities in Thailand have many tuk-tuks which are a more open variation on the Indian auto rickshaw. About 20,000 tuk-tuks were registered as taxis in Thailand in 2017. Bangkok alone is reported to have 9,000 tuk-tuks.

Tuk tuk hua kob (ตุ๊ก ๆ หัวกบ, pronounced [túk túk hua̯ kop̚], lit. 'frog-headed tuk tuk') is a unique tuk tuk with a cab looking like a frog's head. Only Phra Nakhon Si Ayutthaya and Trang have vehicles like this.

in 2018, MuvMi, an electric tuk-tuk ride hailing service launched in Bangkok.

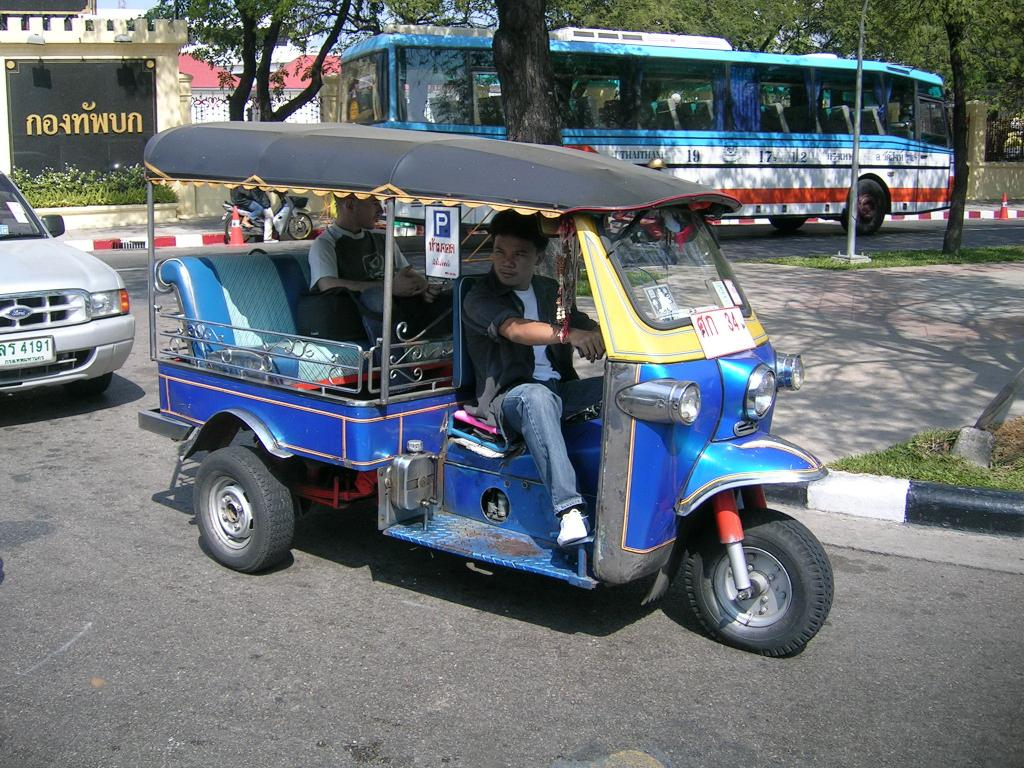
Tuk-tuk in Bangkok

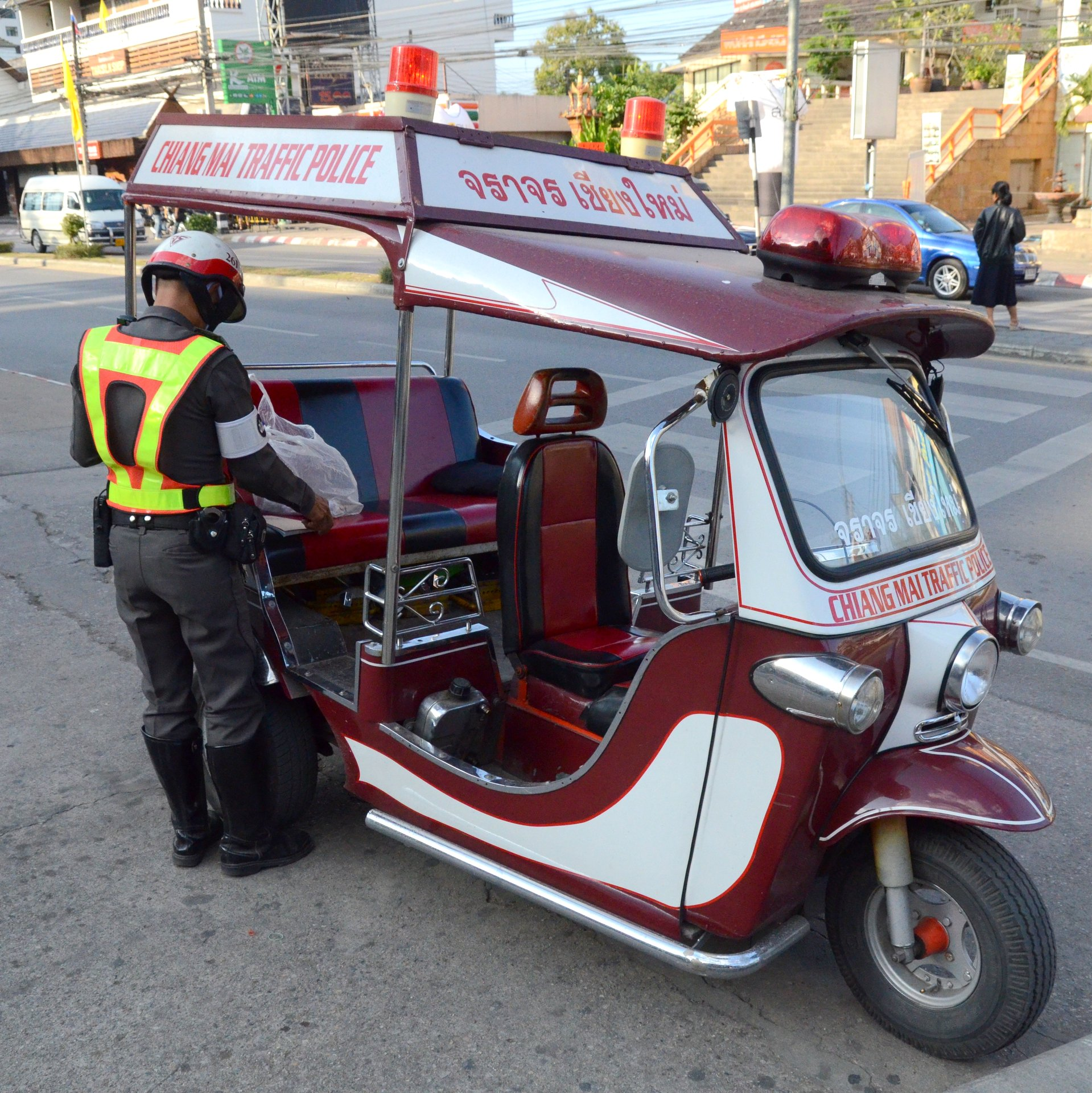
Police tuk-tuk, Chiang Mai

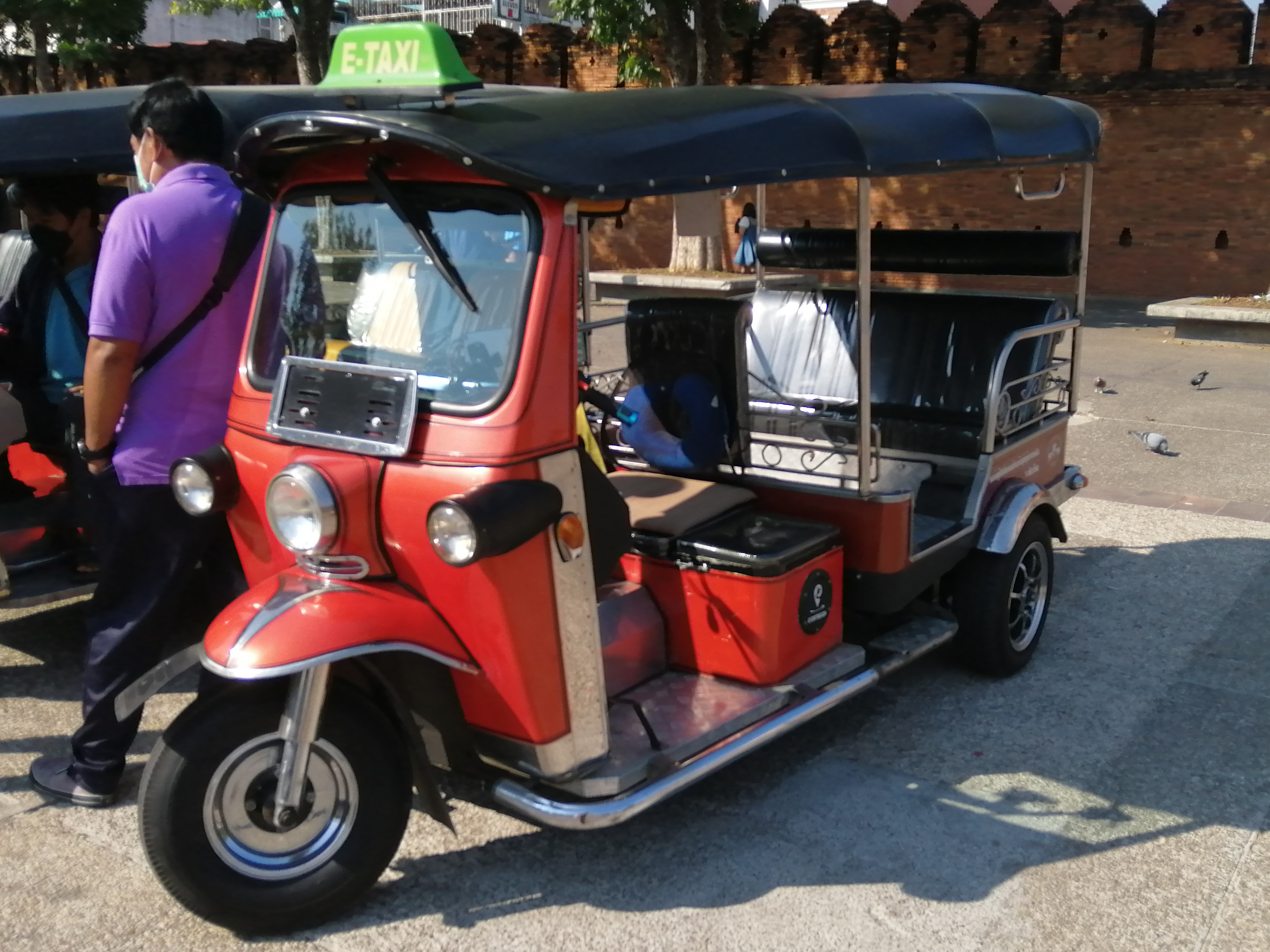
Electric tuk-tuk in Chiang Mai

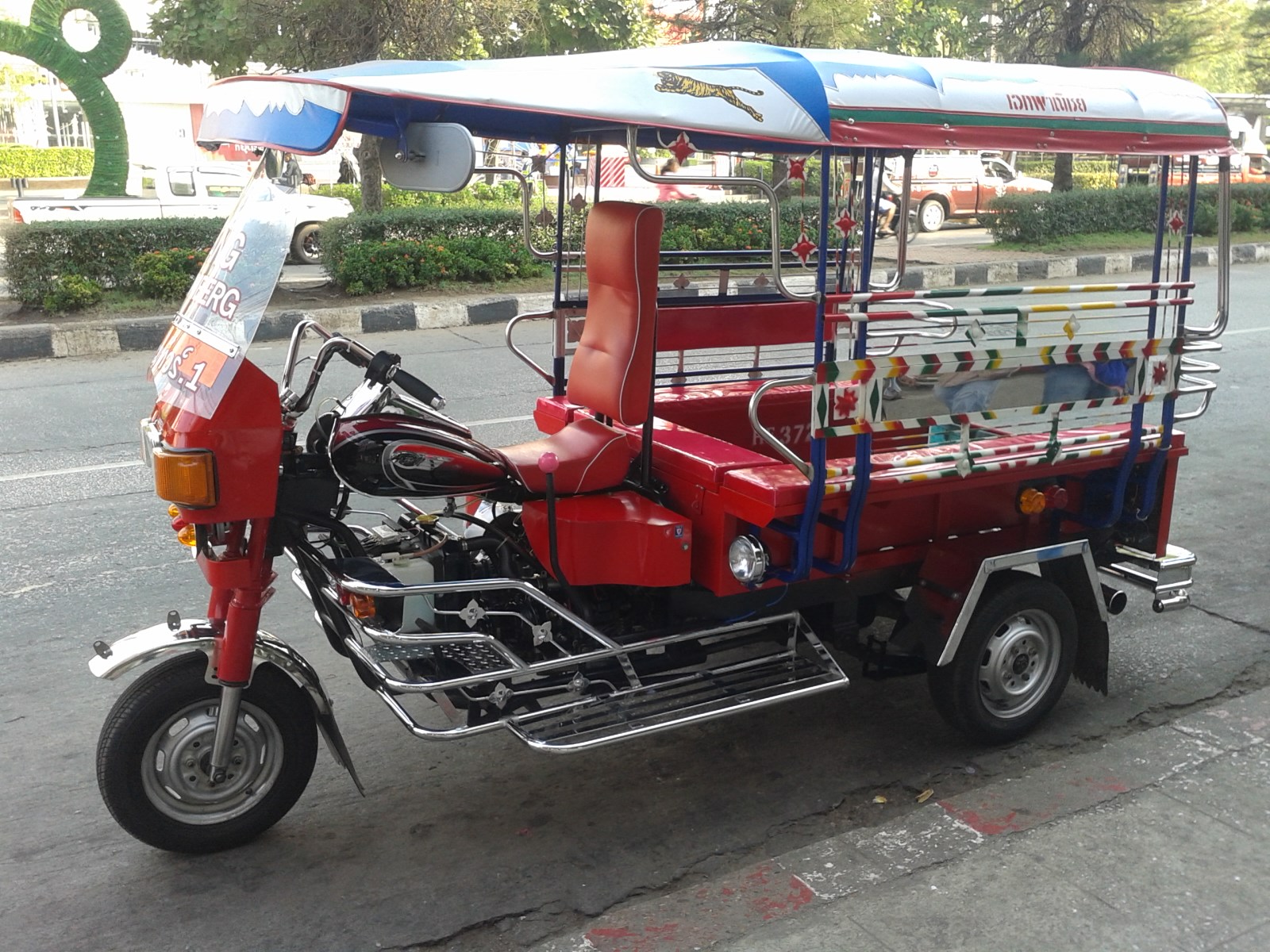
Thai northeast (Isan)-style half tuk-tuk/half songthaew, Udon Thani (it known as "skylab")

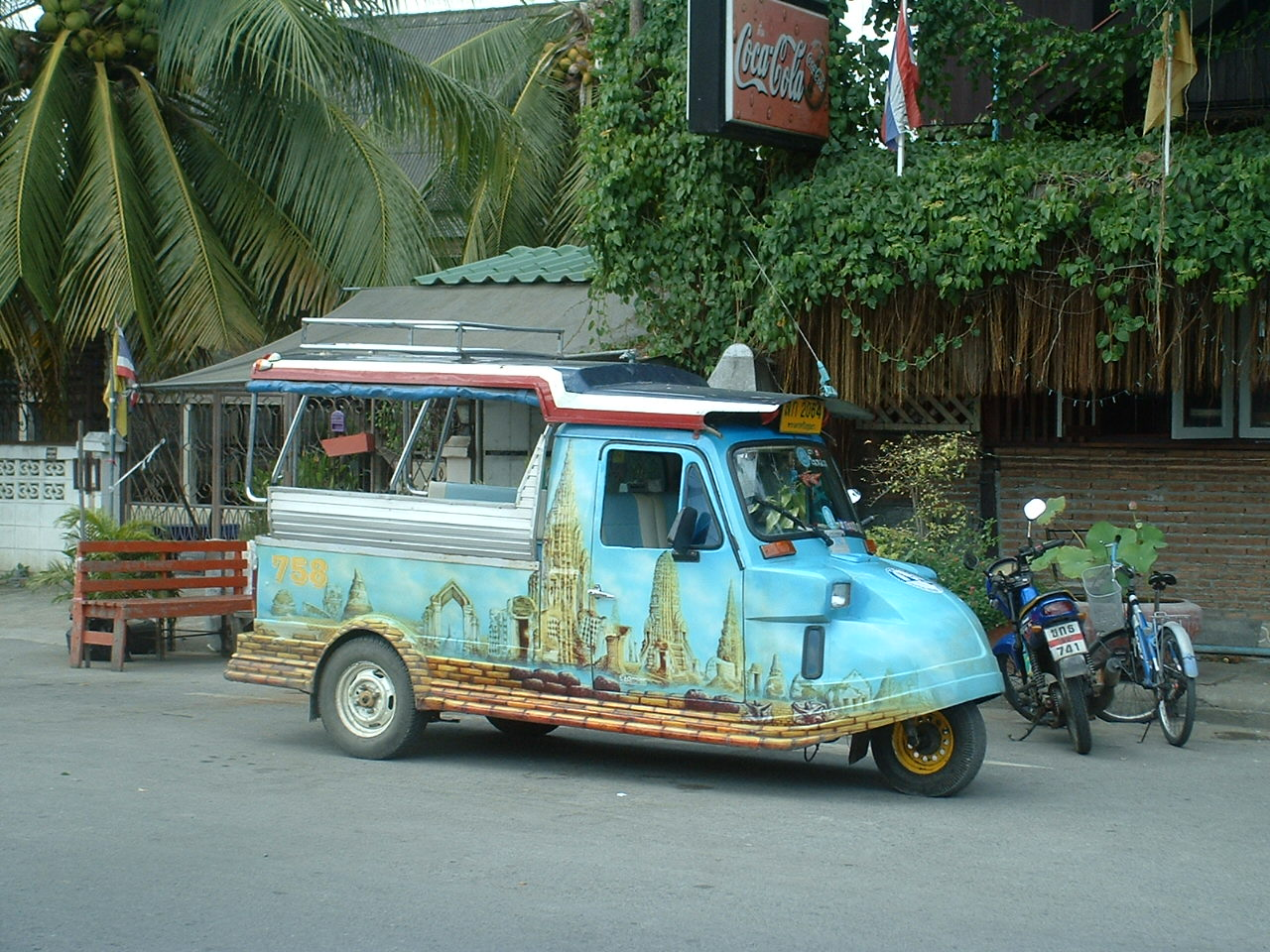
Tuk-tuk hua kob, Phra Nakhon Si Ayutthaya

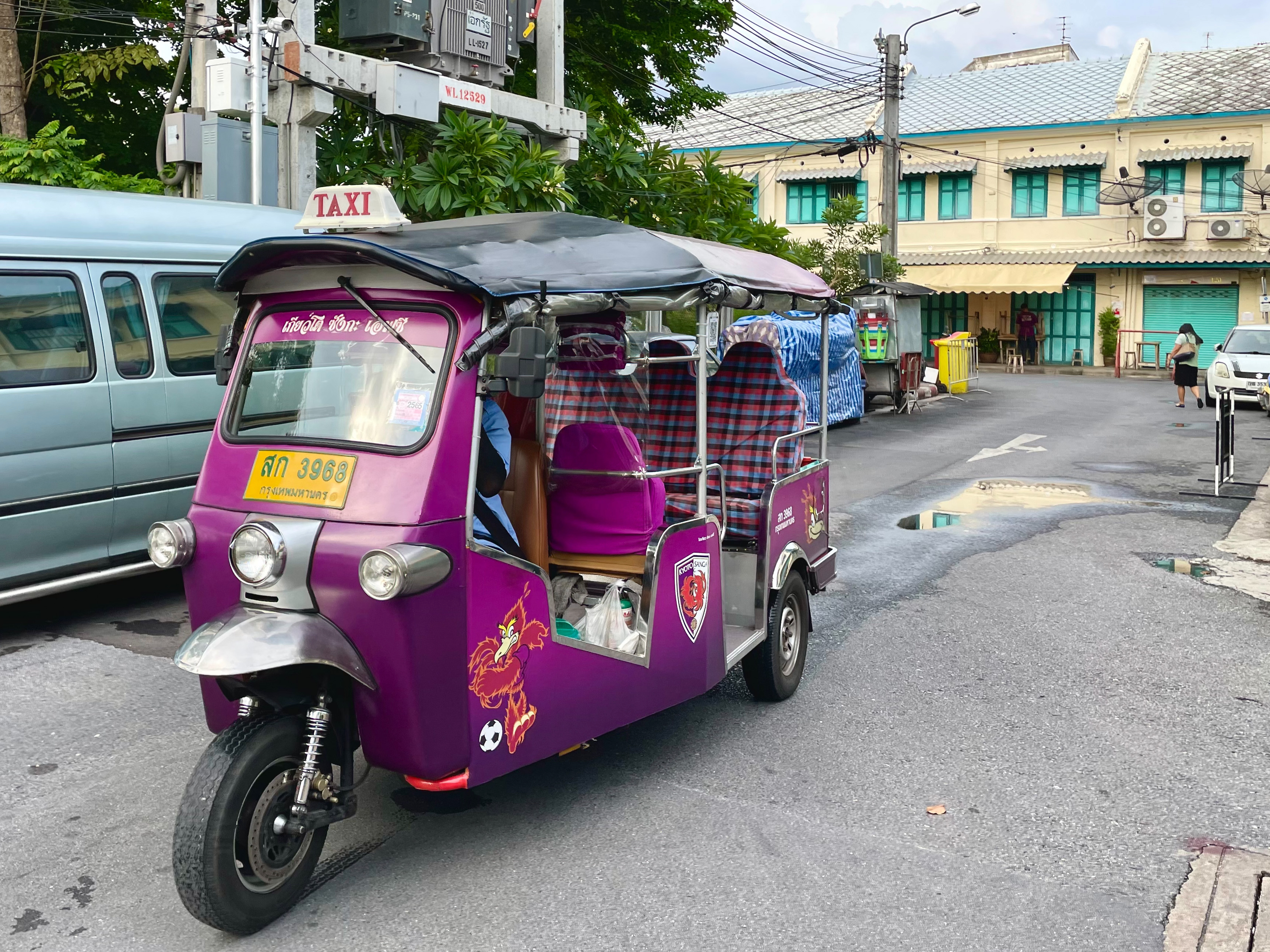
Electric MuvMi tuk-tuk in Bangkok

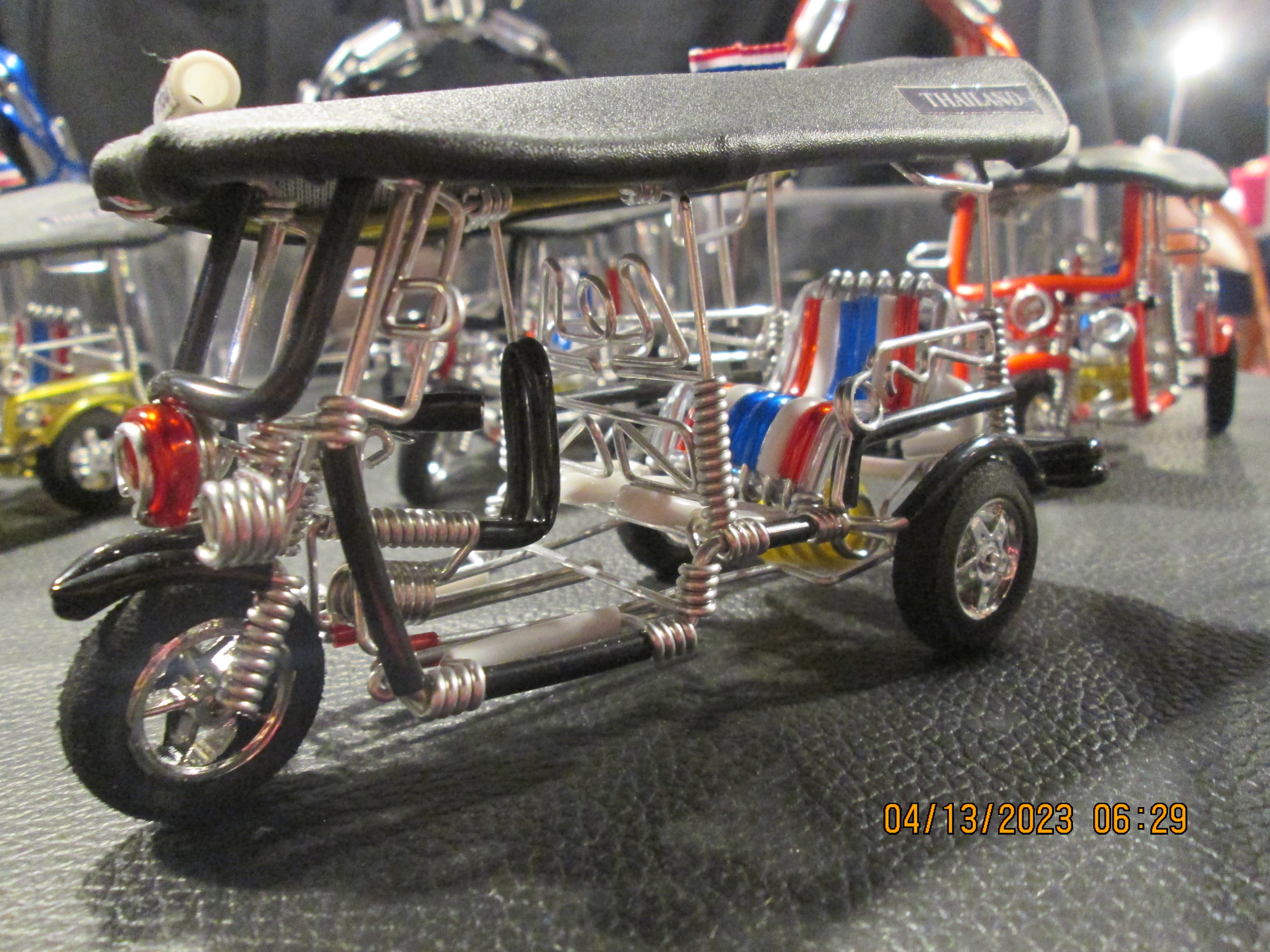
Model Tuk-tuk at Hua Hin

=== East Asia ===
==== China ====
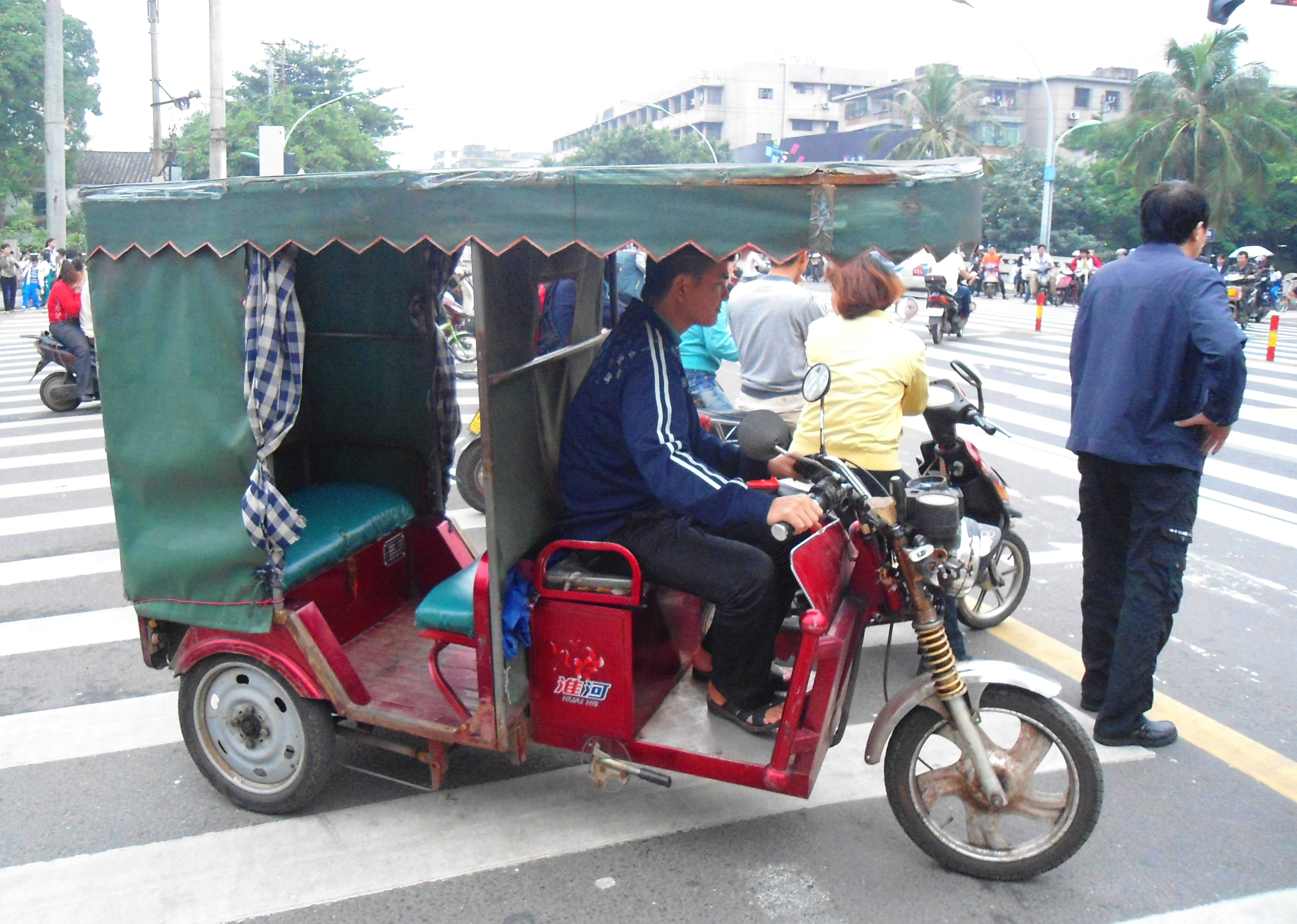
A Jiangsu Huai He (江苏淮海电动车制造有限公司) auto rickshaw in Haikou

A Boji BJ-SJ180 King Kong in Shenzhen with a parasol attached to its handlebar

Various types of auto rickshaw are used around China, where they are called sān lún chē (三轮车) and sometimes sān bèng zǐ (三蹦子), meaning three wheeler or tricycle. They may be used to transport cargo or passengers in the more rural areas. However, in many urban areas the auto rickshaws for passengers are often operated illegally as they are considered unsafe and an eyesore. They are permitted in some towns and cities, however. The Southeast Asian word tuk tuk is transliterated as dū dū chē (嘟嘟车, or beep beep car) in Chinese.

A Boji BJ-SW150-B Underbone in Shenzhen

A TAILG motorized tricycle in Shenzhen with a top cover

A Silver Bullet motorized tricycle in Shenzhen

Underside of a motorized tricycle in Xi'an

=== Europe ===
==== France ====
A number of tuk-tuks (250 in 2013 according to the Paris Prefecture) are used as an alternative tourist transport system in Paris, some of them being pedal-operated with electric motor assist. They are not yet fully licensed to operate and await customers on the streets. Vélotaxis were common during the Occupation years in Paris due to fuel restrictions.

==== Italy ====
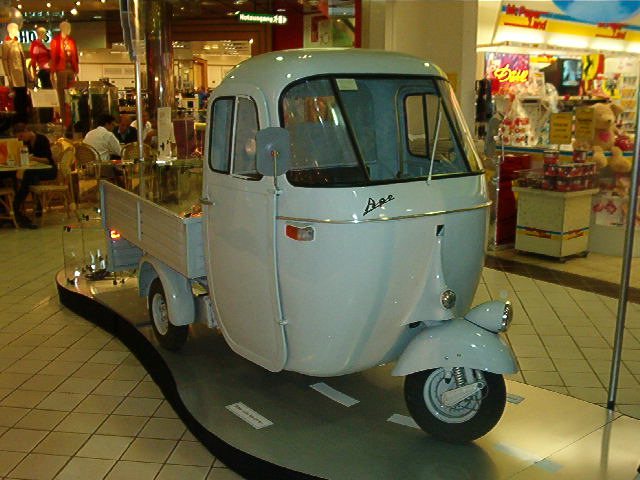
An Ape C (1956–1967)

Auto rickshaws have been commonly used in Italy since the late 1940s, providing a low-cost means of transportation in the post–World War II years when the country was short of economic resources. The Piaggio Ape (Tukxi), designed by Vespa creator Corradino D'Ascanio and first manufactured in 1947 by the Italian company Piaggio, though primarily designed for carrying freight has also been widely used as an auto rickshaw. It is still extremely popular throughout the country, being particularly useful in the narrow streets found in the center of many little towns in central and southern Italy. Though it no longer has a key role in transportation, Piaggio Ape is still used as a minitaxi in some areas such as the islands of Ischia and Stromboli (on Stromboli no cars are allowed). It has recently been re-launched as a trendy-ecological means of transportation, or, relying on the role the Ape played in the history of Italian design, as a promotional tool.

==== Portugal ====
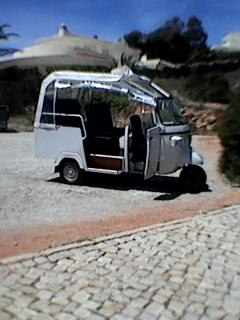
Tuk Tuk Taxi in Albufeira Portugal

Tuk Tuks are used in the main touristic cities and regions of the country, specially in Lisbon and the sunny region of Algarve, as a novel form of transport for visitors during the tourist season.

==== Spain ====
Tuk Tuks have become a popular mode of transport in Spain’s main tourist destinations, particularly in Barcelona and the coastal areas of Valencia, as well as Mallorca and Málaga

==== United Kingdom ====
In 2006 a British travel writer – Antonia Bolingbroke-Kent – and her friend Jo Huxster travelled 12,561 miles (20,215 km) with an auto rickshaw from Bangkok to Brighton. With this 98 days' trip they set a Guinness World Record for the longest journey ever with an auto rickshaw. In October 2022, Gwent police spent £40,000 on four tuk tuk vehicles in order to help fight crime.

==== Montenegro ====
Tuk Tuk Montenegro has implemented tours with electric tuk-tuks in Kotor, Montenegro in 2018.

=== Central and North America ===
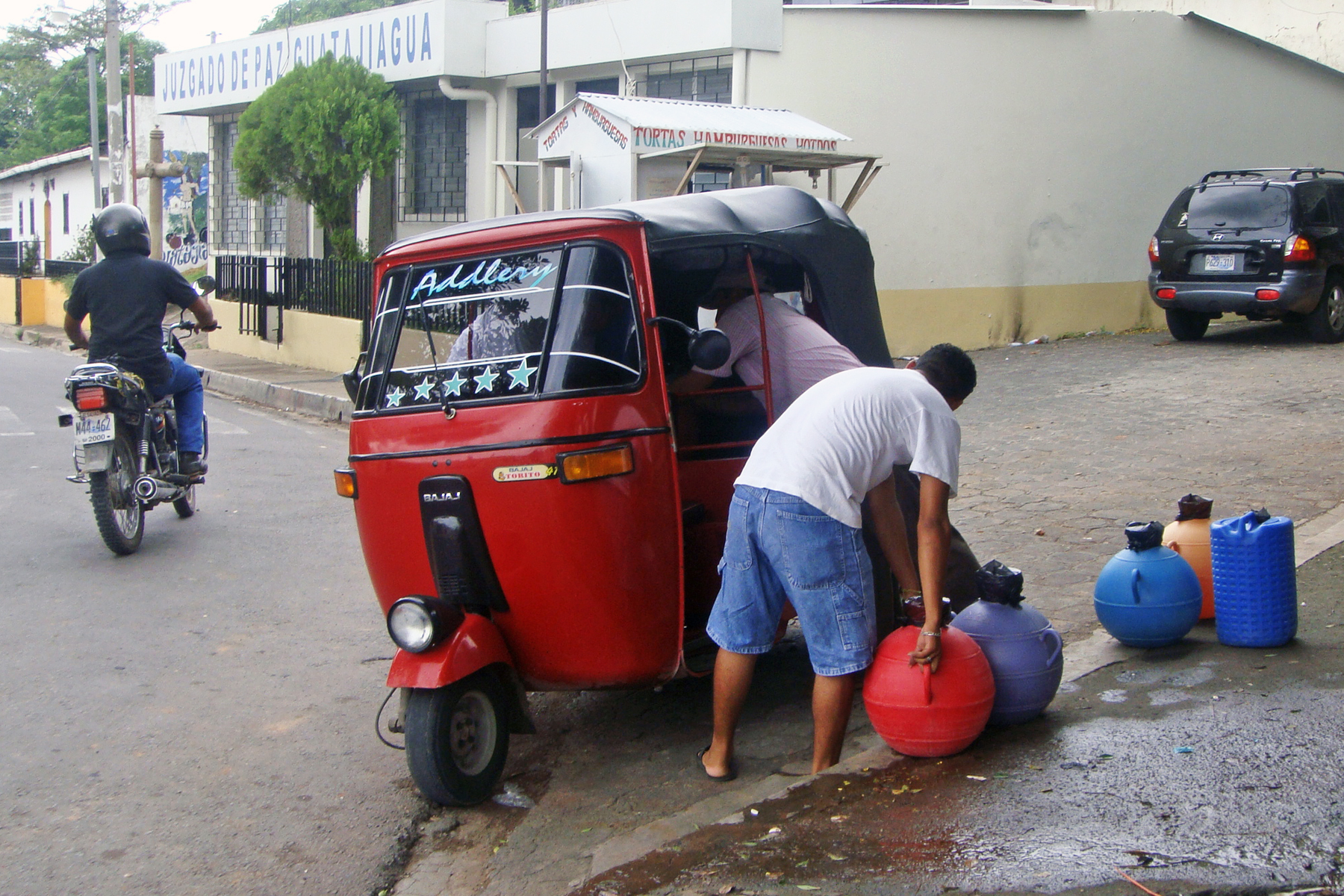
Bajaj mototaxis in El Salvador

==== El Salvador ====
The mototaxi or moto is the El Salvadoran version of the auto rickshaw. These are most commonly made from the front end and engine of a motorcycle attached to a two-wheeled passenger area in back. Commercially produced models, such as the Indian Bajaj brand, are also employed.

==== Guatemala ====
In Guatemala tuk-tuks operate, both as taxis and private vehicles, in Guatemala City, around the island town of Flores, Peten, in the mountain city of Antigua Guatemala, and in many small towns in the mountains. From 2005 to present the tuk-tuks have been prevalent in Lago de Atitlán towns such as Panajachel and Santiago Atitlán. While tuk-tuks continue to serve as a prevalent form of transportation in Antigua and Lake Atitlan their use throughout the country as a whole has declined.

==== United States ====
In the 1950s and 1960s, the United States Post Office (replaced in 1971 by the United States Postal Service) used the WestCoaster Mailster, a close relative of the tuk-tuk. Similar vehicles remain in limited use for parking enforcement, mall security, and other niche applications. After a short time on the market (Mid-2000s to 2008) in the United States, the vehicles failed to gain popularity in the United States, and as a result, are no longer available. The Manufacturer Bajaj cited the manual transmissions aboard the three-wheelers as the reason for poor sales. As a result of modifications that made the machines EPA and DOT compliant, the vehicles that were sold are still street-legal.

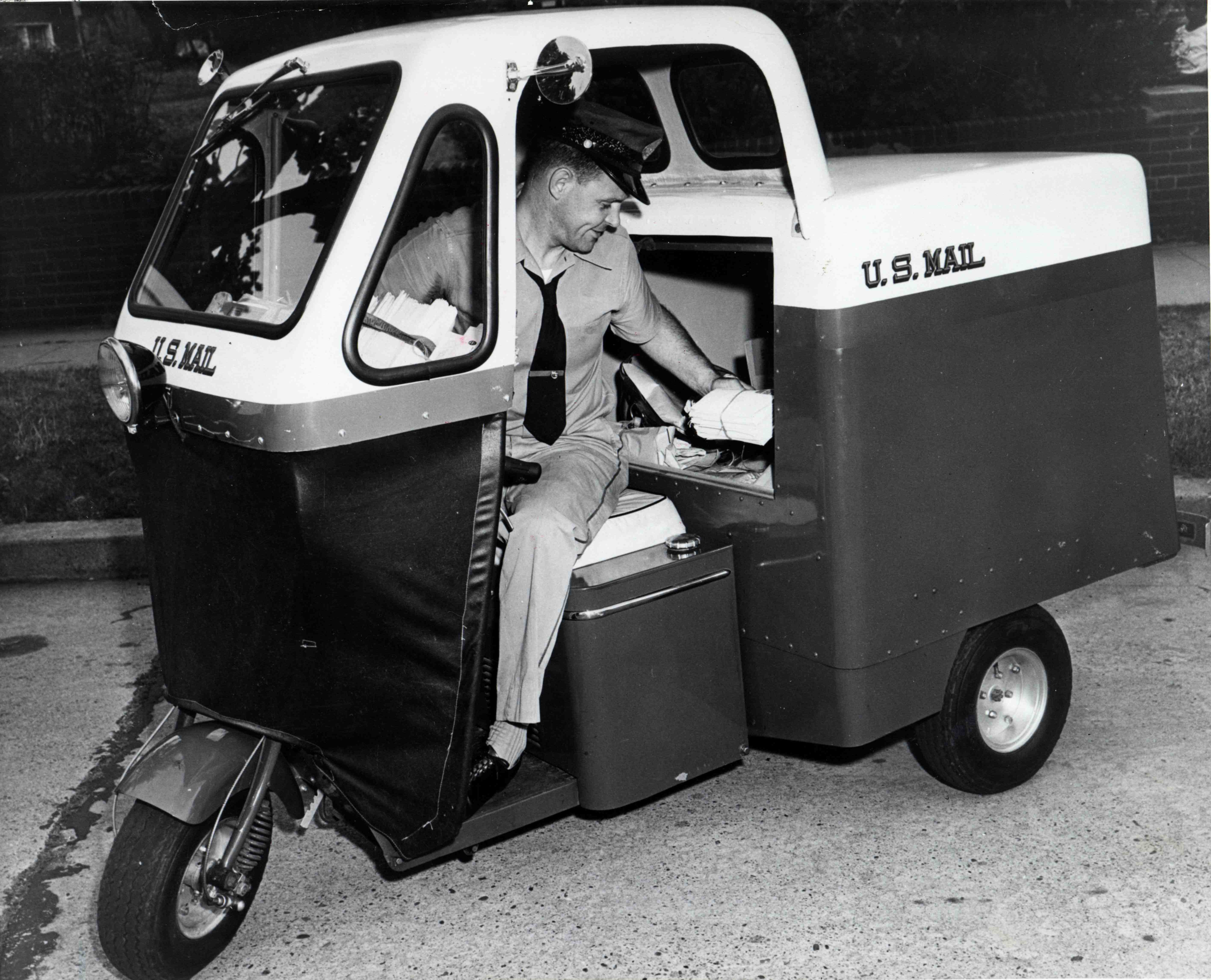
Westcoaster Mailster

Auto rickshaws are rarely seen in the United States, however there are companies that operate them as taxis, affordable transportation services, or rentals, usually in urban areas like Tuk Tuk Chicago in Chicago, Capital Tuk-Tuk in Sacramento, eTuk Ride Denver in Denver, the Boston rickshaw company in Boston and several more.

The New York Police Department (NYPD) operates auto rickshaws that they call “three-wheel patrol scooters”. The patrol scooters are used for parking and traffic enforcement on city streets and to patrol places that most cars can't – like the narrow paths in Central Park. The NYPD patrol scooters started being replaced in 2016 with Smart Fortwos. The NYPD believes that the Smart Fourtwos are safer, more comfortable, and more affordable, than the three-wheel patrol scooters due to the Smart Fortwos coming with features that the patrol scooters lack like air conditioning, and airbags, while also costing about $6,000 less. The Smart Fortwos can also be driven on highways if needed. The Smart Fortwos are also said to be more “approachable” and “friendlier looking” which helps with public relations.

==== Cuba ====
In Cuba, the autorickshaws are small and look like a coconut, hence the name Cocotaxi.

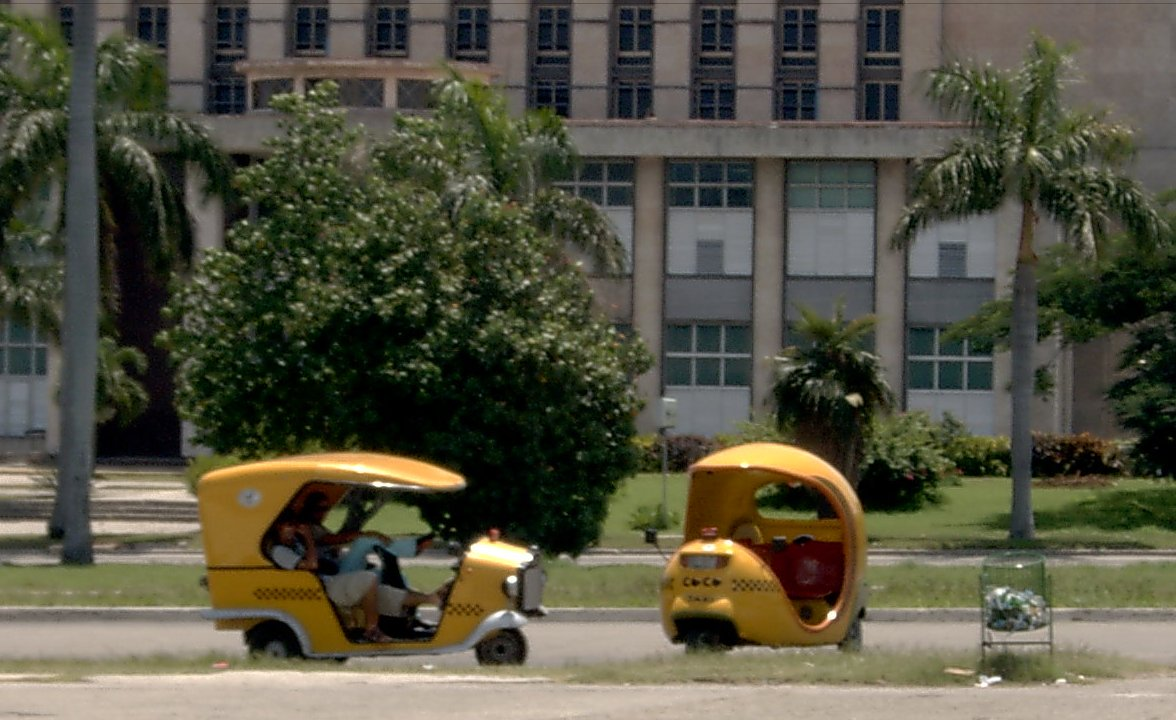
Cocotaxis in Havana, Cuba

==== Mexico ====
Some auto rickshaws have been and are still used in Mexico, Such as in Rickshaws in Mexico City.

=== South America ===
==== Peru ====
In Peru, a version of this vehicle is called a motocar or mototaxi.

==== Bolivia ====
Auto Rickshaws are seen in Bolivia.

==== Brazil ====
Uber allows auto rickshaws to be used by drivers.

==== Colombia ====
Tuk tuks or moto-taxis are used in some towns and cities in Colombia such as Jardín, Guatapé, or San Rafael in Antioquia.

=== Australia and Oceania ===
==== Australia ====
Ikea did a trial run using Electric Auto Rickshaws in Sydney, Australia to deliver packages to customers from May to August 2023.

A company called Just Tuk'n Around using both pedal powered rickshaws and electric auto rickshaws carries tourists around in Airlie Beach.

==== New Zealand ====
Mount Cook Alpine Salmon uses Auto rickshaws on its farms to move equipment and people around.

A company using auto rickshaws called Tuk Tuk Taxi operates in Wānaka in the South Island.

A company using auto rickshaws called Tuk Tuk NZ used to operate in Wellington.

A company using auto rickshaws called Kiwi Tuk Tuk used to operate in Auckland.

== Fuel efficiency and pollution ==
In July 1998, the Supreme Court of India ordered the government of Delhi to implement CNG or LPG (Autogas) fuel for all autos and for the entire bus fleet in and around the city. Delhi's air quality has improved with the switch to CNG. Initially, auto rickshaw drivers in Delhi had to wait in long queues for CNG refueling, but the situation improved following an increase in the number of CNG stations. Gradually, many state governments passed similar laws, thus shifting to CNG or LPG vehicles in most large cities to improve air quality and reduce pollution. Certain local governments are pushing for four-stroke engines instead of two-stroke ones. Typical mileage for an Indian-made auto rickshaw is around 35 kilometres per litre (99 mpg_{‑imp}; 82 mpg_{‑US}) of petrol. Pakistan has passed a similar law prohibiting auto rickshaws in certain areas. CNG auto rickshaws have started to appear in huge numbers in many Pakistani cities.

In January 2007 the Sri Lankan government also banned two-stroke trishaws to reduce air pollution. In the Philippines there are projects to convert carbureted two-stroke engines to direct-injected via Envirofit technology. Research has shown LPG or CNG gas direct-injection can be retrofitted to existing engines, in similar fashion to the Envirofit system. In Vigan City majority of tricycles-for-hire as of 2008 are powered by motorcycles with four-stroke engines, as tricycles with two-stroke motorcycles are prevented from receiving operating permits. Direct injection is standard equipment on new machines in India.

In March 2009 an international consortium coordinated by the International Centre for Hydrogen Energy Technologies initiated a two-year public-private partnership of local and international stakeholders aiming at operating a fleet of 15 hydrogen-fueled three-wheeled vehicles in New Delhi's Pragati Maidan complex. As of January 2011, the project was nearing completion.

Hydrogen internal combustion (HICV) use in three-wheelers has only recently begun to be looked into, mainly by developing countries, to decrease local pollution at an affordable cost. At some point, Bajaj Auto made a HICV auto rickshaw together with the company "Energy Conversion Devices". They made a report on it called "Clean Hydrogen Technology for 3-Wheel Transportation in India" and it stated that the performance was comparable with CNG autos. In 2012, Mahindra & Mahindra showcased their first HICV auto rickshaw, called the Mahindra HyAlfa. The development of the hydrogen-powered rickshaw happened with support from the International Centre for Hydrogen Energy Technologies.

== World records ==
On 16 September 2022, at 11:04 a.m. (Indian Standard Time), a Canadian team (Greg Harris and Priya Singh) and a Swiss team (Michele Daryanani and Nevena Lazarevic) set the world record for the highest altitude at which an auto rickshaw has ever been driven. The world record was officially recognized and certified by Guinness World Records on October 10, 2024. The two teams set the record by driving to the summit of Umling La Pass at an altitude of 5,798 meters (19,022 feet).

The two teams were participating in the Rickshaw Run (Himalayan Edition), an event promoted by The Adventurists, where teams drive auto rickshaws from the Thar desert town of Jaisalmer in Rajasthan to the Himalayan town of Leh in Ladakh. Rickshaw Run teams are given the start and finish lines, but are otherwise unsupported and left to their own navigational choices in completing the approximately 2,300 km journey.

The road at Umling La Pass was constructed by India's Border Roads Organization and completed in 2017. Guinness World Records certified the road as the highest motorable road in the world.

== See also ==
- Electric rickshaw
- Fuel gas-powered scooter
- Formic acid vehicle: a type of hydrogen-based vehicle
- Jeepney
- Rickshaw (disambiguation)
