= Kharnak =

- Village
- Location in Ladakh, India Kharnak (India)
- Coordinates: 33.2571983°N 77.7042539°E
- Country: India
- Union Territory: Ladakh
- District: Changthang
- Tehsil: Nyoma
- Elevation: 4,548 m (14,921 ft)

Population (2011)
  - Total: 194

Languages
  - Official: Ladakhi, Hindi, English
- Time zone: UTC+5:30 (IST)
- 2011 census code: 895

Kharnak is a village in the Changthang district of Ladakh, India. It is located in the Nyoma tehsil.

== Demographics ==
According to the 2011 census of India, Kharnak has 35 households. The effective literacy rate (i.e. the literacy rate of population excluding children aged 6 and below) is 63.43%.

Demographics (2011 Census)
	Total	Male	Female
Population	194	90	104
Children aged below 6 years	19	6	13
Scheduled caste	0	0	0
Scheduled tribe	152	70	82
Literates	111	66	45
Workers (all)	93	47	46
Main workers (total)	43	41	2
Main workers: Cultivators	0	0	0
Main workers: Agricultural labourers	0	0	0
Main workers: Household industry workers	0	0	0
Main workers: Other	43	41	2
Marginal workers (total)	50	6	44
Marginal workers: Cultivators	0	0	0
Marginal workers: Agricultural labourers	0	0	0
Marginal workers: Household industry workers	0	0	0
Marginal workers: Others	50	6	44
Non-workers	101	43	58

== Tourism ==
Area has Buddhist monastery and valley tourism.

== See also ==
- List of buddhist monasteries in Ladakh
- Geography of Ladakh
- Tourism in Ladakh
