= Liktse =

- Village
- Location in Ladakh, India Liktse (India)
- Coordinates: 33.72725°N 77.95434°E
- Country: India
- Union Territory: Ladakh
- District: Changthang
- Tehsil: Himya

Population (2011)
  - Total: 152
- Time zone: UTC+5:30 (IST)
- 2011 census code: 883

Liktse is a village in Changthang district of the Indian union territory of Ladakh. It is located in the Himya tehsil.

== Demographics ==
According to the 2011 census of India, Liktse has 28 households. The literacy rate of the village is 70.39%.

Demographics (2011 Census)
	Total	Male	Female
Population	152	71	81
Children aged below 6 years	9	4	5
Scheduled caste	0	0	0
Scheduled tribe	152	71	81
Literates	107	59	48
Workers (all)	92	41	51
Main workers (total)	91	41	50
Main workers: Cultivators	56	19	37
Main workers: Agricultural labourers	0	0	0
Main workers: Household industry workers	1	1	0
Main workers: Other	34	21	13
Marginal workers (total)	1	0	1
Marginal workers: Cultivators	0	0	0
Marginal workers: Agricultural labourers	0	0	0
Marginal workers: Household industry workers	0	0	0
Marginal workers: Others	1	0	1
Non-workers	60	30	30
