= Samad Rakchan =

- Village
- Location in Ladakh, India Samad Rakchan (India)
- Coordinates: 33.1565857°N 78.2412109°E
- Country: India
- Union Territory: Ladakh
- District: Changthang
- Tehsil: Nyoma
- Elevation: 5,166 m (16,949 ft)

Population (2011)
  - Total: 361

Languages
  - Official: Hindi, English
- Time zone: UTC+5:30 (IST)
- 2011 census code: 898

Samad Rakchan is a village in the Changthang district of the Indian union territory of Ladakh. It is located in the Nyoma tehsil.

== Demographics ==
According to the 2011 census of India, Samad Rakchan has 71 households. The effective literacy rate (i.e. the literacy rate of population excluding children aged 6 and below) is 54.91%.

Demographics (2011 Census)
	Total	Male	Female
Population	361	188	173
Children aged below 6 years	35	18	17
Scheduled caste	1	0	1
Scheduled tribe	229	119	110
Literates	179	112	67
Workers (all)	214	110	104
Main workers (total)	130	103	27
Main workers: Cultivators	0	0	0
Main workers: Agricultural labourers	0	0	0
Main workers: Household industry workers	0	0	0
Main workers: Other	130	103	27
Marginal workers (total)	84	7	77
Marginal workers: Cultivators	0	0	0
Marginal workers: Agricultural labourers	0	0	0
Marginal workers: Household industry workers	0	0	0
Marginal workers: Others	84	7	77
Non-workers	147	78	69
