= Teri, Ladakh =

Teri
- village
- Location in Ladakh, India Teri (India)
- Coordinates: 33.359824°N 78.258081°E
- Country: India
- Union Territory: Ladakh
- District: Changthang
- Tehsil: Himya

Population (2011)
  - Total: 202

Languages
  - Official: Hindi, English
- Time zone: UTC+5:30 (IST)
- Census code: 886

Teri is a village in the Changthang district of Ladakh, India. It is located in the Himya tehsil.

== Demographics ==
According to the 2011 census of India, Teri has 31 households. The effective literacy rate (i.e. the literacy rate of population excluding children aged 6 and below) is 67.04%.

Demographics (2011 Census)
	Total	Male	Female
Population	202	96	106
Children aged below 6 years	23	9	14
Scheduled caste	0	0	0
Scheduled tribe	202	96	106
Literates	120	66	54
Workers (all)	107	55	52
Main workers (total)	104	53	51
Main workers: Cultivators	75	35	40
Main workers: Agricultural labourers	4	1	3
Main workers: Household industry workers	0	0	0
Main workers: Other	25	17	8
Marginal workers (total)	3	2	1
Marginal workers: Cultivators	0	0	0
Marginal workers: Agricultural labourers	1	0	1
Marginal workers: Household industry workers	0	0	0
Marginal workers: Others	2	2	0
Non-workers	95	41	54
