= Shachokol =

Shachokol Shachukul
- Village
- Location in Ladakh, India Shachokol (India)
- Coordinates: 33.9183387°N 78.3605653°E
- Country: India
- Union Territory: Ladakh
- District: Changthang
- Tehsil: Tangtse
- Elevation: 5,765 m (18,914 ft)

Population (2011)
  - Total: 888
- Time zone: UTC+5:30 (IST)
- 2011 census code: 875

Shachokol or Shachukul is a village in Changthang district of the Indian union territory of Ladakh. It is located in the Tangtse tehsil.

== Demographics ==
According to the 2011 census of India, Shachokol had 147 households. The effective literacy rate (i.e. the literacy rate of population excluding children aged 6 and below) was 68.48%.

Demographics (2011 Census)
	Total	Male	Female
Population	888	451	437
Children aged below 6 years	98	47	51
Scheduled caste	0	0	0
Scheduled tribe	887	451	436
Literates	541	320	221
Workers (all)	489	267	222
Main workers (total)	277	197	80
Main workers: Cultivators	139	101	38
Main workers: Agricultural labourers	4	3	1
Main workers: Household industry workers	0	0	0
Main workers: Other	134	93	41
Marginal workers (total)	212	70	142
Marginal workers: Cultivators	171	61	110
Marginal workers: Agricultural labourers	8	0	8
Marginal workers: Household industry workers	17	1	16
Marginal workers: Others	16	8	8
Non-workers	399	184	215
