= Chakula =

Mountain peak

- Location within India Location within Ladakh

Highest point
- Elevation: 6,534 m (21,437 ft)
- Prominence: 1,517 m (4,977 ft)
- Coordinates: 33°23′50.93″N 78°26′29.624″E

Geography
- Location: Ladakh

Chakula is a mountain peak located at 6,534 m (21,437 ft) above sea level in the far west of the Transhimalaya mountain range.

== Location ==
The peak is located between the villages of Chumathang and Chushul in the Leh district, in the region of Ladakh which is administered as a union territory by India. The prominence is 1,517 m (4,977 ft).
