= Dumchele =

Dumchele སྡུམ་མཚེས་ལེ་, 都木契列 Dhumtsele
- Village
- Location within Tibet Location within Ladakh
- Coordinates: 33°04′34″N 79°10′08″E
- Country: China (disputed by India)
- Region: Tibet
- Prefecture: Ngari
- County: Rutog
- Elevation: 4,100 m (13,500 ft)

Dumchele
- Chinese: 都木契列
- Hanyu Pinyin: Dōu mù qì liè
Transcriptions
Standard Mandarin
- Hanyu Pinyin: Dōu mù qì liè

Dumchele (Note: Variations of the spelling include Dumchule, Dumchulle, and Doom Cheley. Older British documents often called it Dumche La.) or Dhumtsele (Chinese: 都木契列; pinyin: Dōu mù qì liè, Tibetan: སྡུམ་མཚེས་ལེ་, Wylie: sdum mtshes le, THL: dum tsé lé) is a village and a grazing area in the Skakjung pastureland, which runs along the right bank of Indus River from China-administered Dumchele and Tsoskar Lake in south to India-administered Dungti-Loma in north, near the Line of Actual Control between Ladakh and Tibet. Dumchele and the area around it have been under Chinese administration since 1962 but claimed by India. The locale is in the disputed Demchok sector, about 50 kilometers northwest from Demchok and 50 kilometers southeast of Chushul. It lies on a historic trade route between Ladakh and Rutog, with an erstwhile border pass at Chang La or Shingong La (Chinese: 新贡拉; pinyin: Xīn gòng lā) to the southeast of Dumchele.

To the west of the Chang La pass, flows the Kigunaru River (Chinese: 基古纳鲁河; pinyin: Jī gǔ nà lǔ hé) forming a rich grazing ground that is also called Kigunaru. (Note: Alternative spellings include Keegunaru, Kegu Naro and Gegu Naruo (in Chinese sources). It may also be found in the Chinese pinyin transcription as Jigunalu.) Another name for the river is Shingong Lungpa. In recent decades, some of the waters of the Kigunaru river have been flowing towards Dumchele and gathering into a endorheic lake.

Until 1962 India maintained a 'forward' post at Chang La, a day's march from Dumchele. In the 1962 war, China attacked the post and forced India to withdraw from the entire Kigunaru river basin. At the present time, China maintains a border trading market at Dumchele and a military post nearby.

== Geography ==
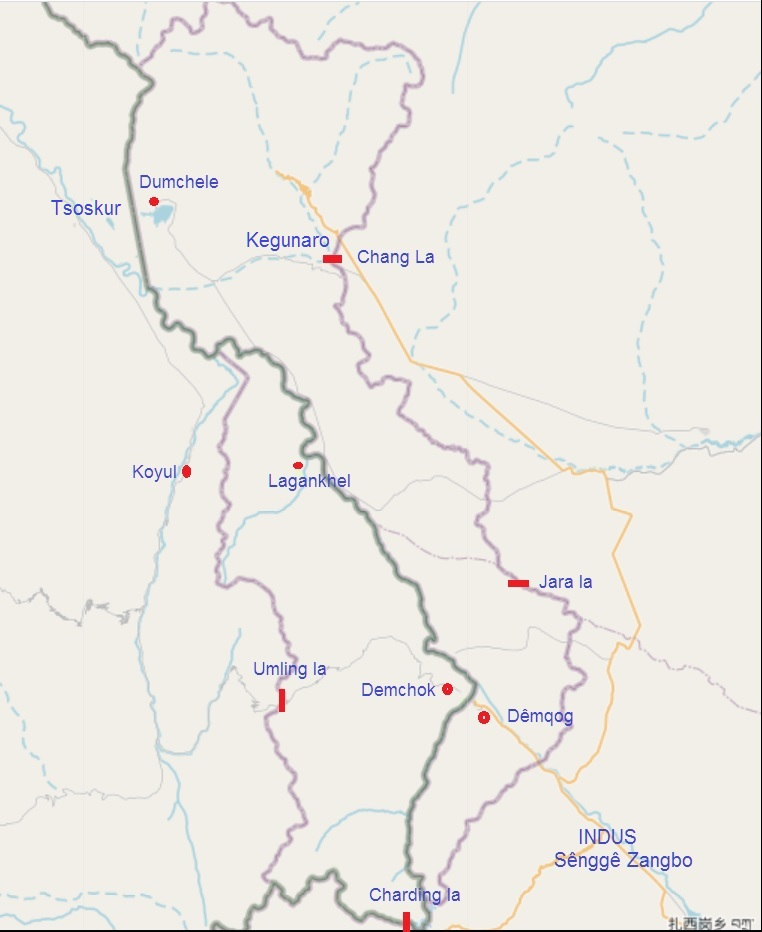
Map-1: The disputed Demchok sector between China and India: the Chinese claim line on the west, the Indian claim line on the east and the Line of Actual Control in the middle.

Dumchele is at present an ancient trading village for cross-border trade in Chinese-administered part of the northern Demchok sector. It is on the right bank of Indus River, north of Koyul Ridge and Kigunaru River.

Traditionally, the region was a grazing area. The Indus valley here is about four miles wide, and sandy with a thin layer of grass. That, coupled with the fact that there is no snow here in winter, makes it a most important winter grazing area for the Changpa nomads. The Ladakhis call this area Skakjung (or Kokzhung).

The present Dumchele village is on the bank of a mid-sized lake, which is apparently fed by a strand of the Kigunaru River (or Shingong Lungpa). The river flows down from the mountains of the Kailash Range, which forms the eastern watershed of the Indus Valley. The river passes by the Chang La pass, where it makes a 90 degree bend, and flows west through a gap in the Kailash Range into the Indus valley. Afterwards, it gets "divided by an island", with a strand flowing straight, and another flowing north parallel to the Indus River. The north-flowing strand gathers into the Dumchele lake, which appears to be endorheic. The formation of the lake appears to be a recent phenomenon as it is not shown on any maps prior to 1960.

To the west of Dumchele is an older, more natural lake called Tsoskur, also called Tsoskar Lake (see map-3). The Line of Actual Control between the Indian and Chinese-administered parts in this sector runs between the two lakes.

Skakjung (also known as Kokzhung; 33°04′34″N 79°10′08″E) is a high-altitude grazing plateau near Dumchele in eastern Ladakh, India.

== History ==
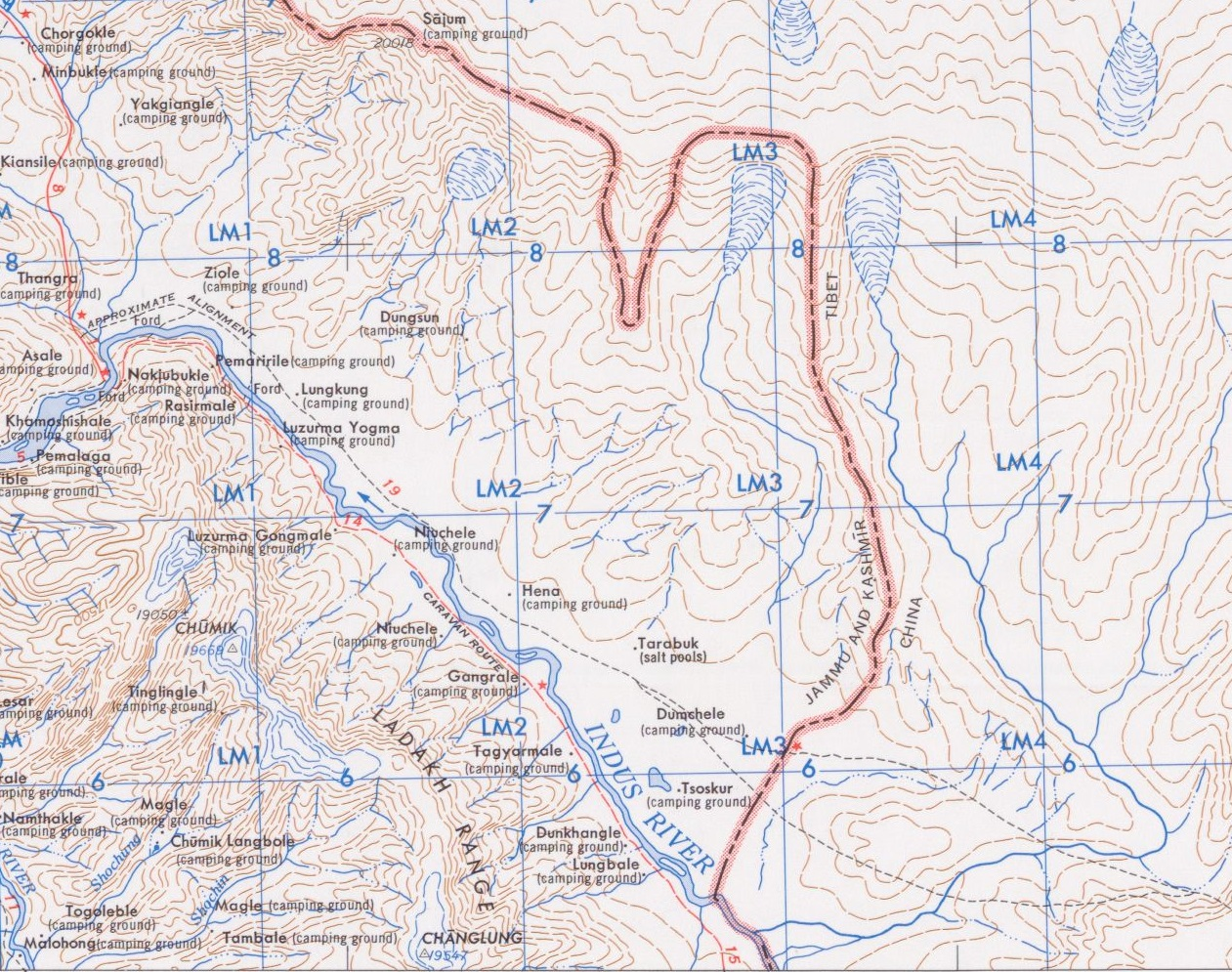
Map-2: The northern part of Demchok sector drawn by US Army Map Service, 1954

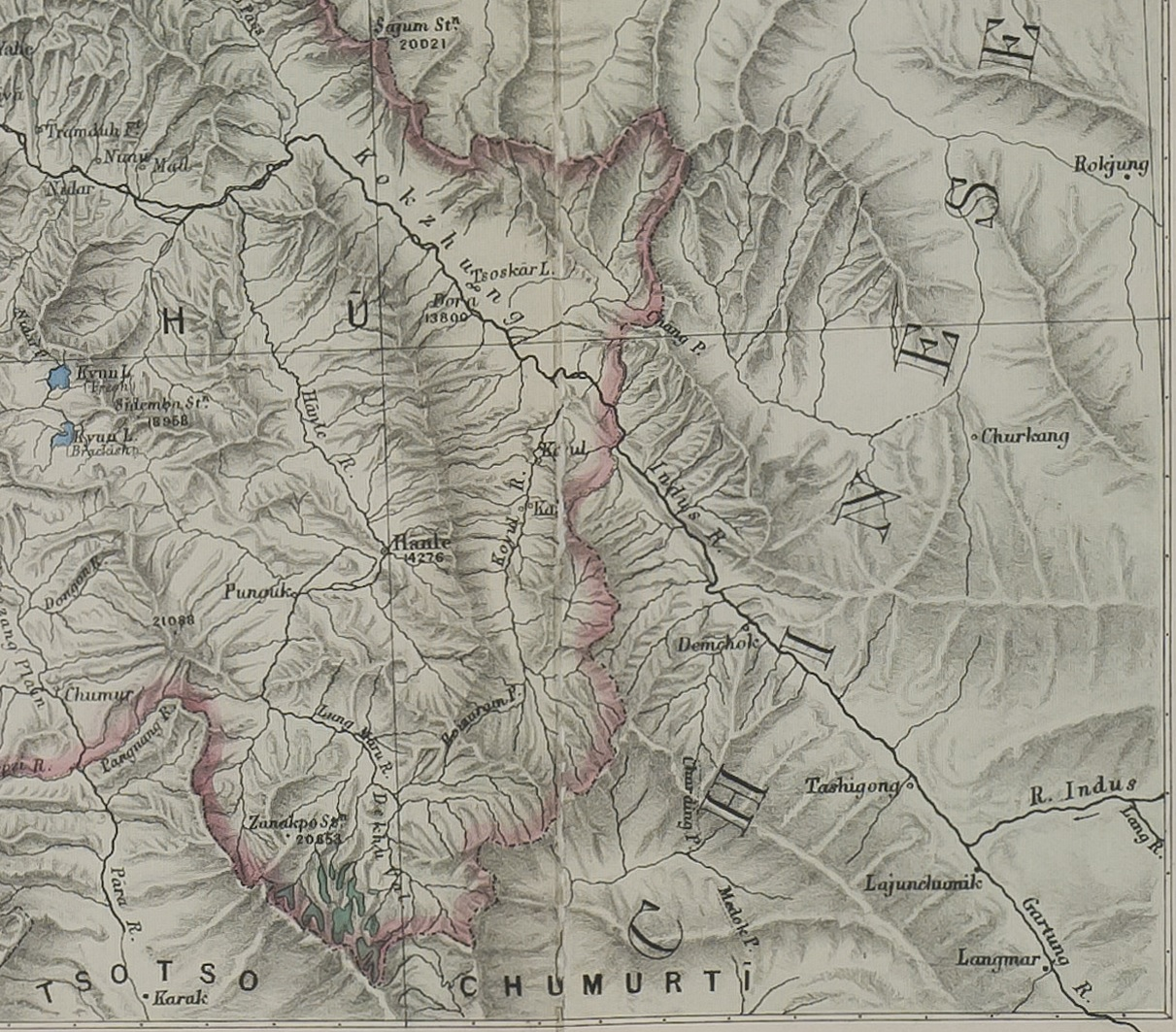
Map-3: Frederec Drew's map of the Demchok sector, 1875

The Dumchele plain lies along an ancient trade route between Lahaul and Rudok, which is known at least since the 17th century. The Ladakhis also used this route on occasion, even though their main route was via Chushul (called the "Junglam"). It has traditionally been used by Changpa pastoralists for seasonal grazing and was situated along historical caravan routes connecting Ladakh with Rudok in western Tibet, facilitating the movement of wool, salt, and other goods.

=== British Raj ===
Moorcroft's associate, George Trebeck, visited the area in early 19th century, travelling south on the right bank of Indus. He stayed at a place called Chibra very near Dumchele. (Note: The coordinates of Chibra given in the Gazetteer of Kashmir and Ladakh, 33°5′N 79°10′E, are virtually the same as those of Dumchele. The name Chibra disappeared from the British literature after 1850s.) The area was studded with small ponds and lakes, and a rivulet crossed the Indus bed (Kigunaru river, also called Xingong Lungpa), getting divided by an island. (Note: The rivulet coming down from the Chang La pass is called "Xingong Lungpa" on Chinese maps. It is obtained by the merger of two further streams coming down from mountain heights. On the Indus bed, the rivulet divides, with a large strand flowing into a lake that has formed near Dumchele.) He described the Indus river bed as consisting of loose sand, with a form of sand-grass called Long-ma growing on it. It provided winter grazing for the Ladakhis, apparently the only winter grazing available in the whole of Rupshu. He also noticed a trading party belonging to the Kalon of Ladakh return from Rudok, carrying fifty-six sheep loads of shawl wool (pashm) and further loads of coarse wool.

The border of Ladakh was described to Trebeck as running from "the angle of a hill about five miles to the east" to the low pass of La Ganskiel (the "Lagankhel" of later maps).

Scholar Janet Rizvi confirms that traders often travelled with donkeys via Chang La to Rudok and returned with salt and wool. Ladakhi monks that went to Tibet for education and training also used the route, travelling with traders.

In 1847, Henry Strachey visited the left bank of Indus, as part of a British boundary commission for Kashmir. In contrast to Trebeck's testimony, he found that Ladakh's territory stretched up to a rivulet flowing into the Indus next to the Demchok. The Tibetan guards at Demchok did not allow him to proceed beyond this point. (Note: Demchok extended to the southern side of the rivulet in Strachey's view, which was under the control of Tibet. The Chinese call this village Dêmqog, which is the Tibetan pinyin spelling of Demchok.)

After conducting Kashmir Survey between 1855 and 1865, the British government published a Kashmir Atlas, with a defined border. This border ignored Strachey's findings and tried to represent Trebeck's information. It excluded Demchok on the left bank of Indus, leaving the border at Lagankhel, and excluded all the right bank up to the confluence of the Kigunaru river. In between Lagankhel and Kigunaru river, the border ran along the Indus river itself. (See the map by the US Army Map Service.)

Kashmir's geologist Frederic Drew created a map in connection with his book, The Jummoo and Kashmir Territories, in 1875. His border, professedly based on the territories actually used by the Ladakhis and Tibetans for grazing, placed the Chang La ("Chang Pass") and the entire basin of the Kigunaru River within Ladakh.

Despite the various British efforts at border definition, the situation on the ground was essentially unchanged. The state of Kashmir was ruled by a native Maharaja who enjoyed considerable autonomy. The traditional borders appear to have continued until the time of India's independence in 1947.

=== 1962 war and aftermath ===
In October 1962, during the Sino-Indian War, the Chinese occupied the Dumchele area, along with the entire right bank of the Indus to the south of Dumchele. The Line of Actual Control resulting from the war runs between Dumchele and the smaller lake of Tsoskur to the west.

During and following the Indo-Pakistani War of 1965, the Dumchele area saw some action mainly in the form of the Indian and Chinese governments exchanging notes blaming each other for intruding into their territory. Near Tsoskur, 2.5 miles (4.0 km) southwest of Dumchele, three Indian armed personnel were killed by PLA troops on 19 September 1965. The Chinese alleged that India had committed its "worst border provocation since 1962" at Dumchele.

=== Trading post ===
Dumchele, on an ancient India-Tibet trade route, is not one of the mutually-agreed officially-designated border trade points (BTP) between India and China, though it has been proposed as another BTP The mutually-agreed officially-designated border trade points (BTP) are Lipulekh Pass (since 1991) in Uttrakhand, Shipki La (since 1993) in Himachal Pradesh, and Nathu La (since 2006) in Sikkim for trading the locally made items through these points for boosting the local economy.

Before 2014, China built a border trading post at Dumchele, meant for the Ladakhis to access. The PLA military stationed near Dumchele allows this trade. For a few days during the winter the trade intensifies. A 2014 study by Siddiq Wahid reports "illicit trade" (smuggling) of "tiger bones, tiger skins, rhino horns and sandalwood". Items exchanged also include rice, wheat and cooking oil, and in exchange pashmina shawls and Chinese crockery and electronics are acquired. In 2016, the smuggling occurring here, said to be worth crores of rupees, was reportedly stopped by Indian authorities.

== Locations ==
Tsaskur, alternately spelled as Tsoskur, is an Indian administered campsite located 2.5 miles (4.0 km) south west of Dumchele. Areas between Dumchele and Demchok such as Nagtsang, Nakung, and Lungma-Serding, Skakjung are China administered territories. Kegu Naro is a day's march from Dumchele.

== Bibliography ==
- Gazetteer of Kashmir and Ladak, Calcutta: Superintendent of Government Printing, 1890
- India, Ministry of External Affairs, ed. (1962), Report of the Officials of the Governments of India and the People's Republic of China on the Boundary Question, Government of India Press
  - Indian Report: Part 1 (PDF); Part 2 (PDF); Part 3 (PDF); Part 4 (PDF)
  - Chinese report: Part 1 (PDF); Part 2 (PDF); Part 3 (PDF);
- Bhattacharji, Romesh (2012), Ladakh: Changing, Yet Unchanged, New Delhi: Rupa Publications – via Academia.edu
- Drew, Frederic (1873), "Alluvial and Lacustrine Deposits and Glacial Records of the Upper-Indus Basin", Quarterly Journal of the Geological Society of London: 441–471
- Drew, Frederic (1875), The Jummoo and Kashmir Territories: A Geographical Account, E. Stanford – via archive.org
- Lamb, Alastair (1964), The China-India border, Oxford University Press
- Lamb, Alastair (1989), Tibet, China & India, 1914-1950: a history of imperial diplomacy, Roxford Books, ISBN 9780907129035
- Moorcroft, William; Trebeck, George (2004) [1841], Travels in the Himalayan Provinces of Hindustan and the Punjab in Ladakh and Kashmir: In Peshawar, Kabul, Kunduz and Bokhara from 1819 to 1825, Volume 1, London: John Murray, ISBN 978-81-206-0497-1 – via archive.org
