= Skitmang =

- Village
- Location in Ladakh, India Skitmang (India)
- Coordinates: 33.38613°N 78.27395°E
- Country: India
- Union Territory: Ladakh
- District: Changthang
- Tehsil: Chumathang

Population (2011)
  - Total: 189

Languages
  - Official: Hindi, English
- Time zone: UTC+5:30 (IST)
- 2011 census code: 897

Skitmang is a village in the Changthang district of the Indian union territory of Ladakh. It is located in the Chumathang tehsil.

== Demographics ==
According to the 2011 census of India, Skitmang has 37 households. The effective literacy rate (i.e. the literacy rate of population excluding children aged 6 and below) is 62.15%.

Demographics (2011 Census)
	Total	Male	Female
Population	189	99	90
Children aged below 6 years	12	3	9
Scheduled caste	0	0	0
Scheduled tribe	189	99	90
Literates	110	68	42
Workers (all)	114	57	57
Main workers (total)	102	50	52
Main workers: Cultivators	89	45	44
Main workers: Agricultural labourers	0	0	0
Main workers: Household industry workers	0	0	0
Main workers: Other	13	5	8
Marginal workers (total)	12	7	5
Marginal workers: Cultivators	3	2	1
Marginal workers: Agricultural labourers	0	0	0
Marginal workers: Household industry workers	0	0	0
Marginal workers: Others	9	5	4
Non-workers	75	42	33
