= Kumgyam =

Kungyam Khungjab Kungiam
- Village
- Kungyam
- Location in Ladakh, India Kungyam (India)
- Coordinates: 33.534353°N 78.337936°E
- Country: India
- Union Territory: Ladakh
- District: Changthang
- Tehsil: Himya

Population (2011)
  - Total: 374

Languages
  - Official: Hindi, English
- Time zone: UTC+5:30 (IST)
- Postal code: 194201
- Census code: 885

Kumgyam or Kungyam is a village in the Changthang district in the Indian union territory of Ladakh. It is located in the rong block chumathang, which is primarily administered by Himya tehsil. It has more than 40 households. The local Ladakhi language is mainly used, but the people can also understand and communicate in Hindi. Sabgyat is a stupa located at the end of village, which consists of 108 stupas and it is believed to be built by Dakini. In Kungyam, there is a primary and middle school, as well as a health and wellness center.

== Demographics ==
According to the 2011 census of India, Kumgyam has 68 households. The effective literacy rate (i.e. the literacy rate of population excluding children aged 6 and below) is 81.85%.

Demographics (2011 Census)
	Total	Male	Female
Population	374	173	201
Children aged below 6 years	38	19	19
Scheduled caste	0	0	0
Scheduled tribe	374	173	201
Literates	275	143	132
Workers (all)	228	98	130
Main workers (total)	226	97	129
Main workers: Cultivators	165	63	102
Main workers: Agricultural labourers	17	10	7
Main workers: Household industry workers	1	0	1
Main workers: Other	43	24	19
Marginal workers (total)	2	1	1
Marginal workers: Cultivators	0	0	0
Marginal workers: Agricultural labourers	1	1	0
Marginal workers: Household industry workers	0	0	0
Marginal workers: Others	1	0	1
Non-workers	146	75	71
