= Tukla, Ladakh =

Tukla
- village
- Location in Ladakh, India Tukla (India)
- Coordinates: 33.586717°N 78.345222°E
- Country: India
- Union Territory: Ladakh
- District: Changthang
- Tehsil: Hinya

Population (2011)
  - Total: 266
- Time zone: UTC+5:30 (IST)
- Census code: 884

Tukla is a village in the Changthang district of Ladakh, India. It is located in the Himya tehsil.

== Demographics ==
According to the 2011 census of India, Tukla has 54 households. The effective literacy rate (i.e. the literacy rate of population excluding children aged 6 and below) is 70.59%.

Demographics (2011 Census)
| | Total | Male | Female |
|---|---|---|---|
| Population | 266 | 123 | 143 |
| Children aged below 6 years | 28 | 10 | 18 |
| Scheduled caste | 0 | 0 | 0 |
| Scheduled tribe | 265 | 122 | 143 |
| Literates | 168 | 96 | 72 |
| Workers (all) | 242 | 112 | 130 |
| Main workers (total) | 242 | 112 | 130 |
| Main workers: Cultivators | 131 | 51 | 80 |
| Main workers: Agricultural labourers | 1 | 0 | 1 |
| Main workers: Household industry workers | 0 | 0 | 0 |
| Main workers: Other | 110 | 61 | 49 |
| Marginal workers (total) | 0 | 0 | 0 |
| Marginal workers: Cultivators | 0 | 0 | 0 |
| Marginal workers: Agricultural labourers | 0 | 0 | 0 |
| Marginal workers: Household industry workers | 0 | 0 | 0 |
| Marginal workers: Others | 0 | 0 | 0 |
| Non-workers | 24 | 11 | 13 |
