= Kerey =

Kerey Kairay Kariy Kiāri
- Town
- Location in Ladakh, India Kerey (India)
- Coordinates: 33.2994346°N 78.2840959°E
- Country: India
- Union Territory: Ladakh
- District: Changthang
- Tehsil: Chumathang
- Elevation: 5,488 m (18,005 ft)

Population (2011)
  - Total: 290
- Time zone: UTC+5:30 (IST)
- 2011 census code: 896

Kerey (also called Kiāri, Kairay, Kariy) is a Town in Changthang district in the Indian union territory of Ladakh. It is located in the Chumathang tehsil.

== Demographics ==
According to the 2011 census of India, Kerey has 60 households. The effective literacy rate (i.e. the literacy rate of population excluding children aged 6 and below) is 77.69%.

Demographics (2011 Census)
	Total	Male	Female
Population	290	140	150
Children aged below 6 years	30	13	17
Scheduled caste	0	0	0
Scheduled tribe	290	140	150
Literates	202	113	89
Workers (all)	174	89	85
Main workers (total)	118	73	45
Main workers: Cultivators	49	33	16
Main workers: Agricultural labourers	5	0	5
Main workers: Household industry workers	0	0	0
Main workers: Other	64	40	24
Marginal workers (total)	56	16	40
Marginal workers: Cultivators	33	0	33
Marginal workers: Agricultural labourers	7	3	4
Marginal workers: Household industry workers	0	0	0
Marginal workers: Others	16	13	3
Non-workers	116	51	65
