= Durbuk =

Durbuk Rdo-khug, Hdor-khug Darbuk
- Village
- Location in Ladakh Durbuk (India)
- Coordinates: 34.1206°N 78.1034°E
- Country: India
- Union Territory: Ladakh
- District: Changthang
- Tehsil: Tangtse
- Elevation: 3,800 m (12,500 ft)

Population (2011)
  - Total: 852
- Time zone: UTC+5:30 (IST)
- Census code: 873

Durbuk or Darbuk, (Note: In old British documents, the name is spelt as Durgu, Durgo, or Durgukh. The traditional name is Hdor-khug also spelt Rdo-khug.) is a town in the Changthang district of Ladakh, India. It is located in Tangtse tehsil. It is located between Chang La mountain pass and Tangste village on the way to Pangong Tso Lake.

Darbok is a strategic location as the 255 km long Darbuk–Shyok–DBO Road in the north, connects it to the Shyok village 16 km away and beyond to Daulat Beg Oldi (DBO) military post on the China border.

== Geography ==
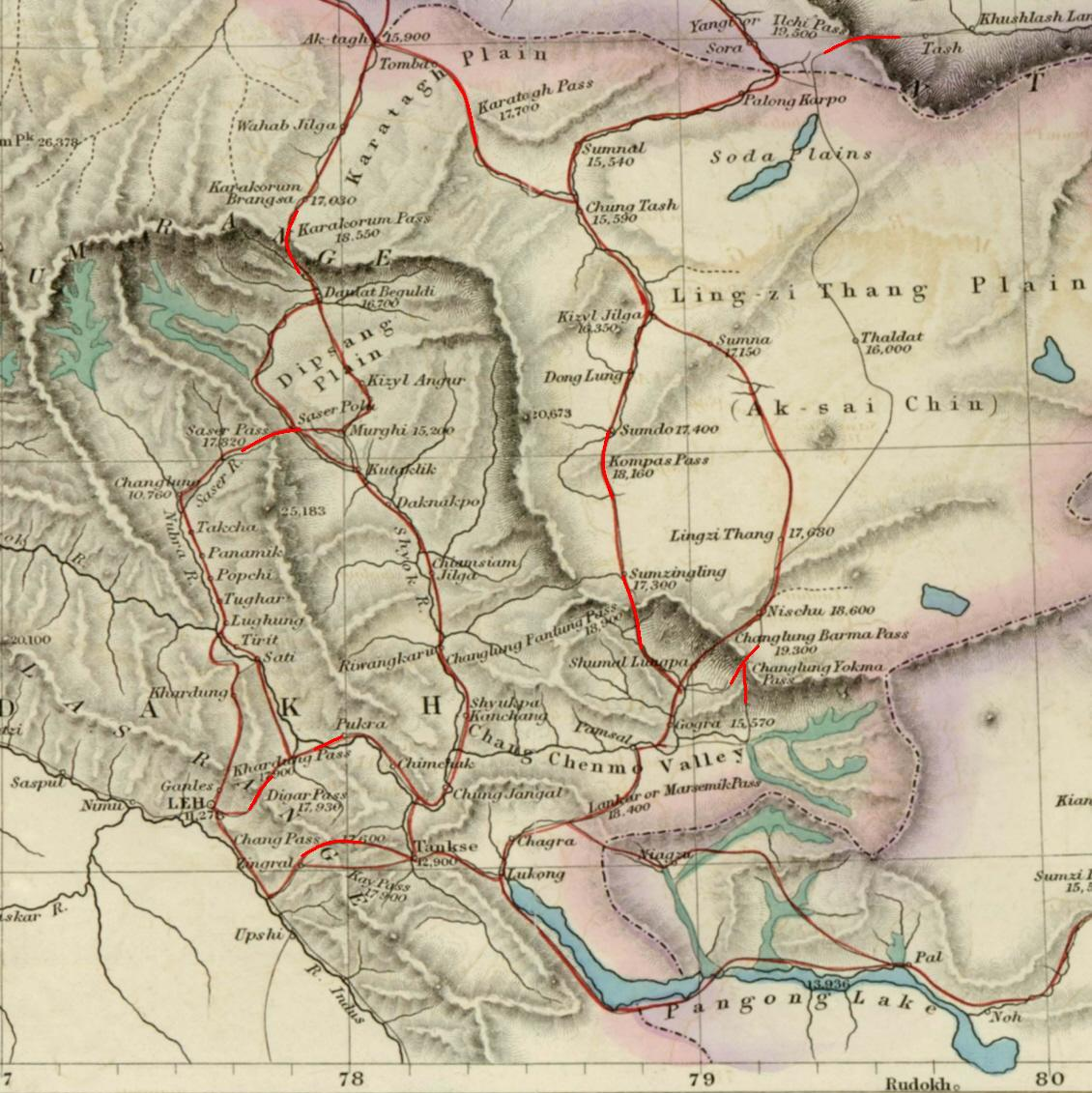
Trade routes from Ladakh (Durbuk to the north of Tankse is unmarked)

Durbuk is at a key location between the Indus Valley to the west, the Shyok Valley to the east and the Pangong Lake region to the south. The trade routes to Yarkand (via the Shyok Valley) as well as Rudok (via the Pangong Lake) passed through here. (Note: There were three routes from the Indus Valley to the Shyok Valley, via the Khardung La, the Digar La and the Chang La. Khardung La was most frequently used for the summer route and Chang La, via Durbuk, for the winter route. (Gazetteer of Kashmir and Ladak 1890:563–564))

Durbuk lies in the valley of the Tangtse River, which is described as "well-cultivated" in the British sources. The river is also said to be swarming with fish. Godwin-Austen believed that the valley must have been the bed of a lake at some point in the past.

The Tangtse River originates in the Loi Yogma valley to the southwest of Tangtse, and flows past the Tangtse and Durbuk villages to join the Shyok River. After Durbuk, the river bends sharply to the right and flows in a 400–500 m. gorge for 12 km. At Durbuk, it also receives on the left a small stream that originates below the Chang La.

In historical sources Durbuk is sometimes referred to as "Dumra" (Ldum-ra or Nubra), which is really the name of the Shyok River valley. (Note: For example, "Prince Tshe-dban-rab-brtan fled to Spi-ti, passing through Ldum-ra [Dumra] and Dran-tse [Tangtse]". (Francke, Antiquities of Indian Tibet, Part 2 1926:130); "The Tibetan soldiers pursued the remaining troops as far as a place called Dumra, just one day's journey from Leh, where the Tibetan army pitched their camp." (Shakabpa, One Hundred Thousand Moons 2009:583–584)) It is possible that Durbuk might have been part of the Nubra chieftaincies in the past. Alexander Cunningham includes Durbuk within Nubra.

=== Transportation ===
In the preset time, Durbuk is connected to all parts of Ladakh by road. A southwest road to Karu connects it to the Indus river valley, thence to Leh and Kargil. Another southeast road connects it to the Pangong Tso and Chushul. A northwest road along the western branch of the Shyok River connects it to Diskit and Turtuk.

The 235 km long Darbuk–Shyok–DBO Road in the north, connects it to places on the eastern branch of the Shyok River, including the Shyok village 16 km to the north and further north to Daulat Beg Oldi (DBO) military post on the China border. The stretch between Shyok and DBO is also called Sub-Sector North (SSN) by the Indian Military, and is off-limits to civilians.

== Villages in Durbuk subdivision ==
Villages in Durbuk Subdivision
- Kargyam
- Man Pangong
- Shachukul
- Tangste
- Chushul
- Durbuk

== Demographics ==
According to the 2011 census of India, Durbuk (Note: The Census of India spells the name as Durbok.) has 160 households. The effective literacy rate (i.e. the literacy rate of population excluding children aged 6 and below) is 66.62%.

Demographics (2011 Census)
	Total	Male	Female
Population	852	416	436
Children aged below 6 years	85	40	45
Scheduled caste	0	0	0
Scheduled tribe	846	414	432
Literates	511	298	213
Workers (all)	502	274	228
Main workers (total)	303	200	103
Main workers: Cultivators	134	96	38
Main workers: Agricultural labourers	5	4	1
Main workers: Household industry workers	0	0	0
Main workers: Other	164	100	64
Marginal workers (total)	199	74	125
Marginal workers: Cultivators	165	68	97
Marginal workers: Agricultural labourers	5	0	5
Marginal workers: Household industry workers	2	1	1
Marginal workers: Others	27	5	22
Non-workers	350	142	208

== See also ==
- India-China Border Roads
- Line of Actual Control
- Sino-Indian border dispute
- List of disputed territories of India

== Bibliography ==
- Gazetteer of Kashmir and Ladak, Calcutta: Superintendent of Government Printing, 1890
- Cunningham, Alexander (1854), Ladak: Physical, Statistical, Historical, London: Wm. H. Allen and Co – via archive.org
- Francke, August Hermann (1926). Antiquities of Indian Tibet, Part 2. Calcutta: Government Printing – via archive.org.
- Godwin-Austen, H. H. (1867), "Notes on the Pangong Lake District of Ladakh, from a Journal made during a Survey in 1863", The Journal of the Royal Geographical Society of London, 37, London: J. Murray: 343–363, doi:10.2307/1798534, JSTOR 1798534
- Moorcroft, William; Trebeck, George (2004), Travels in the Himalayan Provinces of Hindustan and the Punjab in Ladakh and Kashmir: In Peshawar, Kabul, Kunduz and Bokhara from 1819 to 1825, Volume 1, London: John Murray, ISBN 978-81-206-0497-1 – via archive.org
- Shakabpa, Tsepon Wangchuk Deden (2009), One Hundred Thousand Moons: An Advanced Political History of Tibet, BRILL, ISBN 978-90-04-17732-1
