= Tarchit =

- Village
- Location in Ladakh, India Tarchit (India)
- Coordinates: 33.449100°N 78.133064°E
- Country: India
- Union Territory: Ladakh
- District: Changthang
- Tehsil: Himya

Population (2011)
  - Total: 167
- Time zone: UTC+5:30 (IST)
- Census code: 888

Tarchit is a village in the Changthang district of the Indian union territory of Ladakh. It is located in the Himya tehsil.

== Demographics ==
According to the 2011 census of India, Tarchit has 32 households. The effective literacy rate (i.e. the literacy rate of population excluding children aged 6 and below) is 62%.

Demographics (2011 Census)
	Total	Male	Female
Population	167	83	84
Children aged below 6 years	17	9	8
Scheduled caste	0	0	0
Scheduled tribe	166	82	84
Literates	93	59	34
Workers (all)	92	43	49
Main workers (total)	84	38	46
Main workers: Cultivators	66	24	42
Main workers: Agricultural labourers	0	0	0
Main workers: Household industry workers	0	0	0
Main workers: Other	18	14	4
Marginal workers (total)	8	5	3
Marginal workers: Cultivators	2	1	1
Marginal workers: Agricultural labourers	0	0	0
Marginal workers: Household industry workers	2	1	1
Marginal workers: Others	4	3	1
Non-workers	75	40	35
