= Skakjung =

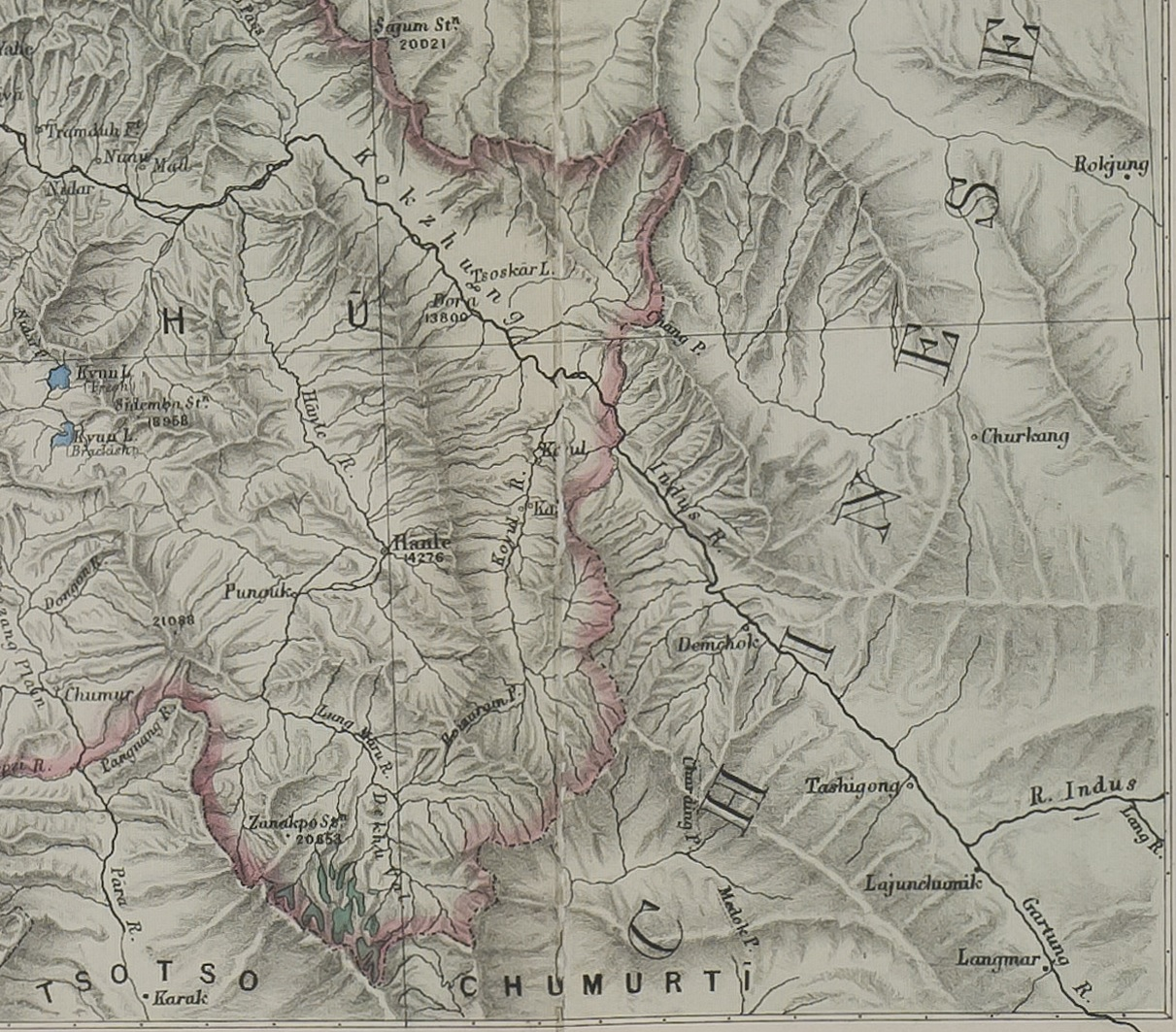
Kokzhung area in a map of Jammu and Kashmir by Frederic Drew, 1875

Skakjung or Kokzhung (Note: Alternative spellings include Kuk-jung, Kag-jung, and Kakjung.) is 45–kilometer long pasture land in Indus River valley in Southern Ladakh. It is traditionally used by nomads of nearby villages such as Chushul and Nyoma as well as Rupshu. The Skakung pasture land can be used year-round because it rarely snows in the Indus Valley. It lies on the right bank of Indus river, between Dumchele in the south and Dungti-Loma Indus river bend in the north.

== Geography ==
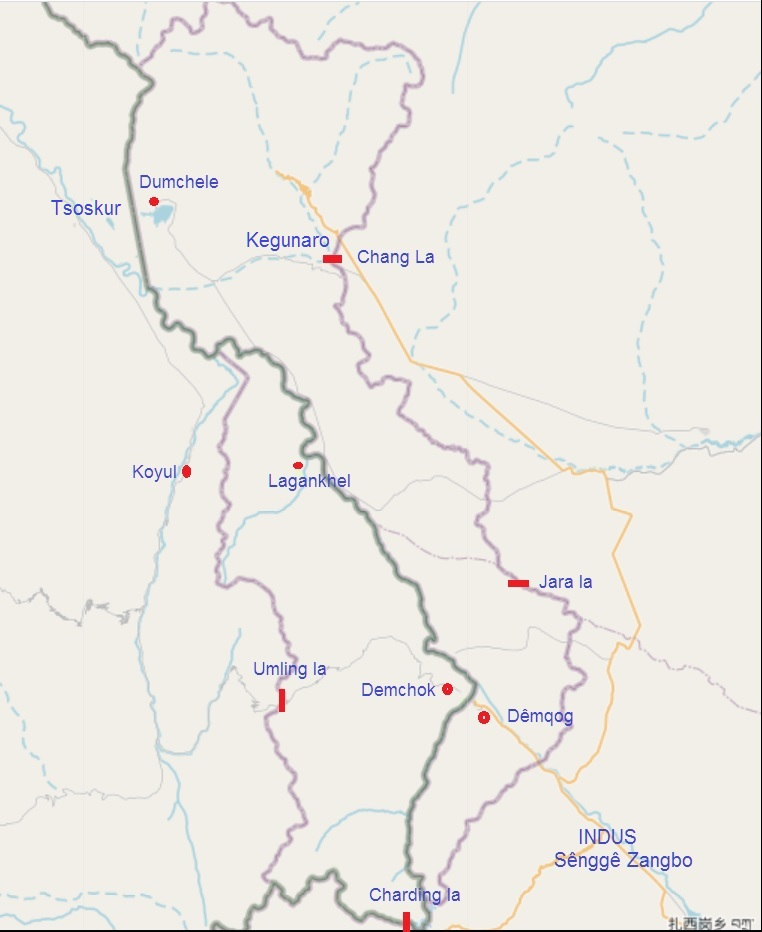
Disputed Demchok sector with the Line of Actual Control in the middle. Skakjung includes the northern part of the sector near Dumchele, Chang La pass, and the Kigunaru River.

The Indus valley in Skakjung is about four miles wide, and sandy with a thin layer of grass. That, coupled with the fact that there is no snow here in winter, makes it a most important winter grazing area for the Changpa nomads.

== India-China border dispute ==
There have been several incursions by the China in this area. India has Patrol Points (PP) 35, 36 & 37 in this area, and China tries to block access to these. Due to the different perception of the border India and China and continuing Chinese incursions in Chushul, Chumur, Dungti, Phobrang, and Demchok has adversely affected the life of local Changpa nomadic herders. In January 2024, the Chinese troops tried to stop and pushed out the local Indian herders who were grazing their livestock in their traditional grazing area. The Indian herders challenged the Chinese petrol in the Tibetan language, "Why have you come here? Why have you brought your vehicles here. This is our ancestral land. We graze our livestock here".

Chushul Councillor Konchok Stanzin said, "Livelihoods of locals have been taken away in the name of buffer zones and patrolling points. Our nomads are struggling for their land". According to Ladakhi Indian diplomat Phunchok Stobdan, Skakjung went from being an Indian-administered area until the mid-1980s to a completely Chinese-administered area by 2008. India's opposition party Congress claims that the Narendra Modi-ruled government of India is covering up "territorial setbacks" in this area, while the ruling government has denied the charges as "politically motivated".

== See also ==
- Demchok sector
- Indo-China Border Roads

== Bibliography ==
- Drew, Frederic (1873), "Alluvial and Lacustrine Deposits and Glacial Records of the Upper-Indus Basin", Quarterly Journal of the Geological Society of London: 441–471
- Drew, Frederic (1875), The Jummoo and Kashmir Territories: A Geographical Account, E. Stanford – via archive.org
- Moorcroft, William; Trebeck, George (1841), Travels in the Himalayan Provinces of Hindustan and the Punjab in Ladakh and Kashmir: In Peshawar, Kabul, Kunduz and Bokhara from 1819 to 1825, Volume 1, London: John Murray, ISBN 978-81-206-0497-1 – via archive.org
