= Mood, Ladakh =

Mudh Mud, Mudh
- Village
- Location in Ladakh, India Mudh (India)
- Coordinates: 33.2045358°N 78.6937618°E
- Country: India
- Union Territory: Ladakh
- District: Changthang
- Tehsil: Nyoma
- Elevation: 4,241 m (13,914 ft)

Population (2011)
  - Total: 675

Languages
  - Official: Ladakhi, Hindi, English
- Time zone: UTC+5:30 (IST)
- PIN: 194404
- 2011 census code: 902

Mood or Mudh is a village in the Changthang district of Ladakh, India. It is located in the Nyoma tehsil.

== Demographics ==
According to the 2011 census of India, Mood has 127 households. The effective literacy rate (i.e. the literacy rate of population excluding children aged 6 and below) is 58.22%.

Demographics (2011 Census)
	Total	Male	Female
Population	675	318	357
Children aged below 6 years	79	32	47
Scheduled caste	0	0	0
Scheduled tribe	675	318	357
Literates	347	206	141
Workers (all)	339	181	158
Main workers (total)	140	93	47
Main workers: Cultivators	32	26	6
Main workers: Agricultural labourers	0	0	0
Main workers: Household industry workers	1	0	1
Main workers: Other	107	67	40
Marginal workers (total)	199	88	111
Marginal workers: Cultivators	195	87	108
Marginal workers: Agricultural labourers	0	0	0
Marginal workers: Household industry workers	1	0	1
Marginal workers: Others	3	1	2
Non-workers	336	137	199
