= Changthang district =

District in Ladakh, India

- District of Ladakh
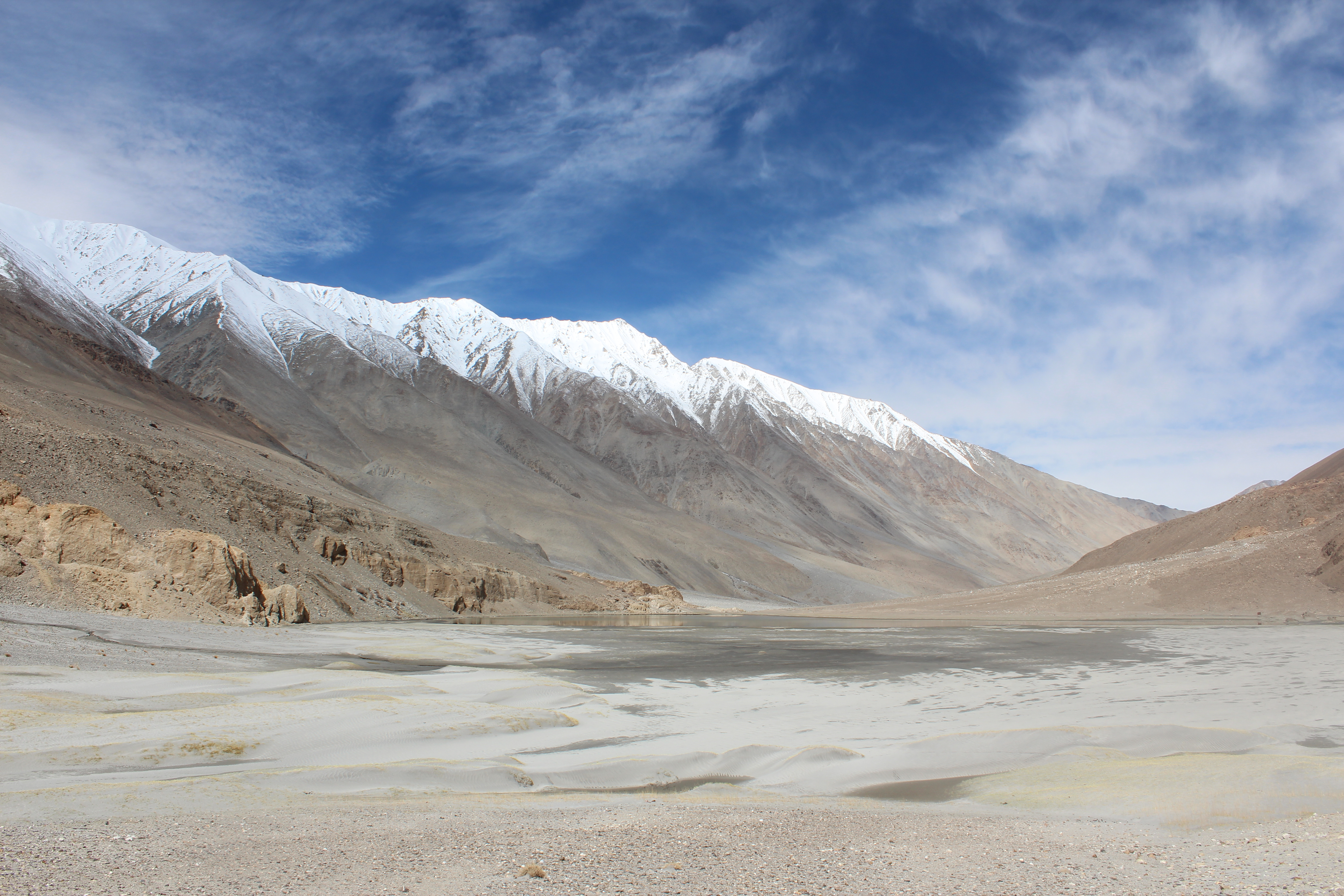
- View of Changthang Cold Desert Wildlife Sanctuary
- Interactive map of Changthang district
- Coordinates: 33°12′21″N 78°38′54″E
- Country: India
- Union Territory: Ladakh
- Headquarter: Nyoma
- Established: 27 April 2026

Government
  - Deputy Commissioner: Sh. Nitish Rajoria IAS
  - Lok Sabha constituencies: Ladakh
  - MP: Mohmad Haneefa

Area
  - Total: 10,610 km^{2} (4,100 sq mi)

Population (2011)
  - Total: 13,000

Languages
  - Official: Hindi, English, Ladakhi, Urdu and Purgi
  - Spoken: Shina, Balti, Tibetan
- Time zone: UTC+05:30 (IST)

Changthang district is one of the districts in the Union Territory of Ladakh in India. The town of Nyoma is its administrative headquarters.

== History ==
Earlier announced on 26th August 2024 as a new district was awaiting the formal notification for the creation. On 27th April 2026, 5 new districts were notified in the government gazette for boosting the service delivery and infrastructure, including Changthang with 24 revenue villages.

== Geography ==
Changthang district is part of the larger Changtang region (alternatively spelled Changthang or Qangtang) in the high altitude Tibetan Plateau. Changtang region is spread across the western and northern Tibet extending into the southern edges of Xinjiang as well as Changthang district in southeastern Ladakh of in India.

Changthang, also known as Eastern Flat Land, is the region where nomads reside, situated to the east of Leh near the Chinese border. The typical elevation of the region hovers at approximately 4,450 m (14,600 ft) above sea level.

== Administration ==
The Changthang district includes Nyoma and Durbuk subdivisions. The Demchok, Hanle, Ukdungle, Chushul, Tangtse, and Chumar sector are important habitations.

Sub–divisions, Blocks and Villages in Changthang district
Current district	Sub-Division	Tehsil	Blocks	Villages
Changthang district	Nyoma	Nyoma	Nyoma	Mudh, Nyoma, Karzok, Samadrokchan, Kharnak
Changthang district	Nyoma	Anlay	Anlay	Anlay, Demjok, Koyul
Changthang district	Nyoma	Chumathang	Chumathang	Chumathang, kariy/Kairay, Skitmang
Changthang district	Nyoma	Himya	Himya	Hemya, Teri, Kungaym, Tarchit, Liktse, Tukla
Changthang district	Durbuk	Tangtse	Durbuk	Chushul, Durbuk, Kargyam, Man Pangong, Shachukul, Tangtse, Phulaks
Total	2	5	5	24

== Demographics ==
Based on aggregation of the village-level data from the 2011 Census of India for the areas constituting the present district, Changthang had an estimated population of about 13,000. The district is extremely sparsely populated, with a population density of fewer than 1 person per square kilometre, and is inhabited predominantly by the nomadic and semi-nomadic Changpa communities.

== Politics ==
=== Parliamentary Constituency ===
The district falls under Ladakh Lok Sabha constituency. The present Member of Parliament (MP) of Ladakh is Mohmad Haneefa (independent candidate).

=== Autonomous Hill Council ===
Changthang District is administered by an elected body known as the Ladakh Autonomous Hill Development Council, Changthang. The LAHDC was established in 2026.

== Tourism ==
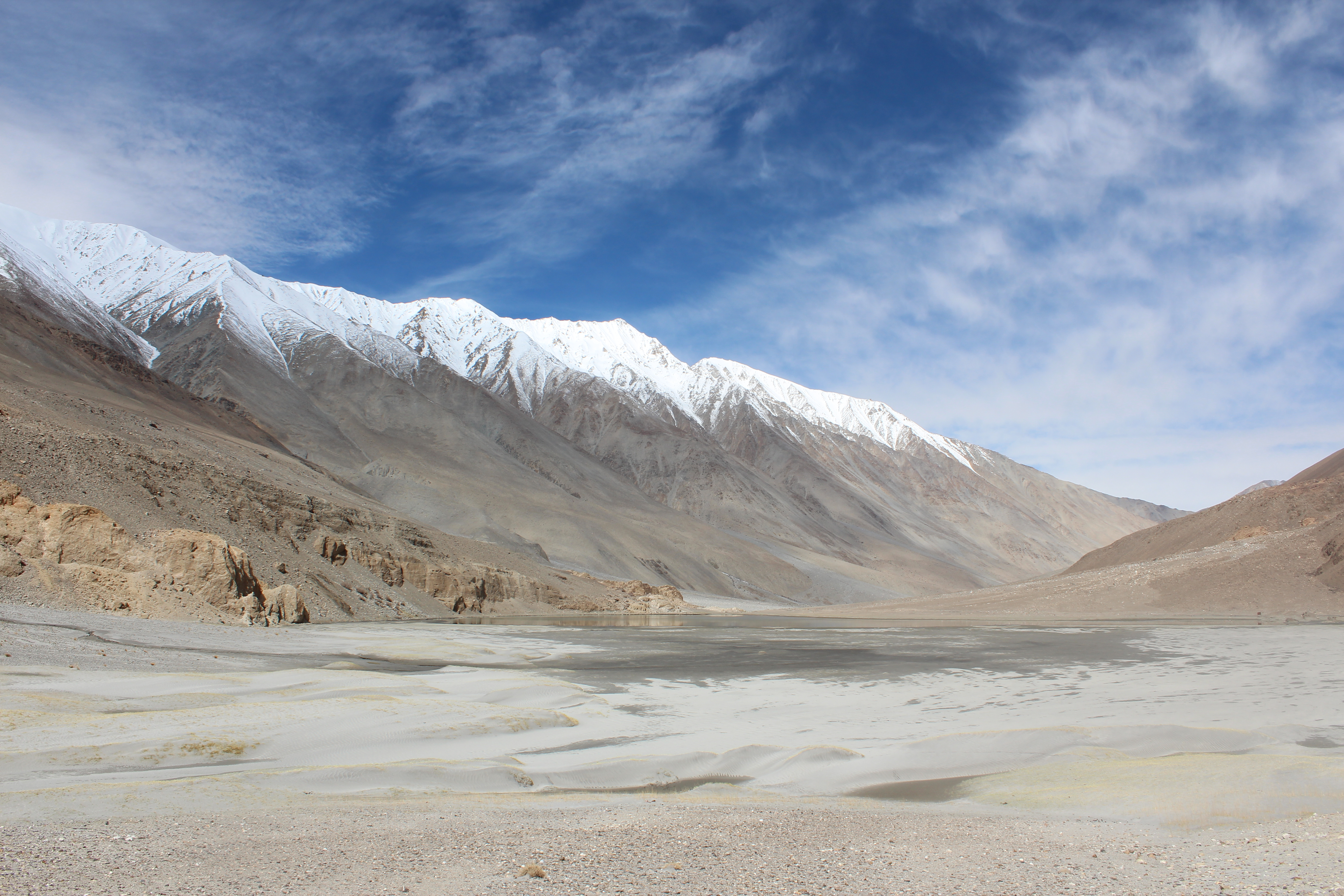
Changthang Wildlife Sanctuary in Changthang.

=== Cultural tourism ===
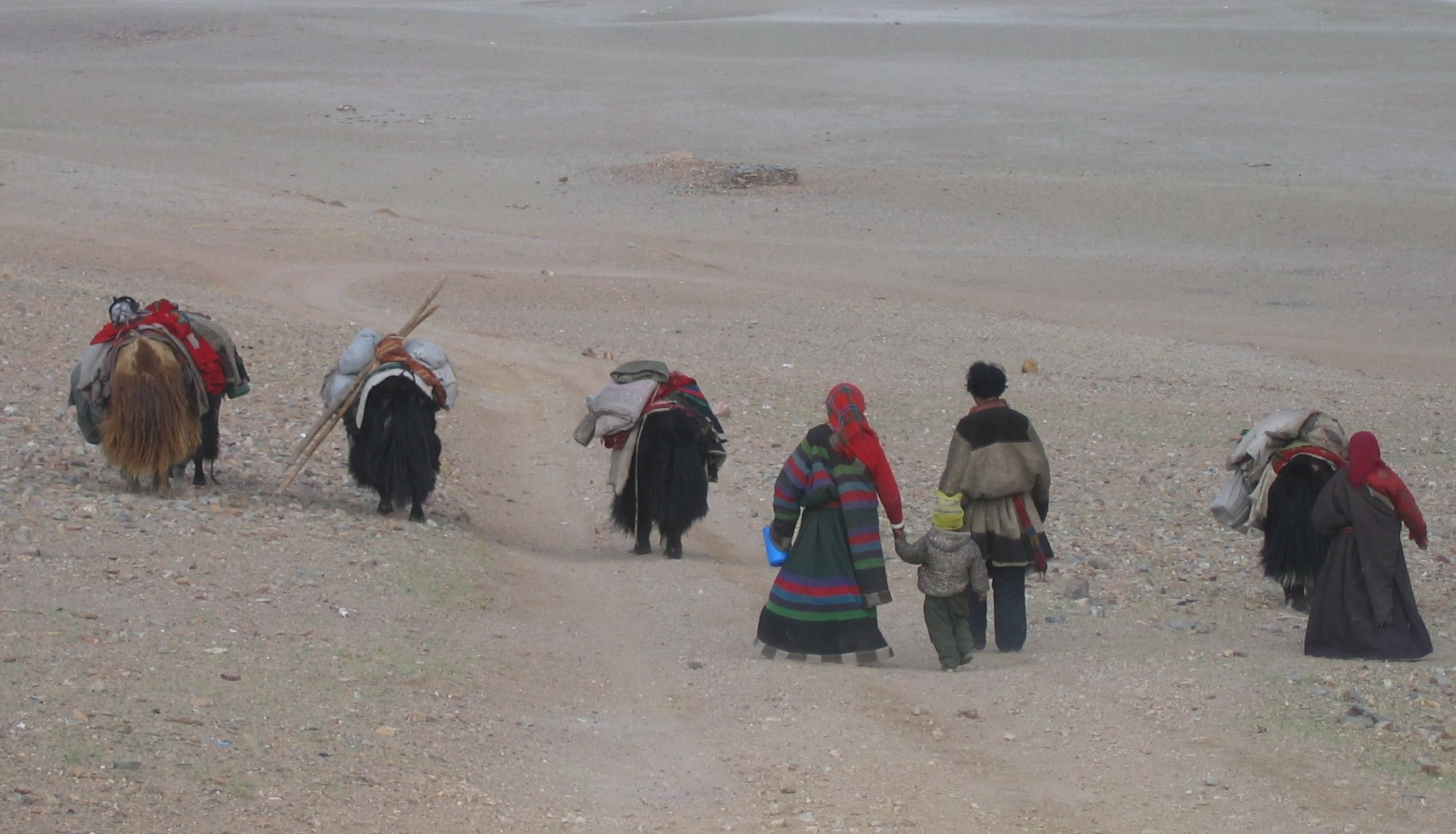
Changpa nomadic people of Changthang.

The most remarkable characteristic of this Lake region is the Nomadic people who herd goats and yaks. The Changtang is home to the Changpa, a nomadic pastoralist people.

=== Religious tourism ===
The 19th-century Korzok Monastery of Tibetan Buddhism, contains statues of Shakyamuni Buddha and other deities.

=== Eco tourism ===
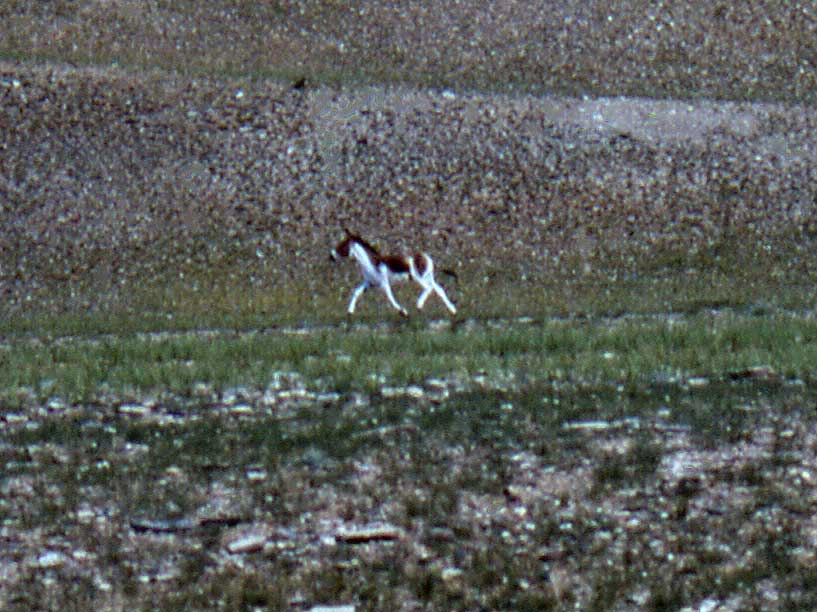
Wild kiang near Tso Kar Lake.

Changthang Wildlife Sanctuary, wild animals, lakes, and rare birds are the primary draw of this region.

=== Kailash range ===
Kailash Range lakes are Pangong Tso and Spanggur Tso.

==== Pangong lake ====
Pangong Lake stretches for 40 miles and is approximately 2 to 4 miles wide, situated at an elevation of 4,267 m (13,999 ft) above sea level. India occupies one-third of the lake, with the rest falling under China's territory. The lake's most notable feature is its water color, which is a vibrant deep blue in the evening and becomes light blue in the morning, catching the eye at first sight. The lake water is not as salty as ocean water, but it is as cold as ice.

==== Spanggur Tso ====
Spanggur Tso lies adjacent to Pangong Lake.

=== Rupsho valley ===
Rupshu area has several soda lakes inside the Salt Valley, which are also recognised as Ramsar site.

- More plains pool
  - Tso Kar
  - Startsapuk Tso
- Salt Valley
  - Kyago Tso (Kyagar Tso)
  - Tso Moriri
- Other lakes in Changthang
  - Chilling Tso
  - Ryul Tso

==== Tso Moriri lake ====
Located in the Rupshu|Rupshu Valley, the Tso Moriri lake is a stunning body of water surrounded by mountains and situated approximately 240 kilometers from Leh. The Lake sits at an altitude of 14,000 ft close to the tiny village of Karzok.

==== Tso Kar ====
Tso Kar (also known as the salt lake), another gorgeous Lake, is situated approximately 76 kilometers away from Tso Moriri. Tso Kar Lake, also referred to as the 'White Lake,' is located in the Rupshu Plateau and valley in the southern region of Ladakh. Wetlands and lush green meadows are all around it. The water in the lake is slightly salty. There are wide range of birds. A significant quantity of grebes and brown-headed gulls, as well as a few strip geese, rust geese, and terns, can be observed. Tso Kar Lake supports various other animals like Kiang, Tibetan gazelles, Tibetan wolves. The tent-dwelling Samad-Rokchen nomadic group resides around the lake. Thugjay village serves as the central hub of this nomadic community.

=== Scientific tourism ===
==== Hanle observatory ====
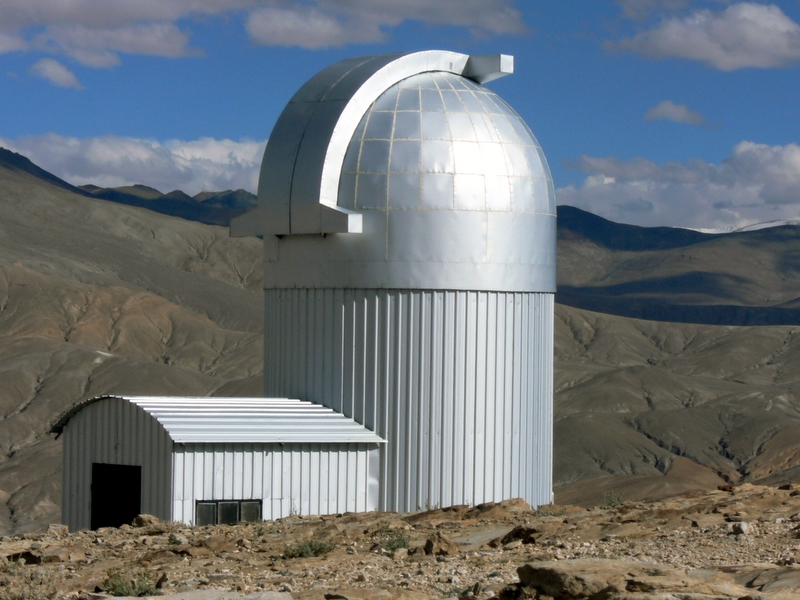
Indian Astronomical Observatory at Hanle.

Indian Astronomical Observatory (IAO), a high-altitude astronomy station in Hanle in Western Himalayas, is operated by the Indian Institute of Astrophysics at an elevation of 4,500 metres (14,800 ft) as world's tenth-highest optical telescope sites for optical, infrared, and gamma-ray telescopes.

==== ISRO space station ====
ISRO's Human Outer Planet Exploration (HOPE) station at Tso Kar for India’s human space exploration mimics conditions on the Moon and Mars and aimed at carrying out "research for future crewed interplanetary journeys", and acts as testing grounds for relevant technologies, help advance technology readiness levels (TRL) and engineering integration, and facilitate human studies, crew training and research around geological, geomorphological, habitability, and life detection. There are 33 such stations across the world. In August 2025, India began its first ever space simulation at this station in which 2 crew in space suit stayed inside the station for the further research and development.

== Climate ==
The summers are warm but short and thunderstorms can occur at any time of year, often accompanied with hail. Meanwhile, the winters are cold and Arctic-like despite the latitude, primarily due to the high elevation.

== Transport ==
Nyoma Airstrip and Fukche Airstrip in the east are two military airstrips in the district.

Hanle-Kaza-Tabo Road is being constructed by the BRO under the Indo-China Border Roads (ICBR) scheme. This road connects to and partially overlaps with the 125 km long Kiato-Karzok Road, from Kiato (near Kaza in Spiti Valley in Himachal Pradesh) through the Takling La Tunnel (5575 m) to Karzok (on shores of Tso Moriri), being constructed by the BRO as fourth alternative route to Ladakh.

Hanle-Zursar-Imis La Road was completed by December 2023.

== See also ==
- List of districts of Ladakh
- Geography of Ladakh
- Tourism in Ladakh
