= Kargyam =

Kargyam kar(white) and gyan(ornament)
- Village cluster
- Location of Kargyam Sato in Ladakh, India Kargyam (India)
- Coordinates: 33.8731°N 78.2910°E
- Country: India
- Union Territory: Ladakh
- District: Changthang
- Tehsil: Tangtse

Population (2011)
  - Total: 564
- Time zone: UTC+5:30 (IST)
- Census code: 907

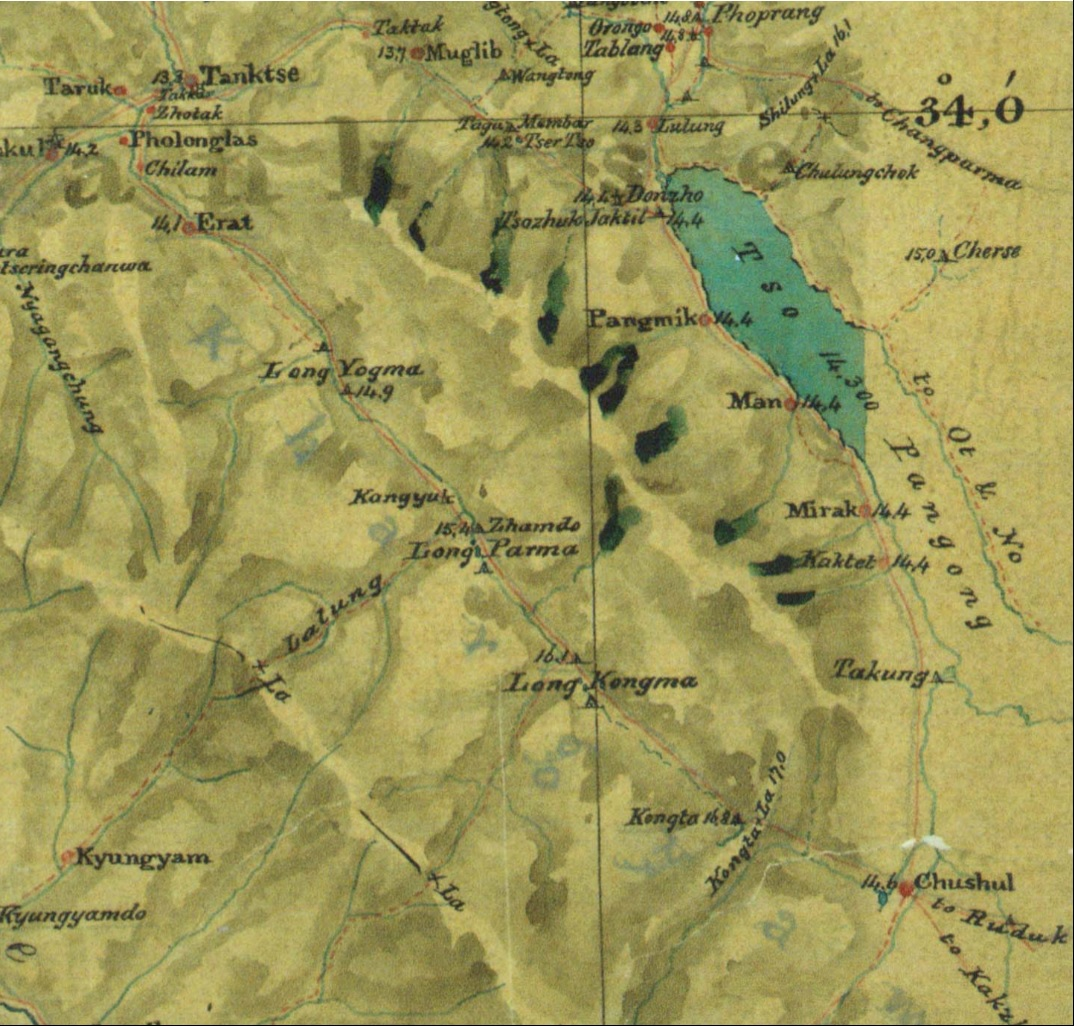
Map showing the Long valley between Tangtse and Chushul (Strachey, 1851)

Kargyam is a village in Changthang district of the Indian union territory of Ladakh. It is located in the Tangtse tehsil (subdistrict), in the Long Parma valley between Tangtse and Chushul. Kargyam is famous for its wetlands and Blackneck crane and nomadic lifestyle.

The name "Kargyam" is derived from two words: "Kar", which means white, and "Gyan", which means ornament. The village is so named because it is often blanketed in white snow, resembling a beautiful white ornament.

Kargyam comprises four smaller villages, namely:

- Chibra
- Satoo
- Kherapulu
- Barma

== Demographics ==
According to the 2011 census of India, Kargyam has 106 households. The effective literacy rate (i.e. the literacy rate of population excluding children aged 6 and below) is 59.12%.

Demographics (2011 Census)
| | Total | Male | Female |
|---|---|---|---|
| Population | 564 | 279 | 285 |
| Children aged below 6 years | 87 | 42 | 45 |
| Scheduled caste | 0 | 0 | 0 |
| Scheduled tribe | 468 | 232 | 236 |
| Literates | 282 | 169 | 113 |
| Workers (all) | 294 | 142 | 152 |
| Main workers (total) | 213 | 121 | 92 |
| Main workers: Cultivators | 30 | 15 | 15 |
| Main workers: Agricultural labourers | 11 | 6 | 5 |
| Main workers: Household industry workers | 1 | 0 | 1 |
| Main workers: Other | 171 | 100 | 71 |
| Marginal workers (total) | 81 | 21 | 60 |
| Marginal workers: Cultivators | 2 | 0 | 2 |
| Marginal workers: Agricultural labourers | 0 | 0 | 0 |
| Marginal workers: Household industry workers | 0 | 0 | 0 |
| Marginal workers: Others | 79 | 21 | 58 |
| Non-workers | 270 | 137 | 133 |
