= Chang La =

Mountain pass in Ladakh, India

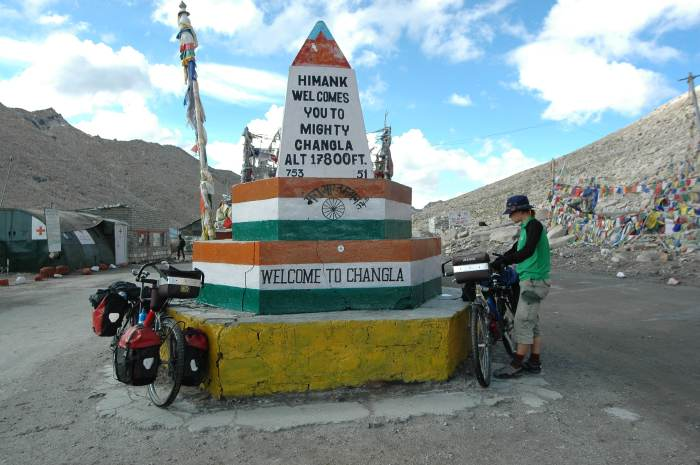

- Location within Ladakh Location within India
- Elevation: 5,360 metres (17,590 ft)
- Traversed by: Road from Indus Valley to Pangong Lake

Third Approach
- Location: Ladakh, India
- Range: Himalayas
- Coordinates: 34°02′49″N 77°55′50″E

Chang La is a high mountain pass in Ladakh at an elevation of 5,360 m (17,590 ft) in the Greater Himalaya between Leh and the Shyok River valley. The Chang La, on Leh to Pangong Lake road, lies on the Leh-Karu-Sakti-Zingral-Chang La-Durbuk-Tangtse-Pangong Lake motorable road. Karu, which lies on Leh-Manali NH-3, connects Chang La and Pangong Lake to Leh and the rest of India. In September 2021, BRO opened another alternate motorable asphalt road between Zingral and Tangtse via Ke La pass (5,669.28 m or 18,600.0 ft) and Taruk (also spelled Tharuk).

Chang La is approached from Zingral village by a steeply climbing asphalt road which requires careful driving. The stretch of 10–15 km road on either side of Chang La becomes loose dirt and slush after the winter and requires regular maintenance. During the summer months specifically the tourist season, small streams appear across the road, making the climb a challenge for bikers. The descent from Chang La towards Tangtse or Darbuk is again very steep. Doctors advise not staying at the top for more than 20–25 minutes as it may cause altitude sickness.

== Etymology ==
Chang La literally means "Southern Pass" ("Chang" = South, "La" = Pass) in the Tibetic language of Ladakhi.

== Geography ==
The Changla pass is the main gateway for the Nubra region. The small town of Tangste is one of the nearest settlements. Zingral is the nearest habitation.

== DRDO research station ==
The world's highest research station, established by the Defence Research and Development Organisation is functional at Chang La situated at the height of 5,384 metres (17,664 ft).

== Gallery ==
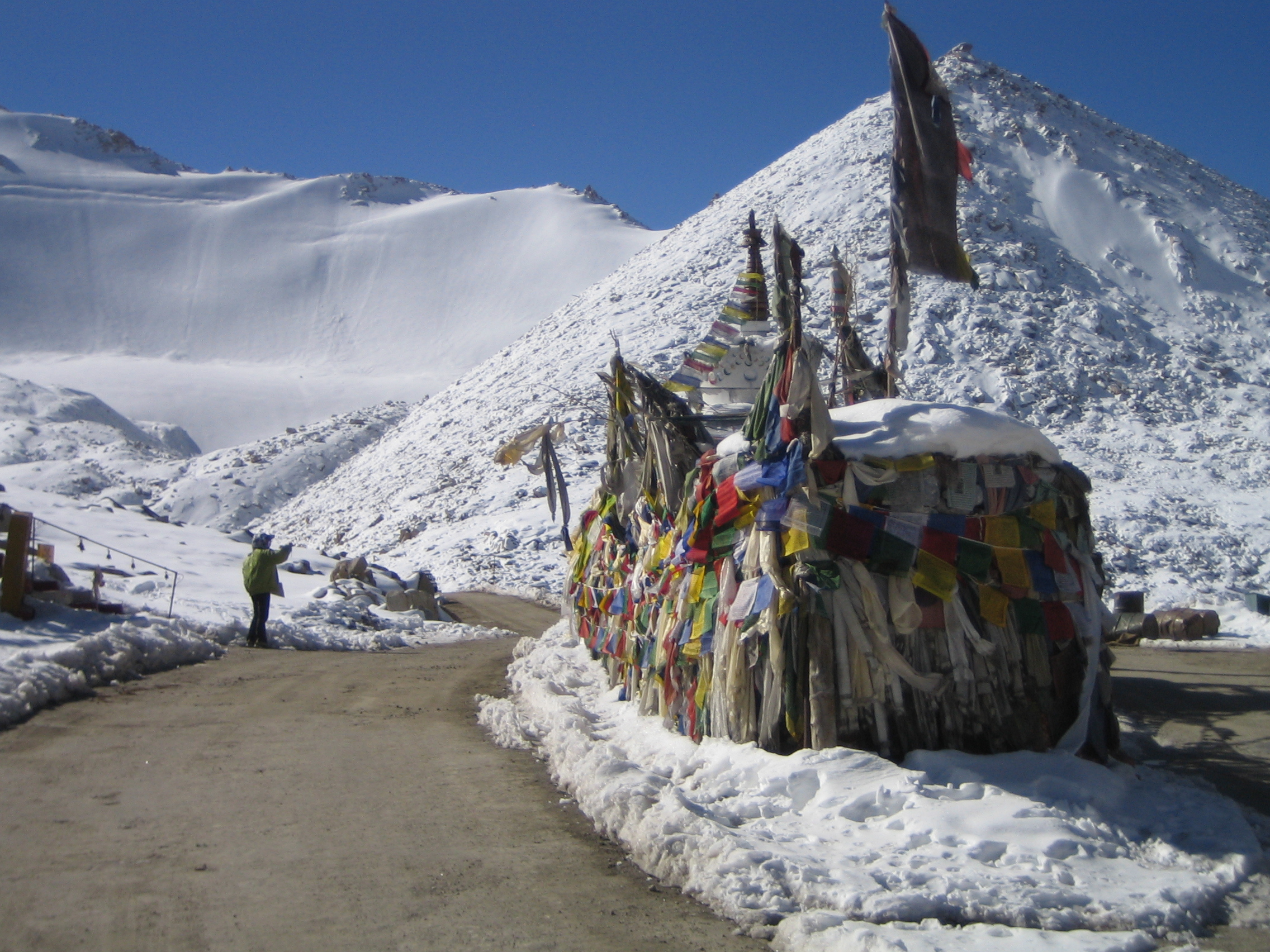
Chang La with prayer flags

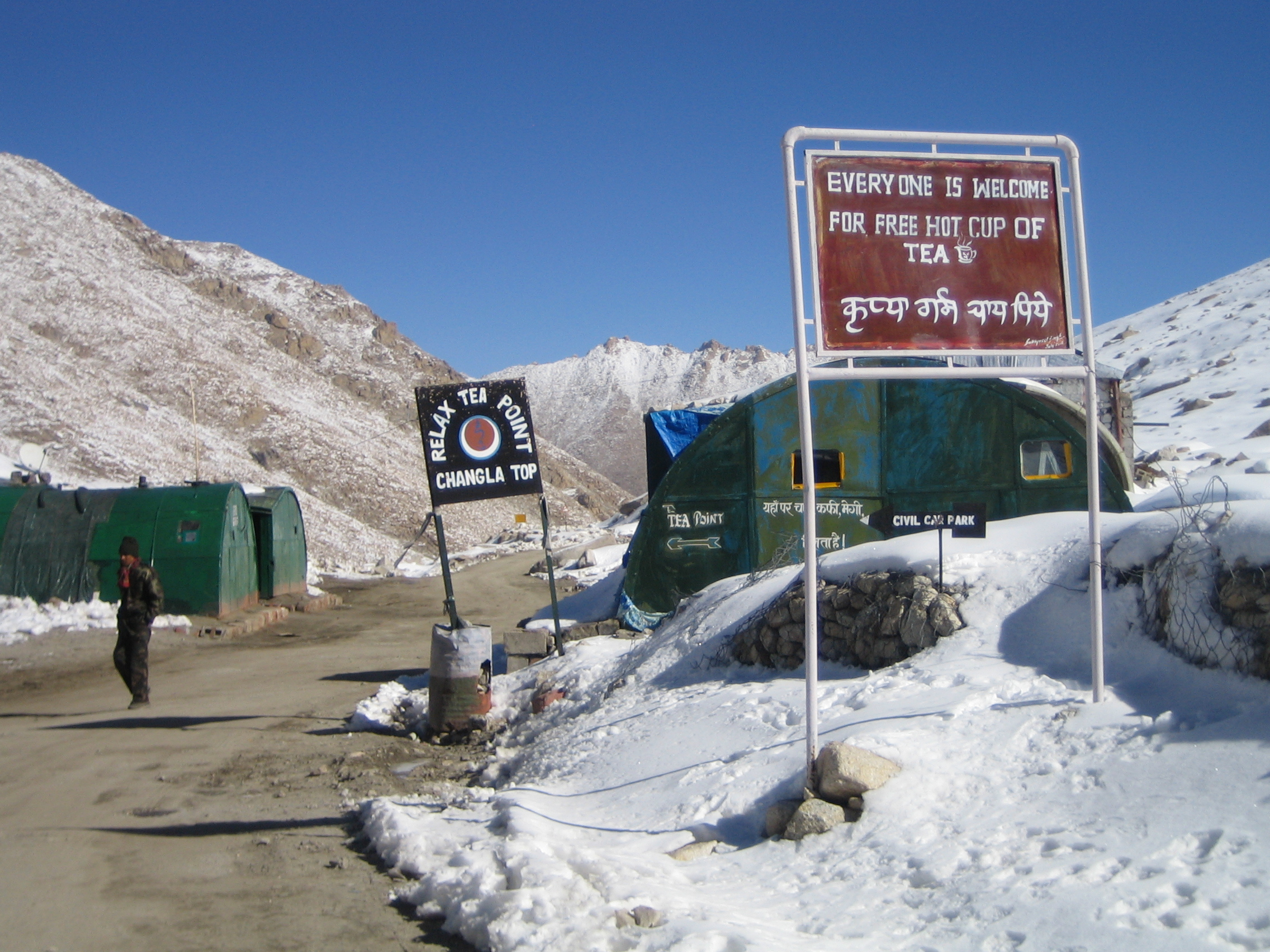
Chang La, Tea Point, everyone is welcome

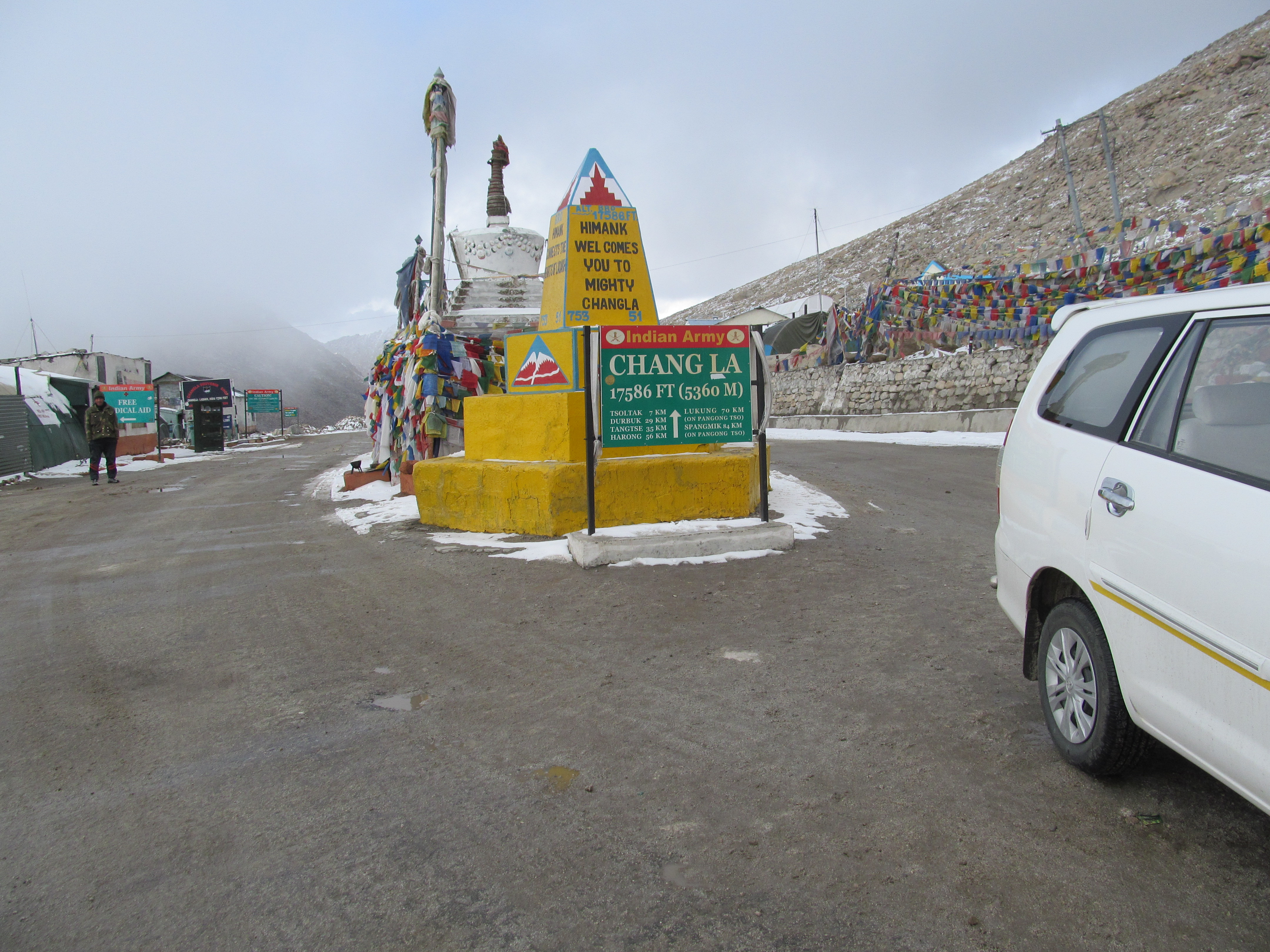
Chang La, Ladakh in 2013

== See also ==
- India-China Border Roads
- Transport and tourism in Ladakh
- List of mountain passes of India
- List of mountains in India
