= Nyoma =

Nyoma Nyama Neoma
- Town
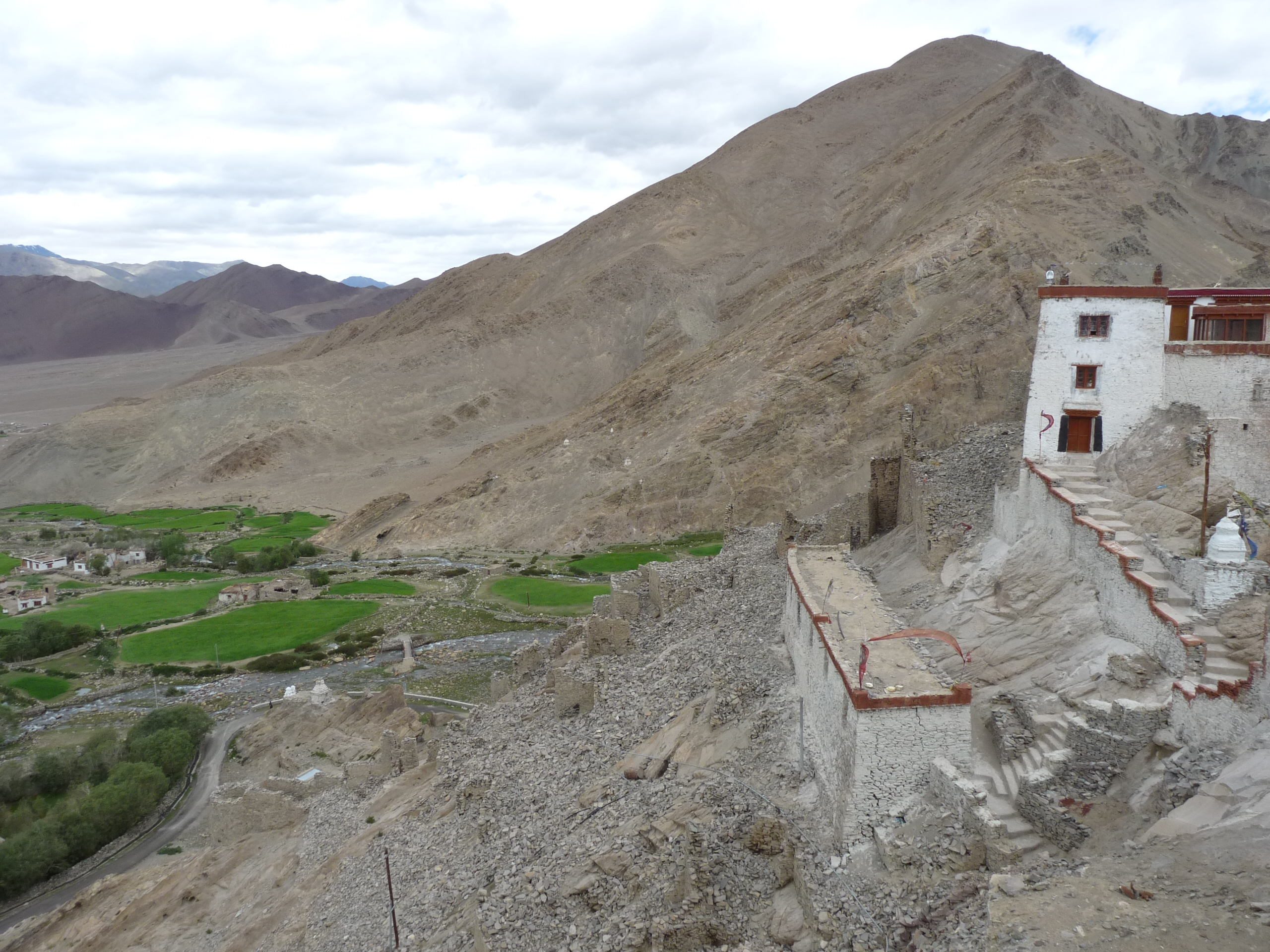
- Nyoma's setting as seen from the gompa (Buddhist monastery)

- Location in Ladakh Nyoma (India)
- Coordinates: 33.2059163°N 78.6483843°E
- Country: India
- Union territory: Ladakh
- District: Changthang
- Tehsil: Nyoma

Government
  - Type: Autonomous Hill Development Council
  - Body: LAHDC, Changthang
- Elevation: 4,180 m (13,710 ft)

Population (2011)
  - Total: 918

Languages
  - Official: Lhadakhi, Hindi, English
- Time zone: UTC+5:30 (IST)
- PIN: 194404
- 2011 census code: 901

Nyoma (Alternative spelling include "Nyama", and "Neoma") (Note: The village was referred to as "Nimu" or "Nima" during the British Raj period.) town, the headquarters of Changthang district. and an eponymous subdivision, tehsil, community development block and Indian Air Force Base in Ladakh in India. It is located on the bank of the Indus river after its 90-degree bend near Dungti east of Nyoma and before the valley narrows to a gorge near Mahe northwest of Nyoma. The Nyoma tehsil and subdivision cover all of southern Ladakh, including the Rupshu plains south of Nyoma, the Indus valley of Skakjung north of Nyoma, and the Hanle valley. Nyoma gompa, a Buddhist monastery, is located on the hill slope north of the village.

== Geography ==
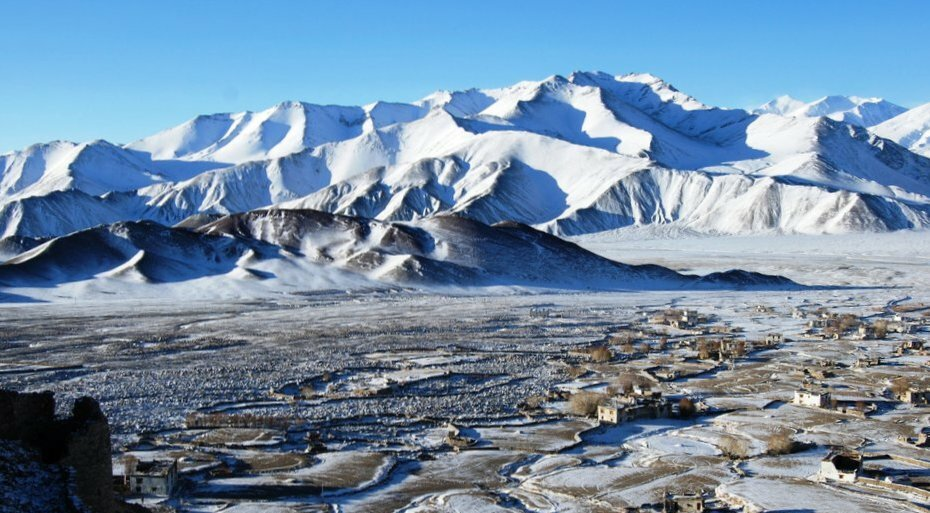
Nyoma

The Indus river after its entry into Ladakh flows in a southwesterly direction after Demchok through (past Skakjung pastureland on its right bank) a wide valley. Afterwards, at the northwestern end of Skakjung pastureland, it takes a 90-degree bend at Dungti blocked by the higher ground of the Chushul valley in the north. The village of Nyoma lies 33 km west of the bend on the right bank (northern bank), where it is also coupled with another neighbouring village Mood (or Mud or Mad). The Indus river here is said to be wide and shallow. It could be easily forded.

Nyoma is located 41 km southeast of Chumathang, and 87 km south of Chushul. Nearby villages are Mahe and Loma. Hanle, the largest village in southern Ladakh, is 80 km to the southeast. Mount Sajum on the border with China is 43 km to the east.

Nyoma tehsil borders the Tibet Autonomous Region of China on the south and the east. The southern border runs along the Chumar village in Rupshu and the Imis Pass at the end of the Hanle valley. The eastern border, a Line of Actual Control resulting from the 1962 war with China, runs along the Kailash Range watershed of the Indus river till the village of Dumchele and narrows to the right bank of the Indus river up to Demchok.

The road from Leh runs till the village of Koyul, crossing the Indus river at Loma. From Koyul to Demchok, there is only a rough track. An alternative border road runs between the Koyul Lungpa valley and Demchok via the Umling La pass.

== Military facilities ==
=== Nyoma Airbase ===
Nyoma hosts an Air Force Station at Mudh. The airbase is only 23 km (14 mi) away from the Line of Actual Control. The airfield was originally established during 1962 India-China War. However, the unused airstrip was started serving as an advanced landing ground (ALG) to support fixed-wing aircraft operations from 18 September 2009.

The airstrip was upgraded to a full-fledged air base between August 2023 to November 2025 under Project Himank with a budget of ₹218 crore (equivalent to ₹232 crore or US$24 million in 2026) by the Border Roads Organisation (BRO).

The upgrade expanded the airstrip to a 1,235 acre an airbase capable of supporting fighter jet operations at 13,700 feet (4,200 m) elevation with an expanded 2.7 km (8,900 ft)-long, 46 m (151 ft)-wide runway paved runway along with allied military infrastructure. The supporting infrastructure included ATC complex, hangar, crash bay, watch towers, and accommodation facilities.

The Mudh-Nyoma Air Base was formerly inaugurated by the Chief of the Air Staff, Air Chief Marshal Amar Preet Singh, on 12 November 2025.

=== Field Firing Range ===
Nearby Nyoma is Indian Military's "Mahe Field Firing Range" (MFFR) on 1,259.25 ha (12.5925 km^{2}) land inside the Changthang Wildlife Sanctuary. Firing range is 40–50 km (25–31 mi) from the disputed India-China Line of Actual Control. This is the one of its kind firing range in the entire Indian-held Ladakh region where all types of weapons can be fired.

=== Tara Training Node Area ===
A 48.6 ha (486,000 m^{2}) Training Node Area at Tara in the Changthang Wildlife Sanctuary will be constructed.

== Infrastructure ==
=== Roads ===
Roads infrastructure this area is being enhanced under the India-China Border Roads projects.

=== Telecommunication ===
Wildlife clearance was granted in 2022 for laying optical fiber cables in the Changthang Wildlife Sanctuary and Karakoram Wildlife Sanctuary for the internet and telephony connectivity.

=== Tourism ===
Since 2010, foreign tourists with Inner Line Permits are permitted to visit Nyoma and its monastery.

== Administration ==
=== Changthang district ===
When Changyhang district was notified in 2026, Nyoma became its headquarter.

=== Nyoma subdivision ===
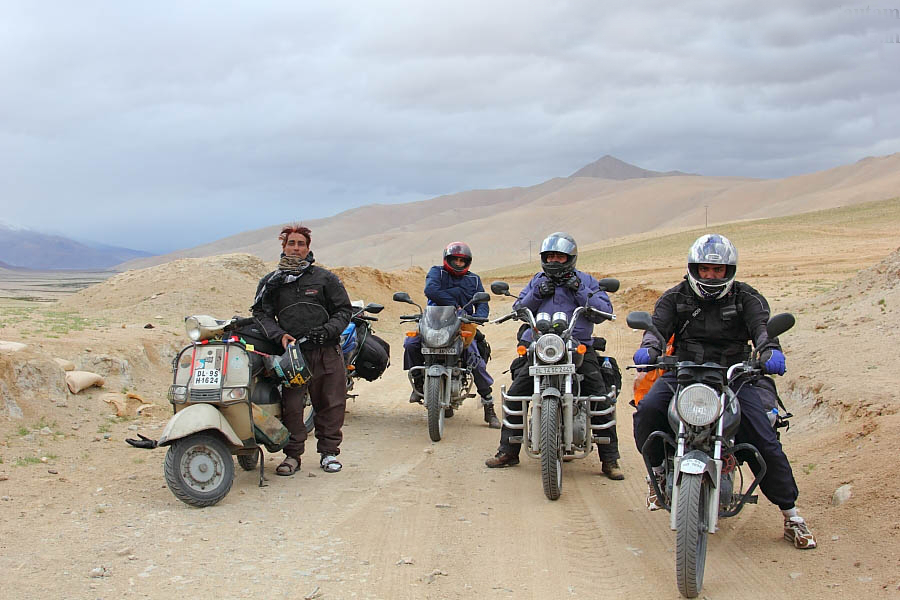
Tsaga La pass.

The permanent civilian habitations under the administration of the Nyoma community development block (district subdivision) include villages like Nyoma, Hanle, Koyul, Demchok, Tsaga, Mudh, Rongo, Nyedar, etc.

=== Nyoma village ===
According to the 2011 census of India, Nyoma has 202 households. The effective literacy rate (i.e. the literacy rate of population excluding children aged 6 and below) is 49.94%.

Demographics (2011 census)
	Total	Male	Female
Population	918	427	491
Children aged below 6 years	125	63	62
Scheduled caste	2	0	2
Scheduled tribe	707	329	378
Literates	396	198	198
Workers (all)	345	212	133
Main workers (total)	160	100	60
Main workers: Cultivators	40	28	12
Main workers: Agricultural labourers	6	1	5
Main workers: Household industry workers	5	4	1
Main workers: Other	109	67	42
Marginal workers (total)	185	112	73
Marginal workers: Cultivators	13	9	4
Marginal workers: Agricultural labourers	119	68	51
Marginal workers: Household industry workers	4	0	4
Marginal workers: Others	49	35	14
Non-workers	573	215	358

== See also ==
- India-China Border Roads
- Line of Actual Control
- List of disputed territories of India

== Bibliography ==
- Gazetteer of Kashmir and Ladak, Calcutta: Superintendent of Government Printing, 1890
- Drew, Frederic (1875), The Jummoo and Kashmir Territories: A Geographical Account, E. Stanford – via archive.org
