= Tangtse =

Settlement in Ladakh, India

Tangtse Drangtse
- Village and Tehsil
- Location in Ladakh, India Tangtse (India)
- Coordinates: 34.0301500°N 78.1677300°E
- Country: India
- Union Territory: Ladakh
- District: Changthang
- Tehsil: Tangtse

Government
  - Councillor: Tashi Namgyal Yakzee

Population (2011)
  - Total: 681
- Time zone: UTC+5:30 (IST)
- Census code: 874

Tangtse or Drangtse (Note: Alternative spellings include Tanktse, Tankse, Tangtsi, Tagste, Trangste, and Thang-rtse. Spelling closer to the Tibetan transliteration have also been used: Bran-rtse and Btang-rtse.) (Tibetan: བྲང་རྩེ, Wylie: brang rtse, THL: drang tsé) is a village and one of the tehsil in the Changthang district of Ladakh, India. Traditionally, it was regarded as the border between the Nubra region to the north and the Pangong region to the south. It was a key halting place on the trade route between Turkestan and Tibet. (Note: The Government of the People's Republic of China has claimed that there was a trade route through the Aksai Chin plateau, which is found to be historically inaccurate.) It was also a site of wars between Ladakh and Tibet.

During the Jammu and Kashmir princely rule, Tangtse was the headquarters of an ilaqa (subdistrict), whose territory included the Pangong Lake area, the Chang Chenmo Valley and the Aksai Chin plateau. Tangtse was also a key halting place on the Chang Chenmo route to Turkestan, via the Chang Chenmo Valley and Aksai Chin, which the British tried to promote for a few decades.

Tangtse is one of the 26 constituencies of the Ladakh Autonomous Hill Development Council of the Leh district. Following the 2020 election, the Councillor for Tangste is Tashi Namgyal Yakzee, who is also in the Executive Council.

== Geography ==
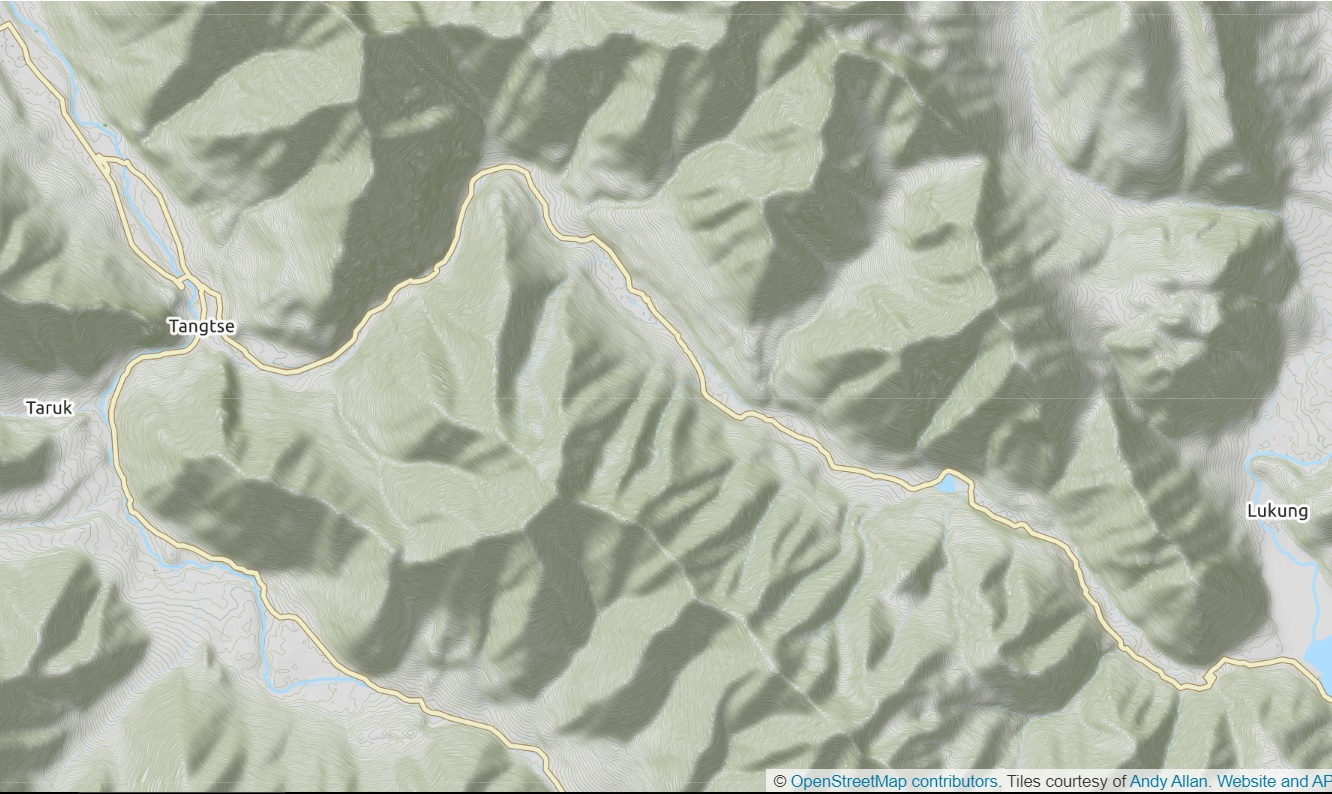
Topographic map of the Tangtse area, showing the Tangtse fault and the Pangong fault; the edge of the Pangong Lake can be seen at the bottom right

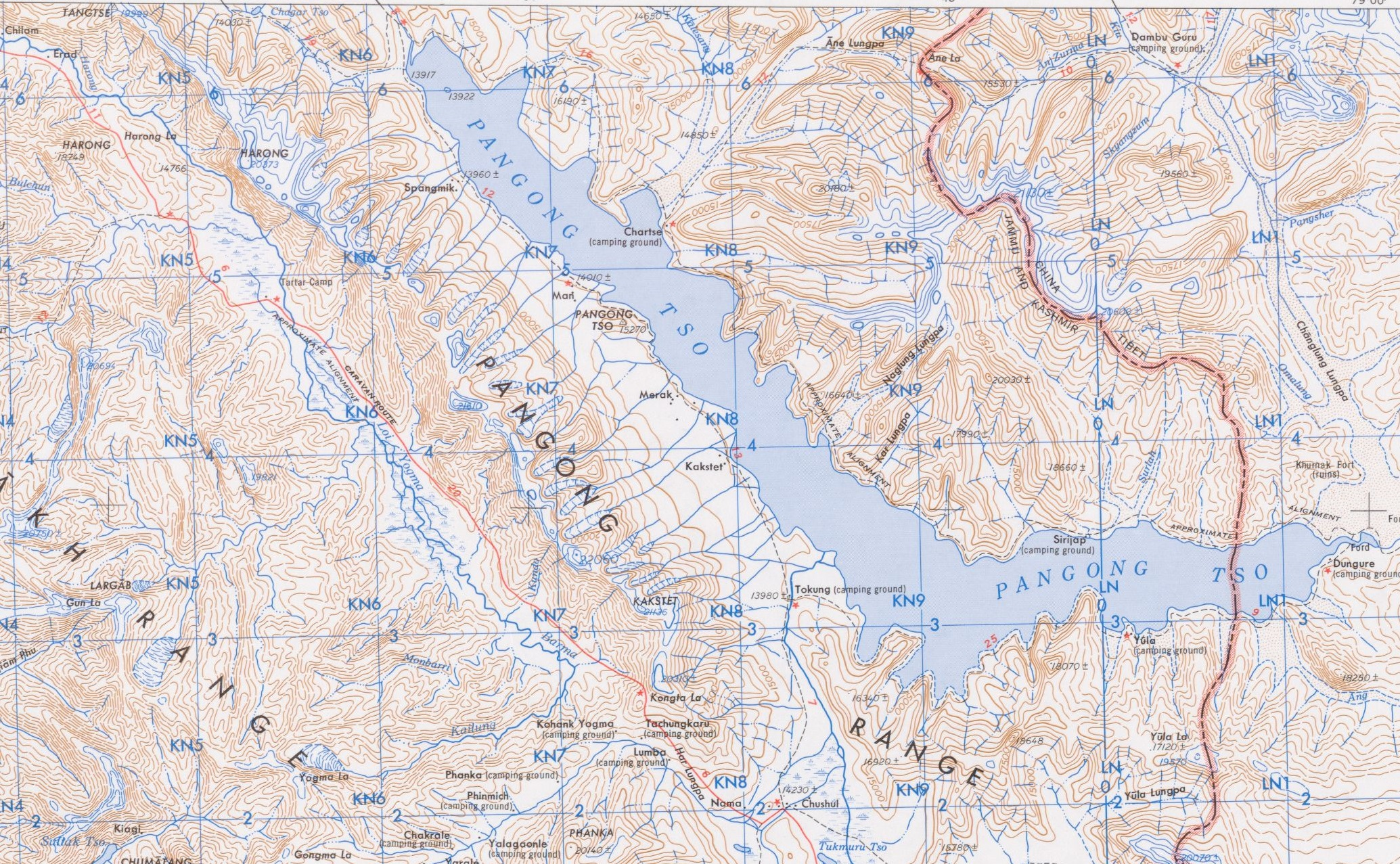
The Topographic map of the area shows the Tangtse fault (Loi Yogma valley), the Pangong Range and the Pangong Lake. The Tangtse area is at the norwestern corner of the map, with the village itself being further north (not shown)

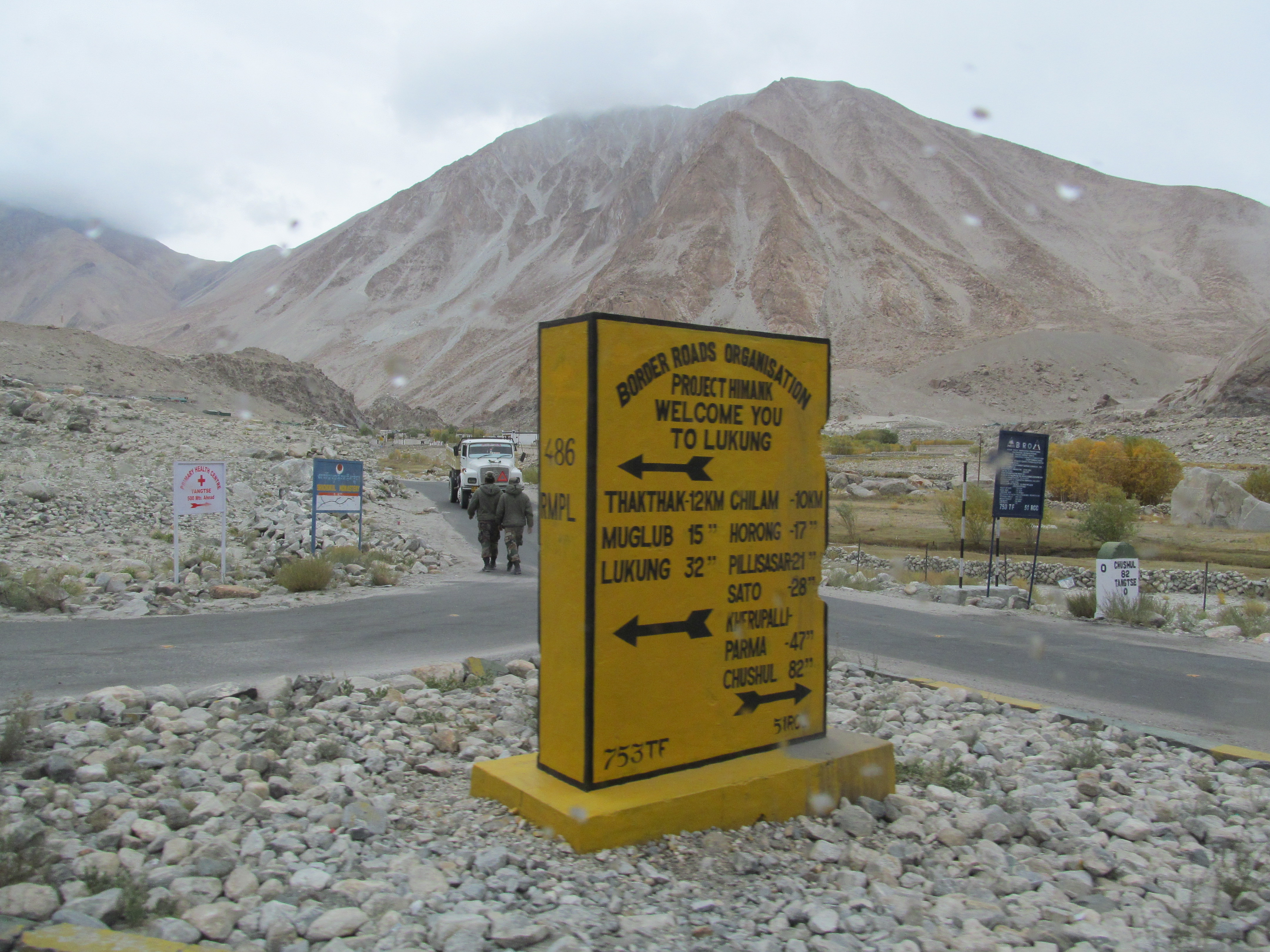
Road sign outside Tangtse, showing routes to Lukung (Pangong Lake) and Chushul (via the Loi Yogma valley)

Tangtse is located at the intersection of two major strands of the Karakoram fault system, called the Tangtse fault and the Pangong fault. The two faults sandwich the Pangong Range, at the northern periphery of which lies the village of Tangtse.

The Tangtse fault is home to the Lung or Long valley, divided into three sections: Long Kongma, Long Parma and Long Yogma (the upper, middle and lower sections). (Note: See Strachey, Physical Geography of Western Tibet (1854), p. 26 for the terminology of valleys. Moorcroft & Trebeck, Travels in the Himalayan Provinces, Vol. 1 (1841), pp. 445–448 contains a description of the valley.) In modern maps, the entire valley is labelled as Loi Yogma without any division into sections. The Tangtse River (or Lung Chu or Lung Yogma), originates in the south of Tangste near Kongta La on Chushul-Tansgte route, flows south to north through the valley, draining the western slopes of the Pangong Range as well as the eastern slopes of the Ladakh Range. It flows past Tangtse to join the Shyok River near Durbuk.

The Pangong fault was once home to a "Pangong River" which flowed through its valley during the pleistocene. But the river has been dammed by tectonic activity and has turned into the present Pangong Lake. The valley of the erstwhile effluent of the lake now houses the Mughlib stream, which joins the Tangtse River near the village of Tangtse. Even though the Ladakhis had no knowledge of the erstwhile "Pangong River" (it having predated the birth of humanity), they preserve a myth that the waters flowing into the Mughlib stream, from a "scanty spring at Wangtong", represent the filtered waters of the Pangong Lake. The Ladakhis thus regard the Tangtse village lying at the northwestern end of the Pangong Lake.

=== Trade routes ===
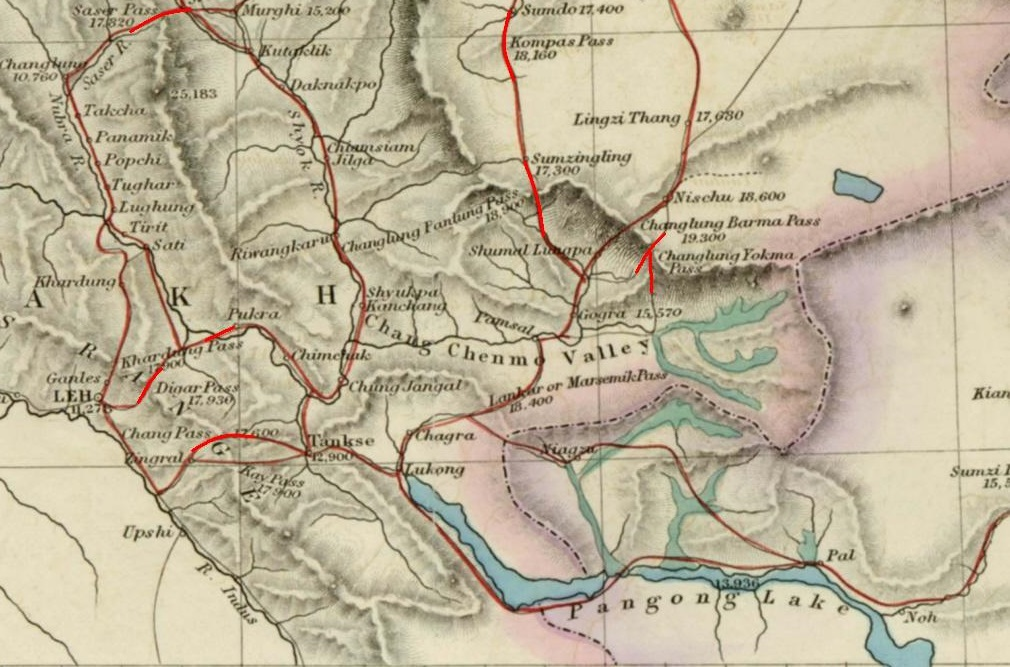
Trade routes of Ladakh, with the Chang Chenmo and Pangong routes passing through Tankse

From Tangtse, one is able to travel to Rudok and Gartok in Tibet via a number of routes, while Tangtse is also close to the Central Asian caravan route via Durbuk and the Karakoram Pass. According to Moravian Tibetologist F. A. Peter, there is evidence of the route having been used for centuries between Turkestan and Tibet. Historian Janet Rizvi has also acknowledged that the trade route between Turkestan and Tibet passed through Ladakh.

== History ==
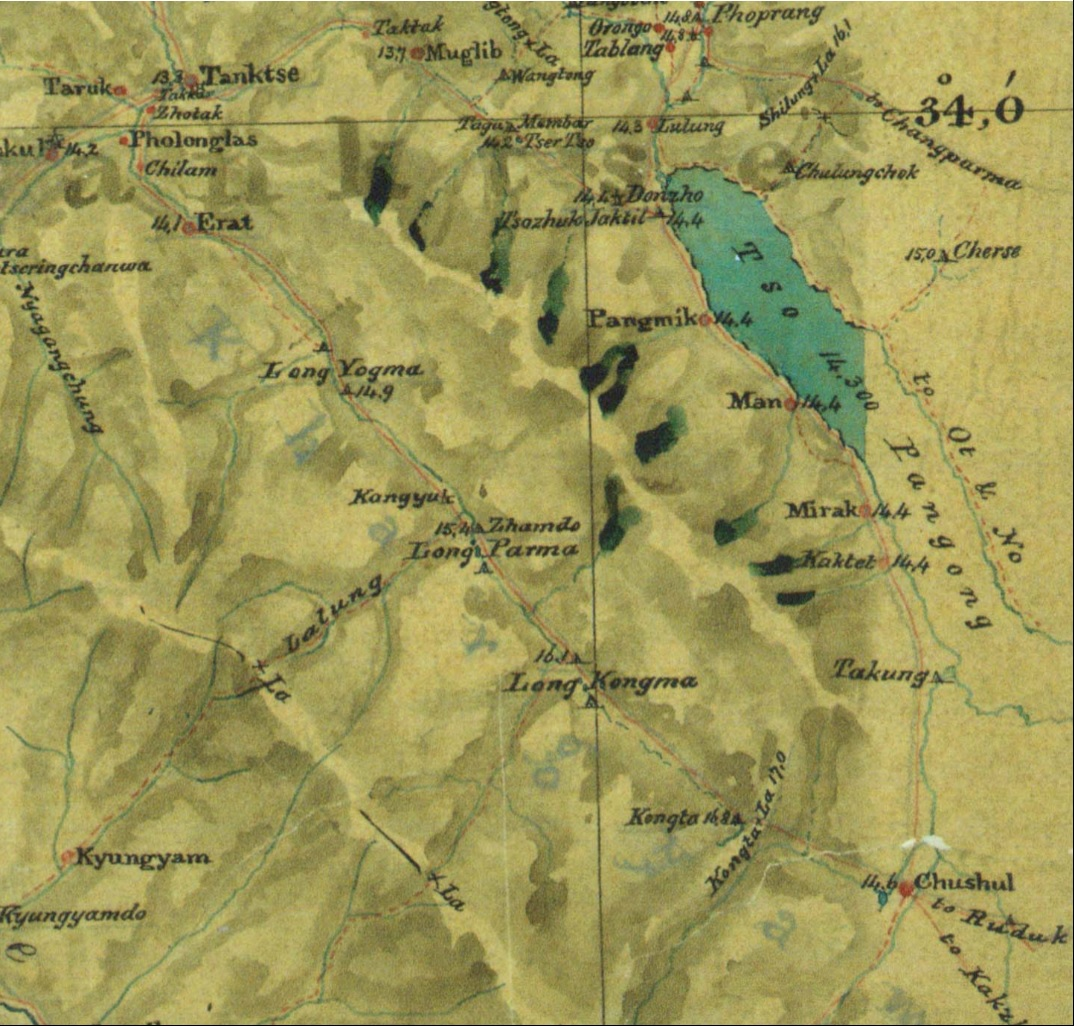
Tanktse, Chushul and the Loi Yogma valley in between (Strachey, 1851)

Tangtse lies at the border between the Nubra region (traditionally called Dumra) and the Pangong region. It played a key role in the two wars between the Ladakhis and Tibetans, the Tibet–Ladakh–Mughal War (1679–1684) and the Dogra–Tibetan War (1841–1842).

=== Tibet-Ladakh-Mughal War ===
In 1679, the Tibetan forces under the command of Galdan Chhewang fought an advance guard of Ladakhi forces in Guge (West Tibet). After defeating them, they invaded Ladakh itself. The route taken by the Tibetans is believed to have been via Rudok, Chushul and the Lung Chu valley. The Ladakhis joined the battle at Lung-Khung (Long Kongma) and repulsed the attack.

The following year, Tibet sent formidable reinforcements (estimated at 5,000 troops along with several seasoned commanders) and the Tibetans returned. A battle was fought at the "foot of the Chang La pass", which would again indicate the valley between Durbuk and Tangtse. Cunnigham gives the location of the final battle as Balaskya and Petech as dPal-rgyas. The Ladakhis were roundly defeated and withdrew to the fort of Basgo in northern Ladakh. After a three-year siege, they requested assistance from the Mughal forces in Kashmir, who fought off the Tibetans and chased them to the Pangong area.

Rudok and Guge, which were previously under the control of Ladakh, slipped out of Ladakhi hands. In 1684, they agreed to respect the new borders in a Treaty of Tingmosgang.

=== Dogra–Tibetan War ===
After the defeat of the Zorawar Singh's forces in West Tibet, the Tibetans were incited by Ladakhi rebels, who wanted to overthrow the Dogras ensconced in Ladakh. Apparently to lend support to them, the Tibetan forces marched to Ladakh and camped at "Dumra". The most likely location of this encampment is in the valley between Tangtse and Durbuk. It is reported that Lhasa dispatched additional 5,000 troops to join them here. The Tibetan accounts say that they established a defence post at "Lung-wu" (Long Yogma), which was described as a place between "Rudok and the Pangong Lake". (Note: It would appear that the "Rudok" stood for its frontier, somewhere near the Spanggur Gap, and "Pangong Lake" stood for Tangtse, with the Loi Yogma valley in between.)

The Ladakhi rebels had declared their minor king Jigmet Senge Namgyal as an independent ruler. He wrote to the Sikh emperor Sher Singh stating that he had submitted to the Chinese emperor and offered truce terms to the Sikhs. No response was received. After the arrival of reinforcements led by Dewan Hari Chand and Wazir Ratanu, the Dogras challenged the Tibetan encampments at Tangtse and the Long Yogma valley. Skirmishes continued for several days with a loss of 300 men for the Dogras. Eventually, the Dogras employed a decisive flooding tactic, following a suggestion from a Nubra chieftain, which dislodged the Tibetans from their trenches and led to a Dogra victory.

Afterwards a 'Treaty of Chushul' was agreed by the two sides, restoring the status quo ante bellum. The Ladakhi ruler was granted privileges appropriate to his rank. Trade and diplomatic missions were restored to their traditional mode.

=== Tankse ilaqa ===
During the Dogra rule, Tankse was the headquarters of a subdistrict (a kardari, often called an ilaqa), which controlled access to the Chang Chenmo Valley. Phobrang, Chushul, and Durbuk were under its control.

The Chang Chenmo route to Central Asia passed through Tankse, which the British attempted to promote as the main trade route between Leh and Yarkand in the late 19th century. Tankse was described as a large village with 50 houses. It had a rest house and a government supply depot. Travellers were advised to procure their supplies here, to sustain themselves till reaching Sanju, about 350 miles away.

With the eruption of the Sino-Indian border dispute in the late 1950s, the Indian government had ample documents from the time of Dogra administration to demonstrate that the Chang Chenmo Valley and the Aksai Chin plateau belonged to Ladakh. The Kashmir state records classified these regions as part of the Tankse ilaqa and revenue records were available with regular assessments and settlements of revenue. The revenue maps showed the large stretches of uninhabited territories, which are now occupied by China, as part of the Tankse ilaqa.

=== Rock Art ===
Tangtse is a well-known and important site of Tocharian, Sogdian, Śārāda and Arabic inscriptions. A Franco-Indian Archaeological Mission in Ladakh called the rock art at Tangste as "the most important" site for rock art in Ladakh, providing information about Ladakh towards the end of the 1st millennium AD. The mission found "about 300 petroglyphs" and "almost 70 rock inscriptions in various scripts". Some authors classify some of the signs here as tamgas. Volutes can be seen on some of the inscriptions of animals. Compositions from Ruthok and Tangtse are noted to be similar.

== Demographics ==
According to the 2011 census of India, Tangtse has 126 households. The effective literacy rate (i.e. the literacy rate of population excluding children aged 6 and below) is 69.93%.

Demographics (2011 Census)
	Total	Male	Female
Population	681	356	325
Children aged below 6 years	79	45	34
Scheduled caste	0	0	0
Scheduled tribe	679	355	324
Literates	421	261	160
Workers (all)	400	198	202
Main workers (total)	191	123	68
Main workers: Cultivators	73	40	33
Main workers: Agricultural labourers	2	2	0
Main workers: Household industry workers	5	3	2
Main workers: Other	111	78	33
Marginal workers (total)	209	75	134
Marginal workers: Cultivators	176	55	121
Marginal workers: Agricultural labourers	0	0	0
Marginal workers: Household industry workers	1	0	1
Marginal workers: Others	32	20	12
Non-workers	281	158	123

== Infrastructure ==
=== Energy and water ===
A solar power plant in Tangtse provides electricity for five hours every day to about 350 households. Previously, a government diesel generator provided electricity. The area has cellular network connectivity. The Indian Army also has renewable energy infrastructure here including a wind farm. Ground water resources have also been developed here with the help of Indian geologist Ritesh Arya.

=== Road ===
Tangtse, in the Ladakh Range, lies on Leh-Karu-Sakti-Zingral-Tangtse-Pangong Lake motorable road. Karu, which lies on Leh-Manali NH-3, connects Tangtse to Leh and the rest of India.

Between Zingral and Tangtse there are two motorable asphalt roads.

- The shorter router is through Zingral-Ke La pass-Taruk (Tharuk)-Tangtse alignment. The Ke La (also called "Kela Pass" and "Key La") on this route, one of the world's highest motorable road and pass at the height of 5,669.28 m or 18,600.0 ft, provides tourists access to the Lalok region of Ladakh. Kela Pass Tunnel, 7-8 km long twin-tube tunnel costing Rs 6,000 cr, is also planned for the all-weather connectivity between Leh-Pangong Tso. See also Tunnels in North West India.
- Other alternate route is through Zingral-Chang La-Durbuk-Tangtse alignment, on which the Chang La pass lies at the height of 5,391.3024 m or 17,688.000 ft.

=== Advanced Landing Ground ===
Parma Valley Advanced Landing Ground or Parma ALG is a proposed aerodrome for the Indian Air Force located in the Parma Valley (Long Parma). When reactivated, the ALG will facilitate the operations of IAF aircraft like C-295 and C-130J as well as the unmanned aerial vehicles (UAVs) and helicopters of the Indian Army Aviation Corps. A small unit will also be permanently stationed in the location for air traffic control roles.

The strip was used during the 1962 India-China War when Antonov An-12 aircraft of the IAF airlifted a troop of AMX-13 and 25 pounder guns for the Indian Army to Ladakh from Chandigarh Air Force Base on 25 October.

== See also ==
- India-China Border Roads
- Transport and tourism in Ladakh

== Bibliography ==
- Gazetteer of Kashmir and Ladak, Calcutta: Superintendent of Government Printing, 1890
- Charak, Sukhdev Singh (1983), General Zorawar Singh, Publications Division, Government of India – via archive.org
- Cunningham, Alexander (1854), Ladak: Physical, Statistical, Historical, London: Wm. H. Allen and Co – via archive.org
- Dortch, Jason M.; Owen, Lewis A.; Caffee, Marc W.; Kamp, Ulrich (2011). "Catastrophic partial drainage of Pangong Tso, northern India and Tibet". Geomorphology. 125 (1): 109–121. Bibcode:2011Geomo.125..109D. doi:10.1016/j.geomorph.2010.08.017. ISSN 0169-555X.
- Drew, Frederic (1873), "Alluvial and Lacustrine Deposits and Glacial Records of the Upper-Indus Basin", Quarterly Journal of the Geological Society of London: 441–471
- Drew, Frederic (1875), The Jummoo and Kashmir Territories: A Geographical Account, E. Stanford – via archive.org
- Fisher, Margaret W.; Rose, Leo E.; Huttenback, Robert A. (1963), Himalayan Battleground: Sino-Indian Rivalry in Ladakh, Praeger – via archive.org
- Francke, August Hermann (1926). Antiquities of Indian Tibet, Part 2. Calcutta: Superintendent Government Printing – via archive.org.
- Handa, O. C.; Hāṇḍā, Omacanda (2001), Buddhist Western Himalaya: A politico-religious history, Indus Publishing, ISBN 978-81-7387-124-5
- Moorcroft, William; Trebeck, George (2004), Travels in the Himalayan Provinces of Hindustan and the Punjab in Ladakh and Kashmir: In Peshawar, Kabul, Kunduz and Bokhara from 1819 to 1825, Volume 1, London: John Murray, ISBN 978-81-206-0497-1 – via archive.org
- Petech, Luciano (September 1947), "The Tibetan-Ladakhi Moghul War of 1681-83", The Indian Historical Quarterly, 23 (3): 169– – via archive.org
- Phartiyal, Binita; Singh, Randheer; Nag, Debarati (2017), "Trans- and Tethyan Himalayan Rivers: In Reference to Ladakh and Lahaul-Spiti, NW Himalaya", in Dhruv Sen Singh (ed.), The Indian Rivers: Scientific and Socio-economic Aspects, Springer, pp. 367–382, ISBN 978-981-10-2984-4
- Searle, Mike (2013), Colliding Continents: A geological exploration of the Himalaya, Karakoram, and Tibet, Oxford University press, ISBN 978-0-19-165249-3
- Shakabpa, Tsepon Wangchuk Deden (2009), One Hundred Thousand Moons: An Advanced Political History of Tibet, BRILL, ISBN 978-90-04-17732-1
- Strachey, Henry (1854), Physical Geography of Western Tibet, London: William Clows and Sons – via archive.org
- Bruneau, Laurianne; Bellezza, John Vincent (December 2013). "Inner Asian cultural adaptation, regional differentiation and the 'Western Tibetan Plateau'" (PDF). Revue d'Études Tibétaines. 28: 5–161.
