= Chumathang =

- Village and Tehsil
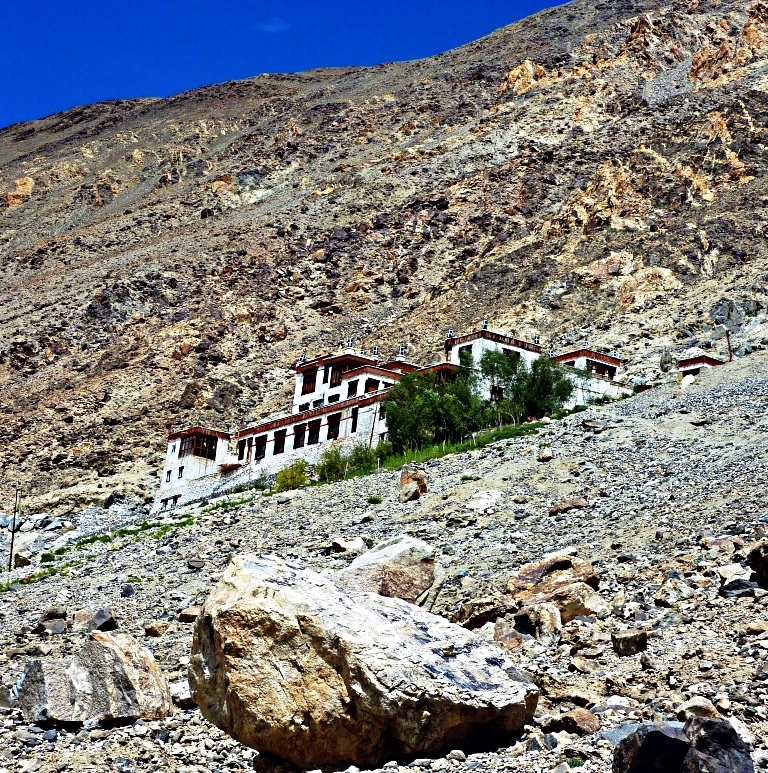
- Chumathang gompa

- Location in Ladakh, India Chumathang (India)
- Coordinates: 33.36°N 78.34°E
- Country: India
- Union Territory: Ladakh
- District: Changthang
- Tehsil: Chumathang
- Elevation: 3,950 m (12,960 ft)

Population (2011)
  - Total: 641

Languages
  - Official: Hindi, English
  - Spoken: Laddakh, Boti
- Time zone: UTC+5:30 (IST)
- PIN: 194201
- Census code: 900

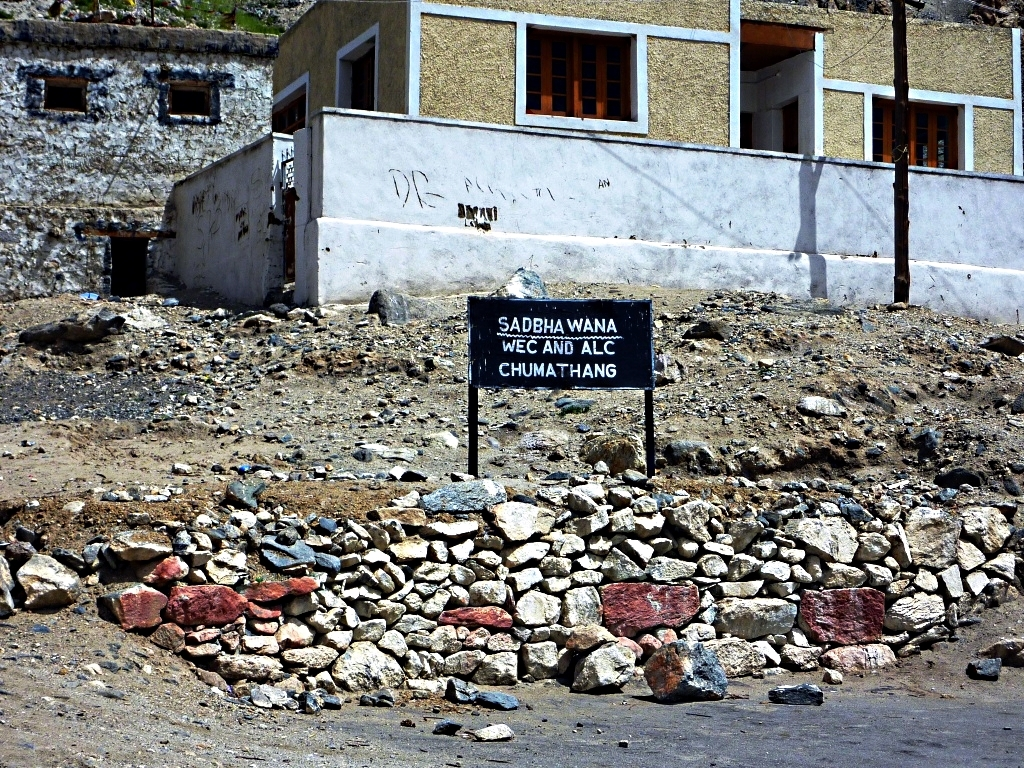
Chumathang dhaba and sign

Chumathang is a town and one of the tehsil in Changthang district, Ladakh in northern India on the banks of the Indus River. Chumathang is among the first habitation in the Changthang region to have its own power station and government high school which was only possible under the guidance of Hemis and Chemday Monastery. Famous for its hot spring which attracts many tourists all over the world, even the local people come every year to take the medicinal benefits from the hot spring. There is an old monastery or gonpa which is located near the road which is about more than 400 years old and is among the oldest monasteries of Ladakh.

== Location ==
Chumathang 138 km (86 miles) southeast of Leh, and 41 km northwest of Nyoma, and 29 km (18 miles) from Kiari, where there is a small medical centre run by the Indian Army.

== Demographics ==
According to the 2011 census of India, Chumathang has 127 households. The effective literacy rate (i.e. the literacy rate of population excluding children aged 6 and below) is 68.03%.

Demographics (2011 Census)
	Total	Male	Female
Population	641	237	404
Children aged below 6 years	56	29	27
Scheduled caste	0	0	0
Scheduled tribe	635	231	404
Literates	398	159	239
Workers (all)	222	106	116
Main workers (total)	132	97	35
Main workers: Cultivators	72	56	16
Main workers: Agricultural labourers	0	0	0
Main workers: Household industry workers	4	1	3
Main workers: Other	56	40	16
Marginal workers (total)	90	9	81
Marginal workers: Cultivators	74	2	72
Marginal workers: Agricultural labourers	0	0	0
Marginal workers: Household industry workers	0	0	0
Marginal workers: Others	16	7	9
Non-workers	419	131	288

== Tourism ==
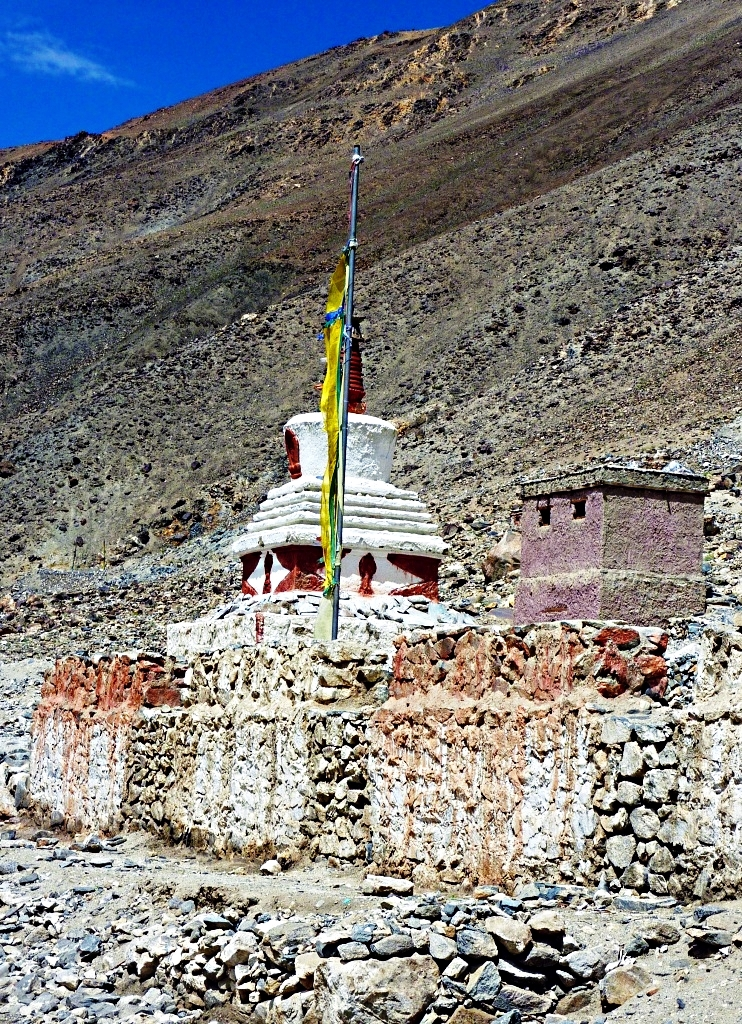
Chumathang chorten

There are a few small dhabas or restaurants here making it a good spot to lunch and visit the hot springs which are about 2 km to the east. There is also a basic guesthouse and small store in the village. Near the hot springs is the Hot Spring Resort which has many basic rooms - one with a hot bath. Chumathang also offers Himalayan homestays which are suitable for those who like to live and take a little peek in a local Ladakhi house and stay there for a day or two.

Travellers coming from the south will find that Chumathang is significantly lower than the Tso Moriri lake, making it a good stop for people suffering from altitude sickness. Now there are many facilities like 24\7 electricity and 4G network which finally got upgraded in 2022.

The gigantic gompa or monastery of the village chumathang was constructed by the people of the village without any mere use of machines under the supervision of Gonbo Chemet Dorjey(GC Dorjey).

== Transport ==
"Chumathang-Chushul Road" (CC Road) was completed by December 2023.
