= Himya =

- Village
- Location in Ladakh, India Himya (India)
- Coordinates: 33.389233°N 78.186378°E
- Country: India
- Union Territory: Ladakh
- District: Changthang
- Tehsil: Himya

Population (2011)
  - Total: 265
- Time zone: UTC+5:30 (IST)
- Census code: 887

Himya or Hemya is a village and one of the tehsil in the Changthang district in the Indian union territory of Ladakh.

== Demographics ==
According to the 2011 census of India, Himya has 52 households. The effective literacy rate (i.e. the literacy rate of population excluding children aged 6 and below) is 74.26%.

Demographics (2011 Census)
	Total	Male	Female
Population	265	132	133
Children aged below 6 years	28	16	12
Scheduled caste	0	0	0
Scheduled tribe	265	132	133
Literates	176	107	69
Workers (all)	185	91	94
Main workers (total)	180	90	90
Main workers: Cultivators	174	87	87
Main workers: Agricultural labourers	1	0	1
Main workers: Household industry workers	0	0	0
Main workers: Other	5	3	2
Marginal workers (total)	5	1	4
Marginal workers: Cultivators	1	0	1
Marginal workers: Agricultural labourers	1	1	0
Marginal workers: Household industry workers	0	0	0
Marginal workers: Others	3	0	3
Non-workers	80	41	39
