= Demchok =

Demchok may refer to:

== Places ==
- Charding Nullah or Lhari stream and Demchok River, a trans-boundary river between India and China
  - Demchok sector, a disputed territory divided between India and China, dissected by the river
  - Demchok (historical village), a former village constituting the above territory, now divided into
    - Demchok, Ladakh, India
    - Dêmqog, Ngari Prefecture, Tibet, China

== Religion ==
- Khorlo Demchok, Tibetan name of Cakrasaṃvara Tantra in Vajrayana Buddhism
  - Demchok, the Buddhist Tantric deity of Khorlo Demchok

== See also ==
- Parigas (disambiguation), Chinese name for the region
- Demchuk, a Ukrainian surname
- Demchugdongrub, the leader of the Japanese puppet state of Mengjiang
