= Parigas =

Parigas may refer to:

== Places ==
- Parigas region, Chinese name for the disputed Demchok sector in India and China
  - Parigas, Chinese name for Demchok, Ladakh (the Indian administered part of the region)

== See also ==
- Demchok (disambiguation)
