= Ukdungle =

- Military Base
- Location in Ladakh, India Ukdungle (India)
- Coordinates: 32°36′05″N 78°57′55″E
- Country: India
- Union Territory: Ladakh
- District: Changthang
- Elevation: 4,667 m (15,312 ft)

Languages
  - Official: Ladakhi, Urdu
- Time zone: UTC+5:30 (IST)

Ukdungle is a small Indian Army military compound, with a helipad ALG, entirely contained within a 40 by 70 meter area in Changthang district, Ladakh in northern India, 48 km west of Demchok village on the Line of Actual Control with Tibet. Nurbula pass is close to this place.

Hanle-Ukdungle-Imis La-Tashigang traditional trade and pilgrimage route to Tibet formerly ran from Hanle (40 km north of Ukdungle) to Imis La (south of Ukdungle), crossed into the Indus valley via Charding La near Demchok and Dêmqog, and proceeded to Tashigang (Zhaxigang) in Tibet. This traditional trade route to Tibet is now closed.

== See also ==
- Chumar
- Demchok
- Tso Moriri
- India–China Border Roads
