= Punguk =

- Village
- Location in Ladakh, India Punguk (India)
- Coordinates: 32.7597237°N 78.8911056°E
- Country: India
- Union Territory: Ladakh
- District: Leh
- Tehsil: Nyoma

Languages
  - Official: Hindi and English
- Time zone: UTC+5:30 (IST)

Punguk is a small settlement in Nyoma tehsil, Leh district. It is located on the west of the Indian Astronomical Observatory, Hanle.

== Location ==
The settlement is located near the India China border. It is accessible from the east via Hanle and from the south via Ukdungle, an Indian Army base.

According to a report published by Geological Survey of India in 1980, the area around Punguk is known for geothermal springs..Moreover,It is known for its dark sky(Bortle 1) as it is a remote village.
