= Hanle, Ladakh =

Hanle
- Town
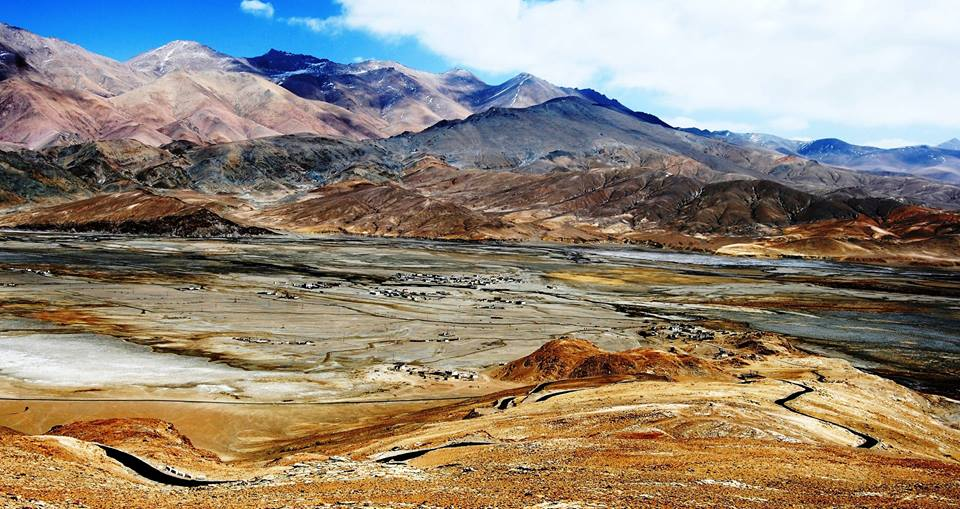
- Hanle Town

- Location in Ladakh, India Hanle (India)
- Coordinates: 32.79°N 79.00°E
- Country: India
- Union Territory: Ladakh
- District: Changthang
- Tehsil: Anlay

Population (2011)
  - Total: 1,879

Languages
  - Official: Ladakhi and English
- Time zone: UTC+5:30 (IST)

Hanle (or Anlay) is a town and tehsil in the Changthang district of the Indian union territory of Ladakh. It is located in the Hanle River valley on an old branch of the ancient Ladakh–Tibet trade route. It comprises six hamlets called Bhok, Dhado, Punguk, Khuldo, Naga and a Tibetan Refugee habitation. It is the site of the 17th-century Hanle Monastery of the Drukpa Kagyu branch of Tibetan Buddhism.

Hanle hosts the Hanle observatory, an ISO Indian Astronomical Observatory, the tenth highest on the list of highest astronomical observatories in the world.

== Geography ==
Hanle is located in the valley of the Hanle River in the Changthang region of Ladakh. The river originates near Imis La on the Indo-Tibetan border at 5,290 m (17,360 ft), and flows north, joining the Indus River at Loma, close to the town of Nyoma. After zig-zagging through mountain gorges for 60 km, the river enters a wide plain, called Nilamkhul or the Hanle plain, which has been called an "oasis of fertility" in an otherwise arid Changthang. A seasonal river called Kongra Chu or Khaptak Tokpo, flows in from the west and joins the Hanle River here. The plain is dotted with grazing grounds. Six hamlets called Bhok, Dhado, Punguk, Khuldo, Naga and a Tibetan Refugee habitation make the Hanle village. At the centre of the plain is a mountain rising to an elevation of 4,536 metres, on top of which sits the Hanle monastery. To the east of the Hanle plain, there is an opening in the ridgeline, allowing the Hanle River to pass into an intermontane valley bounded by ridges, through which it flows northwards to Loma.

A road running through the Hanle valley from Loma is the quickest way to reach Hanle from Chushul and Pangong Tso side. In 2012, the road terminated near Hanle (see "Transport" section for new road connectivity), the traditional trade and pilgrimage corridor formerly ran up the Hanle valley to Imis La, crossed into the Indus valley via Charding La near Demchok and Dêmqog, and proceeded to Tashigang in Tibet. This traditional trade route to Tibet is now closed.

Hanle is also connected to Koyul river valley to the east via a winding mountain road that passes through the Photi La pass.

== Demographics ==
According to the 2011 census of India, Hanle or Anlay has 371 households. The literacy rate is 61.46%.

Demographics (2011 Census)
	Total	Male	Female
Population	1879	883	996
Children aged below 6 years	239	125	114
Scheduled caste	2	2	0
Scheduled tribe	888	422	466
Literates	1008	559	449
Workers (all)	596	427	169
Main workers (total)	205	130	75
Main workers: Cultivators	33	25	8
Main workers: Agricultural labourers	16	4	12
Main workers: Household industry workers	0	0	0
Main workers: Other	156	101	55
Marginal workers (total)	391	297	94
Marginal workers: Cultivators	268	230	38
Marginal workers: Agricultural labourers	47	13	34
Marginal workers: Household industry workers	1	0	1
Marginal workers: Others	75	54	21
Non-workers	1283	456	827

== History ==
Hanle is mentioned by name in the settlement document of the kingdom of Maryul in c. 930 AD, as forming one of its frontiers: "Wam-le (Hanle), to the top of the pass of the Yi-mig rock (Imis pass)". To the west of this frontier were the highlands of Rupshu and, beyond it, Zanskar.

Sengge Namgyal (r. 1616–1642) built the prominent Hanle monastery in association with Tatsang Repa (Stag-tsang-ras-pa), the notable Buddhist priest of the Drukpa ("red hat") sect. Sengge Namgyal died here in 1642 after his return from an expedition against the Mongols who had occupied the Tibetan province of Tsang and were threatening Ladakh's possessions in Tibet.

== Demographics ==
According to the 2011 census of India, Anlay has 371 households. The literacy rate (i.e. the literacy rate of population excluding children aged 6 and below) is 61.46%.

Demographics (2011 Census)
	Total	Male	Female
Population	1879	883	996
Children aged below 6 years	239	125	114
Scheduled caste	2	2	0
Scheduled tribe	888	422	466
Literates	1008	559	449
Workers (all)	596	427	169
Main workers (total)	205	130	75
Main workers: Cultivators	33	25	8
Main workers: Agricultural labourers	16	4	12
Main workers: Household industry workers	0	0	0
Main workers: Other	156	101	55
Marginal workers (total)	391	297	94
Marginal workers: Cultivators	268	230	38
Marginal workers: Agricultural labourers	47	13	34
Marginal workers: Household industry workers	1	0	1
Marginal workers: Others	75	54	21
Non-workers	1283	456	827

== Hanle Observatory ==
Hanle is home to the Indian Astronomical Observatory. The location of the village and the observatory are highly sensitive due to the close proximity of the Tibetan / Chinese border.

India set up the Himalayan Chandra Telescope, a 2m gamma ray telescope at Hanle. The Major Atmospheric Cerenkov Experiment Telescope (MACE), which is under construction in Hanle, will be the world's highest Cerenkov telescope and the second largest Cerenkov telescope in the world. It was originally scheduled to become operational by 2016, but plans were pushed back to begin operations in 2020.

Stable Auroral Red (SAR) arcs were observed in Hanle in April 2023 and November 2023, as well as during the May 2024 solar storms.

== Wildlife ==
The Hanle valley harbours kiang and the largest known Tibetan gazelle population in India. The wetlands in the Hanle basin teem with migratory birds including bar-headed goose and the black-necked crane.

== Transport ==
Nyoma Airstrip in the northwest and Fukche Airstrip in the east are 74 km and 24 km away, respectively, and the village of Ukdungle is in the south. Hanle is an important stopover from mainland India to Ukdungle in the Chumar sector.

Hanle-Kaza-Tabo Road is being constructed by the BRO under the Indo-China Border Roads (ICBR) scheme. This road connects to and partially overlaps with the 125 km long Kiato-Karzok Road, from Kiato (near Kaza in Spiti Valley in Himachal Pradesh) through the Takling La Tunnel (5575 m) to Karzok (on shores of Tso Moriri), being constructed by the BRO as fourth alternative route to Ladakh.

Hanle-Zursar-Imis La Road was completed by December 2023.

== See also ==
- Demchok sector
- Geography of Ladakh
- India-China border infrastructure
- Tourism in Ladakh
