= Lagankhel =

Lagankhel may refer to:

- Lagankhel, Ladakh, a village in the Demchok region of Ladakh, India
- A ward in Lalitpur, Nepal
