= Pallavi Fauzdar =

Indian high-altitude motorcycle rider

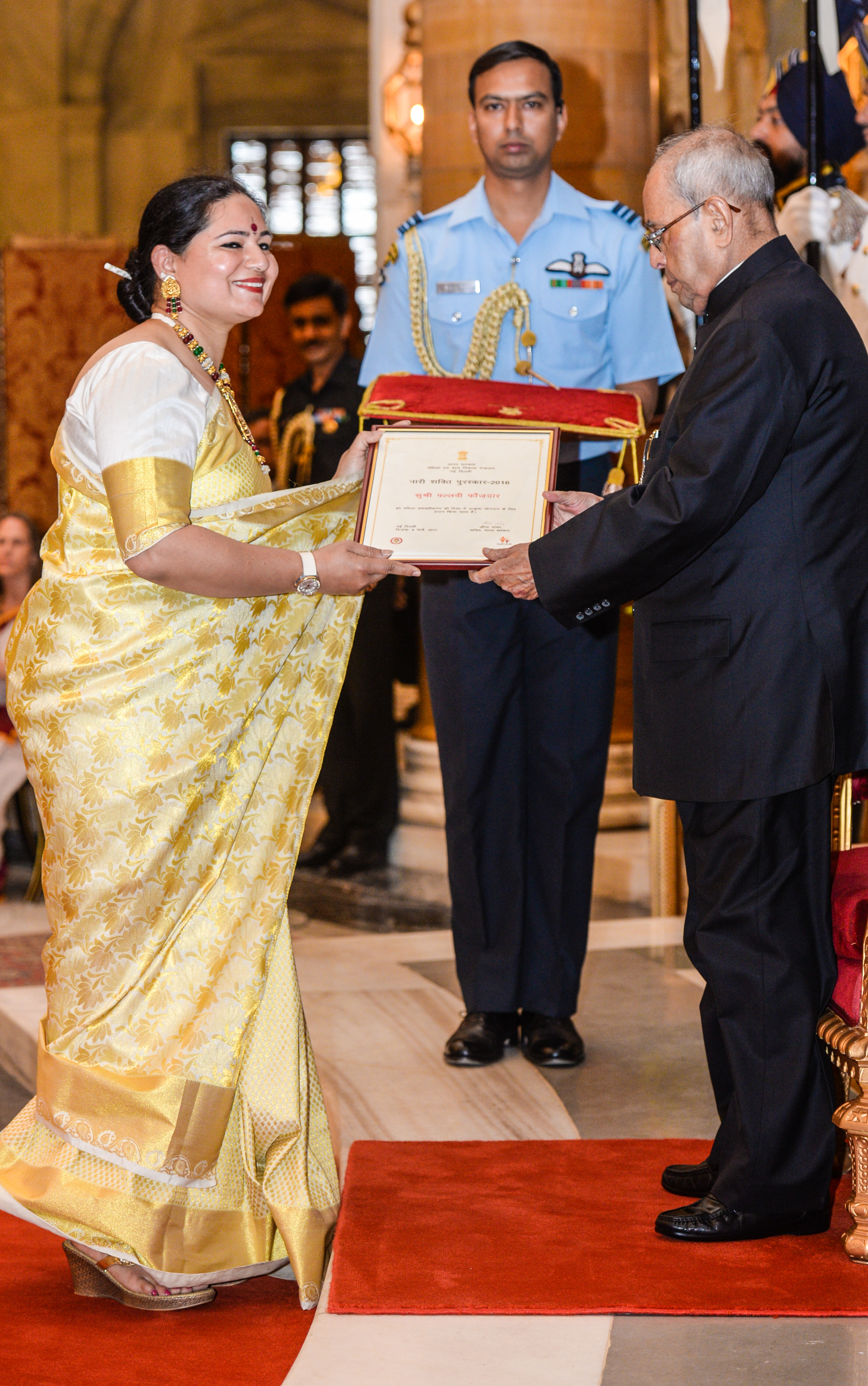
- Pallavi Fauzdar receiving Nari Shakti Award by the President of India at Rastrapati Bhawan, New Delhi
- Born: 20 December 1979 (age 46); Agra, India
- Occupations: motorcyclist and social worker
- Known for: solo, high altitude motorcycle records

Pallavi Fauzdar (born 20 December 1979) is an Indian woman best known for her high altitude motorcycle riding and her social work. Her exploits have been recognised by a number of firsts in the Limca Book of Records.

== Early life and background ==
Pallavi Fauzdar was born in Agra, Uttar Pradesh, India. Her father is Ashok Fauzdar, a retired electrical engineer. She first showed interest in riding motorcycles at the age of 14, riding her father's motorcycle. She married in 2004, has 2 children and lives in New Delhi.

== Career ==
Pallavi Fauzdar started her riding career by joining a riding group in New Delhi. Her first notable exploit was in 2015, a solo ride to Mana Pass at an altitude of 5638m or 18774 ft above sea level, then the highest motorable pass in the world. Her feat was recognised by the Limca Book of Records. That year she created another record by riding to eight mountain passes above 5000m in a single trip. Pallavi then continued to ride in mountains covering new passes and remote routes. She also did social work by doing cause-awareness rides in various parts of the country. In 2017 Pallavi rode to the Ladakh region of India and scaled the Umling La Pass at 5803m or 19323 ft, the first person to do so. The Umling La pass is now the world's highest motorable pass.

== Records ==
Pallavi currently holds the following Limca Book records:

Record	Issuer	date	place	Ref
First woman to ride eight mountain passes above 5000m in a single trip	Limca Book of Records, India	18 July 2015	Ladakh, India	
First woman solo motorcyclist to ride to Mana Pass at an altitude of 5638m or 18774 ft	Limca Book of Records, India	24 September 2015	Uttarakhand, India	
First woman motorcyclist to ride to the highest freshwater lake, Lake Deotal situated at 5471 m or 17950 ft	Limca Book of Records, India	24 September 2015	Uttarakhand, India	
First motorcyclist to ride to the newly opened highest motorable pass in the world the Umlingla Pass situated at 5803 m or 19303 ft	Limca Book of Records, India	4 August 2017	Ladakh, India	

== Recognition and awards ==
Pallavi's work and achievements have been recognized at the national level and she has received the following awards:

Award	Issuer	date	Place	Ref
The Nari Shakti Puraskar given by the President Of India	Government of India	8 March 2017	Delhi, India	
Outstanding global woman of Uttar Pradesh (UP) by the Chief Minister of the State of UP	Government of the State of UP, India	30 April 2016	Lucknow, India	
DLA Woman of the Year Award 2016–2017	DLA Newspaper	24 May 2017	Agra, India	
The Rani Lakshmibai Veerta Puruskar 2017 by the Shri Yogi Adiyanath, the Chief Minister of the state of UP.	Government of the State of UP, India	26 March 2018	Lucknow, India	

== Social work ==
Pallavi has worked with Non-governmental organisations and the Women and Child Department of Government of the State of UP as brand Ambassador of Women and Child Helpline 181 and "Beti Bachao Beti Padhao" campaign for the support of women and children.

== Television ==
Pallavi regularly gives media interviews on television and to media houses including DD National.
