= Hanle Monastery =

17th-century gompa in Ladakh, India

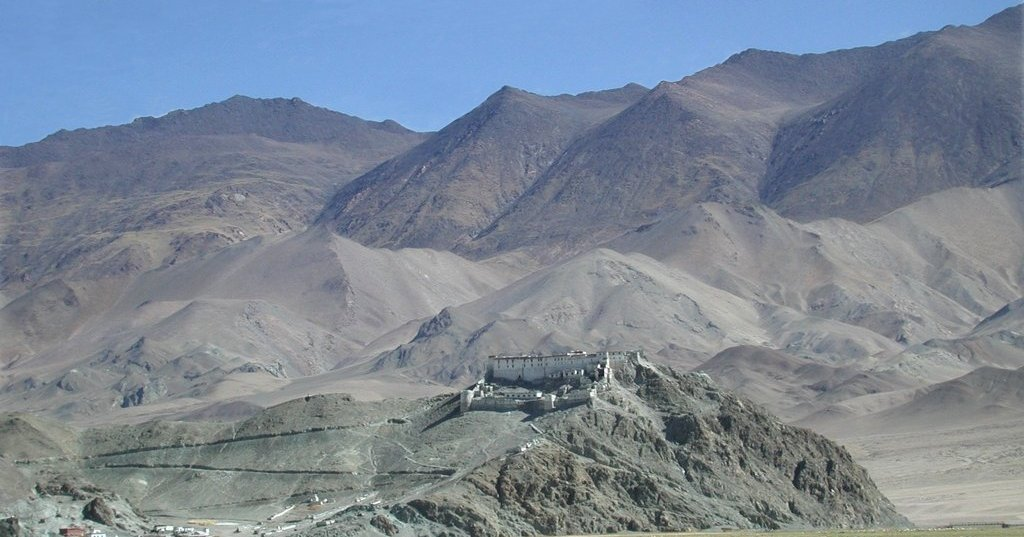
- Hanle Monastery

- Location in Ladakh union territory, India

Religion
- Affiliation: Tibetan Buddhism
- Sect: Drukpa

Location
- Location: Hanle, Leh District, Ladakh, India
- Interactive map of Hanle Monastery
- Coordinates: 32°47′26″N 79°0′7″E

Architecture
- Style: Tibetan Architecture
- Founder: Sengge Namgyal
- Established: 17th century

Hanle Monastery is a 17th-century gompa of the Drukpa Lineage of the Kagyu school of Tibetan Buddhism located in the Hanle Valley, Leh district, Ladakh, India on an old branch of the ancient Ladakh-Tibet trade route. The valley is home to about a thousand people, with about 300 people living in Hanle village. The monastery is home to about ten monks while another 33 or so come regularly for prayers. It is only 19 kilometres (12 mi) from the disputed frontier between India and Chinese-controlled Tibet. It is 255 km southeast of Leh, 208 km southeast of Upshi & 75 km southeast of Nyoma.

The main monastery, one of the largest and best known of Ladakh's monasteries, was built under the patronage of the Ladakhi king Sengge Namgyal (r. c. 1616-1642 CE) with the assistance of the famous Tibetan lama and traveler Taktsang Répa Ngakwang Gyatso (Wylie: stag tshang ras pa ngag dbang rgya mtsho). It was the first to be associated with the Drukpa Lineage and which, under the patronage of the Namgyal family, became very important in Ladakh, functioning as a serious rival to the reformed Gelug school. The monasteries in Hanle, Hemis, Chemrey and Stakna all belong to the Drukpa school.

Sengge Namgyal died at Hanle on his return from an expedition against the Mongols, who had occupied Tsang and were threatening Ladakh.

Outside donations established the Tashi Choeling ("Auspicious Dharma Centre") in 1983 providing support for resident nuns (who numbered 47 in 2003). In a January, 2004 article it is said to have had only 10 resident monks with 33 coming regularly for prayers.

It is also home to the Indian Astronomical Observatory. The location of both the village and the observatory are highly sensitive due to the close proximity of the Tibetan / Chinese border and special permission is needed to visit either by the government of India. Fukche airport is 24 kilometres (15 mi) away and Ukdungle is close by.

== See also ==
- List of buddhist monasteries in Ladakh
- Tourism in Ladakh
