= Rickshaw Run =

Indian event

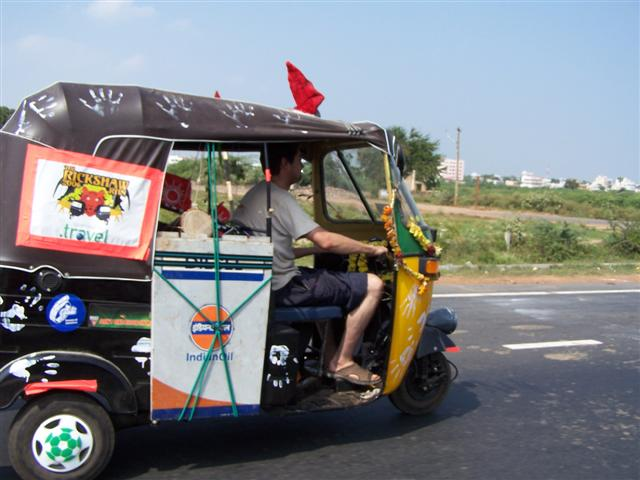
Driving along the road

The Rickshaw Run is an event where teams drive Auto Rickshaws along various routes across India. The first route in December 2006 was from Kochi, in the southern state of Kerala, to Darjeeling, in West Bengal. In its inaugural run, 34 teams started the event, and 31 of those finished. The rickshaw run has involved dangerous road incidents occurring during the 'race'.

The Rickshaw Run is organised by the Adventurists, who also organise the Mongol Rally.

== Where and when ==
The Rickshaw Run takes place every 4 months in January, April and August in India. The route changes each time but starts from the finishing point of the previous run. Initially the route just included India but by the second Run teams were going through Nepal. Currently Rajasthan, Kerala and Meghalaya hosts the starting/ending points for each version of the run.

Past Rickshaw Runs

1. 2006/07 Winter Run (26/12/06) started in Kochi and finished in Darjeeling.
2. 2007 Summer Run (30/06/07) started in Kolkata and finished in Manali.
3. 2007/08 Winter Run (31/12/07) starting in Kochi and finishing in Kathmandu, Nepal.
4. 2008 Summer Run (01/06/08) starting in Kathmandu and finishing in Pondicherry.
5. 2008/09 Winter Run (01/1/09) starting in Pondicherry and finishing in Shillong.
6. 2009 Easter Run (04/11/09) starting in Shillong and finishing in Goa.
7. 2009 Fall Run (13/09/09) starting on Goa and finishing in Pokhara, Nepal.
8. 2010 Spring Run (28/03/10) stating in Kochi and finishing in Gangtok, Sikkim.
9. 2011 Winter (2/1/11) stating in Jaisalmer to and finishing in Kochi.
10. 2013 Spring Run (7/4/13) Starting in Kochi and finished in Shillong
11. 2013 Autumn Run (8/9/13) Starting in Shillong and finished in Jaisalmer.
12. 2016 Autumn Run (8/9/13) Starting in Shillong and finished in Kochi.
13. 2016 Autumn Run Starting in Shillong and finished in Kochi.
14. 2017 January - Kochi to Jaisalmer
15. 2017 April - Jaisalmer to Kochi
16. 2017 August - Kochi to Jaisalmer

74 teams started in the 2013 spring run in Kochi in the south western corner of the country. Out of those 70 finished. Most teams travelled along the east coast of India, taking the 'easy route' but a handful of hardcore teams went 'up the centre' passing through places such as Mysore, Nagpur, Varanasi and even making their way up to Darjeeling. The teams that went the central route travelled more than 4000 km in their rickshaws on some of the worst roads in India.

== Charity donations ==
Each team has to raise a minimum of £1,000 for charities working in India and Nepal. The main charities for the Rickshaw Run are Mercy Corps, Frank Water and Save the Children, depending on where the Rickshaw Run takes place. Each team consists of one rickshaw and between one and four drivers. The Rickshaw is a vehicle designed to transport light loads over small distances on paved roads, making it a challenge to cover long distances.

== World Records ==
During the 2022 Himalaya edition of the Rickshaw Run, two teams (Canadian and Swiss) set the record for the worlds highest auto rickshaw, over the Umling La Pass, at 5800 meters/19024 feet.
