= Demchuk =

Demchuk (written: Демчуҝ) is a Ukrainian surname. Notable people with the name include:

- Andrii Demchuk (born 1987), Ukrainian wheelchair fencer
- Andriy Demchuk (born 1974), Ukrainian weightlifter
- David Demchuk (born 19??), Canadian playwright and novelist
- Serhiy Demchuk (born 19??), Ukrainian paralympic swimmer

== See also ==
- Demchok (disambiguation)
- Demchugdongrub (sometimes spelled Demchukdonrov), the leader of the Japanese puppet state of Mengjiang
