= Umling La =

Mountain pass in Ladakh, India

- Umlung La
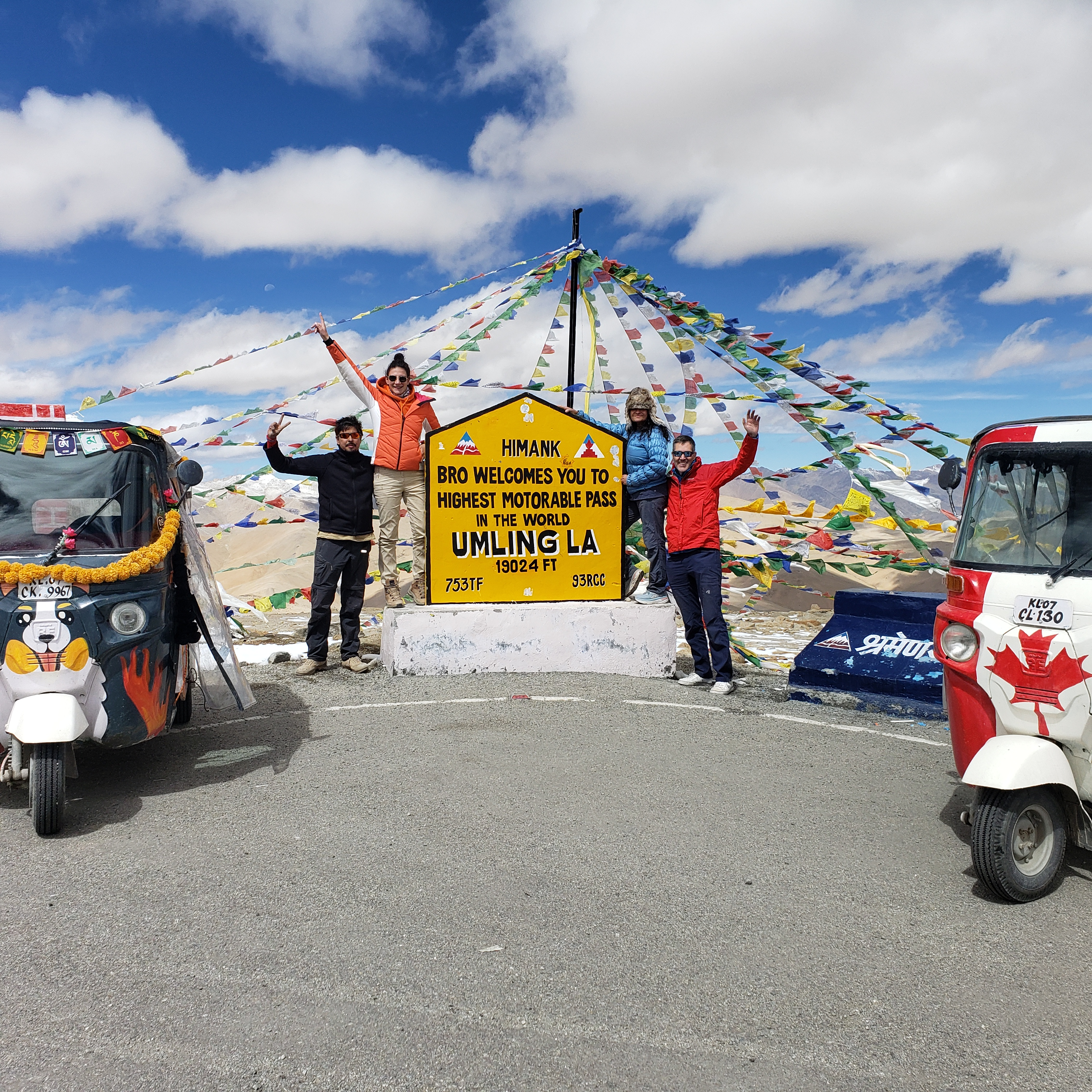
- Summit, with two auto rickshaws of the Swiss and Canadian teams who were participating in the Rickshaw Run in 2022 and had set of World Record of Worlds highest Auto-Rickshaws.

- Location within Ladakh
- Interactive map of Umling La
- Elevation: 19,024 feet (5,799 m)

Location
- Location: Ladakh, India
- Range: Himalaya, Ladakh Range
- Coordinates: 32°41′35″N 79°16′17″E

Umling La or Umlung La, elevation 19,024 feet (5,799 m), is a mountain pass in the Changthang area of Ladakh, India near the village of Demchok. It is on the ridgeline that divides Koyul Lungpa and the Indus River at an elevation of 19,024 feet (5,799 m). It forms the source for the Umlung stream that drains into the Indus River and a tributary of the Kiungdul river that drains into Koyul Lungpa.

The Umling La pass is traversed by a road between Chisumle and Demchok, called the Umling La Road, which previously held the title for the world's highest motorable road from 2017 to 2025, when it was surpassed by another higher motorable road over the Mig La 19,400 feet (5,900 m) also in India.

== Transport ==
Chisumle-Umling La-Demchok Road (CUD Road), Chisumle to Umling La and Demchok paved motorable road was constructed in 2017 by the Border Roads Organisation of India. Umling La is 25 km east of Chisumle.

== Route ==
Leh → Upshi → Chumathang → Mahe → Nyoma → Hanle → Photi La → Umling La

Approximate Distance from Leh: 230–250 km

Travel Time: 8–10 hours depending on road conditions.

== World records ==
=== 2017–2025: world's highest motorable road ===
From 2017 to 2025, the Chisumle–Umling La–Demchok road was world's highest motorable road as the elevation of Umling La 19,024 feet (5,799 m) surpassed the record previously held by the 18,953-foot (5,777 m) Uturuncu volcano road in Bolivia, making it the world's highest motorable road, however CUDR was surpassed in 2025 by Mig La Road. (Note: In 2025, a motorable road through the higher Mig La pass at 19,400 feet (5,900 m) constructed by BRO.) CUDR road is higher than Mount Everest's South Base Camp, which is at 17,598 feet (5,364 m), and over half the cruising altitude of commercial jet airlines. The environment posed severe challenges for construction, with winter temperatures falling to −40 °C (−40 °F), and oxygen levels 50% lower than at sea level.

=== 2022: Autorickshaw world record ===
On 16 September 2022, at 11:04 a.m. (Indian Standard Time), a Canadian team (Greg Harris and Priya Singh) and a Swiss team (Michele Daryanani & Nevena Lazarevic) set the world record for the highest altitude at which an auto rickshaw has ever been driven. The two teams set the record by driving to the summit of Umling La Pass at an altitude of 5,799 meters (19,024 feet). The two teams were participating in the Rickshaw Run (Himalayan Edition), an event promoted by The Adventurists, where teams drive auto rickshaws from the Thar desert town of Jaisalmer in Rajasthan to the Himalayan town of Leh in Ladakh. Rickshaw Run teams are given the start and finish lines, but are otherwise unsupported and left to their own navigational choices in completing the approximately 2,300 km journey.

== See also ==
- Demchok sector
- India–China Border Roads
- List of mountain passes of India
