= Charding Nullah =

Small river on the border between China and India

Charding Nullah Lhari stream
- Charding Nullah relative to the Kashmir region

- Charding Nullah relative to the Tibet Autonomous Region
- Nickname: Demchok River

Location
- country: India, China
- province: Ladakh, Tibet Autonomous Region
- district: Leh, Ngari Prefecture
- subdistrict: Nyoma, Gar

Physical characteristics
- Source
  - location: Charding La
  - coordinates: 32.5573°N 79.3838°E
  - elevation: 5,170 m (16,960 ft)
- Mouth: Indus River
  - location: Demchok, Ladakh and Dêmqog, Ngari Prefecture
  - coordinates: 32°42′N 79°28′E
  - elevation: 4,200 m (13,800 ft)

Basin features
- River system: Indus River
- Tributaries
  - left: Nilu Nullah

Demchok River
- Chinese: 典角河
- Hanyu Pinyin: Diǎnjiǎo hé
Transcriptions
Standard Mandarin
- Hanyu Pinyin: Diǎnjiǎo hé

The Charding Nullah, traditionally known as the Lhari stream and called Demchok River by China, (Note: On 21 September 1965, the Indian Government wrote to the Chinese Government, complaining of Chinese troops who were said to have "moved forward in strength right up to the Charding Nullah and have assumed a threatening posture at the Indian civilian post on the western [northwestern] side of the Nullah on the Indian side of the 'line of actual control'." The Chinese Government responded on 24 September stating, "In fact, it was Indian troops who on September 18, intruded into the vicinity of the Demchok village on the Chinese side of the 'line of actual control' after crossing the Demchok River from Parigas (in Tibet, China)...") is a small river that originates near the Charding La pass that is also on the border between the two countries and flows northeast to join the Indus River near a peak called "Demchok Karpo" or "Lhari Karpo" (white holy peak of Demchok). There are villages on both sides of the mouth of the river called by the same name "Demchok", which is presumed to have been a single village originally, and has gotten split into two due to geopolitical reasons. The river serves as the de facto border between China and India in the southern part of the Demchok sector.Because of its position near Demchok, the nullah has also become a reference point in discussions of patrol access and border management in eastern Ladakh.

== Etymology ==
The Indian government refers to the river as "Charding Nullah" after its place of origin, the Charding La pass, with nullah meaning a mountain stream.

The Chinese government uses the term "Demchok river" by the location of its mouth, near the Demchok Karpo peak and the Demchok village.

Some of the historical documents call the river "Lhari stream". Lhari, (Note: Alternative spellings of Lahri include "Lahri", "Lari" or "Lairi") meaning "holy mountain" in Tibetan, is a reference to the white rocky peak (4,865 m) behind the Ladakhi Demchok village. It has also been referred to as "Lari Karpo" ("white lhari") and "Demchok Lari Karpo" in Tibetan documents. (Note: Scholars translate the Tibetan term lha-ri as "soul mountain". Many peaks in Tibet are named lhari including a "Demchok lhari" in the northern suburbs of Lhasa. "Karpo", meaning "white", serves to distinguish the Ladakh's mountain peak from the others.)

"Lhari stream at Demchok" is the phrase used in the 1684 Treaty of Tingmosgang, forming the basis for the Indian government's identification of the stream with Charding Nullah. (Note: Fisher et al. states that the Lhari stream flows "five miles southeast of Demchok". This is incorrect. The reference was actually to the Indian alignment of the border, which was five miles southeast of Demchok.) The Indian identification is supported by scholars.

== Geography ==
Charding Nullah

=== Sources ===
The Charding Nullah originates below the Charding La pass, which is on a large spur that divides the Sutlej river basin from the Indus river basin. In this area, the Sutlej river tributaries flow southeast into West Tibet and the Indus river and its tributaries flow northwest, parallel to the Himalayan ranges.

=== Charding–Nilung Nullah Junction ===
The Charding Nullah flows northeast along a narrow mountain valley. Halfway down the valley it is joined by another nullah from the left, called Nilung (or Nilu/Ninglung). The Charding–Nilung Nullah Junction (CNNJ, 4900 m), near Nilding, is recognised by both the Indian and Chinese border troops as a strategic point. Nilung River originates from the Nilun La, which lies west of Charding La. In the Indian administered area are the Lungkar La (5,795 m or 19,012 ft, north of Nilung stream), Jamlung La (west of Nilung stream) and Umling La (5,798 m or 19,024 ft, northwest of Nilung stream), all connected by the BRO Roads from the India side from Chisumle, over these passes and to the left bank of Nilung stream and the left bank of Charding Nullah to Demchok. The right bank of Charding Nullah is administered by China.

=== Changthang plateau ===
The entire area surrounding the Charding Nullah is referred to as the Changthang plateau. It consists of rocky mountain heights of Ladakh and Kailas ranges and sandy river valleys which are only good for grazing yaks, sheep and goats (the famous pashmina goats) reared by Changpa nomads. The Indian-controlled northern side of the nullah is close to Hanle, the site of the Hanle Monastery. The Chinese-controlled southern side has the village of Tashigang (Zhaxigang) which also has a monastery, both having been built by the Ladakhi ruler Sengge Namgyal (r. 1616–1642). At the end of Tibet–Ladakh–Mughal War, the Tibetan troops retreated to Tashigang where they fortified themselves.In the high-altitude terrain of eastern Ladakh, streams, passes and narrow valleys have historically shaped routes of movement, grazing and settlement. The Demchok area, where the Charding Nullah meets the Indus, has therefore had both geographical and frontier significance.

The two villages

=== Mouth ===
At the bottom of the valley, the Charding Nullah branches into a 2 km-wide delta as it joins the Indus river. During the British colonial period, there were villages on both the sides of the delta, going by the name "Demchok". The southern village appears to have been the main one, frequently referred to by travelers.

== Contemporary significance ==
In recent years, Charding Nullah has received renewed attention because of its location in the Demchok sector of eastern Ladakh, one of the friction areas in the India–China border standoff that began in 2020. The stream and the adjoining Charding–Ninglung Nullah area are frequently discussed in relation to patrol access, local border management and the wider strategic importance of the Demchok sector. In October 2024, India and China reached an understanding on patrolling arrangements in Depsang and Demchok, after which disengagement at the remaining friction points was reported to have been completed, subject to verification.

== Sino-Indian border dispute ==
Prior to the Sino-Indian War of 1962, India had established a border post to the south of the delta (called "High Ground"). As the war progressed, the post was evacuated and the Chinese forces occupied it. China has repeatedly attempted to block India's access to Patrol Points (PP) in this area of Demchok sector. The Demchok area has historically been associated with trans-Himalayan movement between Ladakh and western Tibet, before the modern border dispute hardened the area into a sensitive frontier zone.

== See also ==
- India-China border infrastructure

== Bibliography ==
- Gazetteer of Kashmir and Ladak, Calcutta: Superintendent of Government Printing, 1890
- India, Ministry of External Affairs, ed. (1962), Report of the Officials of the Governments of India and the People's Republic of China on the Boundary Question, Government of India Press
  - Indian Report: Part 1 (PDF); Part 2 (PDF); Part 3 (PDF); Part 4 (PDF)
  - Chinese report: Part 1 (PDF); Part 2 (PDF); Part 3 (PDF);
- Ahmad, Zahiruddin (September–December 1968), "New Light on the Tibet-Ladakh-Mughal War of 1679-84", East and West, 18 (3/4), Istituto Italiano per l'Africa e l'Oriente (IsIAO): 340–361, JSTOR 29755343
- Bhattacharji, Romesh (2012), Ladakh: Changing, Yet Unchanged, New Delhi: Rupa Publications – via Academia.edu
- Bray, John (Winter 1990), "The Lapchak Mission From Ladakh to Lhasa in British Indian Foreign Policy", The Tibet Journal, 15 (4): 75–96, JSTOR 43300375
- Cheema, Brig Amar (2015), The Crimson Chinar: The Kashmir Conflict: A Politico Military Perspective, Lancer Publishers, pp. 51–, ISBN 978-81-7062-301-4
- Cunningham, Alexander (1854), Ladak: Physical, Statistical, Historical, London: Wm. H. Allen and Co – via archive.org
- Emmer, Gerhard (2007), "Dga' Ldan Tshe Dbang Dpal Bzang Po and the Tibet-Ladakh-Mughal War of 1679-84", Proceedings of the Tenth Seminar of the IATS, 2003. Volume 9: The Mongolia-Tibet Interface: Opening New Research Terrains in Inner Asia, BRILL, pp. 81–108, ISBN 978-90-474-2171-9
- Fisher, Margaret W.; Rose, Leo E.; Huttenback, Robert A. (1963), Himalayan Battleground: Sino-Indian Rivalry in Ladakh, Praeger – via archive.org
- Handa, O. C. (2001), Buddhist Western Himalaya: A Politico-Religious History, Indus Publishing Company, ISBN 978-81-7387-124-5
- Howard, Neil; Howard, Kath (2014), "Historic Ruins in the Gya Valley, Eastern Ladakh, and a Consideration of Their Relationship to the History of Ladakh and Maryul", in Lo Bue, Erberto; Bray, John (eds.), Art and Architecture in Ladakh: Cross-cultural Transmissions in the Himalayas and Karakoram, BRILL, pp. 68–99, ISBN 9789004271807
- Lamb, Alastair (1964), The China-India border, Oxford University Press
- Lamb, Alastair (1965), "Treaties, Maps and the Western Sector of the Sino-Indian Boundary Dispute" (PDF), The Australian Year Book of International Law: 37–52
- Lamb, Alastair (1989), Tibet, China & India, 1914-1950: a history of imperial diplomacy, Roxford Books, ISBN 978-0-907129-03-5
- Lange, Diana (2017), "Decoding Mid-19th Century Maps of the Border Area between Western Tibet, Ladakh, and Spiti", Revue d'Études Tibétaines, The Spiti Valley Recovering the Past and Exploring the Present
- Maxwell, Neville (1970), India's China War, Pantheon Books, ISBN 978-0-394-47051-1
- Petech, Luciano (1977), The Kingdom of Ladakh, c. 950–1842 A.D. (PDF), Instituto Italiano Per il Medio ed Estremo Oriente – via academia.edu
- Rao, Gondker Narayana (1968), The India-China Border: A Reappraisal, Asia Publishing House
- Woodman, Dorothy (1969), Himalayan Frontiers: A Political Review of British, Chinese, Indian, and Russian Rivalries, Praeger – via archive.org
