= Koyul =

- Village
- Location in Ladakh, India Koyul (India)
- Coordinates: 32.8862°N 79.199°E
- Country: India
- Union Territory: Ladakh
- District: Changthang
- Tehsil: Anlay

Government
  - Sarpanch: Ugrain Chodon

Area
  - Total: 193 ha (480 acres)
- Elevation: 4,660 m (15,290 ft)

Population (2011)
  - Total: 493
  - Density: 255/km^{2} (662/sq mi)

Languages
  - Official: Ladakhi/Bhoti, English
- Time zone: UTC+5:30 (IST)
- 2011 census code: 904

Koyul near the LAC

Koyul is a village in the Changthang district of Ladakh, India. It is located in the Anlay tehsil, on the banks of the Koyul Lungpa river just before it joins the Indus River.

== Geography ==
The village of Koyul is in the Koyul Lungpa valley, which houses an active river that joins the Indus near Fukche. The river originates at the twin passes Zulung La and Dilung La on Ladakh's border with Tibet's Zanda County and flows northeast. Koyul is about 8 km away from the junction with the Indus.

Between the Koyul Lungpa and the Indus valley to the east is a ridge, which also goes by the name "Koyul ridge". China's claim line of the Demchok sector runs along the crest of this ridge. The Koyul village is just beyond the claim line (in undisputed territory), but the claim line cuts the Koyul ridge in half and partially blocks Koyul's access to the Indus valley.

Skakjung pastureland, which runs along the right bank of Indus river from China-administered Dumchele and Tsoskar Lake in south to India-administered Dungti-Loma in north, lies on the right bank of Indus river and north of Koyul.

== Demographics ==
According to the 2011 census of India, Koyul has 115 households. The effective literacy rate (i.e. the literacy rate of population excluding children aged 6 and below) is 64.76%.

Demographics (2011 Census)
	Total	Male	Female
Population	493	236	257
Children aged below 6 years	56	27	29
Scheduled caste	0	0	0
Scheduled tribe	201	99	102
Literates	283	161	122
Workers (all)	209	127	82
Main workers (total)	106	75	31
Main workers: Cultivators	28	21	7
Main workers: Agricultural labourers	0	0	0
Main workers: Household industry workers	2	2	0
Main workers: Other	76	52	24
Marginal workers (total)	103	52	51
Marginal workers: Cultivators	22	10	12
Marginal workers: Agricultural labourers	11	6	5
Marginal workers: Household industry workers	15	7	8
Marginal workers: Others	55	29	26
Non-workers	284	109	175

== Transport ==
- Koyul-Chisumle-Zursar Road (KCZ Road) was completed by December 2023.
- Hanle-Chisumle-Koyul-Fukche-Demchok Road (HKFD Road) was constructed by BRO, which runs via Koyul.
- Likaru-Mig La-Koyul-Fukche Road (LMLF Road), through 19,400 ft Mig La. Likaru, also spelled as Lekaru, is lightly northwest of Hanle on Hanle-Sangrak (military logistics base)-Kiarlakle-Likaru-Pampakarule-Rhongo/Rongoo-Loma-Mood-Nyoma route. Mig La is east-northeast of Likaru.
- Hanle-Photi La-Koyul-Fukche Road (HPLFR)

== Bibliography ==
- Romesh Bhattacharji, Mesmerised in Ladakh, Frontline, 15 January 2011.
- Bhattacharji, Romesh (2012), Ladakh: Changing, yet Unchanged, Rupa Publications India Pvt. Ltd., ISBN 978-81-291-2238-4 – via academia.edu
