= Fukche Advanced Landing Ground =

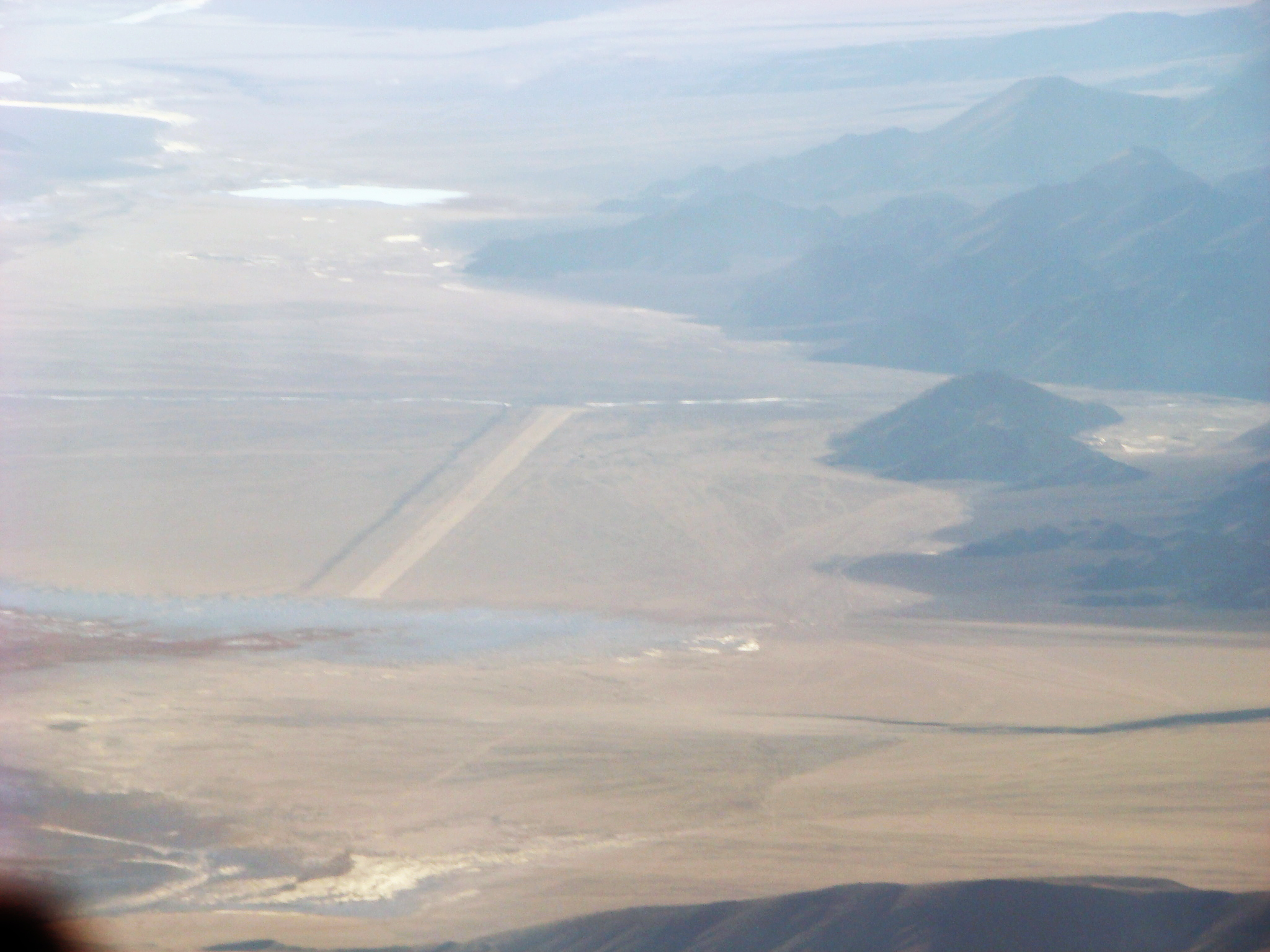
- IATA: none; ICAO: VI66

Summary
- Airport type: Military
- Operator: Indian Air Force
- Location: Ladakh, India
- Elevation AMSL: 13,700 ft (4,200 m)
- Coordinates: 32°56′15″N 79°12′48″E

Map
- Location within Ladakh Location within India

Fukche near the LAC

Fukche Advanced Landing Ground (ICAO: VI66) is an airfield in the Demchok sector of the union territory of Ladakh, India. It was built shortly before the 1962 Sino-Indian War and was revived in 2008. It is located adjacent to Koyul, 34 km northwest of Demchok.

== Geography ==
The Fukche Landing Ground is in the Koyul Lungpa river valley, close to the confluence of the river with the Indus River (called "Sengge Zangbo" locally). The Line of Actual Control (LAC) with China, which runs along the Indus River, is only 2.5 kilometres away. Beyond the LAC is Chinese-controlled Demchok sector up to the Chang La pass (also called Xingong La).

Skakjung pastureland, which runs along the right bank of Indus river from China-administered Dumchele and Tsoskar Lake in south to India-administered Dungti-Loma in north, lies on the right bank of Indus river and north of Koyul.

== History ==
The landing ground was first prepared in 1961 in advance of the 1962 Sino-Indian war. It was the sixth such landing ground to be prepared in Ladakh, starting with Leh in 1948 (which was in the midst of the First Kashmir War). According to a retired Army officer, "The Landing Grounds were built on grounds that were hard, barren and sandwiched between almost a range of parallel running mountains. At most places it was a question of removing boulders, filling potholes and generally leveling the ground. The good old infantry equipment of a pick axe, shovel and crow bar came in very handy."

After the 1962 Sino-Indian war, the airstrip fell out of use. It was reopened on 4 November 2008 by the Indian Air Force, when an AN-32 transport aircraft was successfully landed there. The reactivation of the landing ground, along with another reactivation of the Daulat Beg Oldi airstrip earlier in May of the same year, allows Indian forces to deploy faster and in greater numbers, which China is believed to have taken as a threat. During the 2013 Depsang standoff, China demanded the bunkers being constructed at Fukche be stopped. But the Indians pointed out the constant upgrading of the Chinese infrastructure on their side of the LAC. In the end, the Chinese disengaged at Depsang without insisting on concessions regarding Fukche.

== Transport ==
=== Airfield ===
The military airfield, with no civilian services, has an unpaved gravelly runway of 2 miles length. It accommodates small transport aircraft, meant for inducting or recycling troops at the border.

=== Roads ===
- India
  - "Chushul-Dungti-Fukche-Demchok Highway" (CDFD road), along the southern bank of Indus River which marks the LAC, will be converted to a single-lane 7.45 m wide 135 km long national highway with paved shoulder. Chushul and Fukche Airstrips lie along this highway. It will also provide faster access to the Nyoma airbase. Road will be completed and commission by December 2025 (as of May 2025). Beyond Dungti-Chushul the road connects to Leh in the west and via Hanle to the mainland India.

  - "Hanle-Photi La-Fukche Road" (HPLFR): Photi La (Foti La, not to be confused with Fotu/Photu La on Kargil-Leh Road) is east-southeast of Hanle, this route runs from Hanle and Photi La to Katley-Lekeng Yok-Koyul/Koyl-Fuckhe.

  - "Likaru-Mig La-Fukche Road" (LMLF Road), 64 km long route through 19,400 ft Mig La, commencement of construction was announced by the BRO on 15 August 2023. After the completion in 2025, it overtook the "Chisumle-Demchok Road" (via Umling La, 19,300 ft) as world's highest motorable road. Road via Umling La already passes at a height higher than the base camp of world's tallest mountain, the Mount Everest. Likaru, also spelled as Lekaru, is lightly northwest of Hanle on Hanle-Sangrak (military logistics base)-Kiarlakle-Likaru-Pampakarule-Rhongo/Rongoo-Loma-Mood-Nyoma route. Mig La is east-northeast of Likaru.
- China
  - G219, also called the "Sengge Zangbo Highway", along the Sengge Zangbo River (TIbbetan name of Indus River) adjacent to the LAC.
  - Branch roads from G219 to Pangong Tso, Spanggur Tso, and Dumchele.

== See also ==
- List of Indian ALGs
- India-China military deployment on LAC
- India-China Border Roads

== Bibliography ==
- Gupta, Shishir (2014), The Himalayan Face-Off: Chinese Assertion and the Indian Riposte, Hachette India, ISBN 978-93-5009-606-2
