= Demchok sector =

Disputed region between China and India in Ladakh and Tibet

Parigas district
- Simplified Chinese: 巴里加斯地区
Transcriptions
Standard Mandarin
- Hanyu Pinyin: Bālǐjiāsī dìqū

Demchok relative to Jammu and Kashmir
Demchok relative to Tibet

The Demchok sector (Note: Also called Parigas.) is a disputed area named after the villages of Demchok in Ladakh and Demchok in Tibet, situated near the confluence of the Charding Nullah and Indus River. It is a part of the greater Sino-Indian border dispute between China and India. Both China and India claim the disputed region, with a Line of Actual Control between the two nations situated along the Charding Nullah. (Note: On 21 September 1965, the Indian Government wrote to the Chinese Government, complaining of Chinese troops who were said to have "moved forward in strength right up to the Charding Nullah and have assumed a threatening posture at the Indian civilian post on the western [northwestern] side of the Nullah on the Indian side of the 'line of actual control'." The Chinese Government responded on 24 September stating, "In fact, it was Indian troops who on September 18, intruded into the vicinity of the Demchok village on the Chinese side of the 'line of actual control' after crossing the Demchok River from Parigas (in Tibet, China)...")

The Charding Nullah was mentioned by the name "Lhari stream" in a treaty between the Kingdom of Ladakh and the Ganden Phodrang government of Tibet in 1684 and stated as the boundary between the two regions. British surveys placed the border in 1847 between the princely state of Jammu and Kashmir and Qing Tibet on the stream, while British maps from 1868 onwards placed the border downstream and west of Demchok. After independence in 1947, India claimed the southern watershed of the river (roughly 3 miles southeast of Demchok) as its boundary, which has been contested by the People's Republic of China whose claims coincide with the British maps. The two countries fought a brief war in 1962, after which the Demchok region has remained divided between the two nations across a Line of Actual Control.

== Geography ==
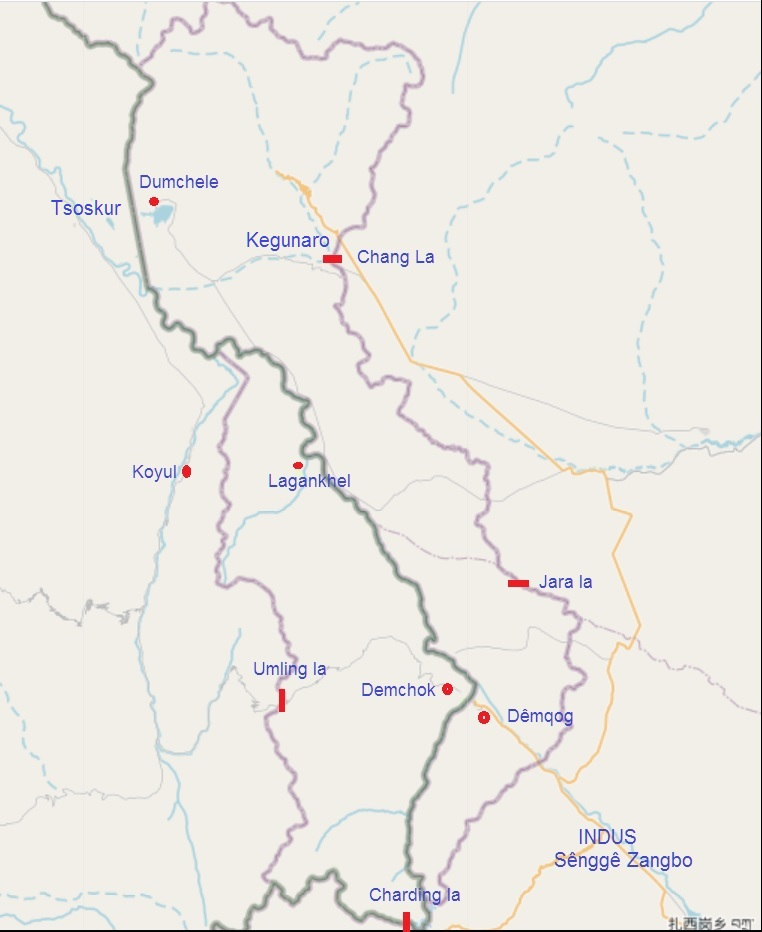
The Demchok sector with China's claim line in the west and India's claim line in the east. The Line of Actual Control, shown in bold, starting from Charding La in south runs along the Charding Nullah and then west along the Indus River to Lagankhel near confluence with the Chibra stream and till confluence near Fukche with the Koyul Lungpa river from Chang La, then heads northwest to the mountain watershed.

At the bottom of the valley, the Charding Nullah branches into a 2 km-wide delta as it joins the Indus River. During the British colonial period, there was a village on both the sides of the delta, going by the name Demchok. The southern village appears to have been the main one, frequently referred to by travellers. The Chinese spell the name of the village as Dêmqog. Travel writer Romesh Bhattacharji stated in 2012 that they expected to set up a trading village, but India never renewed trade after the war. He stated that the southern Dêmqog village has only commercial buildings whereas the northern village has security-related buildings. Both the Indians and the Chinese have track roads going up the valley on the two sides of the Charding Nullah, reaching up to the Charding–Nilung Nullah Junction (CNNJ). Occasional stand-offs between the two forces at CNNJ are reported in the newspapers.

The watershed east of the Koyul Lungpa river, near the village of Koyul, is at the western boundary of the disputed sector, with China's claim line running along the crest of the ridge.

Modern Chinese sources refer to the disputed area around Demchok as Parigas (Chinese: 巴里加斯; pinyin: Bālǐjiāsī) (Note: During discussions in the 1960s, the Chinese government called the Indian village "Parigas" and the Chinese village "Demchok": Report of the Officials, Indian Report, Part 1 (1962). Chinese officials state: "Parigas was part of the Demchok area. West of Demchok, after crossing the Chopu river, one arrived at Parigas."; India. Ministry of External Affairs, ed. (1966), Notes, Memoranda and Letters Exchanged and Agreements Signed Between the Governments of India and China: January 1965 - February 1966, White Paper No. XII (PDF), Ministry of External Affairs – via claudearpi.net: "In fact, it was Indian troops who on September 18, intruded into the vicinity of the Demchok village on the Chinese side of the 'line of actual control' after crossing the Demchok River from Parigas...") or the Parigas region (Chinese: 巴里加斯地区; pinyin: Bālǐjiāsī dìqū). It is apparently named after the Tibetan name Palicasi (Tibetan: པ་ལི་ཅ་སི, Wylie: pa li ca si) of an insignificant camping site that is known to Ladakhis as Silungle. (Note: Silungle is located at 32.768°N 79.359°E on the bank of the Silung stream that joins the Indus river from the left. It is conventional in the Ladakhi language to name camp sites on the streams they are situated on.) Chinese sources describe the disputed territory as having a total area of 1,900 square kilometres (730 sq mi) with India controlling 450 square kilometres (170 sq mi) of its southwest corner, west of Dêmqog and the Indus River.

== History ==
=== Early history ===
The Demchok region was mentioned as being part of the modern kingdom of Ladakh, when it was founded in the 10th century under the name Maryul. King Nyimagon, who founded the West Tibetan kingdom of Ngari Khorsum, divided his kingdom among his three sons upon his death. The eldest son Palgyigon, who is believed to have been the organiser of the Ladakh part of the kingdom, received Ladakh, and the other two sons received Guge–Purang and Zanskar. The description of Maryul in the Ladakh Chronicles mentions Demchok Karpo, the pyramidal white peak behind the Ladakhi Demchok village as one of the landmarks, possibly on its frontier. Other neighbouring landmarks like the Imis Pass ("Yimig rock") and an unidentified place called Raba Dmarpo were also mentioned.

In addition to modern Ladakh, Rudok was also part of Maryul at the time of its formation. Whether it remained affiliated to Ladakh in later times is unknown, but during the reigns of Tsewang Namgyal (r. 1575–1595) and Sengge Namgyal (r. 1616–1642), all the regions of Ngari Khorsum are known to have paid tribute to Ladakh. Sengge Namgyal is credited with building a Drukpa monastery at Tashigang, 30 kilometres (19 mi) southeast of Demchok. He also built the present monasteries of Hemis and Hanle, and the sacred site of Demchok was apparently placed under the former's jurisdiction.

=== Treaty of Tingmosgang (1684) ===
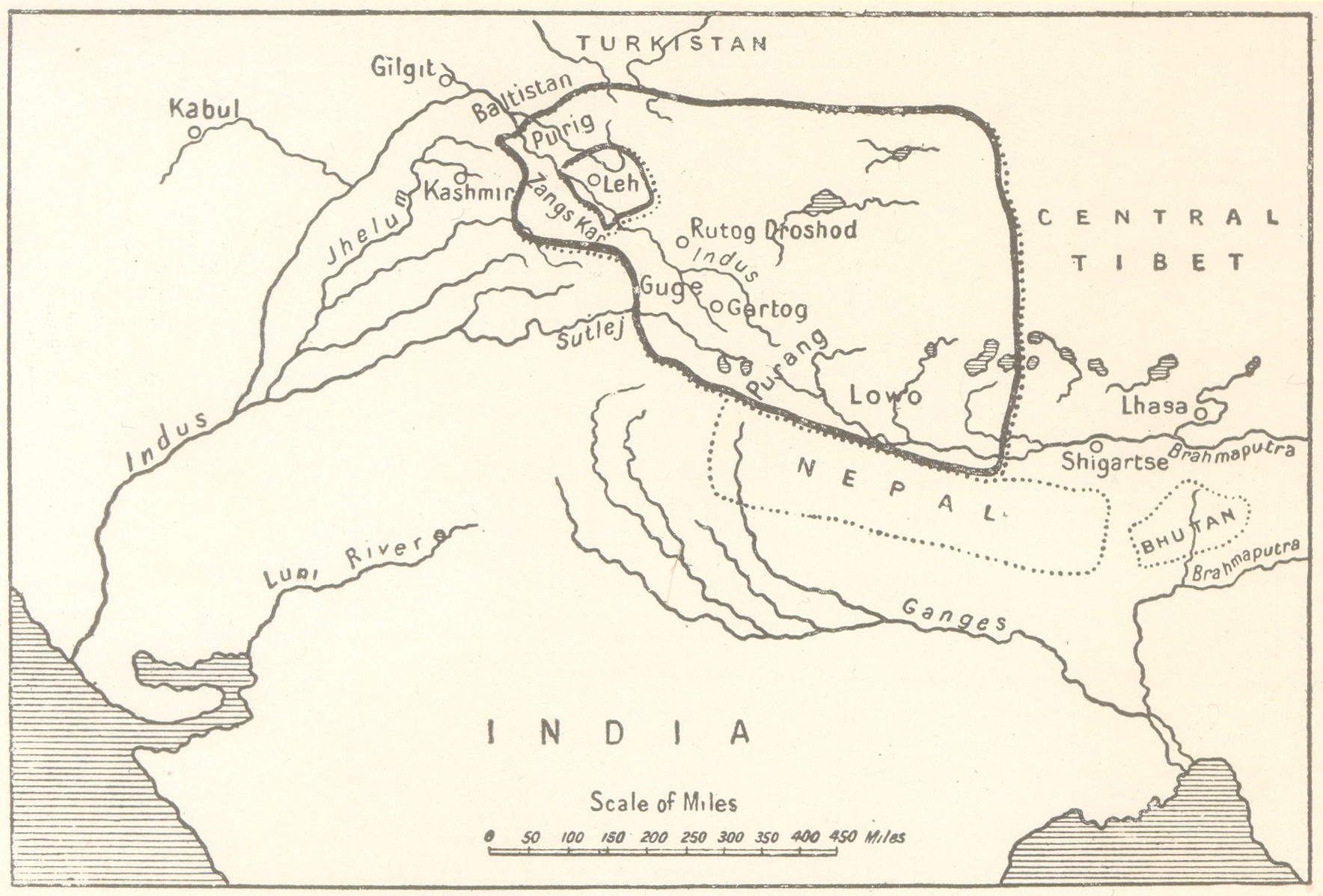
Ladakh's territories prior to the Treaty of Tingmosgang, depicted by August Hermann Francke

The Ladakh Chronicles (La-dvags-rgyal-rabs) mention that, at the conclusion of the Tibet–Ladakh–Mughal War in 1684, Tibet and Ladakh agreed on the Treaty of Tingmosgang, by which the extensive territories in West Tibet (Ngari) previously controlled by Ladakh were removed from its control and the frontier was fixed at the "Lha-ri stream at Demchok". The original text of the Treaty of Tingmosgang is not available to us. The traditional border between the two regions prior to these conflicts is not clearly known.

According to Alexander Cunningham, "A large stone was then set up as a permanent boundary between the two countries, the line of demarcation drawn from the village of Dechhog [Demchok] to the hill of Karbonas [unidentified]."

Roughly 160 years after the Treaty of Tingmosgang, Ladakh came under the rule of the Dogras, who launched an invasion into the West Tibet leading to the Dogra–Tibetan War. The war ended in a stalemate. The resulting Treaty of Chushul in 1842 bound the parties to the "old, established frontiers".

=== British boundary commission (1846–1847) ===
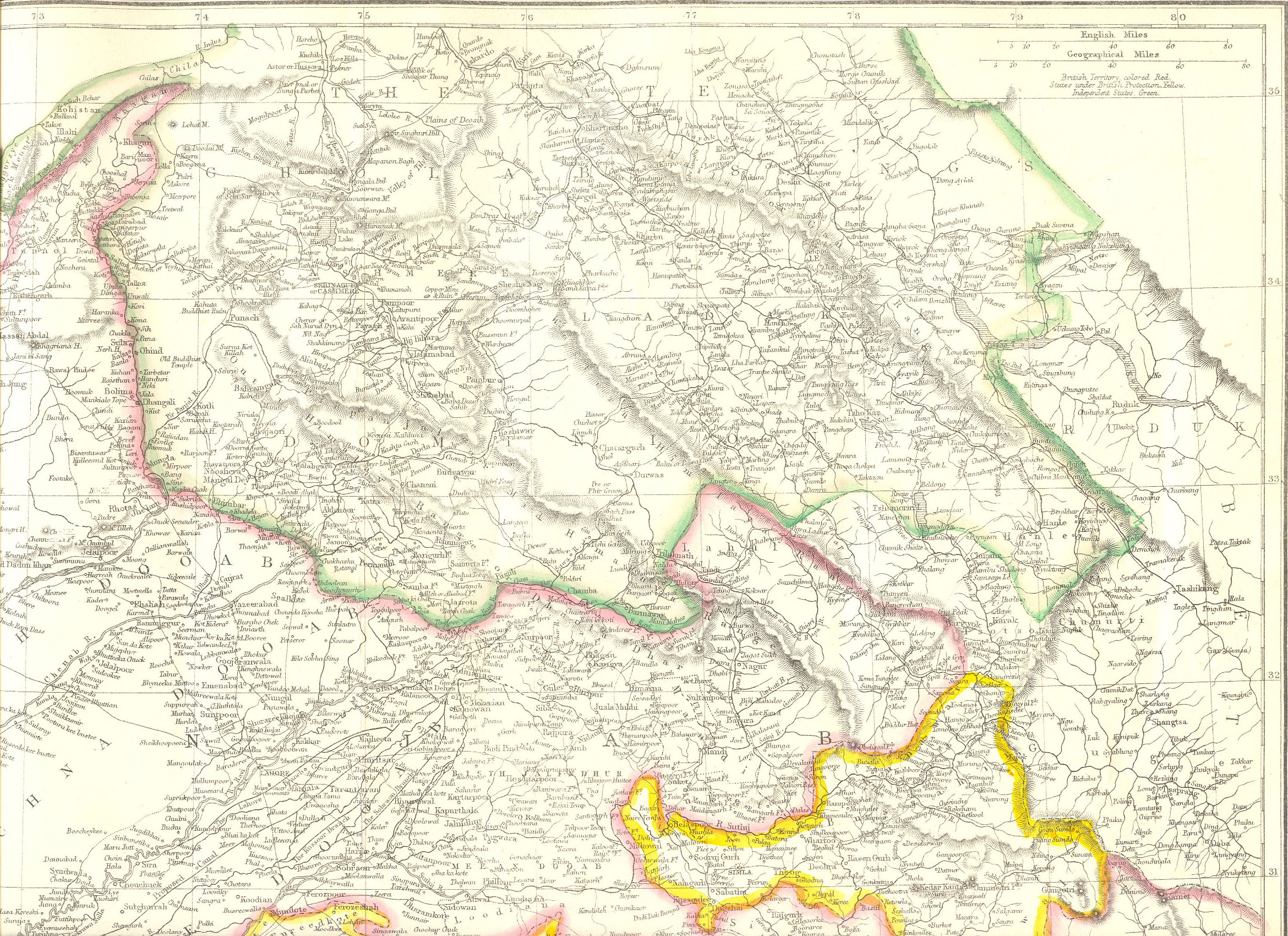
Map of Ladakh, Edward Weller, 1863

After the Dogras joined the British suzerainty as the state of Jammu and Kashmir, the British government dispatched a boundary commission consisting of P. A. Vans Agnew and Alexander Cunningham to define the borders of the state with Tibet in 1846–1847. (Note: Agnew and Cunningham were assisted by Henry Strachey, who later became a notable explorer in his own right. Agnew and Cunningham were told to "bear in mind that, it is not a strip more or less of barren or even productive territory that we want, but a clear and well defined boundary in a quarter likely to come little under observation".) The Chinese government was invited to join the effort for a mutually agreed border. However the Chinese declined, stating that the frontier was well-known and it did not need a new definition. The British boundary commission nevertheless surveyed the area. Its report stated:

[Demchok] is a hamlet of half a dozen huts and tents, not permanently inhabited, divided by a rivulet (entering the left bank of the Indus) which constitutes the boundary of this quarter between Gnari ... [in Tibet] ... and Ladakh.

The "rivulet" is evidently the Charding nullah. The Tibetan frontier guards prohibited the commission from proceeding beyond the rivulet. The commission placed the border on the Indus at Demchok, and followed the mountain watershed of the Indus river on its east, passing through the Jara La and Chang La passes. This appears to be the first time that the watershed principle was used in the Indian subcontinent for defining a boundary. (Note: Cunningham remarked: "In laying down a boundary through mountainous country it appeared to the Commissioners desirable to select such a plan as would completely preclude any possibility of further dispute. This the Commissioners believe they have found in their adoption as a boundary of such mountain ranges as form water-shed lines between the drainages of different rivers.")

=== Kashmir Atlas (1868) ===
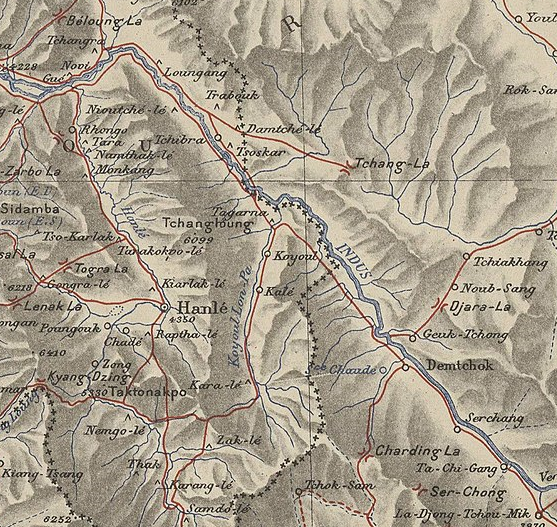
Kashmir Atlas boundary of the Demchok sector (Geographic Service of the French Army, 1909)

Between 1847 and November 1864, the British Indian government conducted the Kashmir Survey (Survey of Kashmir, Ladak, and Baltistan or Little Tibet), whose results were published in a reduced form in the Kashmir Atlas of 1868 by the Great Trigonometrical Survey of India. Even though this was not an official boundary delimitation, the atlas made several adjustments to the boundary, including in the Demchok sector. Lamb states:

Where [Cunningham] had put the boundary actually at Demchok, the Kashmir Atlas (Sheet 17) put it about sixteen miles downstream on the Indus from Demchok, thus coming nearer to the [present] Chinese than the Indian claim line.

It is unclear who decided the altered boundary and on what grounds, given that the survey team leader T. G. Montgomerie was of the view that Demchok was in Ladakh. (Note: While describing the travels of pundit explorers under his employ, Montgomerie writes, "Here they waited for the 3rd Pundit, who joined them on the 29th of September, after having traced the Indus down to Demchok, in Ladak." (emphasis added.) He also notes that the coordinates of Demchok were fixed during the regular survey operations in Ladakh.) Indian commentators blame it on the rudimentary knowledge of the British surveyors about Ladakh — they were ignorant of past treaties as well as revenue records, and mistook pasture disputes as boundary disputes. (Note: Also, the British felt Gulab Singh to be an "expansionist" and distrusted his pleadings.) In contrast, Lamb interprets this as a "compromise" wherein the British gave up territory in Demchok to include other territory near the Spanggur Lake.

=== Later colonial period (1868–1947) ===
Subsequent to the Kashmir Atlas of 1868, there was a flood of British publications on Ladakh. (Note: In 1875, Frederic Drew published his now-seminal Jammoo and Kashmir Territories in 1875 while the text of the Ladakh Chronicles, first discovered by Cunningham in 1847, was published by missionary Karl Marx between 1891 and 1902.) Despite this, no revisions were made to the border at Demchok. According to Lamb, the majority of British maps published between 1918 and 1947 reproduced the Kashmir Atlas, slotting Demchok within Tibet. During the two World Wars, some maps from world powers (including China) showed the same borders.

Independent of the colonial cartography, the traditional boundaries continued to be followed on the ground. The Kashmir government disregarded the British maps and the Tibetan claims to Demchok seem to have persisted. (Note: Claude Arpi narrates the description of a murder inquiry in 1939, conducted by the British Trade Agent in Gartok and the governor of Ladakh (wazir-e-wazarat) jointly with the Tibetan officials (garpons). The Indian officials travelled from Leh to Demchok for this purpose, where they camped at the Lhari stream, described as "a natural boundary between Tibet and Kashmir at Demchok".) Lamb states, "by the time of the Transfer of Power in 1947 nothing had been settled."

=== Modern claims ===
Modern-day Demchok, Ladakh and Dêmqog, Ngari Prefecture

Since the 1950s, Indian maps do not agree entirely with either the 1846–1847 survey or the 1868 Kashmir Atlas: the Indian claims lie 3 miles (4.8 km) east of Demchok, whereas the 1846–1847 British boundary commission placed the border through the middle of Demchok, and British maps from the 1860s onwards showed the border to be 10 miles (16 km) west of Demchok. The Chinese claims coincide with British maps that placed the border 10 miles (16 km) west of Demchok. The Chinese claims also coincided with the borders used by the 1945 National Geographic and 1955 United States Army Map Service maps.

Prior to the Sino-Indian War of 1962, India had established a border post to the south of the delta (the "New Demchok post"). As the war progressed, the post was evacuated and the Chinese forces occupied it. It has also been referred to as "Lari Karpo" ("white lhari") and "Demchok Lari Karpo" in Tibetan documents. (Note: Scholars translate the Tibetan term lha-ri as "soul mountain". Many peaks in Tibet are named lhari including a "Demchok lhari" in the northern suburbs of Lhasa.)

After the 1962 Sino-Indian War, the village of Demchok was divided in two parts, with Demchok, Ladakh administered by India and Dêmqog, Tibet Autonomous Region administered by China. The split did not divide any of the resident families.

Sources vary on whether the larger sector is administered by China or India.

== See also ==
- Aksai Chin
- Chumar
- Skakjung

== Bibliography ==
- Gazetteer of Kashmir and Ladak, Calcutta: Superintendent of Government Printing, 1890
- India, Ministry of External Affairs, ed. (1962), Report of the Officials of the Governments of India and the People's Republic of China on the Boundary Question, Government of India Press
  - Indian Report: Part 1 (PDF); Part 2 (PDF); Part 3 (PDF); Part 4 (PDF)
  - Chinese report: Part 1 (PDF); Part 2 (PDF); Part 3 (PDF);
- Ahmad, Zahiruddin (September–December 1968), "New Light on the Tibet-Ladakh-Mughal War of 1679-84", East and West, 18 (3/4), Istituto Italiano per l'Africa e l'Oriente (IsIAO): 340–361, JSTOR 29755343
- Bhattacharji, Romesh (2012), Ladakh: Changing, Yet Unchanged, New Delhi: Rupa Publications – via Academia.edu
- Bray, John (Winter 1990), "The Lapchak Mission From Ladakh to Lhasa in British Indian Foreign Policy", The Tibet Journal, 15 (4): 75–96, JSTOR 43300375
- Cheema, Brig Amar (2015), The Crimson Chinar: The Kashmir Conflict: A Politico Military Perspective, Lancer Publishers, pp. 51–, ISBN 978-81-7062-301-4
- Cunningham, Alexander (1854), Ladak: Physical, Statistical, Historical, London: Wm. H. Allen and Co – via archive.org
- Emmer, Gerhard (2007), "Dga' Ldan Tshe Dbang Dpal Bzang Po and the Tibet-Ladakh-Mughal War of 1679-84", Proceedings of the Tenth Seminar of the IATS, 2003. Volume 9: The Mongolia-Tibet Interface: Opening New Research Terrains in Inner Asia, BRILL, pp. 81–108, ISBN 978-90-474-2171-9
- Fisher, Margaret W.; Rose, Leo E.; Huttenback, Robert A. (1963), Himalayan Battleground: Sino-Indian Rivalry in Ladakh, Praeger – via archive.org
- Francke, August Hermann (1926), Thomas, F. W. (ed.), Antiquities of Indian Tibet, Part (Volume) II
- Handa, O. C. (2001), Buddhist Western Himalaya: A Politico-Religious History, Indus Publishing Company, ISBN 978-81-7387-124-5
- Howard, Neil; Howard, Kath (2014), "Historic Ruins in the Gya Valley, Eastern Ladakh, and a Consideration of Their Relationship to the History of Ladakh and Maryul", in Lo Bue, Erberto; Bray, John (eds.), Art and Architecture in Ladakh: Cross-cultural Transmissions in the Himalayas and Karakoram, BRILL, pp. 68–99, ISBN 9789004271807
- Lamb, Alastair (1964), "The China-India border", The Geographical Journal, 130 (2), Oxford University Press: 273, Bibcode:1964GeogJ.130..273C, doi:10.2307/1794592, JSTOR 1794592 – via archive.org
- Lamb, Alastair (1965), "Treaties, Maps and the Western Sector of the Sino-Indian Boundary Dispute" (PDF), The Australian Year Book of International Law: 37–52
- Lamb, Alastair (1989), Tibet, China & India, 1914-1950: a history of imperial diplomacy, Roxford Books, ISBN 9780907129035
- Lange, Diana (2017), "Decoding Mid-19th Century Maps of the Border Area between Western Tibet, Ladakh, and Spiti", Revue d'Études Tibétaines, The Spiti Valley Recovering the Past and Exploring the Present
- Jinpa, Nawang (Autumn–Winter 2015), "Why Did Tibet and Ladakh Clash in the 17th Century? – Rethinking the Background to the 'Mongol War' in Ngari (1679-1684)", The Tibet Journal, 40 (2): 113–150, JSTOR tibetjournal.40.2.113
- Maxwell, Neville (1970), India's China War, Pantheon Books, ISBN 978-0-394-47051-1
- Montgomerie, T. G. (1869), "Report of the Trans-Himalayan Explorations during 1867", The Journal of the Royal Geographical Society, 39, Murray: 146–, doi:10.2307/1798550, JSTOR 1798550
- Petech, Luciano (1977), The Kingdom of Ladakh, c. 950–1842 A.D., Instituto Italiano Per il Medio ed Estremo Oriente – via archive.org
- Rao, Gondker Narayana (1968), The India-China Border: A Reappraisal, Asia Publishing House
- Woodman, Dorothy (1969), Himalayan Frontiers: A Political Review of British, Chinese, Indian, and Russian Rivalries, Praeger – via archive.org
