= Mig La =

Mountain pass in Jammu and Kashmir

Mig La pass
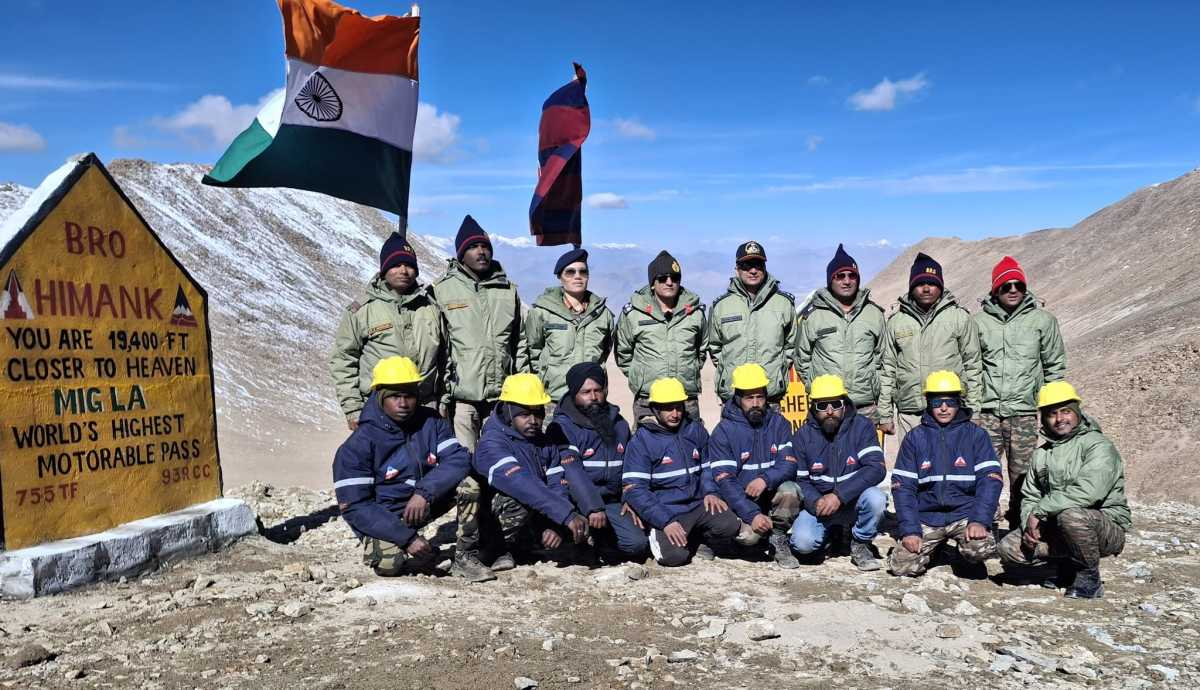
- Interactive map of Mig La pass
- Elevation: 19,400 ft (5,913 m)

Location
- Location: Leh district, Ladakh, India
- Range: Changthang Plateau, Himalayas
- Coordinates: 32°54′34″N 79°04′00″E

Mig La (also known as Mig Pass) is a high-altitude mountain pass located in the Changthang Plateau of Ladakh, India. The pass is notable for being the location of the world's highest motorable road, constructed by the Border Roads Organisation (BRO). Mig La is situated in the Leh district near the Line of Actual Control (LAC) with China.

The completion of the road over Mig La Pass has significant strategic and socio-economic importance for India. It enhances connectivity for the Indian Armed Forces in the eastern Ladakh sector and provides year-round access to remote border villages.

== Geography ==
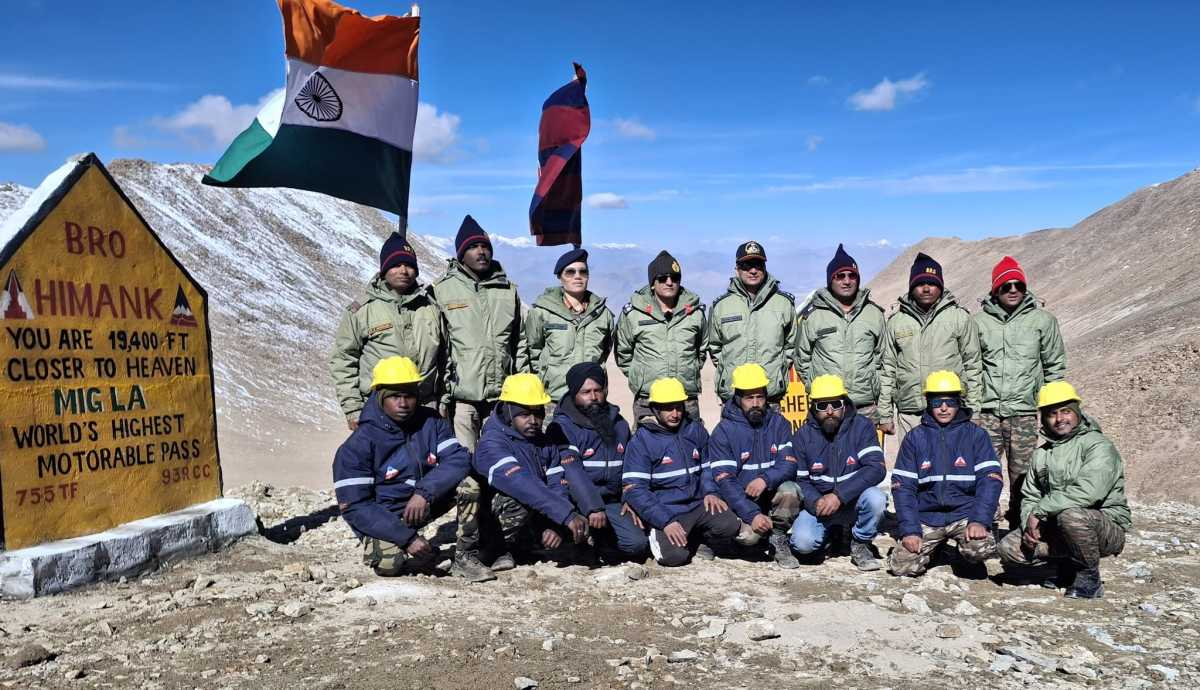
Mig La Pass

=== Elevation ===
Mig La is situated in the rugged, high-altitude terrain of the Changthang Plateau in eastern Ladakh. The pass is located in the Leh district of the union territory of Ladakh.

=== World record ===
BRO's achievement of constructing LMLF Road over the Mig La, announced by hoisting the Indian tricolour and the BRO flag at the summit, broke its previous Guinness World Record for the highest motorable road.

The road built over Mig La Pass is officially located at an altitude of 19,400 feet (5,913 metres) above sea level. This elevation makes the road at Mig La the world's highest motorable road, surpassing the Border Roads Organisation's own previous record at the nearby Umling La Pass (19,024 feet). The altitude of Mig La is higher than both the South Base Camp of Mount Everest in Nepal (17,598 feet) and the North Base Camp in Tibet (16,900 feet). The BRO is responsible for the development and maintenance of road networks in India's border areas. Construction on the road began in August 2023 and the critical section was completed in October 2025, overcoming significant engineering challenges posed by the extreme altitude and weather.

=== Significance ===
This alignment creates a third axis for military mobility from the Hanle sector to Fukche.. This strategic road over the Mig La pass was constructed by the Border Roads Organisation (BRO) under Project Himank.

== Climate ==
The terrain at Mig La is characterised by the cold desert climate with extreme conditions, including sub-zero temperatures and oxygen levels that are nearly 50 per cent lower than at sea level. These geographical challenges, such as loose soil and intense cold, made the road construction project difficult.

== Transport ==
Likaru–Mig La–Fukche Road (LMLF Road) over the Mig La is part of the 64-kilometre-long alignment which connects the Likaru village (in Hanley region) to the Fukche Advanced Landing Ground airfield located only about three kilometres from the Line of Actual Control (LAC) with China.

== Tourism ==
The LMLF Road is expected to boost tourism in Ladakh, while also providing year-round connectivity and socio-economic benefits to remote border communities like Hanle and Fukche.

== See also ==
- Umling La
- Khardung La
- Chang La
- India–China Border Roads
