= Demchok, Ngari Prefecture =

Demchok བདེ་མཆོག, 典角村 Dêmqog
- Village
- Location within Tibet Location within China
- Coordinates: 32°41′40″N 79°27′45″E
- Country: China
- Region: Tibet
- Prefecture: Ngari Prefecture
- County: Gar County
- Township: Zhaxigang
- Elevation: 4,240 m (13,910 ft)

Population (2019)
  - Total: 171

Demchok

Chinese name
- Chinese: 典角村
- Hanyu Pinyin: Diǎnjiǎocūn
- Literal meaning: "Demchok Village"
Transcriptions
Standard Mandarin
- Hanyu Pinyin: Diǎnjiǎocūn

Tibetan name
- Tibetan: བདེ་མཆོག
Transcriptions
- Wylie: bde mchog
- THL: dem chok
- Tibetan Pinyin: dêmqog

Demchok (Note: Variant spellings include Demchog, Demjok, and Dechhog.) (Tibetan: བདེ་མཆོག, Wylie: bde mchog, THL: dem chok, ZWPY: dêmqog), is a Chinese-administered village in the Zhaxigang Township, Ngari Prefecture in the Tibet Autonomous Region of China. India disputes the status and claims it as part of the Demchok sector that it regards as part of Ladakh.

== Geography ==
Demchok and vicinity

Demchok is located on the west bank of the Indus, roughly 30 km from Tashigang (Zhaxigang), at an elevation of over 4,000m. It is at the mouth of the Demchok River (also called "Charding Nullah" and "Lhari stream"), based in its alluvial plain.

The Line of Actual Control (LAC) passes along the northwest side of the village, following the Demchok River upstream till its source Charding La. The Indian-administered village of Demchok, Ladakh is roughly 600m away, across the stream. The Indian-claimed border extends 3 miles (4.8 km) southeast of Demchok, while the Chinese-claimed border extends 10 miles (16 km) northwest of Demchok.

== History ==
=== 17th to 19th centuries ===
The village of Demchok was mentioned in the Chronicles of Ladakh as the boundary point between Tibet and Ladakh demarcated in the 1684 Treaty of Tingmosgang.

When Henry Strachey visited the area in 1847, he described Demchok as a single hamlet with settlements on both the sides of the Lhari stream and the stream as the prevailing border between Ladakh and Tibet. A governor (wazir-e-wazarat) of Ladakh visited the area in 1904–05 and found the Tibetan Demchok village housing 8 to 9 huts of zamindars (landholders) while the Ladakhi Demchok village had only two zamindars. When Sven Hedin visited the area in the November 1907, he described Demchok as four or five huts lying on the southeastern bank of the Lhari stream in Tibet, with the Ladakhi side of the Lhari stream only containing the pyramidal Lhari peak and the ruins of two or three houses.

=== 1950s and 1960s ===
In 1951, the People's Republic of China brought Tibet under its control. In 1954, India and China held negotiations for adjusting the trade relations between India and Tibet in the light of the new political context. During the negotiations, China offered Demchok as the location for a trade mart. (Note: China refused the traditional trade routes between Ladakh and Rudok, but it was happy to allow trade along the Tashigong route.) India objected, claiming that Demchok was within Indian territory. The Chinese negotiator replied, "there can be no doubt about actual physical possession, which can be verified on spot, but to avoid any dispute we may omit mention of Demchok". The final agreement carried the wording, "the customary route leading to Tashigong along the valley of the Indus River may continue to be traversed."

Later in 1954, India published maps of its territory with defined borders, in which Demchok was claimed as Indian territory, border being set 3 miles (4.8 km) southeast of Demchok. In contrast, China has held that the border was some 10 miles west along the Indus Valley in line with the old British maps. In October 1955, China established a Border Working Group in the Demchok village.

The year 1959 witnessed an uprising in Lhasa and the Dalai Lama went into exile in India. China launched an "Anti-Rebellion Campaign" following this, subjecting Tibetans to forceful reforms and causing those living in border regions to flee to India. By the time the "turmoil" ended, there were only three households left in Demchok.

In the wake of rising border tensions in 1962, India established border outposts in its claimed territory. There was a post called "High Ground" above the Demchok village in the Charding Nullah valley, and another called "International Border Post" at India's claimed border point in the Indus Valley. Once the war began in October 1962, these posts were either overrun by the People's Liberation Army (PLA) or they were quickly withdrawn. The PLA advanced to China's claim line before withdrawing to their original locations. The Line of Actual Control resulting from the war runs along the Charding Nullah to the west of Demchok village.

=== 1980 onwards ===
In 1984, committees from the Tibet Autonomous Region, Ngari Prefecture, and Gar County governments selected 24 people from 5 households to move to Demchok from the Jiamu Village, 100 km away in the Shiquanhe township. After a year, two households returned to Jiamu because they found it hard to endure the border lifestyle. In 1990, 9 more households were selected from Jiamu Village to move to Demchok, and there were a total of 15 households in Demchok divided into two working groups. The residents that moved to Demchok were communist party members, who were committed to guarding the border.

With 15 households, Demchok was administratively established as a village in 1990. Between 1999 and 2008, an international border trade market operated here, perhaps unofficially. Chinese daily necessities were exchanged for Indian handicrafts. This seems to have come to an end with the entry of PLA to the region. Indian explorer Romesh Bhattacharji, who visited the area sometime after this, noticed a yellow windowless building, which was "optimistically" built by China to serve as a border market but was not operational.

In 2008, the PLA established a post at Demchok on the grounds of security for Beijing Olympics. Soon after this, border intrusions were reported on the Indian side, along with a serious incident where the PLA is said to have assumed firing positions to chase away the Indian Intelligence Bureau personnel from the Charding–Nilung Nullah Junction (on the Indian side of the border). Border incidents at Demchok have become endemic ever since.

From 2011 to 2018, the Gar County government invested more than CN¥42 million on facilities and rebuilding the local residences. The construction of the two-storey single-family villas, which replaced the previous low-rise adobe houses, was completed in 2018.

In 2017, Demchok was named a National Civilized Village by the Central Guidance Commission on Building Spiritual Civilization.

== Demographics ==
In 2019, there were 171 people living in 51 households in Demchok. In 2015, the per capita income was CN¥8,234. The primary and secondary school enrollment rate for school-age children was 98%.

== Economy ==
The local economy of Demchok is largely based on cattle and sheep grazing. Residents of Demchok receive government subsidies for living in a border region and for living in grasslands.

Before 2011, Demchok lacked electricity and running water. By 2017, the village was completely electrified by two photovoltaic power stations and had water pumped from two newly drilled wells. The village also has full cellular network coverage, contains 2 public toilets, and has a landfill.

== See also ==
- List of towns and villages in Tibet

== Bibliography ==
- India, Ministry of External Affairs (1962), Report of the Officials of the Governments of India and the People's Republic of China on the Boundary Question, Government of India Press
  - Indian Report: Part 1 (PDF); Part 2 (PDF); Part 3 (PDF); Part 4 (PDF)
- Francke, August Hermann (1926). Antiquities of Indian Tibet, Part 2. Calcutta: Superintendent Government Printing – via archive.org.
- Hedin, Sven (1922), Southern Tibet: Discoveries in Former Times Compared with My Own Researches in 1906–1908: Vol. IV – Kara-korum and Chang-Tang, Stockholm: Lithographic Institute of the General Staff of the Swedish Army
- Lamb, Alastair (1964), The China-India border, Oxford University Press
- Lamb, Alastair (1965). "Treaties, Maps and the Western Sector of the Sino-Indian Boundary Dispute" (PDF). The Australian Year Book of International Law. 1 (1): 37–52. doi:10.1163/26660229-001-01-900000005.
- Lange, Diana (2017), "Decoding Mid-19th Century Maps of the Border Area between Western Tibet, Ladakh, and Spiti", Revue d'Études Tibétaines, The Spiti Valley Recovering the Past and Exploring the Present
- Sandhu, P. J. S.; Shankar, Vinay; Dwivedi, G. G. (2015), 1962: A View from the Other Side of the Hill, Vij Books India Pvt Ltd, ISBN 978-93-84464-37-0
