= Demchok (historical village) =

Historical village between Ladakh and Tibet

Demchok བདེ་མཆོག
- Village
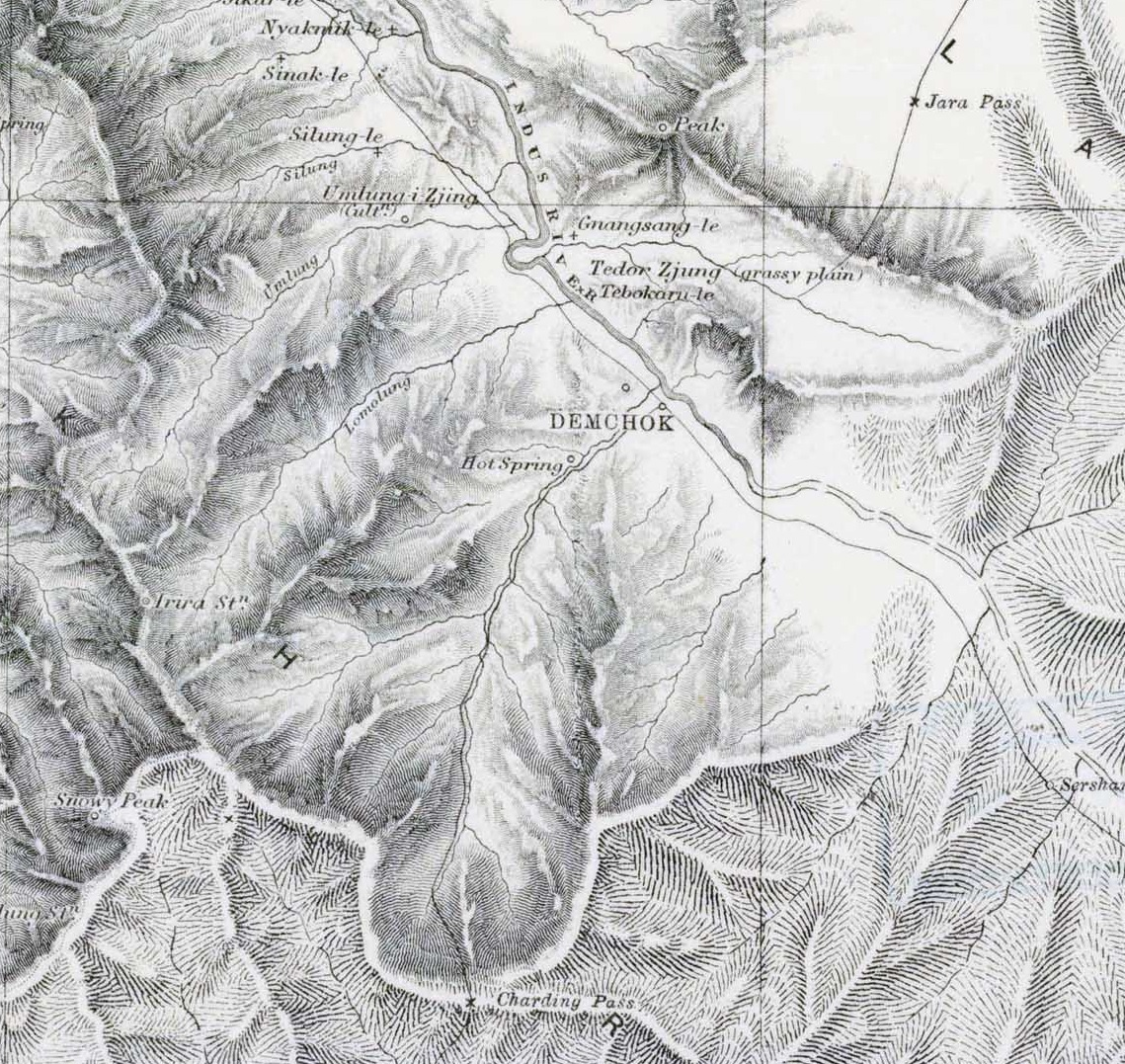
- Demchok depicted in a Survey of India map of 1874

- Location within Ladakh Location within Tibet
- Coordinates: 32°42′00″N 79°27′30″E
- Elevation: 4,220 m (13,850 ft)

Languages

Demchok (Tibetan: ཌེམ་ཆོག, Wylie: bde mchog, THL: dem chok, ZWPY: dêmqog), (Note: For the traditional spelling see Francke, Antiquities of Indian Tibet, Part 2 (1926), pp. 115–116. Variant spellings include Demchog, Demjok, and Dechhog.) was described by a British boundary commission in 1847 as a village lying on the border between the Kingdom of Ladakh and the Tibet. It was a "hamlet of half a dozen huts and tents", divided into two parts by a rivulet which formed the boundary between the two states. The rivulet, a tributary of the Indus River variously called the Demchok River, Charding Nullah, or the Lhari stream, was set as the boundary between Ladakh and Tibet in the 1684 Treaty of Tingmosgang. By 1904–05, the Tibetan side of the hamlet was said to have had 8 to 9 huts of zamindars (landholders), while the Ladakhi side had two. The area of the former Demchok now straddles the Line of Actual Control, the effective border of the People's Republic of China's Tibet Autonomous Region and the Republic of India's Ladakh Union Territory.

== Name ==
The village of Demchok was apparently named after Demchok Karpo, the rocky white peak behind the present Ladakhi village of Demchok. However, prior to 1947, the main Demchok village was on the Tibetan side of the border. The Ladakhi side of the settlement was still referred to as "Demchok".

Chinese officials use the name "Demchok" only for the Tibetan side of the settlement and refer to the Ladakhi side as "Parigas" (also spelt "Barrigas").

== History ==
Demchok and vicinity

Demchok is a historic area of Ladakh, having been part of the kingdom from its inception in the 10th century. The description of the kingdom in the Ladakh Chronicles mentions Demchok Karpo, also called Demchok Lhari Karpo or Lhari Karpo, as being part of the original kingdom. This is a possible reference to the rocky white peak behind the Ladakhi side of the Demchok village. (Note: Scholars translate the Tibetan term lha-ri as "soul mountain". Many peaks in Tibet are named lhari including a "Demchok lhari" in the northern suburbs of Lhasa. "Karpo", meaning "white", serves to distinguish the Ladakh's mountain peak from the others.) The Lhari peak is held sacred by Buddhists. Demchok (Sanskrit: Cakrasaṃvara) is the name of a Buddhist Tantric deity, who is believed to reside on the Mount Kailas, and whose imagery parallels that of Shiva in Hinduism. The Lhari peak is also referred to as "Chota Kailas" (mini Kailas) and attracts pilgrimage from Hindus as well as Buddhists. Tibetologist Nirmal C. Sinha states that Demchok is part of the Hemis complex. Ruined houses belonging to the Hemis monastery were noticed by Sven Hedin in 1907, and the monastery continues to own land in Demchok. Demchok was a stopping point on historic routes from Ladakh towards Mount Kailash and Lake Manasarovar. Traders and pilgrims travelled along these routes, which local pastoral communities also used. The settlement therefore formed part of a network supporting trade, pilgrimage and everyday movement across the region.

=== 17th century ===
The Chronicles of Ladakh mention that, at the conclusion of the Tibet–Ladakh–Mughal War in 1684, the Prime Minister Desi Sangye Gyatso of Ganden Phodrang Tibet and the King of Ladakh Delek Namgyal agreed on the Treaty of Tingmosgang. The chronicles describe the treaty as fixing the boundary at "the Lhari stream at Demchok".

According to Alexander Cunningham, "A large stone was then set up as a permanent boundary between the two countries, the line of demarcation drawn from the village of Dechhog [Demchok] to the hill of Karbonas."

=== British colonial era ===
British boundary commissioner Henry Strachey visited Demchok in 1847 on the borders of the former princely state of Jammu and Kashmir. He described the village as:

[Demchok] is a hamlet of half a dozen huts and tents, not permanently inhabited, divided by a rivulet (entering the left bank of the Indus) which constitutes the boundary of this quarter between Gnari ... [in Tibet] ... and Ladakh.

The boundary commission determined that the border between the Kashmir and Tibet was at Demchok.

The Survey of Kashmir, Ladak, and Baltistan or Little Tibet of 1847 to 1868 under the Great Trigonometrical Survey of India then made several adjustments to the boundary, described by Alastair Lamb as moving "sixteen miles downstream on the Indus from Demchok". However, Indian commentators state that the revenue records from the period of the survey show that the Demchok area was administered by Ladakh.

In 1904–05, a tour report by the Wazir Wazarat (Governor) of Ladakh described the Tibetan side of the hamlet to have 8 to 9 huts of zamindars (landholders) and described the Ladakhi side as having two. When Sven Hedin visited the area in the November 1907, he described Demchok as four or five huts lying on the southeastern bank of the Lhari stream in Tibet, with the Ladakhi side of the Lhari stream only containing the pyramidal Lhari peak and the ruins of two or three houses.

== Modern era ==
=== Chinese-administered village ===
The Chinese-administered village of Dêmqog lies on the southeast bank of the Charding Nullah and LAC. Before 1984, only 3 households were living in Dêmqog. Since 1984, the local governments have encouraged people to move to Dêmqog from surrounding areas. Dêmqog was officially established as an administrative village in 1990 and had a population of 171 people from 51 households in 2019.

=== Indian-administered village ===
The Indian-administered village of Demchok lies on the north-west bank of the Charding Nullah and LAC. According to the 2011 Census of India, the village had a population of 78 people from 31 households. In 2019, the village had a population of 69 people.

== See also ==
- India-China Border Roads
- List of disputed territories of India
- List of towns and villages in Tibet
- Sino-Indian border dispute

== Bibliography ==
- India, Ministry of External Affairs, ed. (1962), Report of the Officials of the Governments of India and the People's Republic of China on the Boundary Question, Government of India Press
  - Indian Report: Part 1 (PDF); Part 2 (PDF); Part 3 (PDF); Part 4 (PDF)
  - Chinese report: Part 1 (PDF); Part 2 (PDF); Part 3 (PDF);
- Ahmad, Zahiruddin (1968). "New Light on the Tibet-Ladakh-Mughal War of 1679—1684". East and West. 18 (3/4): 340–361. JSTOR 29755343.
- Arpi, Claude (December 2016) [abridged version published in Indian Defence Review, 19 May 2017], The Case of Demchok (PDF)
- Bhattacharji, Romesh (2012), Ladakh: Changing, Yet Unchanged, New Delhi: Rupa Publications – via Academia.edu
- Bray, John (Winter 1990), "The Lapchak Mission From Ladakh to Lhasa in British Indian Foreign Policy", The Tibet Journal, 15 (4): 75–96, JSTOR 43300375
- Cheema, Brig Amar (2015), The Crimson Chinar: The Kashmir Conflict: A Politico Military Perspective, Lancer Publishers, ISBN 978-81-7062-301-4
- Cunningham, Alexander (1854), Ladak: Physical, Statistical, Historical, London: Wm. H. Allen and Co – via archive.org
- Francke, August Hermann (1926). Antiquities of Indian Tibet, Part 2. Calcutta: Superintendent Government Printing – via archive.org.
- Emmer, Gerhard (2007), "Dga' Ldan Tshe Dbang Dpal Bzang Po and the Tibet-Ladakh-Mughal War of 1679-84", Proceedings of the Tenth Seminar of the IATS, 2003. Volume 9: The Mongolia-Tibet Interface: Opening New Research Terrains in Inner Asia, BRILL, pp. 81–108, ISBN 978-90-474-2171-9
- Fisher, Margaret W.; Rose, Leo E.; Huttenback, Robert A. (1963), Himalayan Battleground: Sino-Indian Rivalry in Ladakh, Praeger – via archive.org
- Handa, O. C. (2001), Buddhist Western Himalaya: A Politico-Religious History, Indus Publishing Company, ISBN 978-81-7387-124-5
- Hedin, Sven (1922), Southern Tibet: Discoveries in Former Times Compared with My Own Researches in 1906–1908: Vol. IV – Kara-korum and Chang-Tang, Stockholm: Lithographic Institute of the General Staff of the Swedish Army
- Howard, Neil; Howard, Kath (2014), "Historic Ruins in the Gya Valley, Eastern Ladakh, and a Consideration of Their Relationship to the History of Ladakh and Maryul", in Erberto Lo Bue; John Bray (eds.), Art and Architecture in Ladakh: Cross-cultural Transmissions in the Himalayas and Karakoram, BRILL, pp. 68–99, ISBN 978-90-04-27180-7
- Lamb, Alastair (1964), The China-India border, Oxford University Press
- Lamb, Alastair (1965), "Treaties, Maps and the Western Sector of the Sino-Indian Boundary Dispute" (PDF), The Australian Year Book of International Law: 37–52, doi:10.1163/26660229-001-01-900000005
- Lamb, Alastair (1989), Tibet, China & India, 1914-1950: a history of imperial diplomacy, Roxford Books, ISBN 9780907129035
- Lange, Diana (2017), "Decoding Mid-19th Century Maps of the Border Area between Western Tibet, Ladakh, and Spiti", Revue d'Études Tibétaines, The Spiti Valley Recovering the Past and Exploring the Present
- McKay, Alex (2015), Kailas Histories: Renunciate Traditions and the Construction of Himalayan Sacred Geography, BRILL, ISBN 978-90-04-30618-9
- Maxwell, Neville (1970), India's China War, Pantheon Books, ISBN 978-0-394-47051-1 – via archive.org
- Petech, Luciano (1977), The Kingdom of Ladakh, c. 950–1842 A.D. (PDF), Instituto Italiano Per il Medio ed Estremo Oriente – via academia.edu
- Rao, Gondker Narayana (1968), The India-China Border: A Reappraisal, Asia Publishing House
- Woodman, Dorothy (1969), Himalayan Frontiers: A Political Review of British, Chinese, Indian, and Russian Rivalries, Praeger – via archive.org
