= Demchok, Ladakh =

Demchok བདེ་མཆོག Demjok
- Town
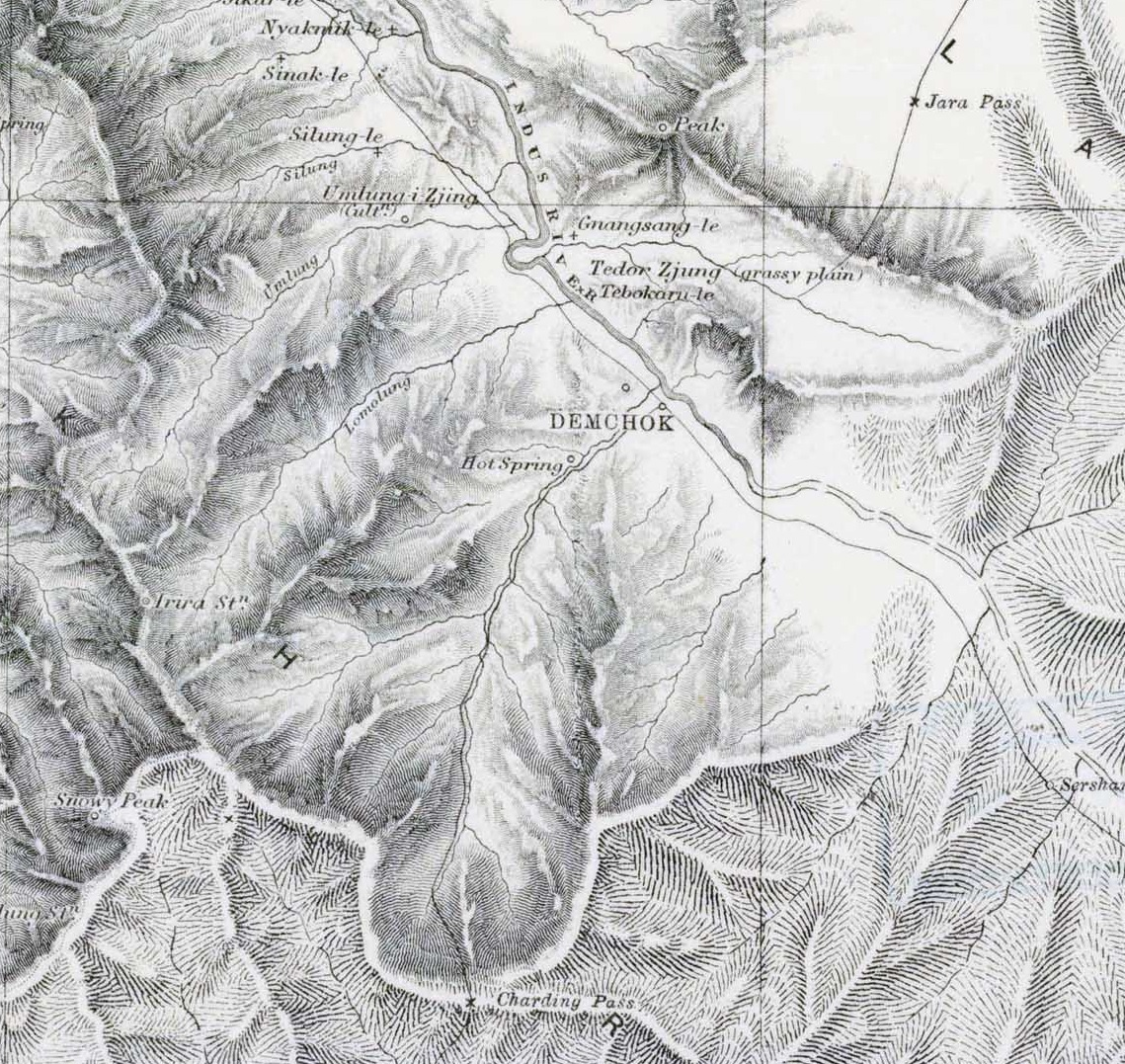

- Location in Ladakh, India Demchok (India)
- Coordinates: 32°42′14″N 79°26′48″E
- Country: India
- Union Territory: Ladakh
- District: Changthang
- Tehsil: Anlay
- Panchayat: Koyul

Government
  - Sarpanch: Ugrain Chodon

Area
  - Total: 33 ha (82 acres)
- Elevation: 4,200 m (13,800 ft)

Population (2011)
  - Total: 78
  - Density: 240/km^{2} (610/sq mi)

Languages
  - Official: Ladakhi, Hindi, English
- Time zone: UTC+5:30 (IST)
- Census code: 906

Demchok (also spelt Demjok) (Note: Variant spellings include Demchog, , and Dechhog.) (Tibetan: ཌེམ་ཆོག, Wylie: bde mchog, THL: dem chok), previously called New Demchok, and called Parigas (Chinese: 巴里加斯; pinyin: Bālǐ jiā sī) by the Chinese, (Note: Modern Chinese sources use 巴里加斯 (Parigas, pinyin: bālǐjiāsī) to refer to a broader area and use 碟木绰克 (pinyin: diémùchuòkè) to refer to the village of Demchok. See Demchok sector.) is a Town and military encampment in the Indian-administered Demchok sector, that is disputed between India and China. It is administered as part of the Anlay tehsil in the Changthang district of Ladakh by India, and claimed by China as part of the Tibet Autonomous Region.

The Line of Actual Control (LAC) passes along the southeast side of the village, along the Charding Nullah (also called Demchok River and Lhari stream) which joins the Indus River near the village. Across the stream, less than a kilometre away, is a Chinese-administered Demchok village.

== Etymology ==
Demchok and vicinity

The village of Demchok was apparently named after Demchok Karpo (also "Demchok Lhari Karpo"), the rocky white peak behind the present Ladakhi village of Demchok. However, prior to 1947, the main Demchok village was on the Tibetan side of the border. The Ladakhi side of the settlement was still referred to as "Demchok".

Chinese officials use the name "Demchok" only for the Tibetan side of the settlement and refer to the Ladakhi side as "Parigas" (also spelt "Barrigas"). This is apparently derived from a Tibetan name Palichasi (Tibetan: པ་ལི་ཅ་སི, Wylie: pa li ca si, THL: pa li cha si), of a pastoral ground known to Ladakhis as Silungle, roughly halfway downstream to Lagankhel.

== Geography ==
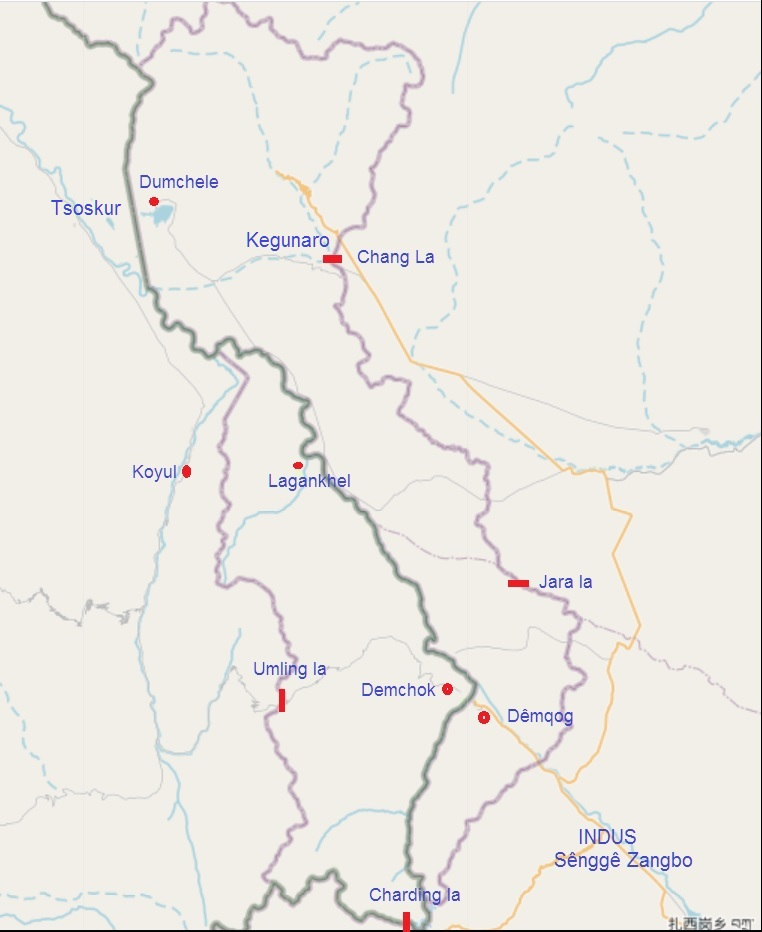
The Demchok sector with China's claim line in the west and India's claim line in the east. The Line of Actual Control, shown in bold, starting from Charding La in south runs north along the Charding Nullah to Demchok and then west along Indus River to Lagankhel near confluence with the Chibra stream and then till confluence near Fukche with the Koyul Lungpa river from Chang La, then heads northwest to the mountain watershed.

Demchok is at an elevation of 4,210 metres (13,810 ft), on a stony plain at the foot of a pyramidal white peak called Demchok Lhari Karpo. A stream called Charding Nullah (or Lhari stream) flows down on the southeast side of Demchok joining the Indus River. The alluvial deposits from the stream form small plots for grazing and farming. Around the corner of the Demchok Lhari Karpo peak is a hot spring near Demchok, whose water is believed to have medicinal qualities.

The Line of Actual Control (LAC) with Tibet runs on the southeast side of the village along the Charding Nullah. Across the stream, 600 metres away, is the Tibetan Demchok village. After reaching the Indus River, the LAC follows its right bank, according to Indian explorer Romesh Bhattacharji. leaving the left bank of Indus under Indian control. The Chinese still retain a claim to the Indian part of the disputed Demchok sector and object to any construction there. Along the left bank of the Indus River, numerous streams flow down from the ridge line in the west to the Indus, providing grazing grounds and campsites to the Changpa nomads. (Note: The survey maps list, south to north in the Indus Valley, the campsites Umlungzing, Silungle, Sinakle, Nyakmikle, Sikarle, Khordo Sirpale, and Lagankhel. Lagankhel is actually the name of a larger river that joins the Indus, a few kilometres south of Koyul Lungpa river. The British Raj set the boundary of Ladakh along this river, in c. 1868. But there is no evidence of the boundary having been enforced.) The largest of these is the site of Lagankhel (La Ganskyil), which is historically regarded as a village with permanent settlement. Some of these locations are now said to host posts of Indo-Tibetan Border Police as does the Demchok village itself.

An old travel route from Ladakh to Tibet, leading to Kailas–Manasarowar, runs along the left bank of the Indus River. The route has been closed since the emergence of Sino-Indian border disputes. There have been persistent demands from the local population to reopen it.

== History ==
Demchok is a historic area of Ladakh, having been part of the kingdom from its inception in the 10th century. The description of the kingdom in the Ladakh Chronicles mentions Demchok Karpo, also called Demchok Lhari Karpo or Lhari Karpo, as part of the original kingdom. This is a possible reference to the rocky white peak behind the present-day Demchok village. (Note: Scholars translate the Tibetan term lha-ri as "soul mountain". Many peaks in Tibet are named lhari including a "Demchok lhari" in the northern suburbs of Lhasa. "Karpo", meaning "white", serves to distinguish the Ladakh mountain peak from the others.) The Lhari peak is held sacred by Buddhists. Demchok (Sanskrit: Cakrasaṃvara) is the name of a Buddhist Tantric deity, who is believed to reside on the Mount Kailas, and whose imagery parallels that of Shiva in Hinduism. The Lhari peak is also referred to as "Chota Kailas" (mini Kailas) and attracts both Hindu and Buddhists pilgrims. Tibetologist Nirmal C. Sinha states that Demchok is part of the Hemis complex. Ruined houses belonging to the Hemis monastery were noticed by Sven Hedin in 1907, and the monastery continues to own land in Demchok.

The stream that flows beside the Lhari peak, referred to as the Lhari stream in historical documents ("Charding Nullah" or "Demchok River" in modern times), was set as the boundary between Ladakh and Tibet at the end of the Tibet–Ladakh–Mughal War in the 17th century.

=== Dogra rule ===
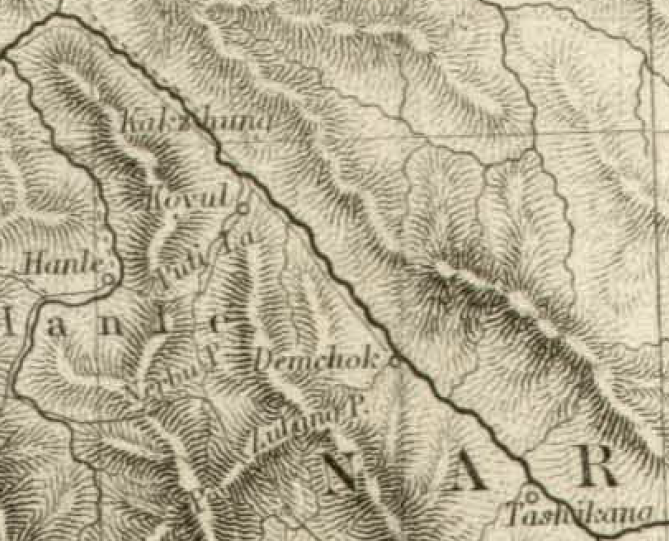
Demchok in a map of Henry Strachey, 1853

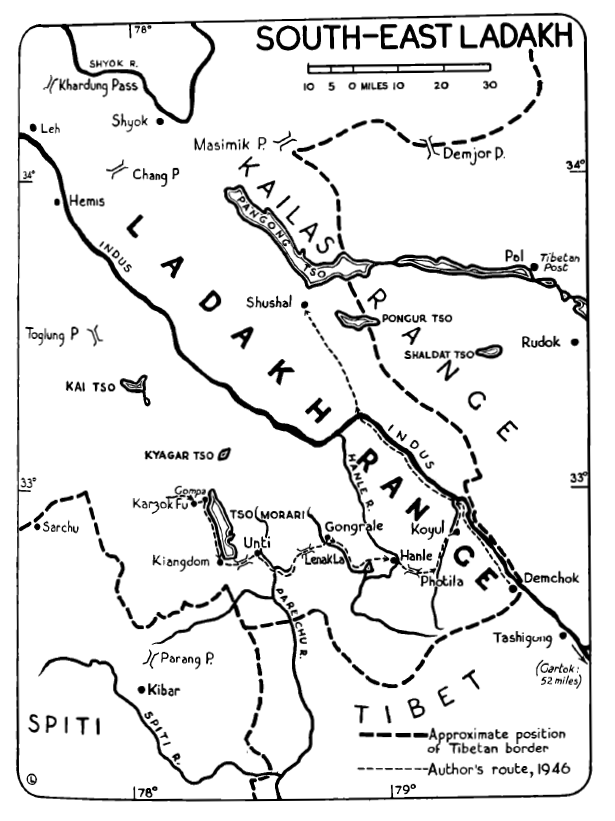
Map of the Demchok region by a British traveller in 1946

In 1834, the Dogra general Zorawar Singh conquered Ladakh and made it a tributary of the Sikh Empire. Zorawar Singh is said to have built a fort on a hill next to the Tibetan side of Demchok. (Note: According to the Ladakh member of parliament Jamyang Tsering Namgyal, "Zorawar Fort in Demjok was destroyed by PLA in 2008 and setup PLA's Observing Point in 2012 during UPA regime and also created Chinese/new Demjok/Colony with 13 cemented houses.") He also launched an invasion of Tibet via three wings, one of which passed through Demchok. The invasion was eventually repulsed. The two sides agreed to retain the borders as they were before.

The Dogras came under the suzerainty of British Raj in 1846, as the state of Jammu and Kashmir. Henry Strachey visited the Demchok area in 1847, as part of a British boundary commission. He described Demchok as a "hamlet divided by a rivulet [the Lhari stream]", with settlements on both the sides of the stream. The stream was the prevailing border between Ladakh and Tibet. The Tibetans did not allow Strachey to proceed beyond the stream.

The hamlet on the Ladakhi side of the Lhari stream appears to have been minimal. Strachey's own map published in the JRGS showed a village only on the Tibetan side of the stream. The map drawn by a Tibetan lama from the same period showed the same.

Sven Hedin, travelling through the area in 1907, noticed only ruins of houses on the Ladakhi side, formerly belonging to the Hemis monastery. According to the governor of Ladakh (wazir-e-wazarat), who visited the area in 1904–05, there were two 'zaminders' (landholders) on the Ladakhi side, viz., the representatives of the Hemis monastery and the former kardar (tax collector) of Rupshu. The two appear to have lived in Demchok from around 1921, in a single building.

According to the Indian government, the Ladakhi Demchok village was used for seasonal cultivation by nomadic farmers.

=== Independent India ===
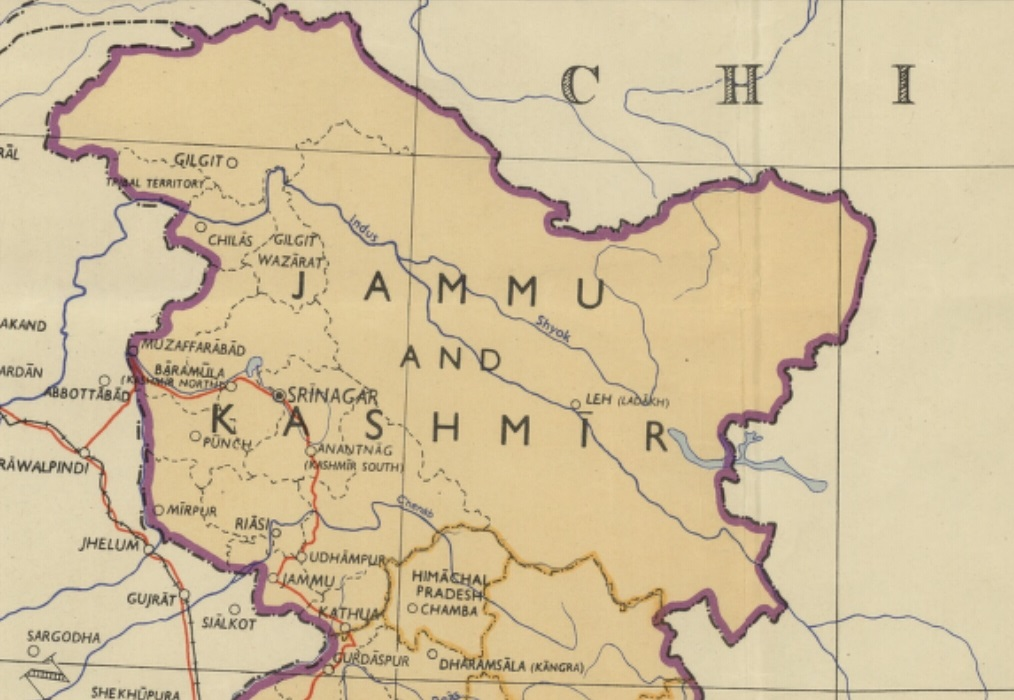
Indian border definition in 1954

The princely state of Jammu and Kashmir acceded to independent India on 26–27 October 1947.

In 1950, Tibet was annexed by China. The Indian government developed concerns of security and decided not to allow the entry of Tibetans into Ladakh. A border police post was established at Demchok (presumably on the Ladakhi side), with a police contingent headed by an inspector and equipped with wireless communication. (Note: Similar posts were also established at Chushul and Shyok.) In Chinese perception, this amounted to the Indian Army "invading" Demchok.

During the negotiations for the 1954 Trade Agreement, India asked for Ladakh's trade relations with Rudok and Rawang to be reinstated. China did not agree. However, it was happy to allow trade via "Demchok" (Note: These references to "Demchok" are to be interpreted as an undivided Demchok village, which was being claimed by both India and China.) and Tashigang. In fact, it offered to provide a "trade mart" in Demchok, which was not agreeable to India because India regarded Demchok as its own territory. The final agreement carried the wording, "the customary route leading to Tashigong along the valley of the Indus River may continue to be traversed."

In 1954, India defined its borders with respect to Tibet, which ran five miles southeast of Ladakhi Demchok. This made the Tibetan Demchok village part of Indian-claimed territory. In October 1955, the Chinese established a "Border Working Group" in the Tibetan Demchok village.

During the 1962 Sino-Indian War, the Chinese forces reclaimed the areas southeast of the Lhari stream. The Line of Actual Control resulting from the war runs along the Lhari stream. (Note: An Indian government letter dated 21 September 1965 stated that the "Indian civilian post" was "on the western [northwestern] side of the Nullah on the Indian side of the line of actual control". The Chinese Government response on 24 September referred to "the Demchok village on the Chinese side of the line of actual control" while it called the Ladakhi Demchok village, across "the Demchok River", as "Parigas".)

== Demographics ==
According to the 2011 Census of India, Demchok had 31 households and a population of 78. The majority of the inhabitants are Changpa nomadic pastoralist. The effective literacy rate is 42.47%.

There is persistent talk of the nomads losing their customary grazing lands to Chinese occupation and their livelihoods being lost. The population is seen to be reducing as a result.

Demographics (2011 Census)
	Total	Male	Female
Population	78	43	35
Children aged below 6 years	5	4	1
Scheduled caste	1	1	0
Scheduled tribe	64	37	27
Literates	31	20	11
Workers (all)	51	27	24
Main workers (total)	49	26	23
Main workers: Cultivators	5	5	0
Main workers: Agricultural labourers	0	0	0
Main workers: Household industry workers	2	0	2
Main workers: Other	42	21	21
Marginal workers (total)	2	1	1
Marginal workers: Cultivators	0	0	0
Marginal workers: Agricultural labourers	0	0	0
Marginal workers: Household industry workers	0	0	0
Marginal workers: Others	2	1	1
Non-workers	27	16	11

== Sino-Indian disputes ==
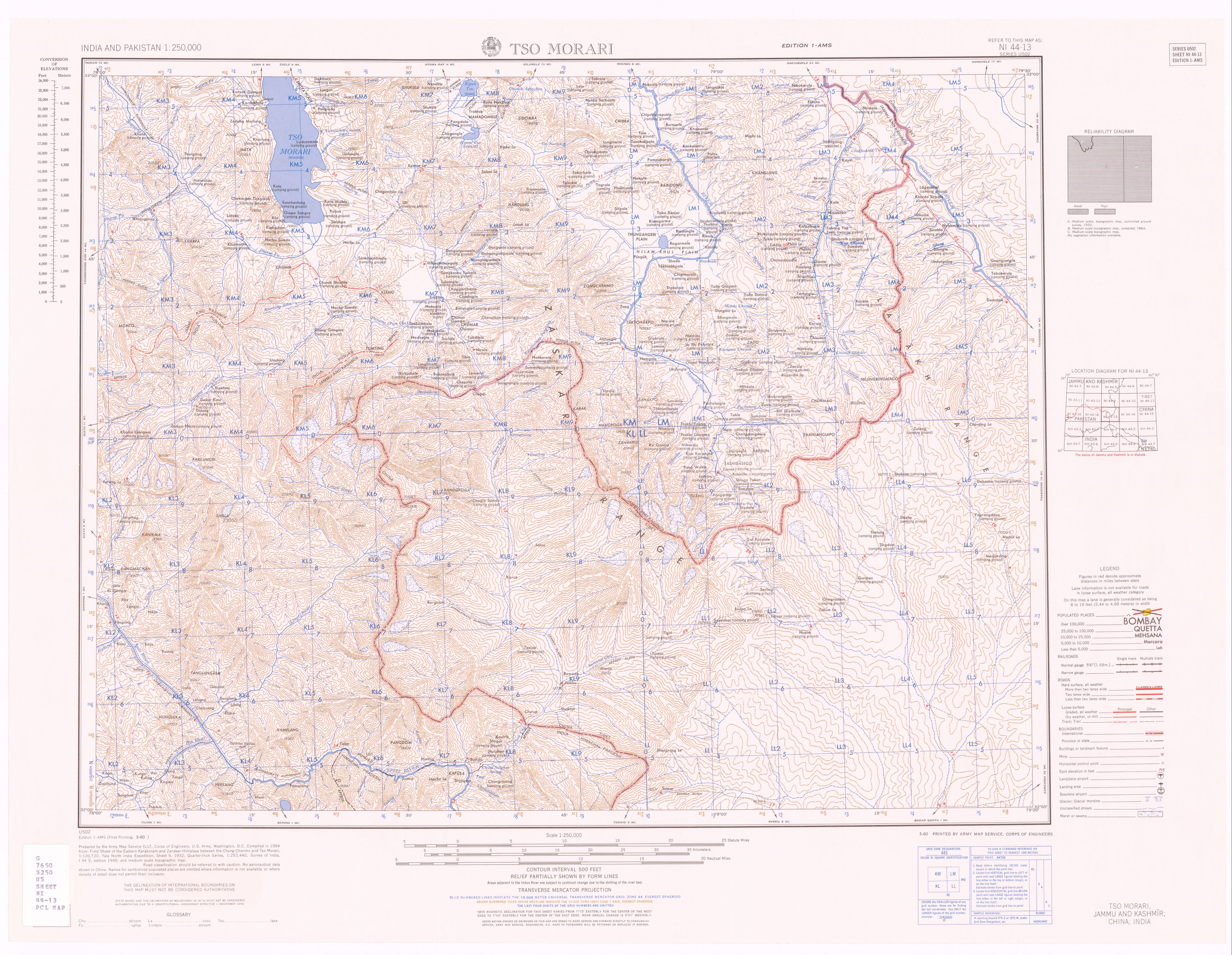
Map including Demchok (Army Map Service, 1954)

As of 2005, the route from Demchok to Lake Manasarovar in Tibet was closed and local trade with China was prohibited, although local residents admit that clandestine trade with China had been ongoing for decades.

In April 2016, the Daily Excelsior reported that local discontent over Chinese army objections near the border resulted in demands for resettlement from Demchok. Later in 2016, the Nubra constituency MLA Deldan Namgyal reported that the Chinese military suggested to the sarpanch of Demchok "to join China rather than [sit] with India" due to the infrastructural differences across the border. Demchok residents protested after the Indian Army refused permission for the local residents to build irrigation canals, to avoid a reaction from Chinese army.

In 2019, the sarpanch of Demchok said that residents of Demchok were moving to the town of Leh due to a lack of infrastructure and jobs.

== Infrastructure ==
=== Transportation ===
"Chushul-Dungti-Fukche-Demchok Highway" (CDFD Road), once a dirt track along the southern bank of the Indus River, is scheduled to be converted to a single-lane national highway by 2025. This has been a traditional route between Demchok and Chushul, which connects Demchok to Koyul, Dungti, Chushul and beyond to Durbuk and Leh. The road was in poor condition in 2017 and attempts to improve the road met with objections from China in 2009. After repeated incursions by China since 2013, in March 2016 the Government of Jammu and Kashmir approved the upgrade of this road. Since the road passes through the Changthang Wildlife Sanctuary, the subsequent approval by India's National Board for Wildlife in March 2017 paved the way for the upgrade of this road.

"Chismule-Umling La-Demchok Road" (CUD Road): A new 86 km long road from Chismule in the Koyul Lungpa valley to Demchok was constructed by the Border Roads Organisation in 2017, via the Umling La pass (32.6964°N 79.2842°E) at a height of 19,300 ft (5,900 m). This road connects Chismule to Demchok, Koyul, Hanle and other places in Ladakh.

"Hanle-Koyul-Fukche-Demchok Road" (HKFD Road) was constructed by BRO, which runs via Koyul and has 3 alternate sub-routes, i.e. from Hanle northeastern route via Mig La, eastern route via Photi La, and southeastern route via Chisumle.

=== Mobile and internet connectivity ===
In June 2020, it was announced that Demchok is among 54 villages in the Ladakh region to receive mobile phone and internet connectivity via satellite under the Universal Service Obligation Funding. The service is to be operated by Jio.

== See also ==
- Fukche
- India-China Border Roads
- Chumar

== Bibliography ==
- India, Ministry of External Affairs, ed. (1962), Report of the Officials of the Governments of India and the People's Republic of China on the Boundary Question, Government of India Press
  - Indian Report: Part 1 (PDF); Part 2 (PDF); Part 3 (PDF); Part 4 (PDF)
  - Chinese report: Part 1 (PDF); Part 2 (PDF); Part 3 (PDF);
- Ahmad, Zahiruddin (1968). "New Light on the Tibet-Ladakh-Mughal War of 1679—1684". East and West. 18 (3/4): 340–361. JSTOR 29755343.
- Arpi, Claude (December 2016) [abridged version published in Indian Defence Review, 19 May 2017], The Case of Demchok (PDF)
- Bhasin, Avtar Singh (2021), Nehru, Tibet and China, Penguin Random House, ISBN 9780670094134
- Bhattacharji, Romesh (2012), Ladakh: Changing, Yet Unchanged, New Delhi: Rupa Publications – via Academia.edu
- Bray, John (Winter 1990), "The Lapchak Mission From Ladakh to Lhasa in British Indian Foreign Policy", The Tibet Journal, 15 (4): 75–96, JSTOR 43300375
- Cheema, Brig Amar (2015), The Crimson Chinar: The Kashmir Conflict: A Politico Military Perspective, Lancer Publishers, ISBN 978-81-7062-301-4
- Francke, August Hermann (1926). Antiquities of Indian Tibet, Part 2. Calcutta: Superintendent Government Printing – via archive.org.
- Emmer, Gerhard (2007), "Dga' Ldan Tshe Dbang Dpal Bzang Po and the Tibet-Ladakh-Mughal War of 1679-84", Proceedings of the Tenth Seminar of the IATS, 2003. Volume 9: The Mongolia-Tibet Interface: Opening New Research Terrains in Inner Asia, BRILL, pp. 81–108, ISBN 978-90-474-2171-9
- Fisher, Margaret W.; Rose, Leo E.; Huttenback, Robert A. (1963), Himalayan Battleground: Sino-Indian Rivalry in Ladakh, Praeger – via archive.org
- Handa, O. C. (2001), Buddhist Western Himalaya: A Politico-Religious History, Indus Publishing Company, ISBN 978-81-7387-124-5
- Hedin, Sven (1922), Southern Tibet: Discoveries in Former Times Compared with My Own Researches in 1906–1908: Vol. IV – Kara-korum and Chang-Tang, Stockholm: Lithographic Institute of the General Staff of the Swedish Army
- Howard, Neil; Howard, Kath (2014), "Historic Ruins in the Gya Valley, Eastern Ladakh, and a Consideration of Their Relationship to the History of Ladakh and Maryul", in Erberto Lo Bue; John Bray (eds.), Art and Architecture in Ladakh: Cross-cultural Transmissions in the Himalayas and Karakoram, BRILL, pp. 68–99, ISBN 978-90-04-27180-7
- Lamb, Alastair (1964), The China-India border, Oxford University Press
- Lamb, Alastair (1965), "Treaties, Maps and the Western Sector of the Sino-Indian Boundary Dispute" (PDF), The Australian Year Book of International Law, 1: 37–52, doi:10.1163/26660229-001-01-900000005
- Lamb, Alastair (1989), Tibet, China & India, 1914-1950: a history of imperial diplomacy, Roxford Books, ISBN 9780907129035
- Lange, Diana (2017), "Decoding Mid-19th Century Maps of the Border Area between Western Tibet, Ladakh, and Spiti", Revue d'Études Tibétaines, The Spiti Valley Recovering the Past and Exploring the Present
- McKay, Alex (2015), Kailas Histories: Renunciate Traditions and the Construction of Himalayan Sacred Geography, BRILL, ISBN 978-90-04-30618-9
- Petech, Luciano (1977), The Kingdom of Ladakh, c. 950–1842 A.D., Instituto Italiano Per il Medio ed Estremo Oriente – via archive.org
- Sandhu, P. J. S.; Shankar, Vinay; Dwivedi, G. G. (2015), 1962: A View from the Other Side of the Hill, Vij Books India Pvt Ltd, ISBN 978-93-84464-37-0
