= Chandra Prakash Kala =

Indian ecologist and professor

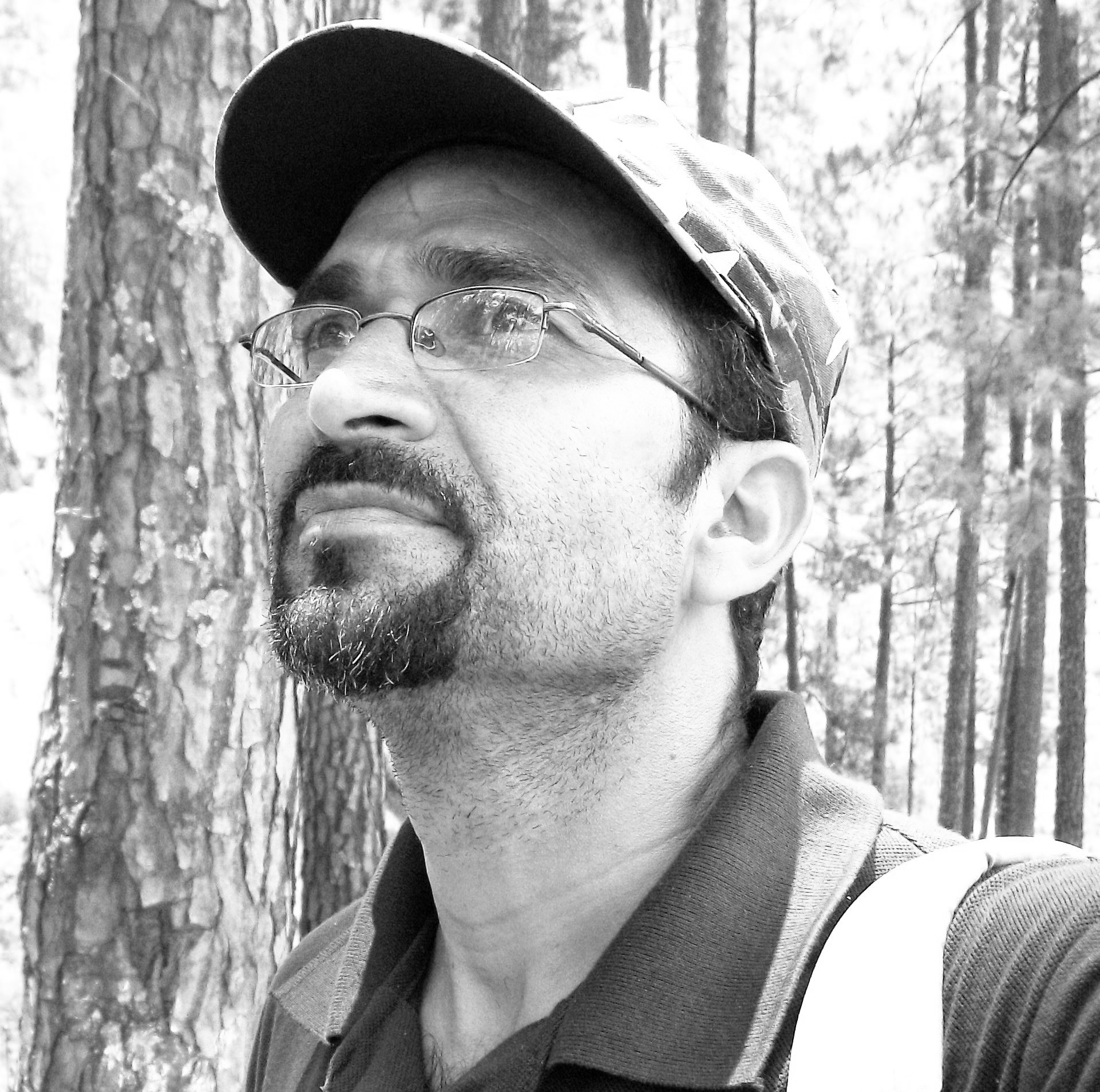
Chandra Prakash Kala in the middle Himalayan region of India

Chandra Prakash Kala is an Indian ecologist and professor. His research interests include alpine ecology, conservation biology, indigenous knowledge systems, ethnobotany and medicinal aromatic plants. He is an assistant professor in the faculty area of Ecosystem and Environment Management at the Indian Institute of Forest Management.

== Early life and education ==
Kala was born and grew up in Sumari, a small village of Uttarakhand state in India. He studied life sciences at the Hemwati Nandan Bahuguna Garhwal University, Srinagar before completing a PhD on the ecology and conservation of the Valley of Flowers National Park at the Forest Research Institute (a deemed university), Dehradun.

== Career ==
He has published over 185 research papers and articles and nine books including: The Valley of Flowers: Myth and Reality, Medicinal Plants of Indian Trans-Himalaya, Medicinal Plants of Uttarakhand, and Ecology and Conservation of Valley of Flowers National Park. He writes popular articles regularly in English and Hindi. His decade long studies on the Valley of Flowers National Park laid the foundation stone to declare the Valley of Flowers a World Heritage Site by UNESCO in 2005.

Kala has surveyed two major traditional systems of Asian therapies - Ayurveda and the traditional Tibetan medicine. He has studied various natural resource management practices evolved by various tribal communities in northwest, northeast and central India, especially in Arunachal Pradesh, Himachal Pradesh, Jammu and Kashmir, Uttarakhand, Chhattisgarh and Madhya Pradesh. Besides the Valley of Flowers, he surveyed many other high altitude protected areas, including Kedarnath Wild Life Sanctuary, Great Himalayan National Park, Hemis National Park, Karakorum Wildlife Sanctuary, Changthang Wildlife Sanctuary, Kibber Wildlife Sanctuary, Pin Valley National Park and Binsar Wildlife Sanctuary. Kala also has surveyed the Alps including the only national park of Slovenia, Triglav National Park.

He has served internationally recognized institutions well known for framing and implementing policies, including the National Medicinal Plants Board, the apex body of the Ministry of Health and Family Welfare, of India.

Kala is on the editorial and advisory board of over a dozen of national and international scientific journals, including Journal of Ethnobiology and Ethnomedicine, American Journal of Plant Sciences, International Journal of Ecology, Applied Ecology and Environmental Sciences, International Journal of Forestry Research, Journal of Biodiversity and African Journal of Plant Sciences.

== Award and recognition ==
Kala is a member of the National Academy of Sciences, the first science academy of India established in 1930. He has been awarded fellowships from the national and international institutions including the International Centre for Integrated Mountain Development, Nepal the Ministry of Environment and Forests, the Wildlife Institute of India, and the G. B. Pant Institute of Himalayan Environment and Development - for carrying out research on the ecology and biodiversity conservation in the various national parks, wildlife sanctuaries and biosphere reserves of the Indian Himalayas.

He has been a visiting scholar at Pennsylvania State University, in the United States and the University of Ljubljana in Slovenia.

Kala was awarded the prestigious ICFRE Award for Excellence in the Forest Conservation (Biodiversity and Ecology).

== Works ==
=== Collection ===
- Nanda's Neelkanth

=== Short stories ===
- "A Delicious Affairs"
- "Nagrasani"
- "The Last Wish"
- "The Tip of the Tail"
- "Man-eaters of Garhwal"
- "Spurge and Snake Bite"
- "Tapyo"
- "My Favorite Medicine"
- "The Prisoners of School"
- "Riding the Best"
- "Gaura’s Home"
- "Aunty"
- "A Killer in the Clouds"
- "A Bull in the Leopard’s Monarchy"
- "The Heavenly Leaf"
- "The Forgotten Healers"
- "His Confession"
- "Seers of Pandukeshwar"
- "Battle Between the Best"
- "The Fragrance of Parijaat"
- "The Childhood Friend"

=== Travelogues ===
- "On His Wishes"
- "The Bear’s Trail"
- "A Non-vegetarian in the Holy Hills"
- "A Job Hunter"
- "My First Job"
- "My Maiden Visit to Penn State"
- "Botanist of Surguja"
- "Ziro"
- "A City of Biodiversity"
- "A Week with Everest and Nanda Devi Summiteers"
- "The Silence of Candolim"
- "The Land of Many Shades"
- "Om Mani Padme Hum"
- "The Roof of the World"
- "The Floating Heaven"
- "A Vagrant and the ‘Queen of Mountains’"
- "Hidden Gem of Europe"
- "The Majesty of Mahasu"

=== Essays ===
- "Paradise Under Fire"
- "Taste the Himalayas"
- "Revitalizing Sacred Grove"
- "The Tremor of Tragedy"
- "Mountains of Sanjeevani"
- "Grasslands in Peril"
- "Call from the Hills"
- "Sacred, a Way of Life"

=== Books ===
- The Valley of Flowers: Myth and Reality
- Medicinal Plants of Uttarakhand
- Medicinal Plants of Indian Trans-Himalaya
- Medicinal Plants and Sustainable Development
- Biodiversity, Communities and Climate Change
