= Karakoram Wildlife Sanctuary =

Wildlife sanctuary

- Karakoram (Nubra Shyok) Wildlife Sanctuary
- IUCN category IV (habitat/species management area)
- Location within Ladakh Location within India
- Interactive map of Karakoram Wildlife Sanctuary
- Location: Leh district, Ladakh, India
- Coordinates: 34°43′N 77°26′E
- Area: ~ 5,000 km^{2} (1,900 sq mi)
- Established: 1987
- Governing body: Government of India

Karakoram Wildlife Sanctuary, also known as the Nubra Shyok or the Siachen Shyok, is a high-elevation wildlife sanctuary in the easternmost reaches of the Karakoram range in Leh district of Ladakh. It was established in 1987 and covers an area of about 5,000 km^{2} (1,900 sq mi). It is one of the few places in India with a migratory population of the Chiru.

== History ==
Karakoram Wildlife Sanctuary, established in 1987, is managed by the Wildlife Warden in Kargil, Ladakh. It measures around 5,000 km^{2} (1,900 sq mi). It is classified as IUCN protected area (category IV) by the World Conservation Monitoring Centre. The Botanical Survey of India has called the wildlife sanctuary as an "under explored area with regards to botanical knowledge". Karakoram Wildlife Sanctuary could become the "transboundary counterpart" of the Central Karakoram National Park in Gilgit Baltistan. If the Karakoram Wildlife Sanctuary is linked to the Siachen Peace Park, it could become a World Heritage Site.

== Geography ==
Karakoram Wildlife Sanctuary lies entirely in the northeast area of India-administered Ladakh. Its boundaries, defined by the Wildlife Institute of India (WII), are:

- Southern boundary: run from Karu to Leh along NH-3, then from Leh along NH-1 to Khalatse then to Hanuthang and Thanga at Loc;
- Western boundary: then turn north from Thanga to and run along India-Pakistan Loc and northwest along AGPL in Siachen till Indira Col tri-junction of temporary but disputed borders held by India-Pakistan-China;
- Northern boundary: then from Indira Col, turn east and run along India-China LAC till north of Charbagh Kangri, then eastward along Darbuk–Shyok–DBO Road till Durbuk;
- Eastern boundary: then from Durbuk to Karu (on NH-3).

== Ecology ==
Being a cold desert area, the vegetation in Karakoram Wildlife Sanctuary is quite sparse. However, the ecological marginal conditions have employed some remarkable characteristics in these vegetation, which has high medicinal properties.

=== Flora ===
This Wildlife Sanctuary has been extensively surveyed by Chandra Prakash Kala for distribution of vegetation, including plants of medicinal values, across the environmental gradient and habitat types. Fifteen rare and endangered medicinal plant species have been discovered by CP Kala from this sanctuary, which are distributed over different habitat types. Arnebia euchroma, Bergenia stracheyi, Ephedra gerardiana, and Hyoscymus Niger are the threatened but medicinally important plants occur in this wildlife sanctuary.

== Fauna ==
The Karakoram Wildlife Sanctuary's fauna includes the elusive snow leopard, Siberian ibex, and bharal (blue sheep). It also hosts other high-altitude species like the Tibetan argali, Tibetan gazelle, Urial sheep, and wild yak. The Tibetan antelope (chiru) is also found here, as are several bird species like the black-necked crane (seasonally) and Himalayan snowcock.

=== Mammals ===
Snow leopard, Siberian ibex, Bharal (blue sheep), Tibetan argali, Tibetan antelope (chiru), Tibetan gazelle, Urial sheep, Wild yak, Tibetan wolf, Himalayan brown bear, Kiang (Tibetan Wild Ass), Bactrian camel.

=== Birds ===
Black-necked crane (seasonal), Himalayan snowcock, Tibetan snowfinch, Lammergeier (bearded vulture), etc.

== See also ==
- Hemis National Park
- Changthang Cold Desert Wildlife Sanctuary
- Geography of Ladakh
- Tourism in Ladakh
