= Kang Yatze =

Mountain in Markha valley in Ladakh, India

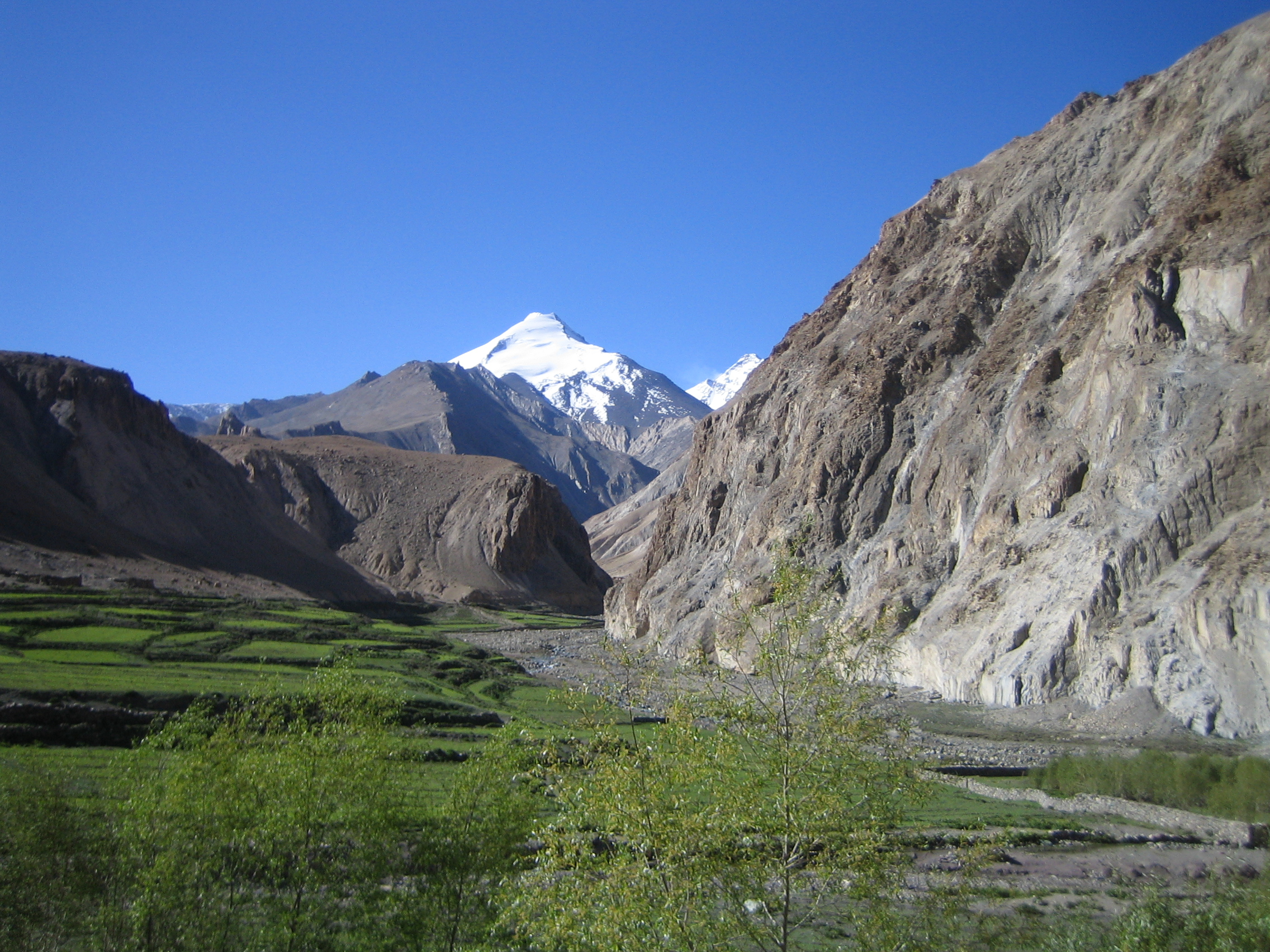
- Kang Yatze from Markha valley

Highest point
- Elevation: 6,400 m (21,000 ft)
- Prominence: 1,450 m (4,760 ft)
- Coordinates: 33°44′54″N 77°33′25″E

Geography
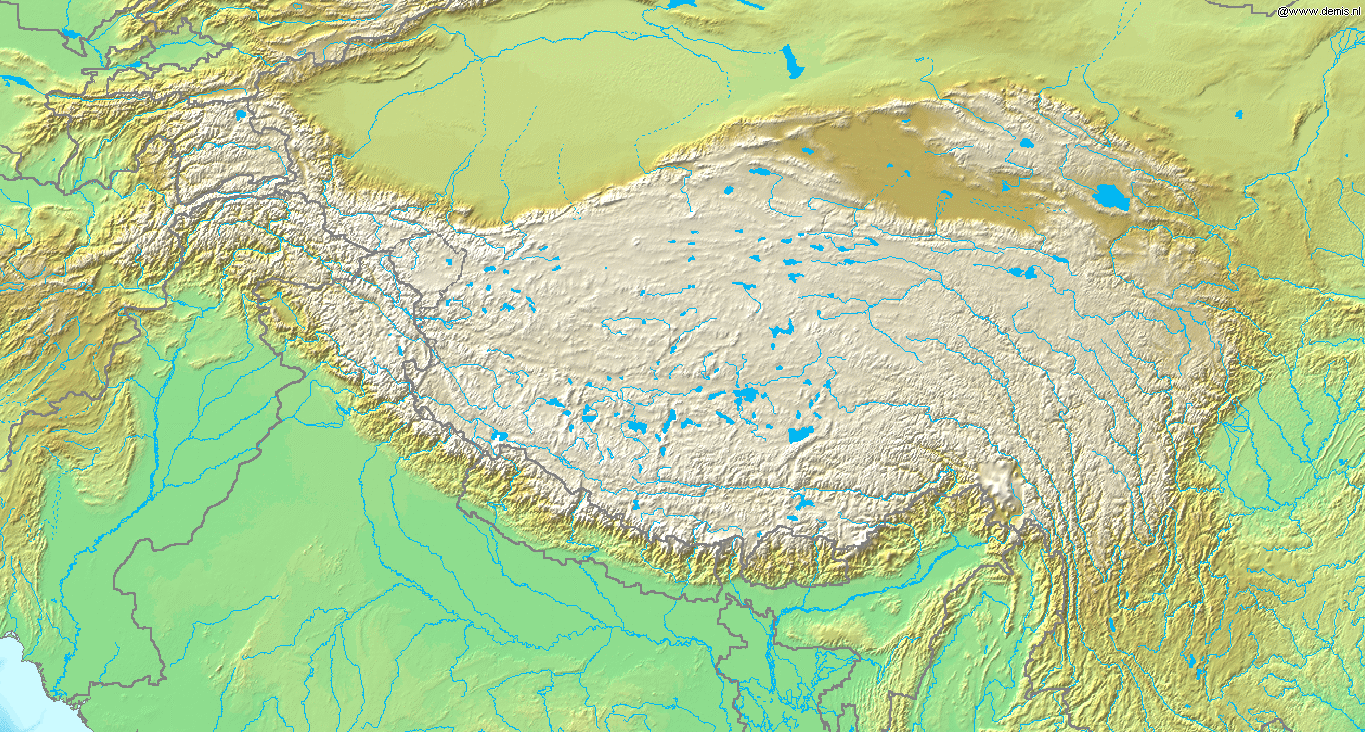
- Location within Tibetan Plateau Location within Ladakh
- Location: Ladakh
- Parent range: Himalayas

Climbing
- Easiest route: Western ridge on the mountain's north side

Kang Yatze or Kang Yatse (elevation 6,400 metres (21,000 ft)) is a mountain located at the end of the Markha valley in the Himalayas in the Ladakh region of northwest India. It is located in the Hemis National Park.

== Location ==
The mountain has two main summits, the lower western peak (Kang Yatze II) is easier (Alpine PD) and more frequently climbed, although lower at about 6200m. The higher eastern peak is the true summit (Kang Yatze I) although less frequently climbed as it is across a technically difficult knife-edge traverse. An alternative is to climb the North East ridge then directly up the steep snow face (Alpine AD+/D-).

Approach Route - 6200 meter peak is mainly done from mid-June till September end. There are two approach routes to this peak. One is from Chilling and trekking through the Markha Valley, passing by the villages of Skiu, Markha and Hankar. Another approach starts from the village of Shang Sumdo and steeply climbs up the Markha Gorge passing by the campsite of Chyuskirmo, Lartsa and then climbing the Gongmaru La, a 5130 meter high pass to reach Nimaling. This route climbs up very fast and one needs to rest in Nimaling to acclimatize better before trekking to the base camp at 5000 meters.

Climbing Kang Yatse Peak 2 (elevation 6,200 metres (20,300 ft)) is easier compared to the main peak and does not require any technical mountaineering skills. The climbing team usually starts the summit attempt between 12 AM to 2 AM and it takes about 6 – 8 hours to reach the summit. Ujaan Shivarama, aged 15 years and six months at the time of the ascent, is the youngest recorded person to summit the peak. The route climbs on scree zone before climbing up on steep snow slope. Early in the season in June and July can have snow from the base camp itself making the climb more slow and difficult. From the top distant peaks of East Karakoram are visible on a clear day.

Climbing Kang Yatse 1 requires an intermediate Camp to be set up. The climb to Camp 1 is a short one but over a steep scree zone. There is an alternative route following the Glacier where Camp 1 can be set up too. From Camp 1, the climb gets technical. The last 500 meters of the peak is very steep and requires fixed ropes.

== Gallery ==
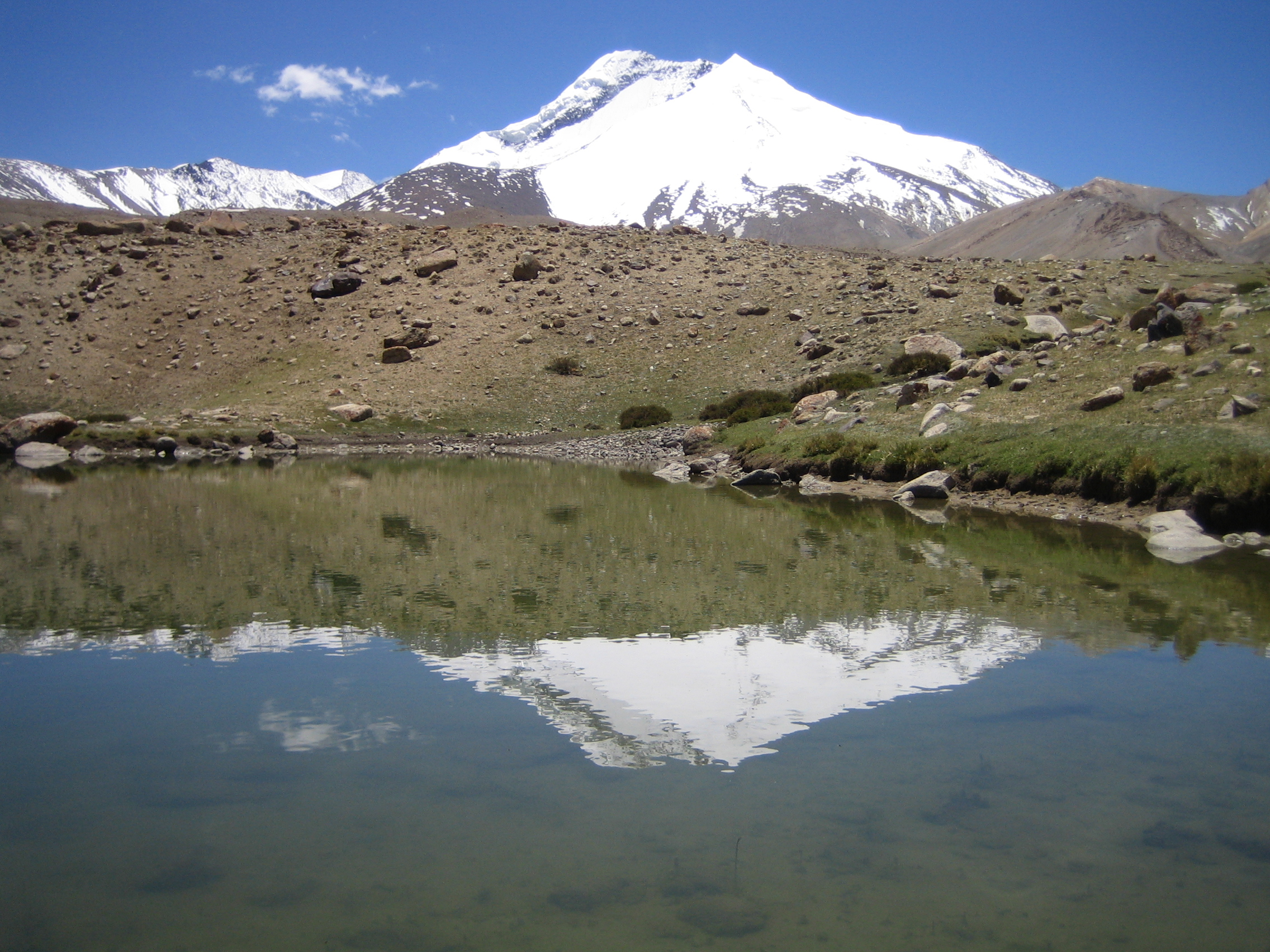
Kang Yatze from Kongmaru La
