= Markha River (India) =

River in India

Coordinates: 34°00′11″N 77°12′42″E

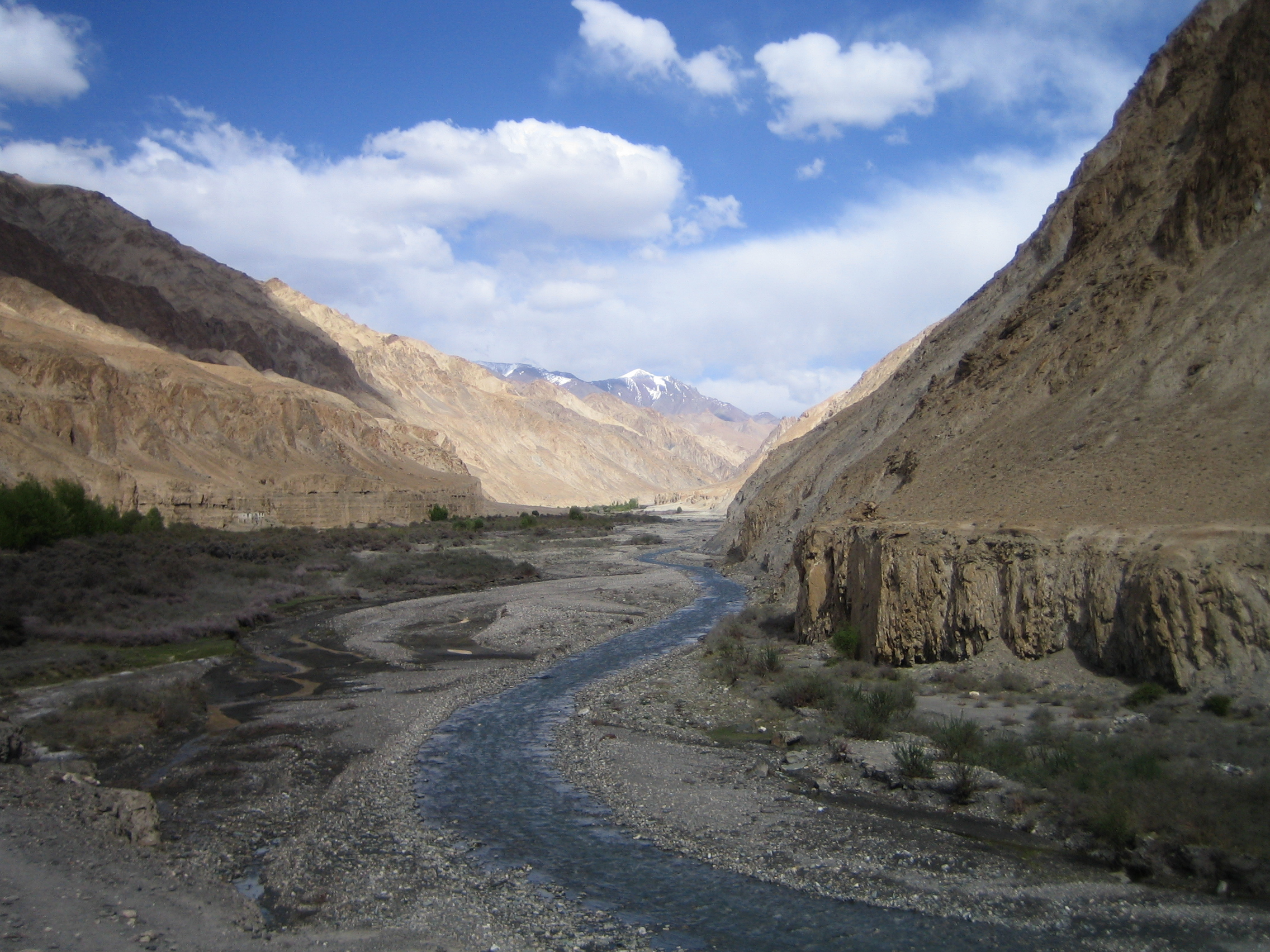
Markha River

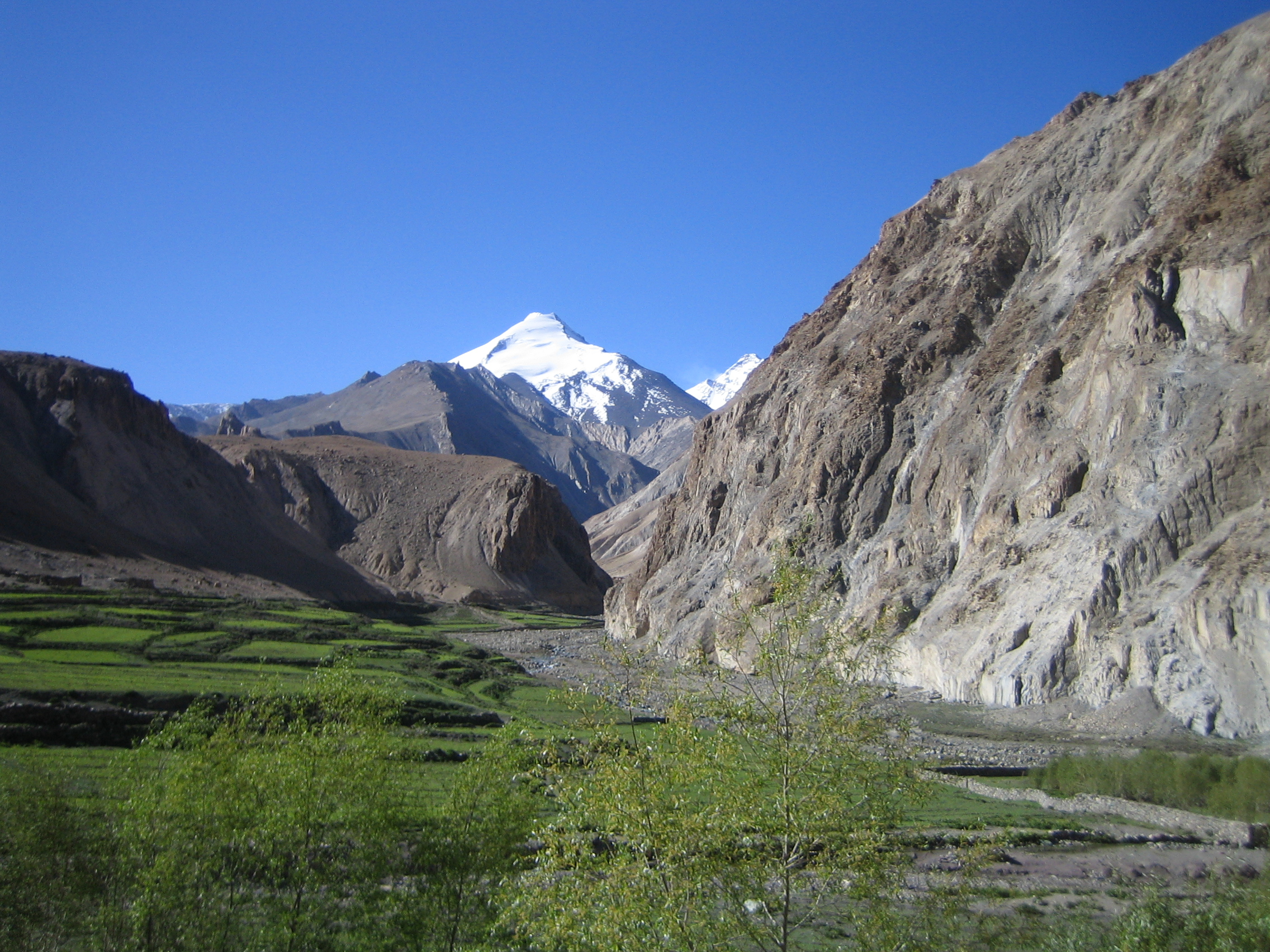
The 6,400-metre-high (21,000 ft) Kang Yatze from Markha valley

The Markha River is a river in Ladakh, India. It is a tributary of the Zanskar River and starts at the junction of the Langtang Chu and Nimaling Chu. Villages along the river valley include Skiu (Skyu), Markha, Umlung and Hangkar (Hankar). The Markha River lies within the Hemis National Park.

The Markha Valley is one of the most popular trekking routes in Ladakh, accessible from Ganda La pass near Spituk in the west, which is usually the beginning point of the trek, and Gongmaru La pass near Hemis, where the trek usually ends. Villages on the route of Markha valley trek are Rumbak, Shingo, Skyu, Sara, Markha and Hankar.

Towards the head of the valley you can find the Kang Yatze, a 6,400-metre-high (21,000 ft) mountain. The Markha River also passes to the south of the Stok range which includes the 6,153-metre-high (20,187 ft) Stok Kangri mountain.

== Demography ==
Nomadic families herd their yaks in this valley.

== Tourism ==
Many small monasteries exist, of which Techa Monastery is the most important Buddhist monastery in the Markha valley.

== See also ==
- Geography of Ladakh
- Tourism in Ladakh
