= Changthang Wildlife Sanctuary =

Protected area in Ladakh, India

- IUCN category IV (habitat/species management area)
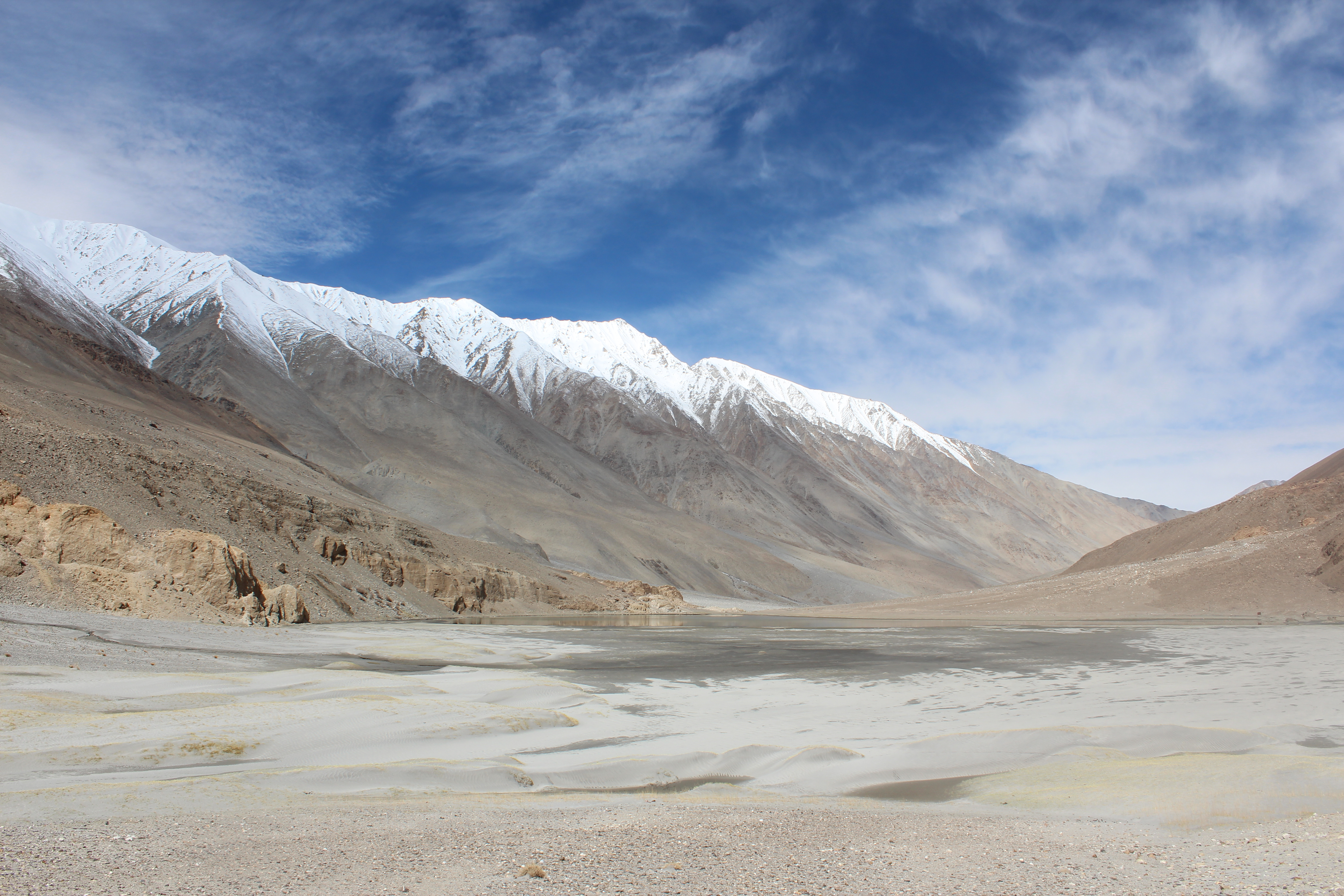
- Changthang Wildlife Sanctuary in Leh district (Ladakh), India
- Interactive map of Changthang Wildlife Sanctuary
- Location: Leh District, Ladakh, India
- Area: 4,000 km^{2} (1,500 sq mi)

Changthang Wildlife Sanctuary (or the Changthang Cold Desert Wildlife Sanctuary), a high-altitude wildlife sanctuary in the Ladakhi adjunct of the Changthang plateau in Leh district of Indian Union Territory of Ladakh, is one of the 3 largest wildlife sanctuaries in Ladakh, others being Karakoram Wildlife Sanctuary and Hemis National Park. It is 125 km east from Leh city, the capital of Ladakh.

== Geography ==
Covering an area of 4000 km^{2}, the Changthang Wildlife Sanctuary lies entirely within the northeast area of India-administered Ladakh. Its boundaries, defined by the Wildlife Institute of India (WII), are:

- Western boundary: From north of Charbagh Kangri on India-Pakistan Loc, then eastward along Darbuk–Shyok–DBO Road till Durbuk and Karu (on NH-3).
- Southern boundary: run from Karu to Pang along NH-3, then eastward till Narbu Sumdo (southeast of Tso Moriri) to Ladakh-Himachal-Tibet border tri-junction;
- Eastern boundary: from Ladakh-Himachal-Tibet border tri-junction turn northward, along India-China settled border and LAC via Chumar, Imis La, Charding Nullah to Demchok;
- Northern boundary: then from Demchok run westward along Indus River to Dungti and then along India-China LAC till north of Charbagh Kangri.

== Ecology ==
It is important as one of the few places in India with a population of the Kiang or Tibetan Wild Ass, as well as the rare Black-necked Crane.

== Transport ==
Hanle and Nyoma are important habitations in the area.

=== Air ===
Nearest civilian airport, Kushok Bakula Rimpochee Airport, is at Leh. Military airstrip are at Nyoma 74 km northwest and Fukche 24 km east.

=== Roads ===
Upshi-Nyoma-Hanle-Demchok Road, which branches off the NH3 at Upshi, runs through the Changthang Wildlife Sanctuary.

Hanle-Kaza-Tabo Road is being constructed by the BRO under the Indo-China Border Roads (ICBR) scheme. This road connects to and partially overlaps with the 125 km long Kiato-Karzok Road, from Kiato (near Kaza in Spiti Valley in Himachal Pradesh) through the Takling La Tunnel (5575 m) to Karzok (on shores of Tso Moriri), being constructed by the BRO as fourth alternative route to Ladakh.

Hanle-Zursar-Imis La Road was completed by December 2023.

== See also ==
- Geography of Ladakh
- Tourism in Ladakh
