= Rumbak =

- Village
- Location in Ladakh, India Rumbak (India)
- Coordinates: 34.054197°N 77.430348°E
- Country: India
- Union Territory: Ladakh
- District: Leh
- Tehsil: Leh

Population (2011)
  - Total: 248
- Time zone: UTC+5:30 (IST)
- Census code: 861

Rumbak is a village in the Leh district of Ladakh, India. It is located in the Leh tehsil and lies within Hemis National Park.

== Demographics ==
According to the 2011 census of India, Rumbak has 36 households. The effective literacy rate (i.e. the literacy rate of population excluding children aged 6 and below) is 79.91%.

Demographics (2011 Census)
	Total	Male	Female
Population	248	128	120
Children aged below 6 years	24	15	9
Scheduled caste	0	0	0
Scheduled tribe	248	128	120
Literates	179	101	78
Workers (all)	97	81	16
Main workers (total)	91	79	12
Main workers: Cultivators	53	47	6
Main workers: Agricultural labourers	1	1	0
Main workers: Household industry workers	0	0	0
Main workers: Other	37	31	6
Marginal workers (total)	6	2	4
Marginal workers: Cultivators	2	1	1
Marginal workers: Agricultural labourers	1	0	1
Marginal workers: Household industry workers	0	0	0
Marginal workers: Others	3	1	2
Non-workers	151	47	104
