= Naropa Festival: The Kumbh of the Himalayas =

Naropa Festival: The Kumbh of the Himalayas is held as 12-year event in Hemis, Ladakh, India, at the biggest Buddhist monastery in Ladakh in honour of Buddhist Scholar Saint Naropa and millions of Buddhist monks from across the world assemble in Ladakh for a month.

== Significance ==
Naropa Festival: The Kumbh of the Himalayas is also called "Naropa Festival" and is held once in 12 years. It is held in "Hemis",the biggest monastery in Ladakh in honour of Buddhist Scholar Saint,Naropa.

== Visitors ==
Naropa Festival: The Kumbh of the Himalayas is known for largest annual gathering of Buddhist monks numbering millions from across the world.

== Events ==
Naropa Festival: The Kumbh of the Himalayas also involves many cultural events during the festival.

== See also ==
- Festival in Buddhism
