= Stok Kangri =

Mountain in the Stok Range of the Himalayas in the Ladakh region of northwest India

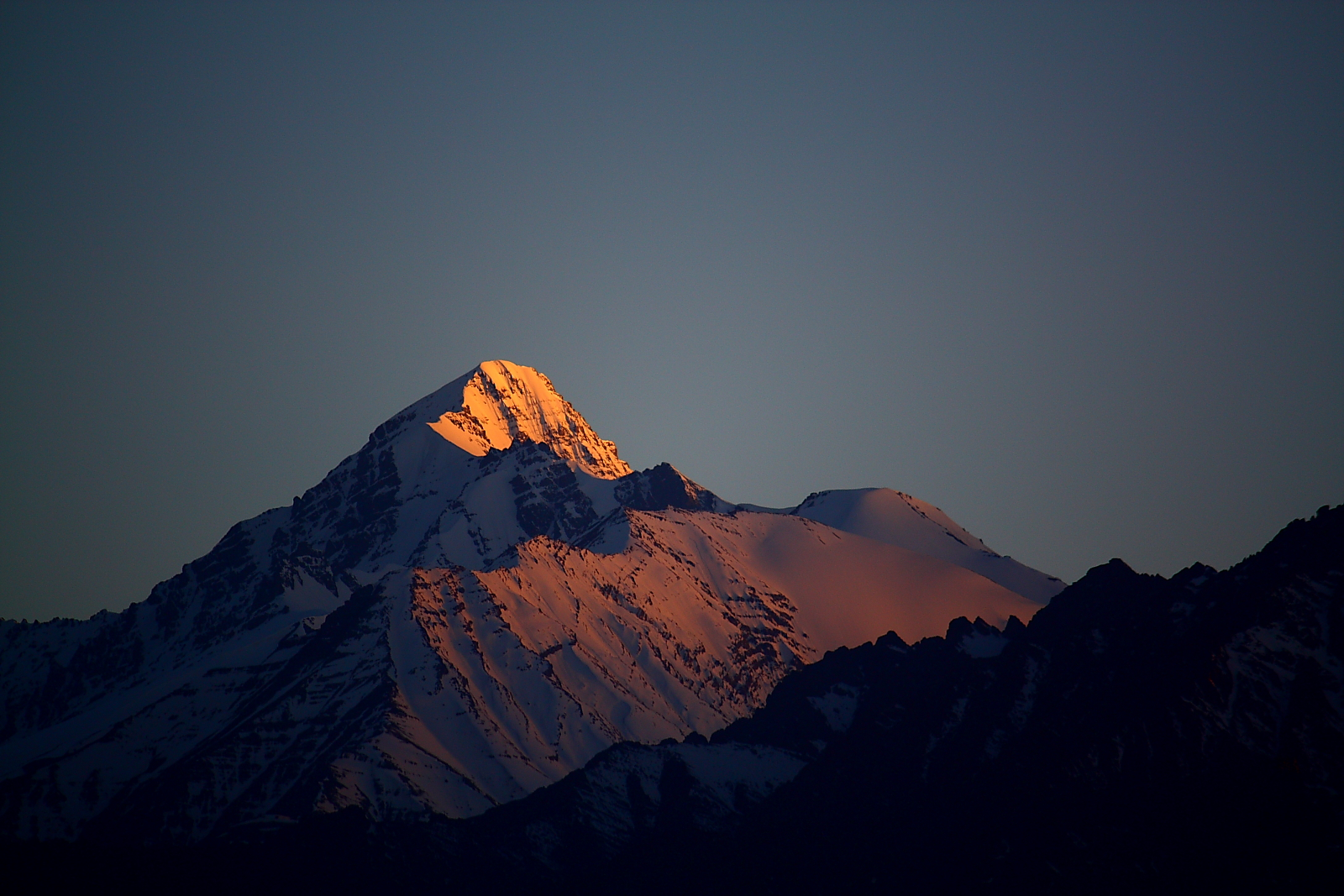
- Stok Kangri as seen from the Shanti Stupa, Leh.

Highest point
- Elevation: 6,153 m (20,187 ft)
- Prominence: 810 m (2,660 ft)
- Listing: Mountains of India; Ultra
- Coordinates: 33°59′10″N 77°26′33″E

Geography
- Location within Ladakh
- Location: Zanskar Range, Himalayas
- Parent range: Stok Range

Climbing
- First ascent: 1951

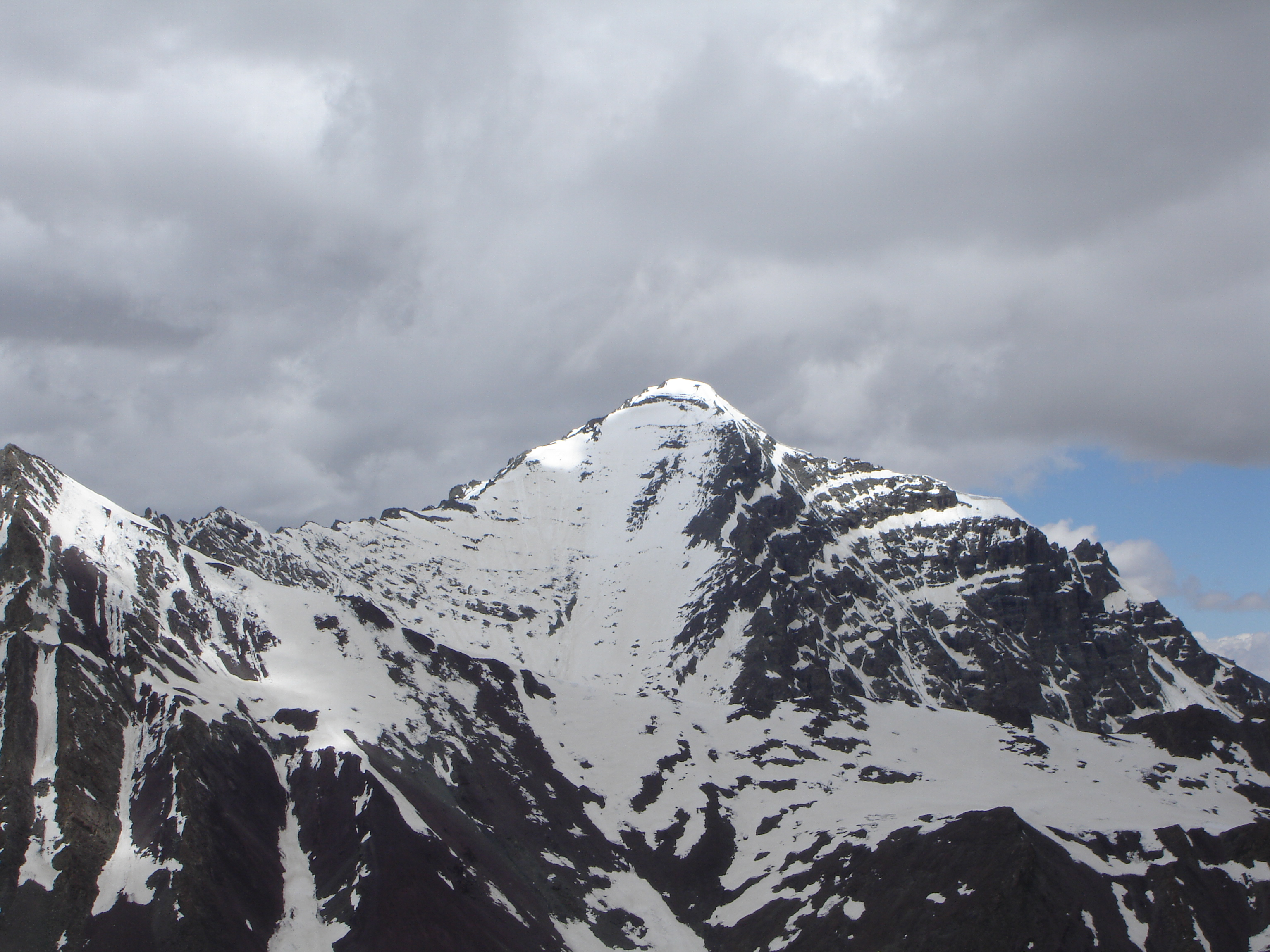

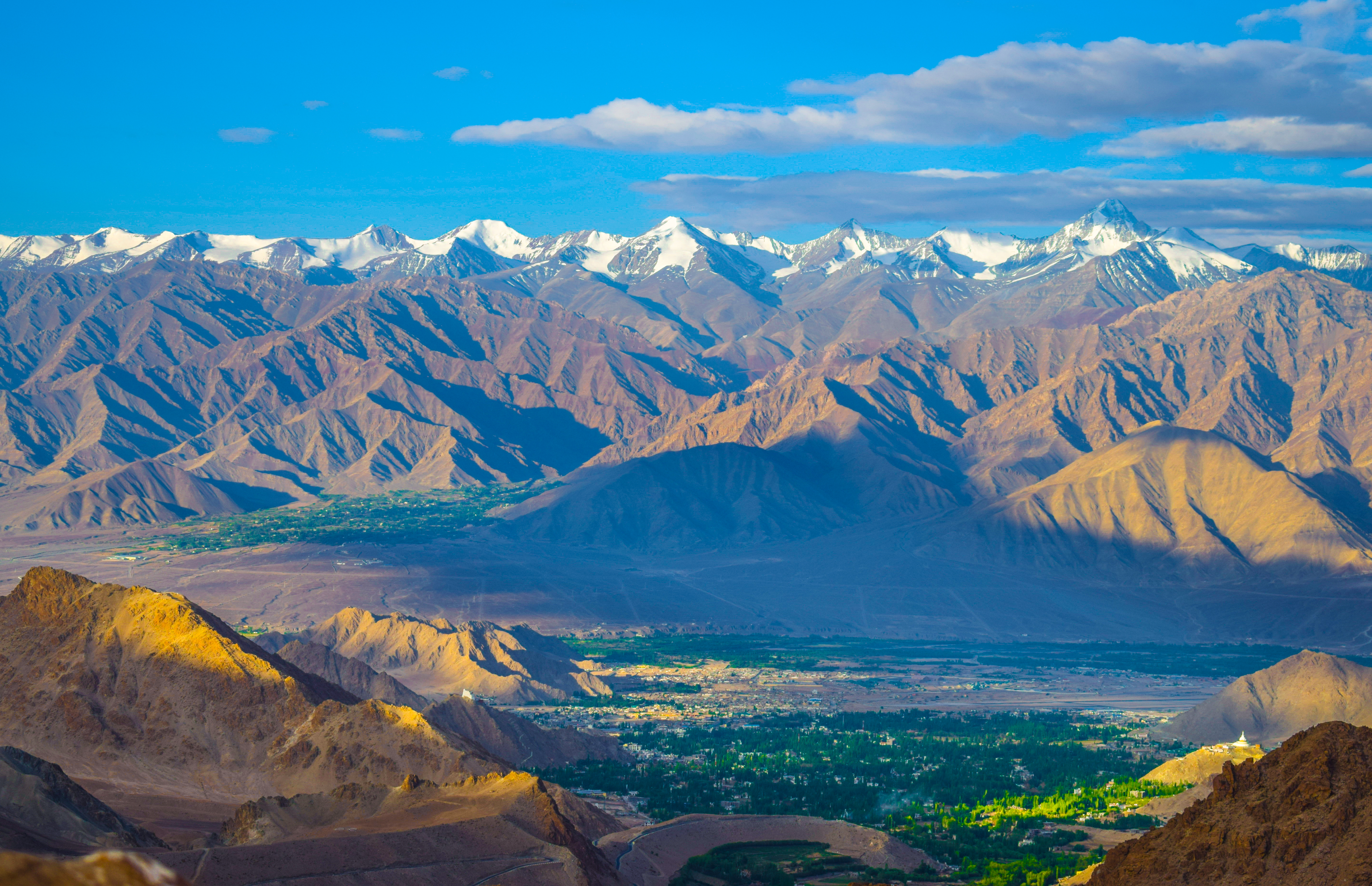
Stok Kangri (the highest peak) seen from Leh.

Stok Kangri (6,153 metres (20,187 ft)) is the highest mountain in the Stok Range of the Zanskar Mountains, a Trans-Himalayan mountain range in the Ladakh region of north India. The peak is located in Hemis National Park, 12 km southwest of the trailhead (3,610 metres (11,844 ft)) at the village of Stok and around 15 km southwest of the city of Leh, the capital of Ladakh.

Despite its high altitude, Stok Kangri is a popular trekking peak and is often climbed as an initial non-technical foray into high altitude mountaineering. However, the difficulty of Stok Kangri is often underestimated and the need to acclimatise before and during the ascent makes Stok Kangri an enduring challenge.

In late July and August, all but the top of the peak may be snow-free. The elevation data was verified by GPS readings from 11 satellites at the summit during a late July 2007 joint Nepalese-US expedition which encountered snow cover for 85% of the final four-hour, four km, 900 metre climb. Another GPS reading provided a elevation of 6,136 metres (20,131 ft). The shortest route to the peak is along the Stok valley, following the Stok Chu to Stok village. This valley's grazing landscape, especially near the village, was devastated by the 2010 Ladakh floods, the most severe in decades.

In December 2019, the All Ladakh Tour Operators Association announced that Stok Kangri is closed for trekking and climbing from 2020 to 2023, due to over-tourism. The interval is meant to give the region a chance to recuperate.

== Ascent ==
The peak is considered non-technical during July–September, but becomes quite technical during the height of winter. Even in summer, novices should be well prepared, with appropriate physical fitness and equipment. The climb is exhausting and requires a good amount of stamina, both physically and mentally. The First official winter ascent was made by a British team in March 2002, Led by Ross Cooper, with Chris Hall, Paul Janlid, Mykl White, and Caroline Williams. At the age of 20 years, Ross Cooper was the youngest expedition leader recorded by the IMF.

It takes two days to reach base camp (4,969 metres (16,302 ft)) from the village of Stok, and it is required to be well acclimatized to the altitude before starting the trek. The summit day lasts 8–14 hours, ascending over 1,000 metres (3,281 ft) from Stok Kangri's base camp to its summit.
