= Hemis National Park =

National park in India

- IUCN category II (national park)
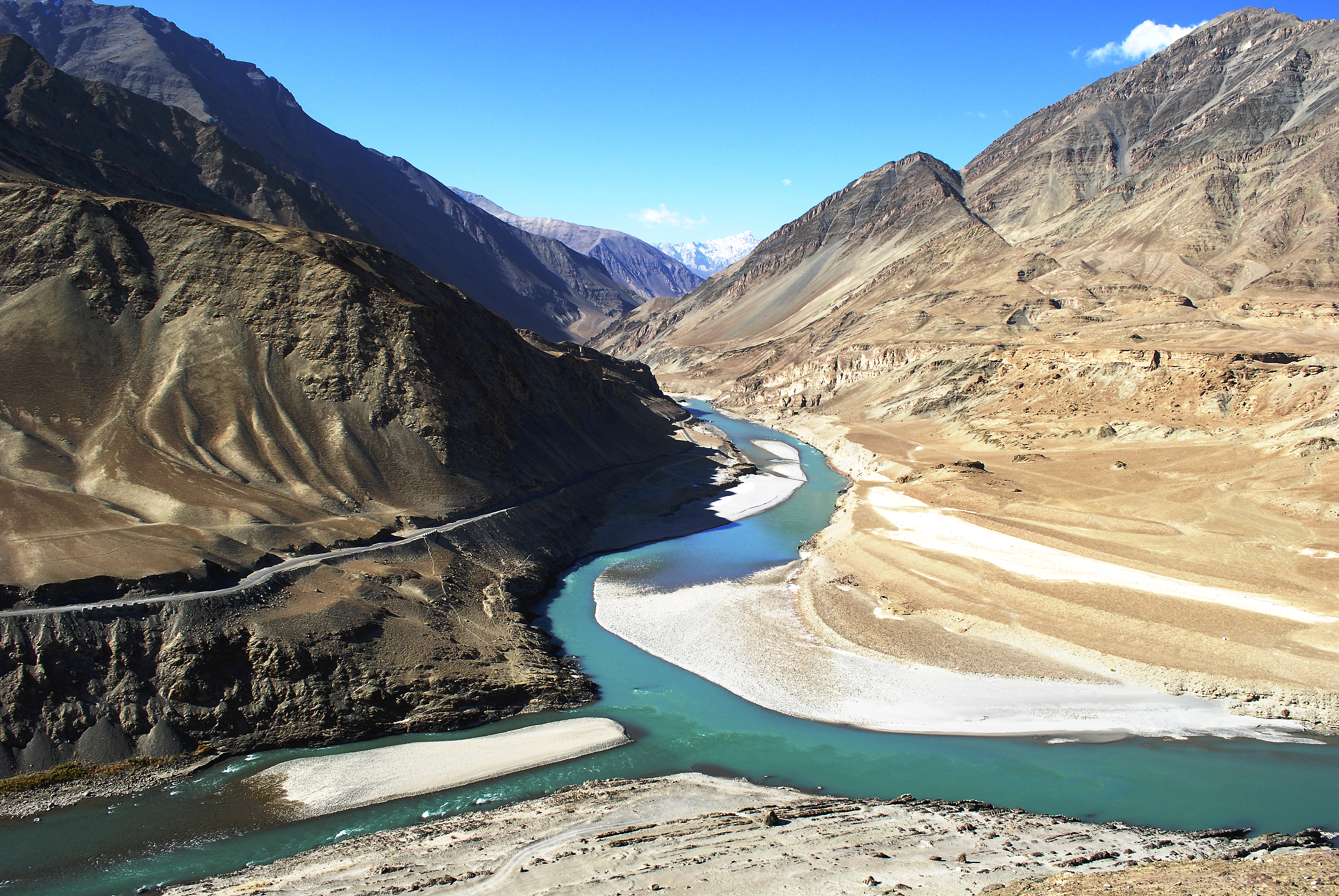
- Confluence of Zanskar and Indus Rivers

- Location within Ladakh Location within India
- Interactive map of Hemis National Park
- Location: Leh district, Ladakh, India
- Nearest city: Leh
- Coordinates: 33°59′N 77°26′E
- Area: 4,400 km^{2} (1,700 sq mi)
- Elevation: 3,000 to 6,000 m (9,800 to 19,700 ft)
- Established: 1981

Hemis National Park, a high-elevation national park near Hemis in the Leh district of Ladakh in India, is located 50 km (31 mi) from Leh town, the capitals of Ladakh. Globally famous for its endangered snow leopards, it has the highest density of them in any protected area in the world. The park is also home to a number of other endangered mammal species.

It is one of the three largest wildlife sanctuaries in Ladakh, others being Karakoram Wildlife Sanctuary, and Changthang Cold Desert Wildlife Sanctuary. It is the largest notified protected area in India (largest national park); the only national park in India north of the Himalayas; and the second largest contiguous protected area in India (after the Nanda Devi Biosphere Reserve and surrounding protected areas). Along with the Changthang Wildlife Sanctuary and North Sikkim's proposed Tso Lhamo Cold Desert Conservation Area, the Hemis National Park is India's one of the three protected Palearctic realm.

== History ==
The park was founded in 1981 by protecting the Rumbak and Markha river catchments, an area of about 600 km^{2} (230 sq mi). It grew in 1988 to around 3,350 km^{2} (1,290 sq mi), by incorporating neighbouring lands, before increasing in 1990 to 4,400 km^{2} (1,700 sq mi), and is the largest national park in South Asia.

== Geography ==
The park is bounded on the north by the banks of the Indus River, and includes the catchments of Markha and Rumbak rivers, and parts of the Zanskar Range. The park lies within the Karakoram-West Tibetan Plateau alpine steppe ecoregion, and contains pine forests, alpine shrublands and meadows, and alpine tundra vegetation.

Hemis National Park lies entirely within the Zanskar area of India-administered Ladakh. Its boundaries, defined by the Wildlife Institute of India (WII), are:

- Southern boundary: run from Tetha to Padum;
- Eastern boundary: from Padum along the Nimmu–Padum–Darcha road till Nimmu (on NH-1);
- Northern boundary: From Nimmu run along NH-1 till Karu (on NH-3).
- Western boundary: then from Karu run southward along NH-3 till Tetha.

== Ecology ==
=== Fauna ===
Mountain weasel (Mustela altaica)

16 mammal species and 73 bird species have been recorded in the park so far.

The park is home to a viable breeding population of about 200 snow leopards, especially in the Rumbak catchment area. The prey base for the apex predator in the Central Asian Highlands is primarily supported in Hemis by Argali (Great Tibetan Sheep), Bharal (Blue Sheep), Shapu (Ladakhi Urial), and livestock. A small population of the Asiatic ibex is also present in Hemis. Hemis is the only refuge in India containing the Shapu.

The Tibetan wolf, the Eurasian brown bear (endangered in India), and the red fox are also present in Hemis. Small mammals include the Himalayan marmot, mountain weasel and the Himalayan mouse hare.

Among birds of prey noted here are Himalayan and Trans-Himalayan birds of prey: the golden eagle, lammergeier vulture, and Himalayan griffon vulture. The Rumbak Valley offers opportunities for birdwatching, including several Tibetan species not common in other parts of India. Birds present here include brown accentor, robin accentor, Tickell's leaf warbler, streaked rosefinch, black-winged snowfinch, chukar, Blyth's swift, red-billed chough, Himalayan snowcock, and the fire-fronted serin.

=== Flora ===
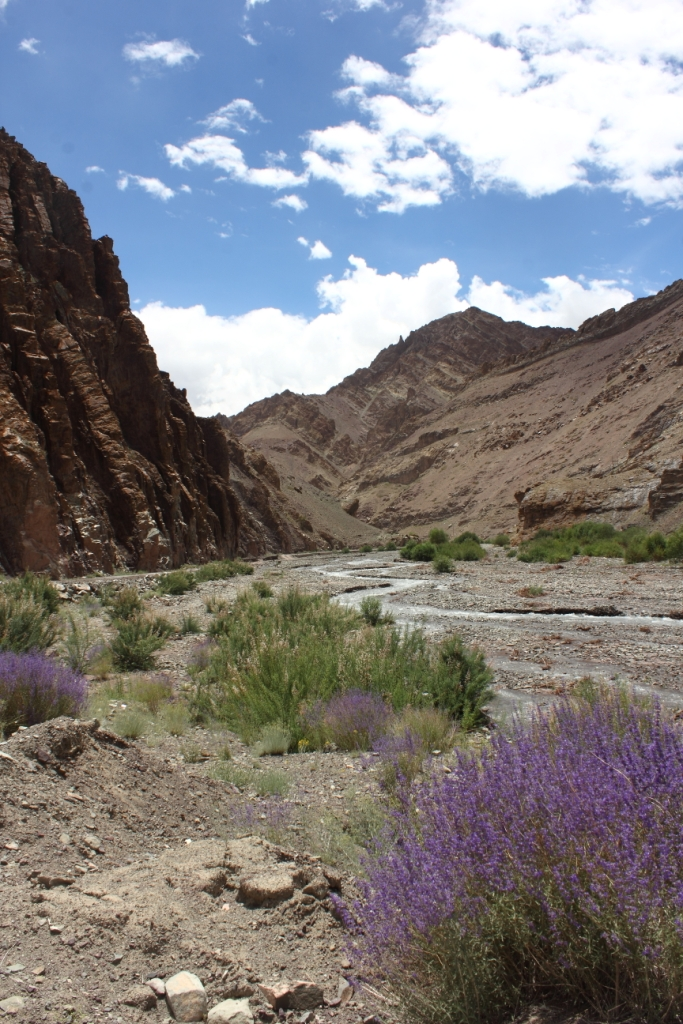
Himalayan lavender (Perovskia atriplicifolia)

This region is in the rain shadow of the Himalayas, and does not receive much precipitation. Hence, dry forests of juniper, Populus - Salix forests, subalpine dry birch - fir are present at lower elevations. Alpine and steppe trees are predominantly found here. These trees and shrubs are spread across the valley bottoms. Since the upper mountain slopes are moist, this area is characterized by alpine vegetation including Anemone, Gentiana, Thalictrum, Lloydia, Veronica, Delphinum, Carex and Kobresia. The other parts of the park support steppe vegetation which is dominated by Caragana, Artemisia, Stachys, and Ephedra, present along the lower river courses. A study conducted by CP Kala reports 15 rare and endangered medicinal plants growing in the park, which include Acantholimon lycopodioides, Arnebia euchroma, Artemisia maritima, Bergenia stracheyi, Ephedra gerardiana, Ferula jaeschkeana, and Hyoscyamus niger.

== Environmental issues ==
Over 1,600 people live inside the park boundaries, mostly pastoralists raising poultry, goats, and sheep. This results in considerable animal-human conflict within the region. Snow leopards prey on livestock, sometimes killing several animals from a single flock in one hunt. This has been attributed to the overgrazing of livestock. Crop damage caused by bharal has also been seen.

The Department of Wildlife Protection, Government of Ladakh is the custodian of the park. Any activity in the park is prohibited unless special permission is obtained from the Chief Wildlife Warden. The department has initiated many projects for biodiversity conservation and rural livelihood improvement, such as:

- Project Snow Leopard for Conserving the entire Himalayan biosphere, initiated in 2004 and formally launched on 20 February 2009.
- Ladakh Eco tourism Project
- Ladakh Homestays program for providing tourists accommodation in local villagers' residences (source of additional income).
- Nature Guide Training for the educated unemployed youth.
- Eco Cafe for the women Help Group to run the cafe and sell the local handicraft products to the tourist.
- Creation of a no-grazing zone for domestic livestock
- Predator-proofing livestock pens in the area

== Tourism ==
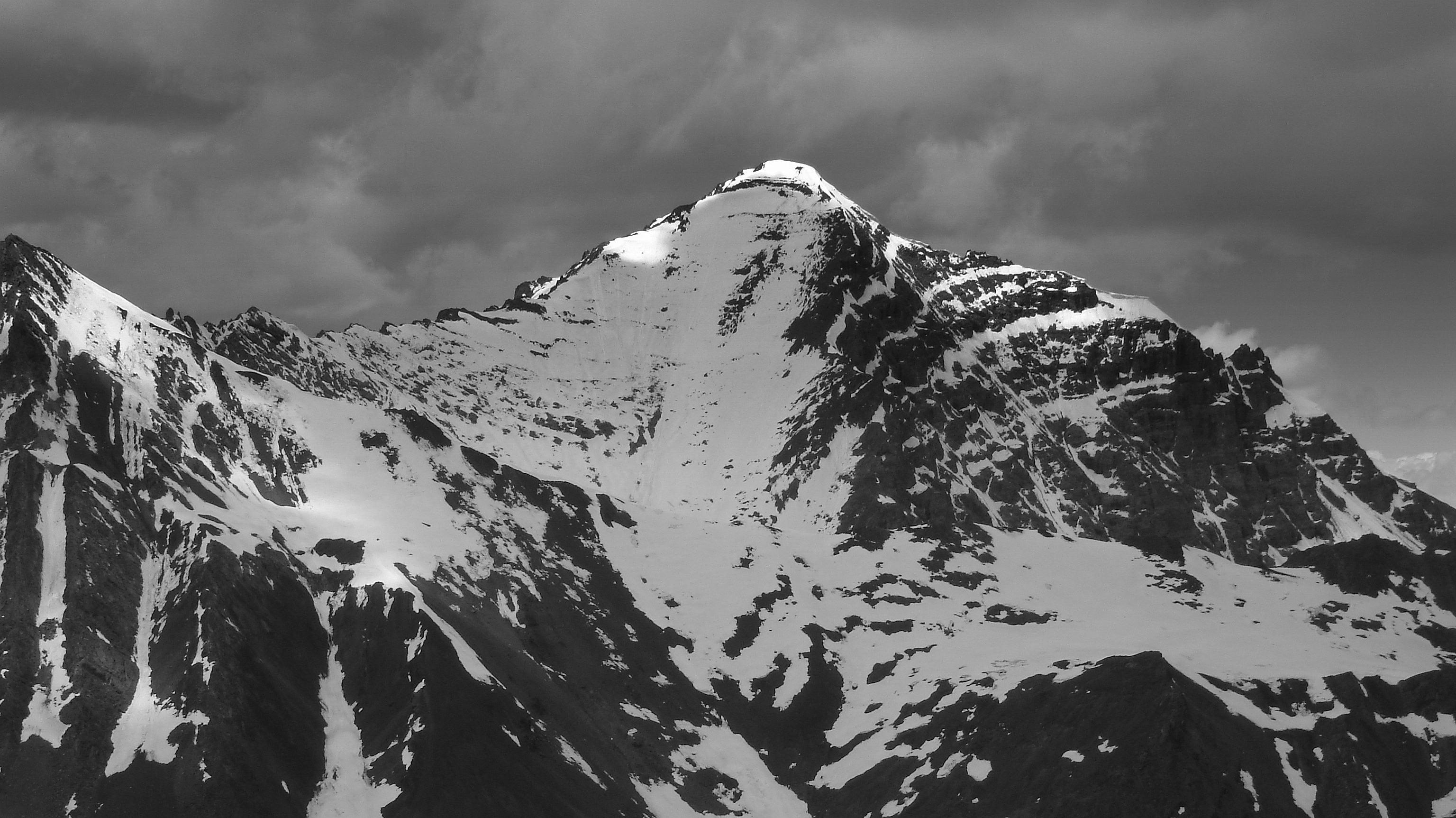
Stok Kangri peak

The historic Hemis Monastery is home to the 2-days long annual "Hemis Tsechu Festival" usually held every summer in June-July. Lodging is restricted to backcountry camps and homestays initiated by the Snow Leopard Conservancy India Trust (SLC-IT) in 2000. Hemis was a destination and via point on the silk routes to Tibet.

The park has also become popular among tourists who want to observe the snow leopard. The best season for spotting snow leopards is in late winter.

=== Tibetan Buddhist monasteries ===
Over 1,600 people live inside the park presently. The park houses numerous Tibetan gompas and holy chortens within its boundaries. These include the famous 400-year-old Hemis Monastery, a place of pilgrimage for Tibetan Buddhists. However, in the late 19th and early 20th century, the monastery attracted some attention due to the writings of Nicolas Notovitch, a Russian aristocrat and journalist, who claimed that Jesus had spent the missing years of his life in Tibet and Ladakh, specifically in Hemis.

=== Mountaineering ===
The Hemis National Park is also famous for mountaineering expeditions. The Stok Kangri peak (6,153 metres (20,187 ft)) and the Kang Yatse peak (elevation 6,496 metres (21,312 ft)) are the two mountains which attract the highest number of climbers every year. and supported and managed by the local government.

=== Trekking ===
The park offers a number of routes for trekking from mid-June to mid-October; some of these trekking routes are among the most popular in Ladakh. This includes the Markha valley trek and the trek from Spituk to Stok over the Ganda La pass.

Markha valley-Ganda La-Leh treks

Ganda La
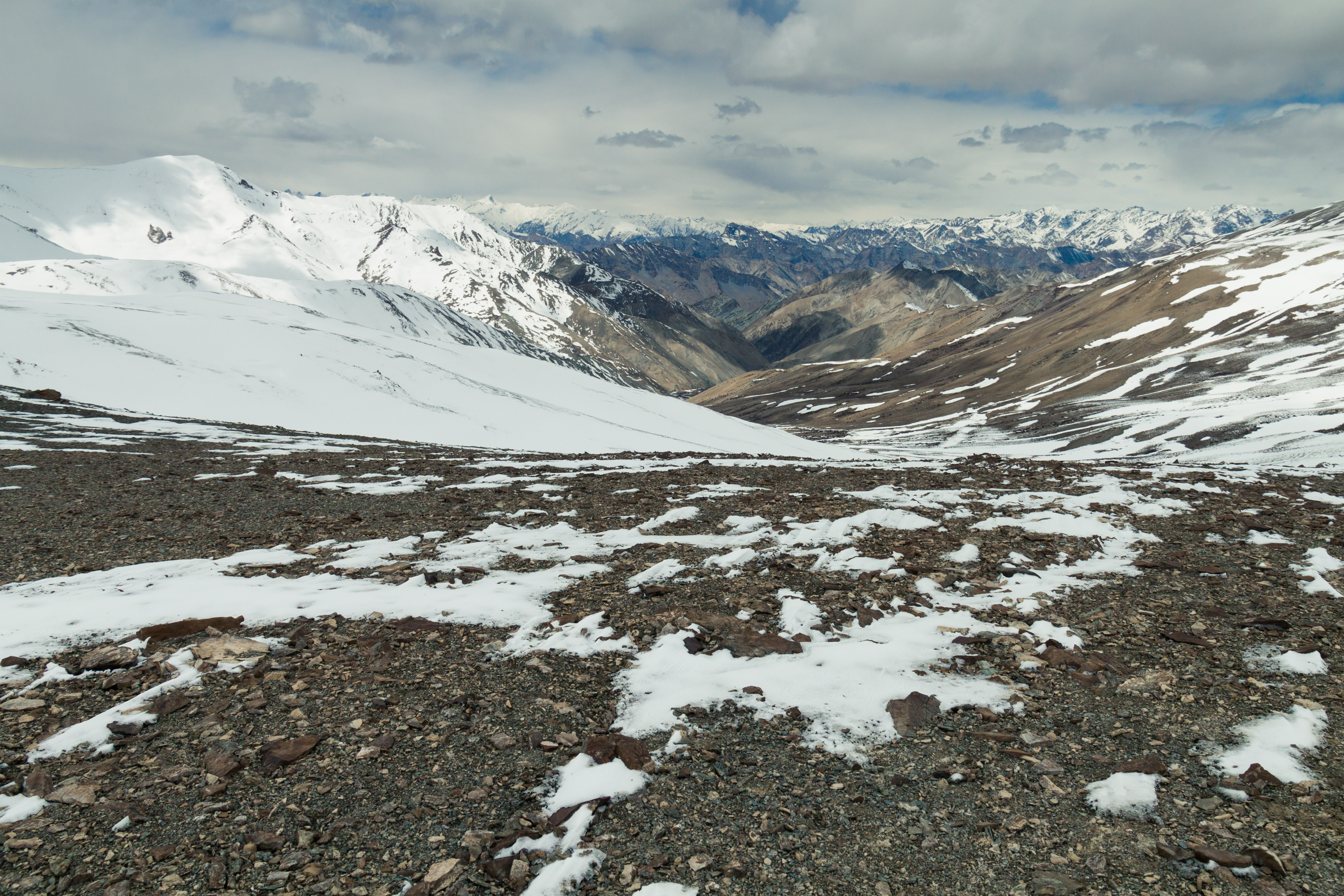
- The top of Ganda La (winter pass); the way to Skiu
- Interactive map of Ganda La
- Elevation: 4,980 metres (16,340 ft)

Third Approach
- Location: India
- Range: Himalaya

The Markha valley to Leh trek crosses the Ganda La pass on the section between Rumbak and Skiu villages, which is usually done over 2 days. The other pass on the trek is the Gongmaru La (Kongmaru La). Ganda La (also called the "Kanda La", 34°2′29.62″N 77°21′45.42″E), a high mountain pass located at around 4980 metres above sea level and 23 km (14 miles) south-west of Leh in Ladakh, lies within the Hemis National Park, and connects the Markha valley villages to Leh town. It is regularly used by local people. The summer pass is open from June, and the winter pass (half kilometre north-west of summer pass) is open from late April.

=== Check posts at the park boundaries ===
Since 2019, ALTOA (All Ladakh Tour Operator Association) and the Department of Wildlife Protection have set up check posts at each entrance of the Hemis National Park. These check posts are located at Skiu village, Zingchen, and Shang Sumdo. Beyond these check posts, only motorized vehicles used by villagers who live inside the park are allowed. Tourists are not allowed to use motorized vehicles inside the park, they shall walk. Tourists also need to pay a fee (called “wildlife fee”) when entering the park.

== Transport ==
- Nearest airport: Leh Kushok Bakula Rimpochee Airport at Leh about 5 km (3.1 miles) north of the Hemis National Park boundary.
- Nearest highway: NH1 Srinagar-Kargil-Leh Highway (north of the park), NH3 Leh-Manali Highway (north and east of the park), Nimmu–Padum–Darcha road (south of the park), and NH301 Padum-Pensi La-Kargil Highway (southwest of the park). There is no metalled road in Hemis National Park. However, a few rough roads enable local people to reach their villages. There is a rough road connecting Chilling bridge to Skiu village in the Markha valley and another one connecting Spituk to Zingchen and Rumbak village. On Hemis side, there is a road connecting Martselang to Shang Sumdo. In order to protect the national park and its tourism-related activities (trekking, homestays, wildlife spotting), the in inhabitants of the region demanded in 2018 a regulation of vehicle access to the park.
- Nearest town: There are quite a few villages, and gompas (monasteries) inside the national park
- Nearest city: Leh 10 km (6.2 miles) to the north and Padum 10 km (6.2 miles) southwest of the park.

== In culture ==
The national park, monastery and the Changthang Wildlife Sanctuary were prominently featured in the award-winning documentary Riding Solo to the Top of the World.

== See also ==
- Changthang Cold Desert Wildlife Sanctuary, east of Hemis National Park
- Karakorum Wildlife Sanctuary, north of Hemis National Park
- Geography of Ladakh
- Tourism in Ladakh

== Bibliography ==
- Management Plan Hemis High Altitude National Park, Jigmet Takpa IFS and Saleem Ul Haq.
- Hemis High Altitude National Park-Government of Jammu and Kashmir, Department of Wildlife Protection, Wildlife Division(LAHDC) Leh-Ladakh
- Chettri, Nakul. 2003.
- Namgail, T., Fox, J.L. & Bhatnagar, Y.V. (2004). Habitat segregation between sympatric Tibetan argali Ovis ammon hodgsoni and blue sheep Pseudois nayaur in the Indian Trans-Himalaya. Journal of Zoology (London), 262: 57-63.
- Ladakh: The Land and the People, By Prem Singh Jina. Published by Indus Publishing, 1996 (ISBN 8173870578), (ISBN 9788173870576)
