= Skiu-Kaya =

- Village
- Location within Ladakh Location within India
- Coordinates: 33.97°N 77.26°E
- Country: India
- Union Territory: Ladakh
- District: Leh

Languages
  - Official: Ladakhi
- Time zone: UTC+5:30 (IST)
- PIN: 194101

Skiu (also Sku and Skyu) and Kaya (elev. 3500 m) are adjacent villages in the Markha River valley in Ladakh, India. The villages contain 11 and 12 households, respectively; the boundary between the villages is not clearly defined. They lie within the Hemis National Park.

Wheat and vegetables are cultivated by villagers, who also harvest wild seabuckthorn berries.

Skiu and Kaya each have a Buddhist monastery (gompa). The monastery at Skiu was constructed in the 11th century; Rinchen Zangpo laid its foundation.

== See also ==
- List of buddhist monasteries in Ladakh
- Geography of Ladakh
- Tourism in Ladakh
