= Charbagh Kangri =

Mountain peak

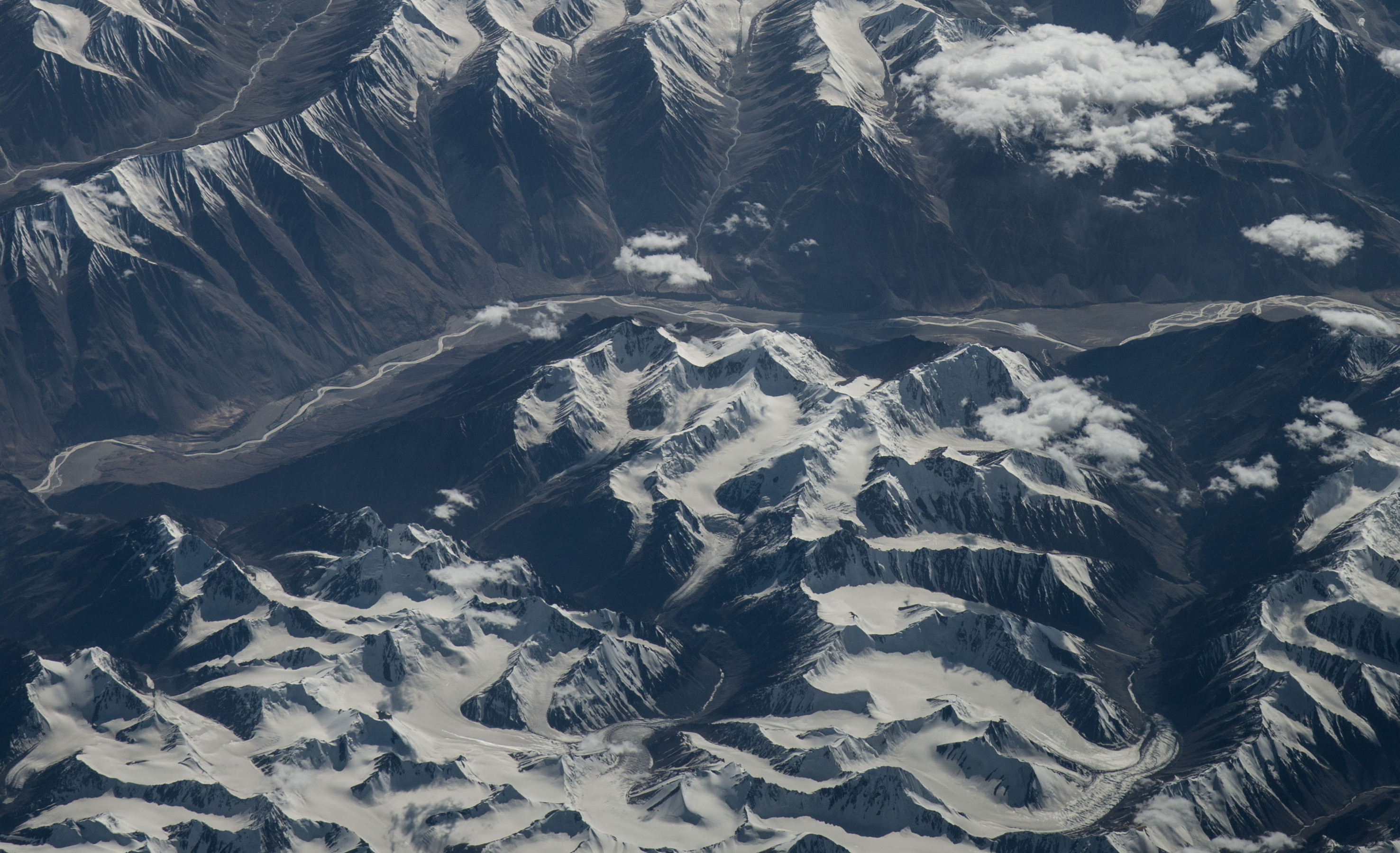
- Charbagh Kangri summits, Shyok River and side valleys

Highest point
- Elevation: 6,698 m (21,975 ft)
- Prominence: 1,349 m (4,426 ft)
- Coordinates: 34°31′33.852″N 78°17′14.017″E

Geography
- Location within India Location within Ladakh
- Location: Aksai Chin/Ladakh

Climbing
- First ascent: No Records

Charbagh Kangri is a mountain peak located at 6,698m (21 975 ft) above sea level in the easternmost subrange of the Karakoram range in India.

== Location ==
The peak is located near the vicinity of Line of Actual Control which exists between Aksai Chin (China) and the Union territory of Ladakh (India). The prominence is 1,349m/4,426 ft. It can be reached from Rongdu village, Diskit-Nubra Valley.
