= List of institutions of higher education in Ladakh =

There are three recognised universities in the Indian Union territory of Ladakh: one central university, one state university and one deemed-to-be university. Several government degree colleges and technical institutions are also present.

== Colleges ==
College	Location	Type	Established
Eliezer Joldan Memorial College	Leh, Leh district	Government	1994
Government Degree College, Kargil	Kargil, Kargil district	Government	1995
Government Degree College, Nubra	Diskit, Nubra district	Government	2011
Government Degree College, Zanskar	Padum, Zanskar district	Government	2013
Government Degree College, Drass	Drass, Drass district	Government	2018
Government Degree College, Khaltse	Khaltse, Sham district	Government	2019

=== College campuses ===
Institution	Location	Type	Established
Government Degree College Kargil, Sankoo Campus	Sankoo, Sankoo district	Government college campus	2022

=== Technical institutions ===
Institution	Location	Type	Established
Government Polytechnic College, Leh	Choglamsar, Leh district	Government polytechnic	2005
Government Polytechnic College, Kargil	Khurbathang, Kargil district	Government polytechnic	2005

=== Medical Institutions ===
Institution	Location	Type	Status
Government Medical College, Leh	Spituk Pharka, Leh district	Government medical college	Approved; scheduled to commence operations in the 2027–28 academic year

== Universities ==
=== Central universities ===
University	Location	Type	Founded
Sindhu Central University	Khaltsi, Sham district	Public	2021

=== State universities ===
University	Location	Type	Founded
University of Ladakh	Leh and Kargil	Public	2018

=== Deemed-to-be universities ===
University	Location	Type	Founded
Central Institute of Buddhist Studies	Choglamsar, Leh district	Deemed-to-be University	1959 (Deemed status: 2016)

== Research institutions and facilities ==
Institution	Location	Parent organisation	Type
Central Arid Zone Research Institute (Regional Research Stations)	Stakna, Leh district	Indian Council of Agricultural Research	Government agricultural research station
Defence Institute of High Altitude Research	Leh, Leh district	Defence Research and Development Organisation	Government defence research institute
Indian Astronomical Observatory	Hanle, Changthang district	Indian Institute of Astrophysics	Astronomical research observatory
