= Karu, Ladakh =

Village in Ladakh, India

Kharu Karu
- Town
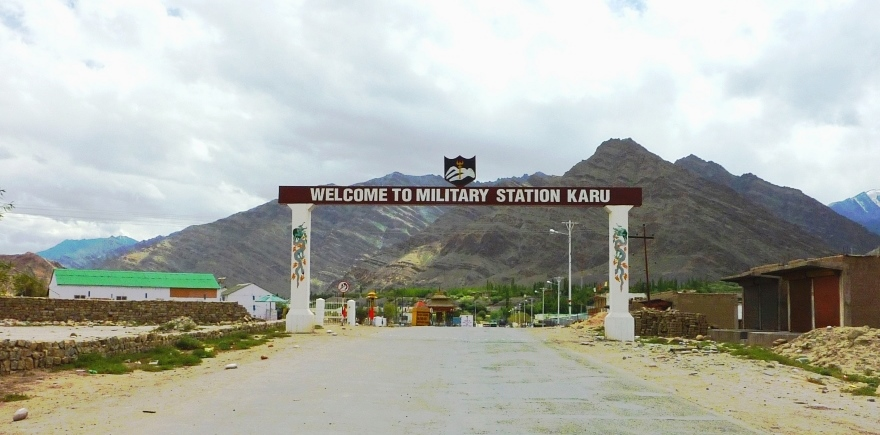
- Military Station at Karu

- Location in Ladakh, India Kharu (India)
- Coordinates: 33°56′31″N 77°45′51″E
- Country: India
- Union Territory: Ladakh
- District: Leh
- Tehsil: Kharu

Languages
  - Official: Ladakhi, English
- Time zone: UTC+5:30 (IST)
- Census code: 892

Kharu (Wylie: mkhar bu, THL: khar bu) also spelt Karu, is a town, subdivision, tehsil, block, tourist station and military base on the bank of Indus River in the Leh district of Union territory of Ladakh in India. It is located 34 km southeast of Leh on Leh-Manali Highway and under-construction Bhanupli–Leh line. Karu is one of the important railway station and military's railway logistics hub on the under construction Bhanupli–Leh line of Indian Railway. Karu is an important transit point where several strategic and important road arterial and feeder routes of India-China Border Roads meet, such as Leh-Manali Highway, Leh-Nyoma road, Hamis-Karo-Pangong Tso road, etc.

== Transport ==
Karu, with a loop line for military logistics, will be a civilian passenger station on the under-construction Bhanupli–Leh line. Karu lies on the NH-3. Nearest airport, Kushok Bakula Rimpochee Airport, is at Leh.

== Tourism ==
Karu town, located at 3500 m above sea level, with ATM, internet access (BSNL, guesthouses, petrol station and tourist facilities, etc. is one of the base for exploring the Hemis Monastery, high altitude Hemis National Park, Chang La motorable pass, Ke La pass, etc. It is a popular stop and melting pot for the tourists, bikers, native tribes, military personnels, etc. Tourists usually flock here during warmer months from June to October.

== Administration ==
Important villages in Karu block are, Karu, Hemis, Upshi, Meroo, Changa, etc.

== Culture ==
Native tribe practice the Tibetan Buddhism.

== Education ==
The well-known "Karu Army Goodwill Public School" was established in 1998 for the locals by the Tangtse Brigade of XIV Corps of the Indian Army.

== Karu Military Station ==
Karu is also home to a logistics base of Indian Military. To cater for the military logistics, the Bilaspur–Leh rail line passing through will have a railway station for passengers at Karu as well as a loop line for the exclusive use of military logistics, loading and unloading. Other 4 such dedicated loop lines for military logistics on this rail line will be at Sissu, Debring, Leh and Sesharthang.

== See also ==
- Kharoo
- Geography of Ladakh
- Tourism in Ladakh
