= Chuchot Gongma =

Chuchot
- Village
- Location in Ladakh Chuchot (India)
- Coordinates: 34.0397120°N 77.6434728°E
- Country: India
- Union Territory: Ladakh
- District: Leh
- Tehsil: Chushot

Population (2011)
  - Total: 1,836
- Time zone: UTC+5:30 (IST)
- Census code: 867

Chuchot Gongma is a village-group and the headquarter of Chushot block and tehsil in the Leh district of Ladakh, India. It is located in the Chushot tehsil. This village Chuchot is divided into three villages: Yokma, Shamma and Chuchot Gongma. Chuchot village is the longest village of ladakh. It starts from Choglamsar and stretches up to Stakna by the bank of the Indus River, and this river is the source of water for irrigating fields.

People here rear cattle and harvest fields. This village, located in ladakh, comes under Leh district and is 13 km South of Leh main town. This village is surrounded by chains of mountain range with the village itself being located on the bank of the historically famous Indus River. Farther away from the bank, the other side of the village has vast barren lands.

Polo and archery are the most common sports. The village grows a large amount of wild sea buckthorn, known for its therapeutic, anti-carsenic, anti-aging antibacterial, anti-inflammatory properties.

== Demographics ==
According to the 2011 census of India, Chuchot Gongma has 368 households. The effective literacy rate (i.e. the literacy rate of population excluding children aged 6 and below) is 79.75%.

Demographics (2011 Census)
| | Total | Male | Female |
|---|---|---|---|
| Population | 1836 | 897 | 939 |
| Children aged below 6 years | 221 | 110 | 111 |
| Scheduled caste | 0 | 0 | 0 |
| Scheduled tribe | 1804 | 880 | 924 |
| Literates | 1288 | 721 | 567 |
| Workers (all) | 1065 | 522 | 543 |
| Main workers (total) | 437 | 373 | 64 |
| Main workers: Cultivators | 75 | 71 | 4 |
| Main workers: Agricultural labourers | 2 | 2 | 0 |
| Main workers: Household industry workers | 0 | 0 | 0 |
| Main workers: Other | 360 | 300 | 60 |
| Marginal workers (total) | 628 | 149 | 479 |
| Marginal workers: Cultivators | 294 | 39 | 255 |
| Marginal workers: Agricultural labourers | 32 | 26 | 6 |
| Marginal workers: Household industry workers | 23 | 2 | 21 |
| Marginal workers: Others | 279 | 82 | 197 |
| Non-workers | 771 | 375 | 396 |
