= Shangzhou =

Shangzhou may refer to:

- Shangzhou District, a district of Shangluo, Shaanxi, China
- Shangzhou Town, a town in Yibin County, Sichuan, China

== See also ==
- Di Xin (1105 BC – 1046 BC), known by the pejorative title "King Zhou of Shang", king of Shang dynasty, sometimes written as "Shang Zhou" (商紂)
- Shang (disambiguation)
