= Matselang =

- Village
- Location in Ladakh, India Matselang (India)
- Coordinates: 33.48°N 77.82°E
- Country: India
- Union Territory: Ladakh
- District: Leh
- Tehsil: Kharu
- Elevation: 5,461 m (17,917 ft)

Population (2011)
  - Total: 381

Languages
  - Official: Hindi, English
- Time zone: UTC+5:30 (IST)
- PIN: 194201
- Census code: 893

Matselang is a village in the Leh district of Ladakh, India. It is located in the Kharu tehsil.

== Demographics ==
According to the 2011 census of India, Matselang has 69 households. The effective literacy rate (i.e. the literacy rate of population excluding children aged 6 and below) is 71.85%.

Demographics (2011 Census)
	Total	Male	Female
Population	381	175	206
Children aged below 6 years	40	19	21
Scheduled caste	0	0	0
Scheduled tribe	379	174	205
Literates	245	125	120
Workers (all)	143	92	51
Main workers (total)	96	55	41
Main workers: Cultivators	1	0	1
Main workers: Agricultural labourers	0	0	0
Main workers: Household industry workers	2	2	0
Main workers: Other	93	53	40
Marginal workers (total)	47	37	10
Marginal workers: Cultivators	26	25	1
Marginal workers: Agricultural labourers	2	2	0
Marginal workers: Household industry workers	0	0	0
Marginal workers: Others	19	10	9
Non-workers	238	83	155
