= Igoo =

- Village
- Location in Ladakh, India Igoo (India)
- Coordinates: 33°54′01″N 77°48′59″E
- Country: India
- Union Territory: Ladakh
- District: Leh
- Tehsil: Kharu

Population (2011)
  - Total: 1,103

Languages
  - Official: Hindi, English
- Time zone: UTC+5:30 (IST)
- Census code: 881

Igoo is a village in the Leh district of Ladakh, India. It is located in the Kharu tehsil.

== Demographics ==
According to the 2011 census of India, Igoo has 238 households. The effective literacy rate (i.e. the literacy rate of population excluding children aged 6 and below) is 62.2%.

Demographics (2011 Census)
	Total	Male	Female
Population	1103	505	598
Children aged below 6 years	119	59	60
Scheduled caste	0	0	0
Scheduled tribe	1103	505	598
Literates	612	320	292
Workers (all)	627	326	301
Main workers (total)	561	283	278
Main workers: Cultivators	415	179	236
Main workers: Agricultural labourers	0	0	0
Main workers: Household industry workers	0	0	0
Main workers: Other	146	104	42
Marginal workers (total)	66	43	23
Marginal workers: Cultivators	10	7	3
Marginal workers: Agricultural labourers	1	1	0
Marginal workers: Household industry workers	0	0	0
Marginal workers: Others	55	35	20
Non-workers	476	179	297
