= Chemrey =

Chemrey Chemdey
- Village
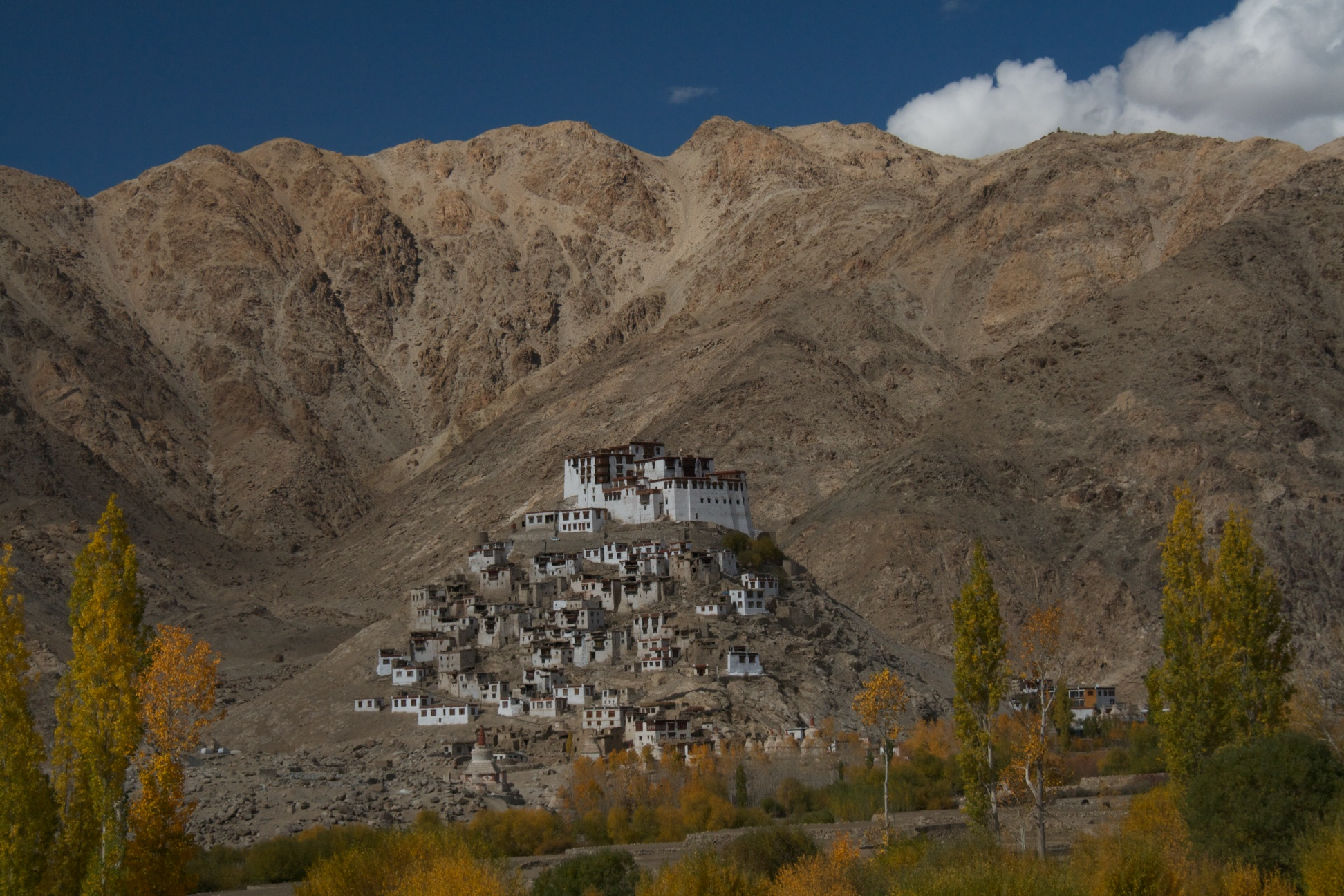
- Chemrey Monastery

- Location in Ladakh, India Chemrey (India)
- Coordinates: 33.97°N 77.80°E
- Country: India
- Union Territory: Ladakh
- District: Leh
- Tehsil: Kharu

Population (2011)
  - Total: 6,222
- Time zone: UTC+5:30 (IST)
- Census code: 871

Chemrey (also known as Chemdey) is a village in the Leh district of Ladakh, India. It is located in the Kharu tehsil. The Chemrey Monastery is located in this village.

== Demographics ==
According to the 2011 census of India, Chemrey has 353 households. The effective literacy rate (i.e. the literacy rate of population excluding children aged 6 and below) is 91.12%.

Demographics (2011 Census)
	Total	Male	Female
Population	6222	5450	772
Children aged below 6 years	130	56	74
Scheduled caste	0	0	0
Scheduled tribe	1846	1177	669
Literates	5551	5143	408
Workers (all)	5391	5179	212
Main workers (total)	5123	4967	156
Main workers: Cultivators	146	139	7
Main workers: Agricultural labourers	30	18	12
Main workers: Household industry workers	0	0	0
Main workers: Other	4947	4810	137
Marginal workers (total)	268	212	56
Marginal workers: Cultivators	50	36	14
Marginal workers: Agricultural labourers	7	2	5
Marginal workers: Household industry workers	1	1	0
Marginal workers: Others	210	173	37
Non-workers	831	271	560
