= Xuzhou, Yibin =

Xuzhou 叙州区
- District
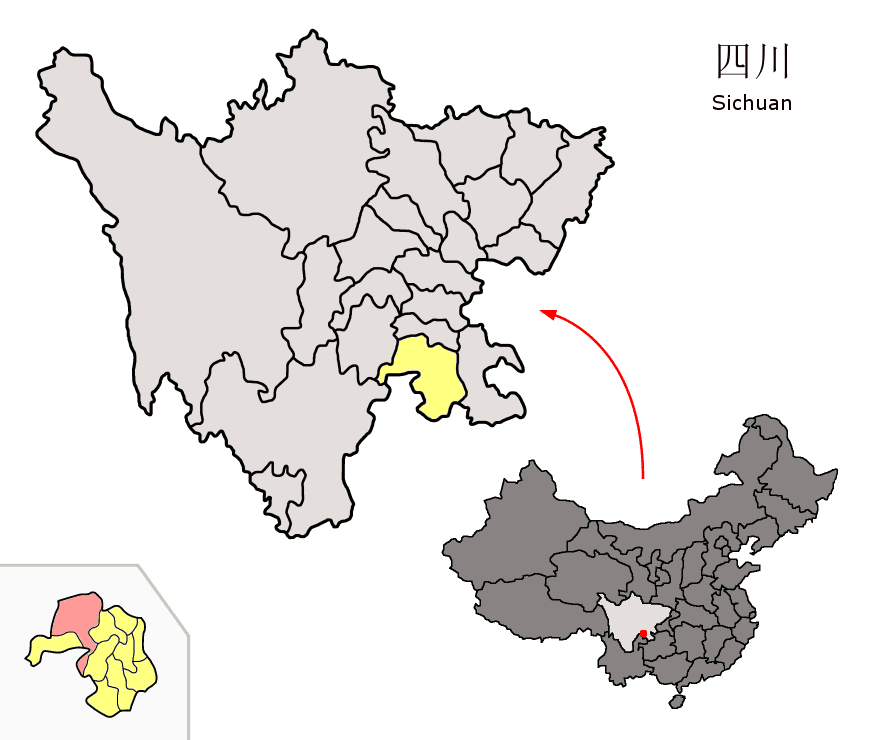
- Location of Xuzhou District (red) within Yibin City (yellow) and Sichuan
- Coordinates: 28°43′05″N 104°32′46″E
- Country: China
- Province: Sichuan
- Prefecture-level city: Yibin

Area
  - Total: 3,034 km^{2} (1,171 sq mi)

Population (2020 census)
  - Total: 938,157
  - Density: 309.2/km^{2} (800.9/sq mi)
- Time zone: UTC+8 (China Standard)

Xuzhou District (simplified Chinese: 叙州区; traditional Chinese: 敘州區; pinyin: Xùzhōu Qū), formerly Yibin County (宜宾县) is a district and the seat of the city of Yibin, Sichuan Province, China, bordering Yunnan province to the south. It is the northernmost county-level division of Yibin.

== Administrative divisions ==
Xuzhou District comprises 3 subdistricts, 12 towns and 2 townships:

subdistricts

- Baixi 柏溪街道
- Nan'an 南岸街道
- Zhaochang 赵场街道

towns

- Nanguang 南广镇
- Guanyin 观音镇
- Hengjiang 横江镇
- Liujia 柳嘉镇
- Nixi 泥溪镇
- Juexi 蕨溪镇
- Shangzhou 商州镇
- Gaochang 高场镇
- Anbian 安边镇
- Shuanglong 双龙镇
- Heshi 合什镇
- Zhanghai 樟海镇

townships

- Longchi 龙池乡
- Fengyi 凤仪乡
