= Gya =

Gya or GYA may refer to:

- bya, symbol for gigayears ago, a unit of time equal to a billion years before present
- Gya, symbol for the gray, a unit of radiation exposure, equal to 100 roentgen
- Gya, Ladakh, a village in India
- Global Young Academy, an association of early-career scientists
- Guayaramerín Airport, an airport in Bolivia
- Gulf Yachting Association, a boating organization on the United States coast along the Gulf of Mexico
