= Langokor =

- Village
- Country: India
- Union Territory: Ladakh
- District: Leh
- Tehsil: Kharu

Population (2011)
  - Total: 87

Languages
  - Official: Hindi, English
- Time zone: UTC+5:30 (IST)
- 2011 census code: 870

Langokor or Langkor is a village in the Leh district of Ladakh, India. It is located in the Kharu tehsil.

== Demographics ==
According to the 2011 census of India, Langokor has 16 households. The effective literacy rate (i.e. the literacy rate of population excluding children aged 6 and below) is 67.86%.

Demographics (2011 Census)
	Total	Male	Female
Population	87	44	43
Children aged below 6 years	3	1	2
Scheduled caste	0	0	0
Scheduled tribe	87	44	43
Literates	57	34	23
Workers (all)	51	26	25
Main workers (total)	51	26	25
Main workers: Cultivators	37	16	21
Main workers: Agricultural labourers	3	1	2
Main workers: Household industry workers	0	0	0
Main workers: Other	11	9	2
Marginal workers (total)	0	0	0
Marginal workers: Cultivators	0	0	0
Marginal workers: Agricultural labourers	0	0	0
Marginal workers: Household industry workers	0	0	0
Marginal workers: Others	0	0	0
Non-workers	36	18	18
