= Phuktse =

- Village
- Country: India
- Union Territory: Ladakh
- District: Leh
- Tehsil: Kharu

Population (2011)
  - Total: 316
- Time zone: UTC+5:30 (IST)
- Census code: 877

Phuktse or Phuktsay is a village in the Leh district of Ladakh, India. It is located in the Kharu tehsil.

== Demographics ==
According to the 2011 census of India, Phuktse has 60 households. The effective literacy rate (i.e. the literacy rate of population excluding children aged 6 and below) is 56.83%.

Demographics (2011 Census)
	Total	Male	Female
Population	316	142	174
Children aged below 6 years	45	19	26
Scheduled caste	0	0	0
Scheduled tribe	312	139	173
Literates	154	92	62
Workers (all)	188	83	105
Main workers (total)	136	47	89
Main workers: Cultivators	117	39	78
Main workers: Agricultural labourers	2	1	1
Main workers: Household industry workers	4	1	3
Main workers: Other	13	6	7
Marginal workers (total)	52	36	16
Marginal workers: Cultivators	2	1	1
Marginal workers: Agricultural labourers	35	23	12
Marginal workers: Household industry workers	1	0	1
Marginal workers: Others	14	12	2
Non-workers	128	59	69
