= Nang =

Nang or nangs may refer to:

- Nang County, Nyingchi, Tibet, China
- Nang yai, a form of shadow play
- Nang!, a general interest magazine
- Nang, a slang term for nitrous oxide (N_{2}O), also known as laughing gas, when used as a recreational drug. Or less commonly for whipped-cream chargers.
- Nang, Leh, a village in Ladakh, India
- "Nangs", a Tame Impala song in the 2015 album Currents
- Naan (Chinese:馕, pinyin:náng), a leavened, oven-baked or tawa-fried flatbread.

People named Nang:

- Che Nang (14th century), Annamese vassal king of Champa
- Nang Keo Phimpha (14th century), Laotian ruler
- Philibert Nang (born 1967), Gabonese mathematician
