= Upshi =

- Village
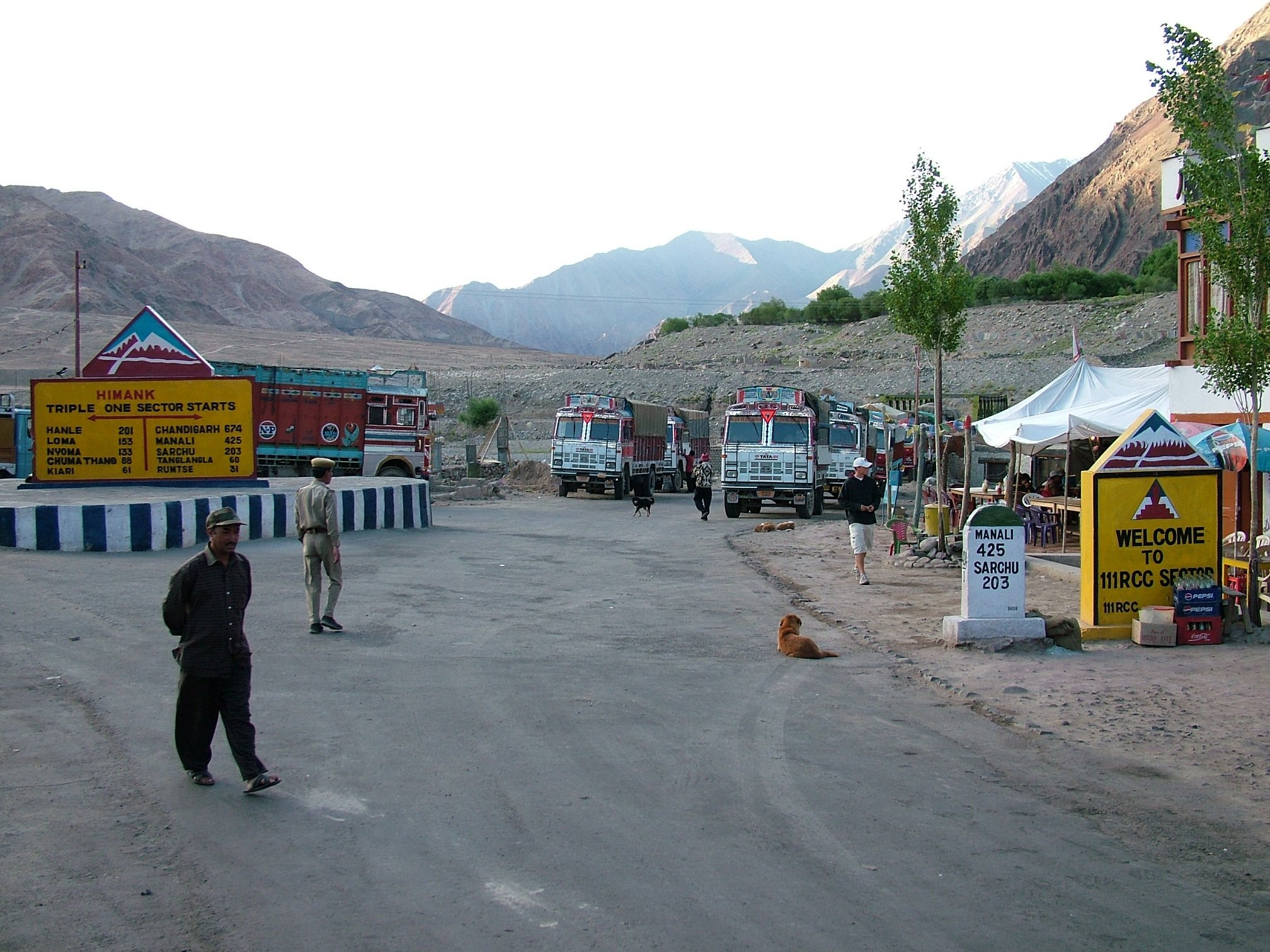
- The village of Upshi and road junction at the northern end of the Leh Manali Highway

- Location in Ladakh, India Upshi (India)
- Coordinates: 33.8°N 77.8°E
- Country: India
- Union Territory: Ladakh
- District: Leh
- Tehsil: Gia

Population (2011)
  - Total: 128

Languages
  - Official: Hindi, English
- Time zone: UTC+5:30 (IST)
- Census code: 890

Upshi is a village and road junction on the Leh-Manali Highway in the union territory of Ladakh in India. It is located 47 km (29 mi) to the southeast of Leh along the Indus river valley and Tanglang La on the Leh-Manali highway. Gya is also to the south.

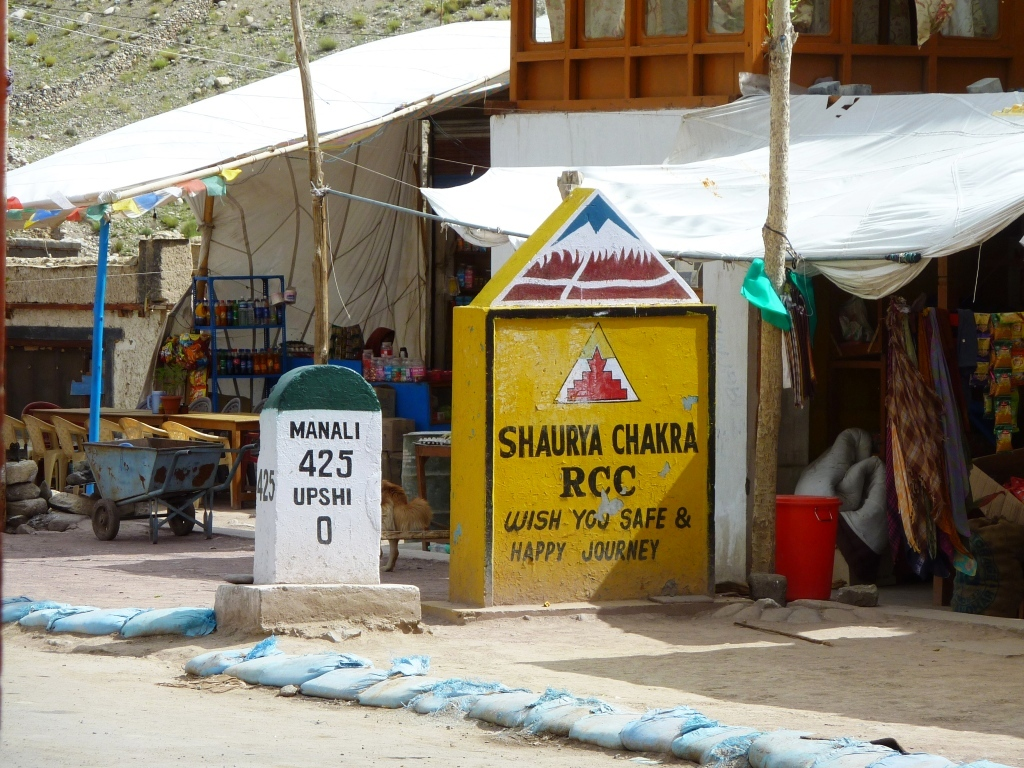
Wish you Safe & Happy Journey. Upshi, Ladakh. 2010

An ancient trading road (right turn while coming from Manali) heads to the east from Upshi towards Tibet. There is a helipad on this road. There is a Customs and Excise department's check post on Leh-Manali highway towards Manali after crossing the river. Goat farming is important to the local economy.

== Demographics ==
According to the 2011 census of India, Upshi has 26 households. The effective literacy rate (i.e. the literacy rate of population excluding children aged 6 and below) is 72.65%.

Demographics (2011 Census)
	Total	Male	Female
Population	128	64	64
Children aged below 6 years	11	8	3
Scheduled caste	0	0	0
Scheduled tribe	128	64	64
Literates	85	46	39
Workers (all)	70	35	35
Main workers (total)	70	35	35
Main workers: Cultivators	53	20	33
Main workers: Agricultural labourers	0	0	0
Main workers: Household industry workers	0	0	0
Main workers: Other	17	15	2
Marginal workers (total)	0	0	0
Marginal workers: Cultivators	0	0	0
Marginal workers: Agricultural labourers	0	0	0
Marginal workers: Household industry workers	0	0	0
Marginal workers: Others	0	0	0
Non-workers	58	29	29

== Transport ==
Upshi, with a loop line for military logistics, will be a civilian passenger station on the under-construction Bhanupli–Leh line. Upshi lies on the NH-3. Nearest airport, Kushok Bakula Rimpochee Airport, is at Leh.

== See also ==
- Kharoo
- Geography of Ladakh
- Tourism in Ladakh
