= Shara, Ladakh =

Shara
- Village
- Location in Ladakh, India Shara (India)
- Coordinates: 33.7766608°N 78.0715562°E
- Country: India
- Union Territory: Ladakh
- District: Leh
- Tehsil: Kharu
- Elevation: 5,117 m (16,788 ft)

Population (2011)
  - Total: 290

Languages
  - Official: Hindi, English
- Time zone: UTC+5:30 (IST)
- 2011 census code: 878

Shara is a village in the Leh district of Ladakh, located in the Indian administered part of the disputed Jammu & Kashmir region. It is located in the Kharu tehsil.

== Demographics ==
According to the 2011 census of India, Shara has 57 households. The effective literacy rate (i.e. the literacy rate of population excluding children aged 6 and below) is 75.38%.

Demographics (2011 Census)
	Total	Male	Female
Population	290	134	156
Children aged below 6 years	26	14	12
Scheduled caste	0	0	0
Scheduled tribe	290	134	156
Literates	199	108	91
Workers (all)	152	72	80
Main workers (total)	46	31	15
Main workers: Cultivators	3	2	1
Main workers: Agricultural labourers	0	0	0
Main workers: Household industry workers	0	0	0
Main workers: Other	43	29	14
Marginal workers (total)	106	41	65
Marginal workers: Cultivators	89	33	56
Marginal workers: Agricultural labourers	0	0	0
Marginal workers: Household industry workers	2	2	0
Marginal workers: Others	15	6	9
Non-workers	138	62	76
