= Choglamsar =

Choglamsar Chuglamsar
- Census town
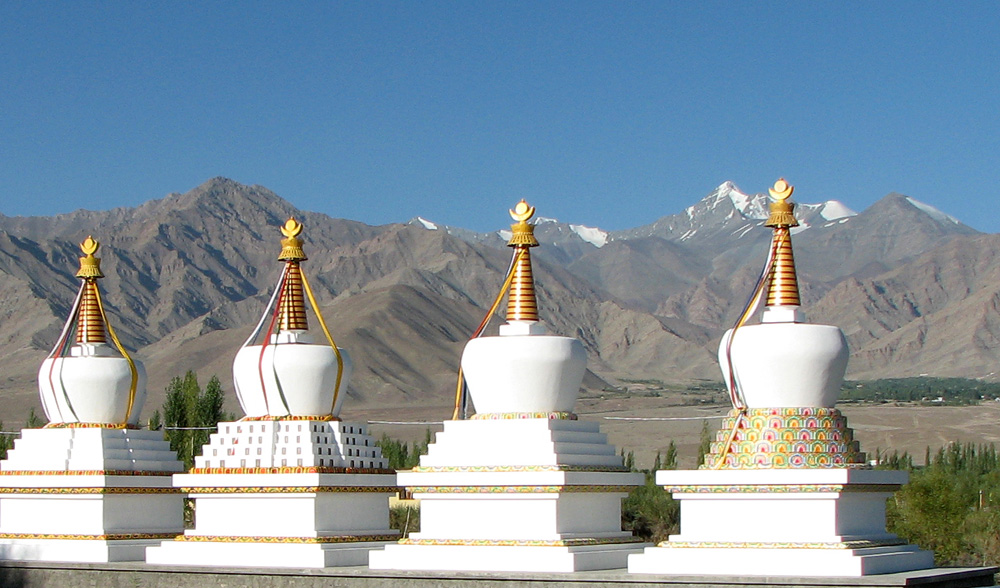
- Stupas at Choglamsar

- Location in Ladakh, India Choglamsar (India)
- Coordinates: 34.1185°N 77.5889°E
- Country: India
- Union territory: Ladakh
- District: Leh
- Tehsil: Leh

Population (2011)
  - Total: 10,754

Languages
  - Official: Hindi, English
- Time zone: UTC+5:30 (IST)
- PIN: 194101
- Vehicle registration: LA-

Choglamsar, also spelled Chuglamsar, is a census town in Leh tehsil in the Leh district of Ladakh, India. It is located on the bank of the Indus River.

== Etymology ==
Two circular passes go to Leh via Choglamsar: one through Spituk, and other through Saboo.

- According to one theory, the name Choglamsar is derived from the Ladakhi words lcog-yog ལྕོག་ཡོག་("winded") maybe ཀྱག་ཀྱོག་ "winding", lam ལམ་ ("pass"), and sar སར་ ("place").
- Another theory derives the name from the words kyok ཀྱོག་ phoneticized as "tchog" ("turn, crooked, bent, winding, curved, zigzag"), lam ལམ་ ("path"), and sar སར་ ("place"). So the name means "the place where path turns" (to Leh town). Indeed, at this point, the road (Leh-Manali Highway) leaves the valley of the indus which it followed, to head north towards the city of Leh
- A third theory derives it from the words chok ("tent") and tsal ཚལ་ ("garden").
- The town is also called "Choklsel" after Tibetan chokse ཅོག་རྩེ་, a type of Ladakhi table.

== Demographics ==
Choglamsar was designated as a census town for the first time during the 2011 Census of India, which recorded its population as 10,754 and literacy rate as 98.55%. The sex ratio of the town was 648 (females per 1000 males); the sex ratio for the population aged 0–6 years was 953.

== Infrastructure ==
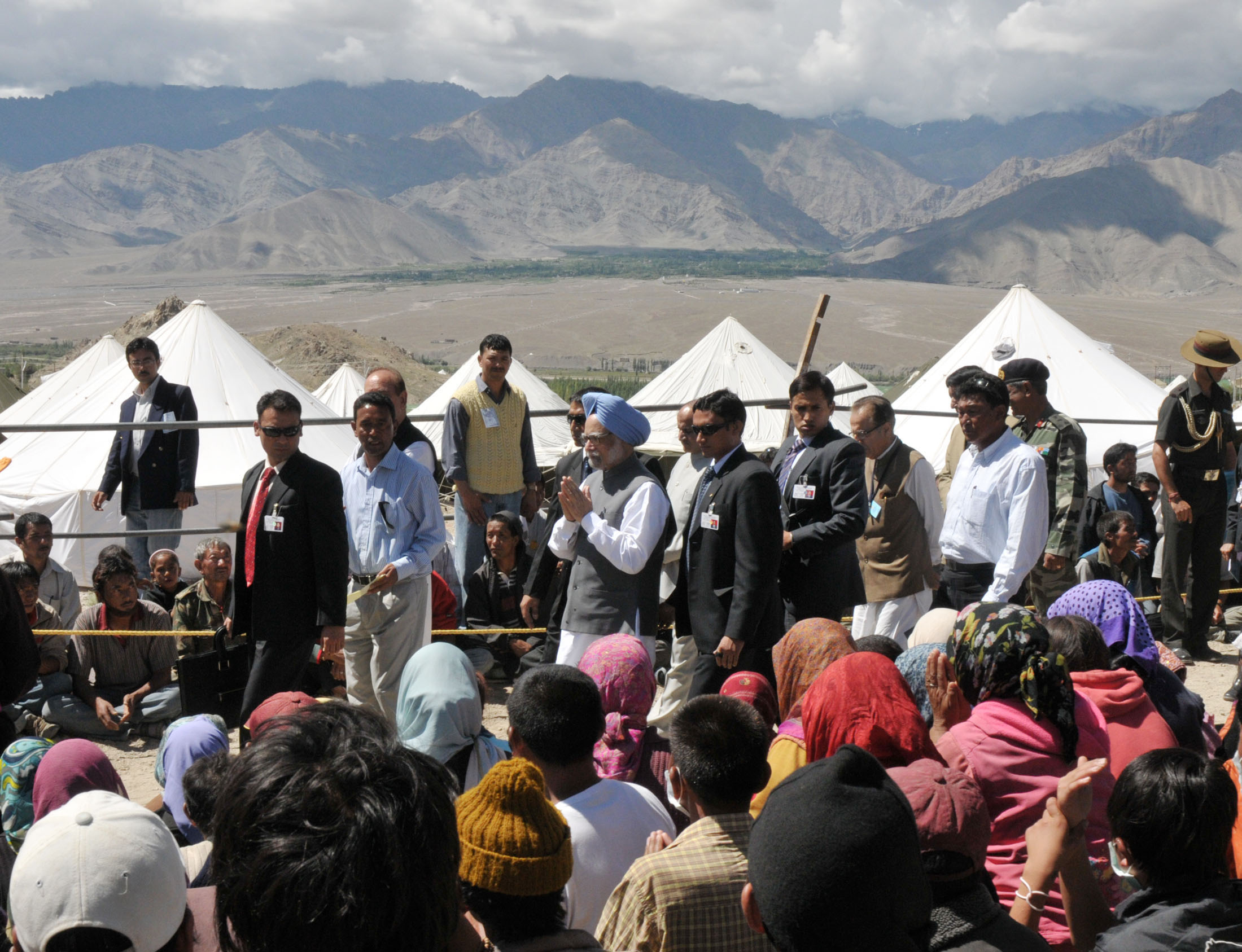
Indian Prime Minister Manmohan Singh visited a flood relief camp at Choglamsar in 2010.

Choglamsar is connected to Leh by road. The town has golf links, a polo ground, horticultural nurseries, and an arts and crafts centre. It has Tibetan refugee camps constructed by the Indian government and the Central Tibetan Administration.

The village was badly affected during the 2010 Ladakh floods.

According to the 2011 census, the town has one primary school, three middle schools, three secondary schools, and one senior secondary school; it does not have any colleges. In 2016, the Central Institute of Buddhist Studies in Choglamsar was given the status of a deemed university by the Government of India, for a period of five years.

The Choglamsar Bridge over the Indus River connects the town to Chuchat Yakma, the site of an Imambara. In 2019, the Indian Army built a suspension bridge in 40 days, connecting Choglamsar to Chuchat Yakma and Stok. Named Maitri Bridge, it is the longest suspension bridge built over the Indus River.
