= Ney, Leh =

Ney
- Village
- Location in Ladakh, India Ney (India)
- Coordinates: 34.2775387°N 77.2994144°E
- Country: India
- Union Territory: Ladakh
- District: Leh
- Tehsil: Basgo
- Elevation: 3,634 m (11,923 ft)

Population (2011)
  - Total: 560
- Time zone: UTC+5:30 (IST)
- 2011 census code: 849

Ney is a village in the Leh district of Ladakh, India. It is located in the Basgo tehsil.

== Demographics ==
According to the 2011 census of India, Ney has 103 households. The effective literacy rate (i.e. the literacy rate of population excluding children aged 6 and below) is 65.82%.

Demographics (2011 Census)
	Total	Male	Female
Population	560	275	285
Children aged below 6 years	51	28	23
Scheduled caste	0	0	0
Scheduled tribe	560	275	285
Literates	335	174	161
Workers (all)	180	124	56
Main workers (total)	146	117	29
Main workers: Cultivators	80	75	5
Main workers: Agricultural labourers	8	6	2
Main workers: Household industry workers	0	0	0
Main workers: Other	58	36	22
Marginal workers (total)	34	7	27
Marginal workers: Cultivators	17	3	14
Marginal workers: Agricultural labourers	5	3	2
Marginal workers: Household industry workers	0	0	0
Marginal workers: Others	12	1	11
Non-workers	380	151	229
