= Sharnose =

- Village
- Country: India
- Union Territory: Ladakh
- District: Leh
- Tehsil: Kharu

Population (2011)
  - Total: 299
- Time zone: UTC+5:30 (IST)
- 2011 census code: 882

Sharnose is a village in the Leh district of Ladakh, India. It is located in the Kharu tehsil.

== Demographics ==
According to the 2011 census of India, Sharnose has 61 households. The effective literacy rate (i.e. the literacy rate of population excluding children aged 6 and below) is 64.86%.

Demographics (2011 Census)
	Total	Male	Female
Population	299	142	157
Children aged below 6 years	40	18	22
Scheduled caste	0	0	0
Scheduled tribe	298	142	156
Literates	168	104	64
Workers (all)	155	70	85
Main workers (total)	130	55	75
Main workers: Cultivators	99	30	69
Main workers: Agricultural labourers	0	0	0
Main workers: Household industry workers	3	3	0
Main workers: Other	28	22	6
Marginal workers (total)	25	15	10
Marginal workers: Cultivators	3	3	0
Marginal workers: Agricultural labourers	15	6	9
Marginal workers: Household industry workers	0	0	0
Marginal workers: Others	7	6	1
Non-workers	144	72	72
