= Skiumarkha =

- Village
- Location in Ladakh, India Skiumarkha (India)
- Coordinates: 33.8719788°N 77.5601805°E
- Country: India
- Union Territory: Ladakh
- District: Leh
- Tehsil: Leh
- Elevation: 5,512 m (18,084 ft)

Population (2011)
  - Total: 328

Languages
  - Official: Hindi, English
- Time zone: UTC+5:30 (IST)
- 2011 census code: 865

Skiumarkha or Sku Marka is a census village in the Leh district of Ladakh, India. It is located in the Leh tehsil.

Located in the Markha valley, the census village comprises Skiu-Kaya and Markha villages. Skiu-Kaya, in turn, is a grouping of two adjacent villages, Skiu and Kaya.

== Demographics ==
According to the 2011 census of India, Skiumarkha has 43 households. The effective literacy rate (i.e. the literacy rate of population excluding children aged 6 and below) is 60.41%.

Demographics (2011 Census)
	Total	Male	Female
Population	328	162	166
Children aged below 6 years	35	18	17
Scheduled caste	0	0	0
Scheduled tribe	325	159	166
Literates	177	93	84
Workers (all)	189	98	91
Main workers (total)	143	57	86
Main workers: Cultivators	126	47	79
Main workers: Agricultural labourers	0	0	0
Main workers: Household industry workers	0	0	0
Main workers: Other	17	10	7
Marginal workers (total)	46	41	5
Marginal workers: Cultivators	1	0	1
Marginal workers: Agricultural labourers	0	0	0
Marginal workers: Household industry workers	0	0	0
Marginal workers: Others	45	41	4
Non-workers	139	64	75
