= Taroo =

- Village
- Location in Ladakh, India Taroo (India)
- Coordinates: 34.203357°N 77.428223°E
- Country: India
- Union Territory: Ladakh
- District: Leh
- Tehsil: Leh

Population (2011)
  - Total: 442

Languages
  - Official: Hindi, English
- Time zone: UTC+5:30 (IST)
- Census code: 853

Taroo or Taru is a village in the Leh district of Ladakh, India. It is located in the Leh tehsil.

== Demographics ==
According to the 2011 census of India, Taroo has 71 households. The effective literacy rate (i.e. the literacy rate of population excluding children aged 6 and below) is 70.03%.

Demographics (2011 Census)
	Total	Male	Female
Population	442	203	239
Children aged below 6 years	45	20	25
Scheduled caste	0	0	0
Scheduled tribe	429	195	234
Literates	278	141	137
Workers (all)	267	128	139
Main workers (total)	143	115	28
Main workers: Cultivators	81	75	6
Main workers: Agricultural labourers	1	0	1
Main workers: Household industry workers	3	2	1
Main workers: Other	58	38	20
Marginal workers (total)	124	13	111
Marginal workers: Cultivators	90	3	87
Marginal workers: Agricultural labourers	10	6	4
Marginal workers: Household industry workers	8	0	8
Marginal workers: Others	16	4	12
Non-workers	175	75	100
