= Thiksey =

- Village
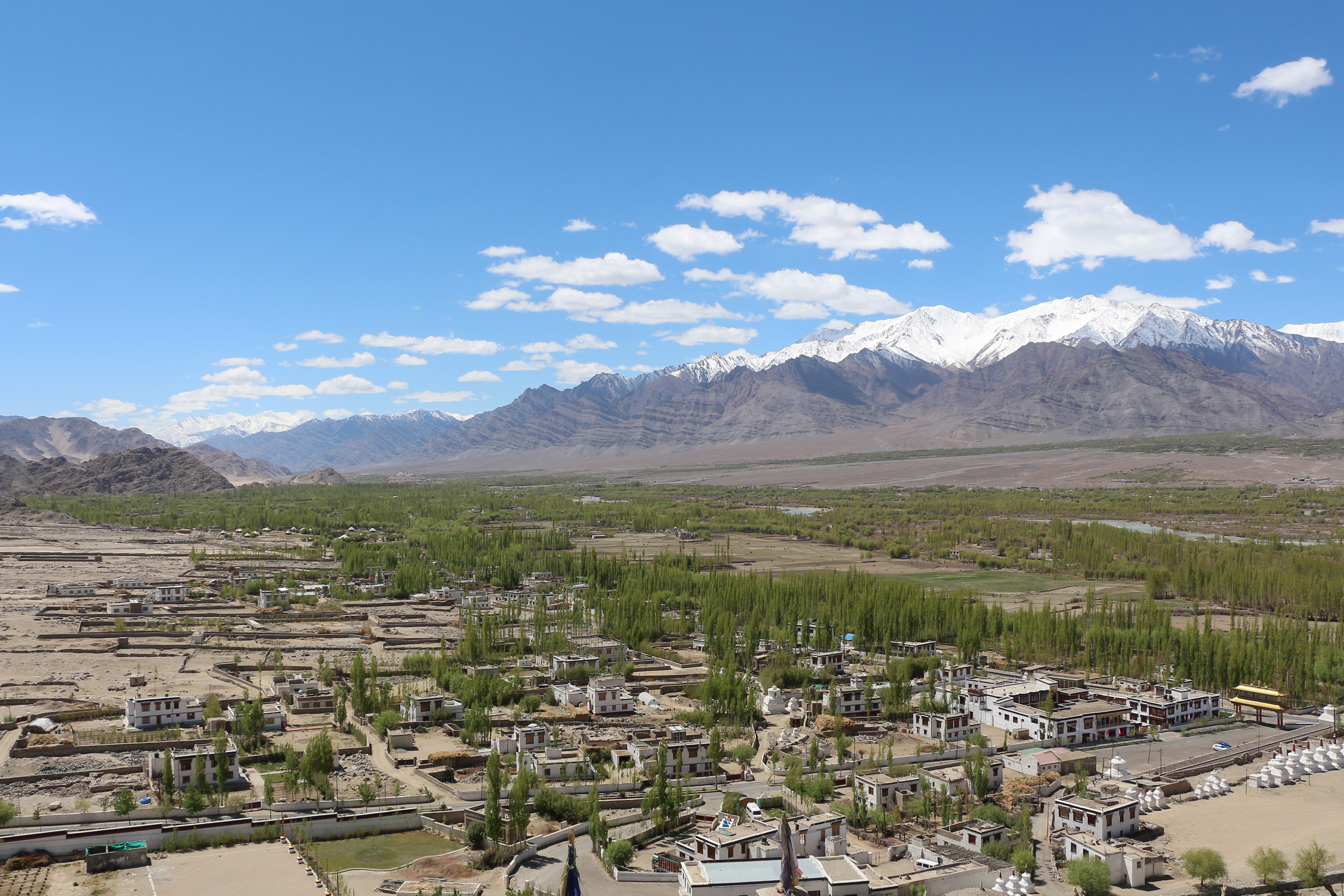
- Thiksey Village

- Location in Ladakh, India Thiksey (India)
- Coordinates: 34.053283°N 77.667365°E
- Country: India
- Union Territory: Ladakh
- District: Leh
- Tehsil: Leh

Population (2011)
  - Total: 2,237
- Time zone: UTC+5:30 (IST)
- Census code: 859

Thiksey is a village and the headquarters of its eponymous block and tehsil in Leh district, Ladakh, India. The Thikse Monastery is located here.

== Demographics ==
According to the 2011 census of India, Thiksey has 433 households. The effective literacy rate (i.e. the literacy rate of population excluding children aged 6 and below) is 75.42%.

Demographics (2011 Census)
	Total	Male	Female
Population	2237	1111	1126
Children aged below 6 years	227	111	116
Scheduled caste	0	0	0
Scheduled tribe	2150	1074	1076
Literates	1516	841	675
Workers (all)	993	573	420
Main workers (total)	912	528	384
Main workers: Cultivators	348	189	159
Main workers: Agricultural labourers	38	10	28
Main workers: Household industry workers	13	9	4
Main workers: Other	513	320	193
Marginal workers (total)	81	45	36
Marginal workers: Cultivators	9	5	4
Marginal workers: Agricultural labourers	3	0	3
Marginal workers: Household industry workers	0	0	0
Marginal workers: Others	69	40	29
Non-workers	1244	538	706
