= Changa, Ladakh =

Changa
- Village
- Location in Ladakh, India Changa (India)
- Coordinates: 33.938695°N 77.721148°E
- Country: India
- Union Territory: Ladakh
- District: Leh
- Tehsil: Kharu

Population (2011)
  - Total: 243
- Time zone: UTC+5:30 (IST)
- Census code: 880

Changa is a village in the Leh district of Ladakh, India. It is located in the Kharu tehsil, on the bank of the Indus River.

== Demographics ==
According to the 2011 census of India, Changa has 58 households. The effective literacy rate (i.e. the literacy rate of population excluding children aged 6 and below) is 66.82%.

Demographics (2011 census)
	Total	Male	Female
Population	243	119	124
Children aged below 6 years	29	16	13
Scheduled caste	0	0	0
Scheduled tribe	242	119	123
Literates	143	84	59
Workers (all)	104	70	34
Main workers (total)	68	52	16
Main workers: Cultivators	3	3	0
Main workers: Agricultural labourers	1	1	0
Main workers: Household industry workers	0	0	0
Main workers: Other	64	48	16
Marginal workers (total)	36	18	18
Marginal workers: Cultivators	8	7	1
Marginal workers: Agricultural labourers	0	0	0
Marginal workers: Household industry workers	0	0	0
Marginal workers: Others	28	11	17
Non-workers	139	49	90

== See also ==
- Kharoo
- Geography of Ladakh
- Tourism in Ladakh
