= Hemis =

Village in Ladakh

Hemis Hamis
- Village
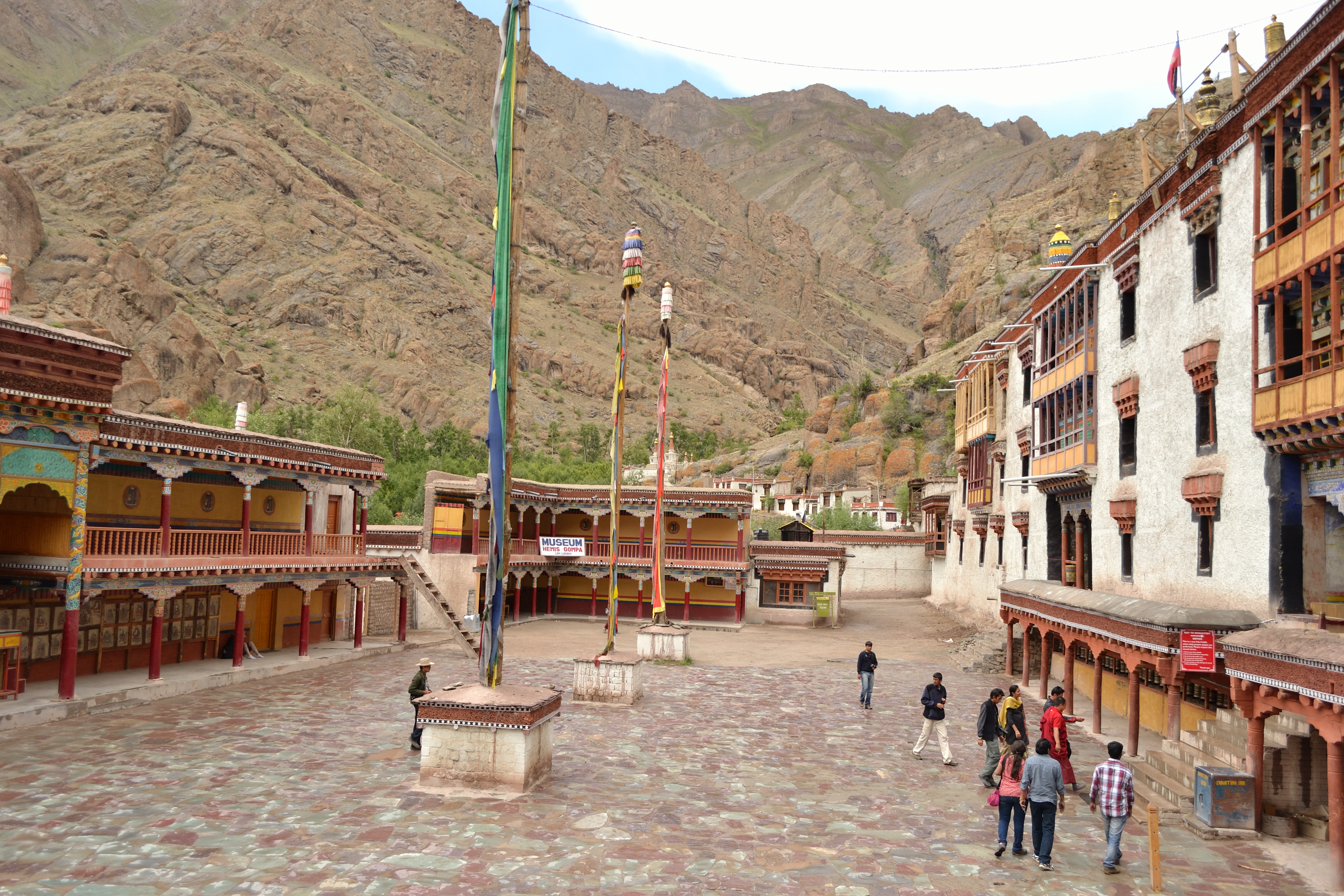

- Location in Ladakh, India Hemis (India)
- Coordinates: 33.912610°N 77.707646°E
- Country: India
- Union Territory: Ladakh
- District: Leh
- Tehsil: Kharu

Population (2011)
  - Total: 313

Languages
  - Official: Ladakhi, English
- Time zone: UTC+5:30 (IST)
- Census code: 892

Hemis, also spelled Hamis, is a village in the Leh district of Ladakh, India. It is located in the Kharu tehsil, 40 km southeast of Leh town on the Leh-Manali Highway and under-construction Bhanupli–Leh line.

Hemis is well known for the Hemis monastery that was established in 1672 AD by king Sengge Namgyal. The village hosts a colorful festival held in July. It is close to the Hemis National Park, an area that is home to the endangered snow leopard. The national park was created in 1981.

== Hemis Monastery ==
Hemis Monastery already existed before the 11th century. Nāropā, the pupil of the yogi Tilopa, and teacher of the translator Marpa was connected with this monastery. A translation of Naropa's biography has been found in Hemis monastery. It has been translated by A. Grünwedel (Năro und Tilo, Festschrift Ernst Kuhn, München 1916). In 1887, Nicolas Notovitch wrote a book claiming to be the translation of a document held in Hemis Library that states Jesus had spent his unknown years at the Hemis monastery.

== Other attractions ==
- Hemis National Park: Inhabited by a number of snow leopards, Hemis National Park is located at an elevation of around 3000 – 6000 m and is spread across more than 4000 km^{2}. Apart from being a home to many rare and endangered species of flora and fauna, this National Park is the second-largest protected area after Nanda Devi Biosphere Reserve. With no motor vehicles allowed in or near the park, you can trek your way up to this place during the months of June to October.
- Gotsang Gompa: A tranquil and quiet place, Gotsang Gompa is located close to the Hemis Monastery. A roadless Buddhist Center, Gotsang Gompa has two main temple buildings and is reachable via a hiking trail from Hemis Gompa.
- Stakna Monastery: Often referred to as Stakna Gompa (literal translation: Tiger's Nose), this monastery is perched atop a hill shaped like a tiger's nose, thus the name. Located along the banks of the Indus River, this monastery is situated at a distance of 25 km from Leh city's centre.

== Demographics ==
According to the 2011 census of India, Hemis has 24 households. The effective literacy rate (i.e. the literacy rate of population excluding children aged 6 and below) is 90.63%.

Demographics (2011 Census)
	Total	Male	Female
Population	313	256	57
Children aged below 6 years	25	18	7
Scheduled caste	0	0	0
Scheduled tribe	85	61	24
Literates	261	230	31
Workers (all)	177	141	36
Main workers (total)	173	140	33
Main workers: Cultivators	48	18	30
Main workers: Agricultural labourers	1	1	0
Main workers: Household industry workers	0	0	0
Main workers: Other	124	121	3
Marginal workers (total)	4	1	3
Marginal workers: Cultivators	0	0	0
Marginal workers: Agricultural labourers	0	0	0
Marginal workers: Household industry workers	0	0	0
Marginal workers: Others	4	1	3
Non-workers	136	115	21
