= Youl Chung =

Youl Chung Yulchung, Yelchang
- Town
- Location in Ladakh, India Youl Chung (India)
- Coordinates: 33.928406°N 76.914618°E
- Country: India
- Union Territory: Ladakh
- District: Leh
- Tehsil: Leh

Population (2011)
  - Total: 261
- Time zone: UTC+5:30 (IST)
- Census code: 961

Youl Chung (also called Yulchung, Yelchang) is a Town in the Leh district of Ladakh, India. It is located in the Leh tehsil.

== Demographics ==
According to the 2011 census of India, Youl Chung has 42 households. The effective literacy rate (i.e. the literacy rate of population excluding children aged 6 and below) is 73.8%.

Demographics (2011 Census)
	Total	Male	Female
Population	261	136	125
Children aged below 6 years	32	14	18
Scheduled caste	0	0	0
Scheduled tribe	261	136	125
Literates	169	108	61
Workers (all)	135	71	64
Main workers (total)	79	59	20
Main workers: Cultivators	41	34	7
Main workers: Agricultural labourers	0	0	0
Main workers: Household industry workers	0	0	0
Main workers: Other	38	25	13
Marginal workers (total)	56	12	44
Marginal workers: Cultivators	38	2	36
Marginal workers: Agricultural labourers	0	0	0
Marginal workers: Household industry workers	0	0	0
Marginal workers: Others	18	10	8
Non-workers	126	65	61
