= Mathoo =

- Village
- Location in Ladakh, India Mathoo (India)
- Coordinates: 33.7729034°N 77.8062513°E
- Country: India
- Union Territory: Ladakh
- District: Leh
- Tehsil: Chushot
- Elevation: 3,869 m (12,694 ft)

Population (2011)
  - Total: 1,165
- Time zone: UTC+5:30 (IST)
- 2011 census code: 868

Mathoo is a village in the Leh district of Ladakh, India. It is located in the Chushot tehsil.

== Demographics ==
According to the 2011 census of India, Mathoo has 279 households. The effective literacy rate (i.e. the literacy rate of population excluding children aged 6 and below) is 67.34%.

Demographics (2011 Census)
	Total	Male	Female
Population	1165	554	611
Children aged below 6 years	130	70	60
Scheduled caste	0	0	0
Scheduled tribe	1160	550	610
Literates	697	360	337
Workers (all)	714	345	369
Main workers (total)	131	75	56
Main workers: Cultivators	6	3	3
Main workers: Agricultural labourers	0	0	0
Main workers: Household industry workers	0	0	0
Main workers: Other	125	72	53
Marginal workers (total)	583	270	313
Marginal workers: Cultivators	480	179	301
Marginal workers: Agricultural labourers	4	1	3
Marginal workers: Household industry workers	0	0	0
Marginal workers: Others	99	90	9
Non-workers	451	209	242
