= Shang, Ladakh =

Shang
- Village
- Location in Ladakh, India Shang (India)
- Coordinates: 33.5669975°N 78.0497434°E
- Country: India
- Union Territory: Ladakh
- District: Leh
- Tehsil: Kharu
- Elevation: 4,395 m (14,419 ft)

Population (2011)
  - Total: 230

Languages
  - Official: Hindi, English
- Time zone: UTC+5:30 (IST)
- PIN: 194201
- 2011 census code: 891

Shang is a village in the Leh district of Ladakh, India. It is located in the Kharu tehsil.

== Demographics ==
According to the 2011 census of India, Shang has 51 households. The effective literacy rate (i.e. the literacy rate of population excluding children aged 6 and below) is 59.51%.

Demographics (2011 Census)
	Total	Male	Female
Population	230	115	115
Children aged below 6 years	25	17	8
Scheduled caste	0	0	0
Scheduled tribe	229	115	114
Literates	122	66	56
Workers (all)	180	89	91
Main workers (total)	127	60	67
Main workers: Cultivators	123	57	66
Main workers: Agricultural labourers	0	0	0
Main workers: Household industry workers	0	0	0
Main workers: Other	4	3	1
Marginal workers (total)	53	29	24
Marginal workers: Cultivators	1	0	1
Marginal workers: Agricultural labourers	0	0	0
Marginal workers: Household industry workers	0	0	0
Marginal workers: Others	52	29	23
Non-workers	50	26	24
