= Shang (disambiguation) =

The Shang dynasty was a Chinese royal dynasty.

Shang may also refer to:

- Predynastic Shang, or "Proto-Shang"
- Yinxu, or the "Great City Shang"
- Shanghai, sometimes abbreviated to Shang in compound names
- Shangzhou District, Shaanxi, China, formerly Shang County
- Shang, Leh, village in Jammu and Kashmir, India
- Shang (bell), a Tibetan bell
- Shang (surname), Chinese surname
- Shang (sculpture), a public art work by Mark di Suvero
