= Rambir Por =

- Village
- Location in Ladakh, India Rambir Por (India)
- Coordinates: 33.995159°N 77.825068°E
- Country: India
- Union Territory: Ladakh
- District: Leh
- Tehsil: Leh

Population (2011)
  - Total: 594
- Time zone: UTC+5:30 (IST)
- Census code: 860

Rambir Por or Rambirpur is a village in Leh district of Ladakh in India. It is located in the Leh tehsil.

== Demographics ==
According to the 2011 census of India, Rambir Por has 122 households. The effective literacy rate (i.e. the literacy rate of population excluding children aged 6 and below) is 80.78%.

Demographics (2011 Census)
	Total	Male	Female
Population	594	307	287
Children aged below 6 years	58	36	22
Scheduled caste	0	0	0
Scheduled tribe	586	301	285
Literates	433	230	203
Workers (all)	233	156	77
Main workers (total)	204	132	72
Main workers: Cultivators	86	38	48
Main workers: Agricultural labourers	6	4	2
Main workers: Household industry workers	7	7	0
Main workers: Other	105	83	22
Marginal workers (total)	29	24	5
Marginal workers: Cultivators	3	3	0
Marginal workers: Agricultural labourers	5	4	1
Marginal workers: Household industry workers	1	1	0
Marginal workers: Others	20	16	4
Non-workers	361	151	210
