= Umla =

- Village
- Location in JLadakh, India Umla (India)
- Coordinates: 34.237306°N 77.399722°E
- Country: India
- Union Territory: Ladakh
- District: Leh
- Tehsil: Leh

Population (2011)
  - Total: 99
- Time zone: UTC+5:30 (IST)
- Census code: 850

Umla is a village in the Leh district of Ladakh, India. It is located in the Leh tehsil.

== Demographics ==
According to the 2011 census of India, Umla has 21 households. The effective literacy rate (i.e. the literacy rate of population excluding children aged 6 and below) is 64.84%.

Demographics (2011 Census)
	Total	Male	Female
Population	99	53	46
Children aged below 6 years	8	5	3
Scheduled caste	0	0	0
Scheduled tribe	97	51	46
Literates	59	36	23
Workers (all)	54	26	28
Main workers (total)	51	24	27
Main workers: Cultivators	40	17	23
Main workers: Agricultural labourers	1	1	0
Main workers: Household industry workers	0	0	0
Main workers: Other	10	6	4
Marginal workers (total)	3	2	1
Marginal workers: Cultivators	1	1	0
Marginal workers: Agricultural labourers	0	0	0
Marginal workers: Household industry workers	0	0	0
Marginal workers: Others	2	1	1
Non-workers	45	27	18
