= Central Institute of Buddhist Studies =

Deemed university in Ladakh, India

- Logo of the Central Institute of Buddhist Studies
- Former name: School of Buddhist Philosophy
- Type: Deemed university
- Established: 1959; 67 years ago
- Affiliations: UGC
- Vice-Chancellor: Rajesh Ranjan
- Director: Geshe Konchok Wangdu
- Head: Dr. Rahul Mishra, Department of Hindi
- Students: 2094
- Location: Leh, Ladakh, India
- Website: cibs.ac.in

The Central Institute of Buddhist Studies, formerly known as the School of Buddhist Philosophy, located in Leh town of Ladakh is a deemed university under Ministry of Culture. It was founded in 1959 and formerly affiliated to the Sampurnanand Sanskrit University in Varanasi.

== Courses ==
Apart from Buddhist philosophy, Sanskrit, English, Hindi, Tibetan and Pali languages are also taught. and Also other courses like Traditional Medicine /BSRMS courses, Traditional Painting, Traditional Sculptures, Wood Carving and Traditional Astronomy class were also taught.

== History ==
Prior to 1959, Ladakhi scholars, novices and monks used to go to Tibet in pursuit of higher monastic Buddhist education, and to do research for years in the famous Mahaviharas of Drepung, Sera, Tashi Lhunpo, Gaden, Sakya, Sangag Chosling, Dege, Drigung and other monastic centres. In the 1950s, this practice came to an abrupt end because of the political situation in Tibet. Hence, it was held imperative that a Buddhist institute should be established for formal Buddhist education in Ladakh. According to archival sources, when the Government of India was organizing the celebration of the 2500th birth anniversary of Gautama Buddha in 1955, Bakula Rinpoche led an official delegation to Tibet, and on his return had a three-hour meeting with the Indian Prime Minister, Pandit Jawaharlal Nehru. At this meeting, Bakula Rinpoche gave a detailed account of the situation in Tibet, including the fact that Ladakhis could no longer travel there to pursue their religious education. He underlined the need for ensuring similar opportunities in Ladakh.

Accordingly, the Central Institute of Buddhist Studies was established with the holy rituals performed by Skyabje Ling Rinpoche, the senior tutor of the 14th Dalai Lama. The institute was initially called the "School of Buddhist Philosophy". Leh was chosen as the centre for the dissemination of Buddhist culture and philosophy in view of its geographical suitability and traditional matrix. In 1962, at Kushok Bakula Rinpoche's urging, Prime Minister Nehru was fully persuaded of the necessity for such an institution for the Buddhists living in the Himalayas. Thus the institution was given full accreditation with regard to financial support and came under the administrative charge of the Ministry of Culture, Govt. of India.

In its initial stages, the institute admitted ten monks, one each from ten monasteries in Ladakh. Two teachers were appointed to instruct the students in Tibetan literature and Buddhist philosophy. The first principal of the institute (1959 – 1967) was a renowned Tibetan Buddhist scholar, Ven. Yeshi Thupstan. For three years these ten monasteries bore the entire expenses of the students and the teachers. From 1959 to 1961 the institute was in Leh. From there it was moved to Spituk village, about 8 km away from Leh, in 1962. The School of Buddhist Philosophy was registered as an educational institution in the year 1964, under the J&K Societies Registration Act of 1941. In 1973 new buildings for the institute were constructed in Choglamsar, 8 km south-east of Leh. Sanskrit, Hindi, English and Pali languages were introduced, in addition to the teaching of Buddhist philosophy and Tibetan literature. In the same year the institute was affiliated to Sampurnanand Sanskrit University, Varanasi (U.P.), and courses suitable for students of the frontier region were introduced.

== Deemed university status ==
In 2016, the Central Government, on the advice of the University Grants Committee (UGC), declared that the Central Institute of Buddhist Studies (CIBS), Choglamsar, Leh (Ladakh) was 'deemed to be university' for the purpose of the UGC Act, 1956, but provisionally for a period of five years under the de novo category, from the date the CIBS disaffiliated its courses / programmes from Sampurnanand Sanskrit University, Varanasi and the Tibetan Medicine and Astrology Department, Dharamsala.

== See also ==
- Central Institute of Higher Tibetan Studies, in Varanasi in Uttar Pradesh in India
- Gautam Buddha University, in Noida in Uttar Pradesh in India
- Lumbini Buddhist University, in Lumbini in Nepal
- Sanchi University of Buddhist-Indic Studies, in Sanchi in Madhya Pradesh in India
- List of Buddhist universities across the world
