= Chuchot Shama =

- Village
- Location in Ladakh, India Chuchot Shama (India)
- Coordinates: 33.894519°N 77.647434°E
- Country: India
- Union Territory: Ladakh
- District: Leh
- Tehsil: Chushot

Population (2011)
  - Total: 1,567
- Time zone: UTC+5:30 (IST)
- Census code: 866

Chuchot Shama is a village in the Leh district of Ladakh, India. It is located in the Chushot tehsil. The village is located on the banks of river Indus.

== Demographics ==
According to the 2011 census of India, Chuchot Shama has 296 households. The effective literacy rate (i.e. the literacy rate of population excluding children aged 6 and below) is 81.43%.

Demographics (2011 Census)
	Total	Male	Female
Population	1567	768	799
Children aged below 6 years	167	90	77
Scheduled caste	0	0	0
Scheduled tribe	1558	762	796
Literates	1140	611	529
Workers (all)	420	325	95
Main workers (total)	402	314	88
Main workers: Cultivators	22	20	2
Main workers: Agricultural labourers	0	0	0
Main workers: Household industry workers	2	1	1
Main workers: Other	378	293	85
Marginal workers (total)	18	11	7
Marginal workers: Cultivators	6	3	3
Marginal workers: Agricultural labourers	0	0	0
Marginal workers: Household industry workers	0	0	0
Marginal workers: Others	12	8	4
Non-workers	1147	443	704
