= Nang, Leh =

Nang
- Village
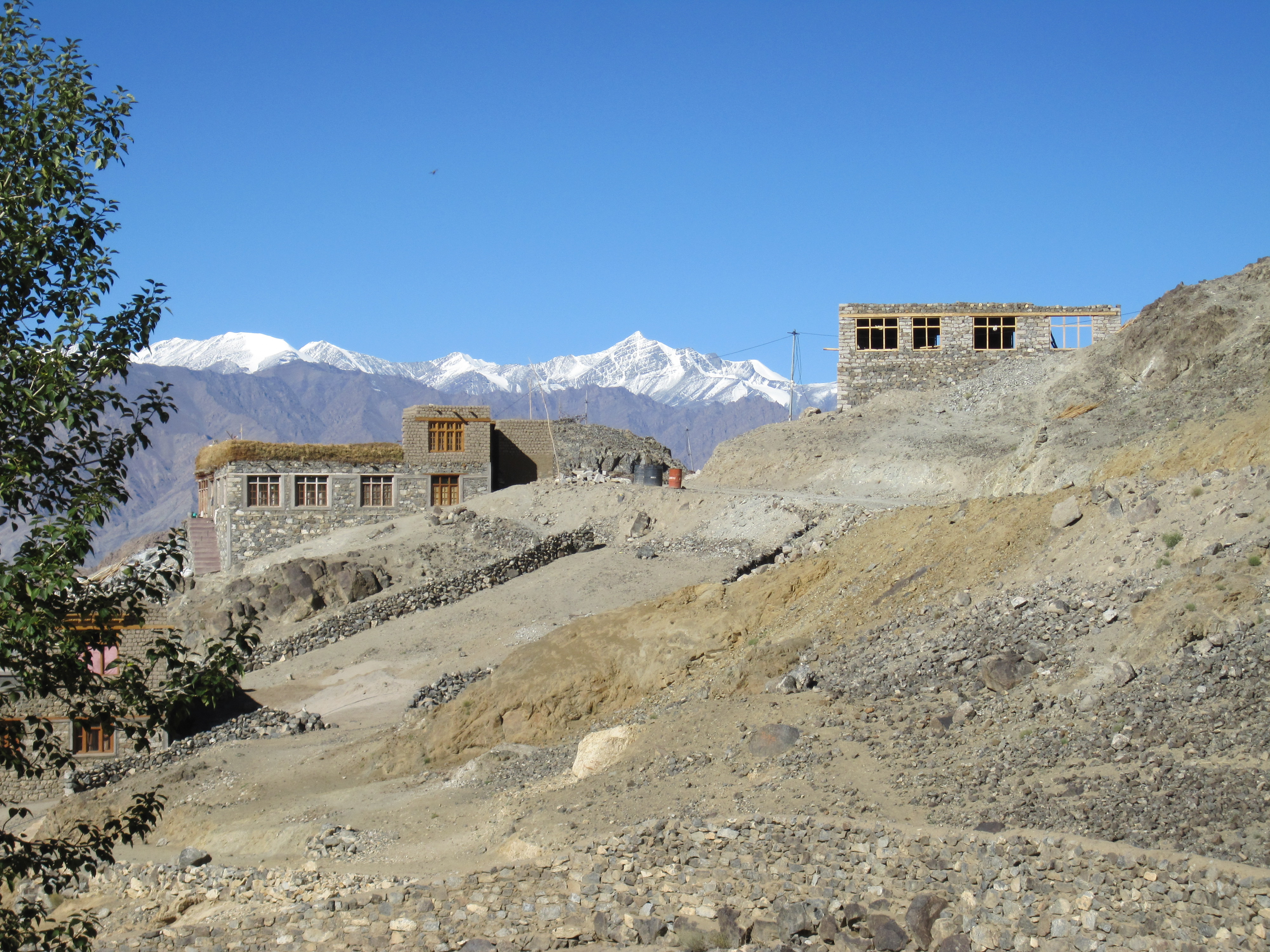

- Location in Ladakh, India Nang (India)
- Coordinates: 34.043138°N 77.7351935°E
- Country: India
- Union Territory: Ladakh
- District: Leh
- Tehsil: Leh
- Elevation: 3,583 m (11,755 ft)

Population (2011)
  - Total: 334
- Time zone: UTC+5:30 (IST)
- 2011 census code: 857

Nang is a village in the Leh district of Ladakh, India. It is located in the Leh tehsil.

== Demographics ==
According to the 2011 census of India, Nang has 74 households. The effective literacy rate (i.e. the literacy rate of population excluding children aged 6 and below) is 60.34%.

Demographics (2011 Census)
	Total	Male	Female
Population	334	156	178
Children aged below 6 years	44	24	20
Scheduled caste	0	0	0
Scheduled tribe	333	156	177
Literates	175	94	81
Workers (all)	95	68	27
Main workers (total)	37	24	13
Main workers: Cultivators	3	2	1
Main workers: Agricultural labourers	0	0	0
Main workers: Household industry workers	0	0	0
Main workers: Other	34	22	12
Marginal workers (total)	58	44	14
Marginal workers: Cultivators	50	39	11
Marginal workers: Agricultural labourers	0	0	0
Marginal workers: Household industry workers	0	0	0
Marginal workers: Others	8	5	3
Non-workers	239	88	151
