= Saboo, Leh =

Saboo
- Village
- Location in Ladakh, India Saboo (India)
- Coordinates: 34.1328805°N 77.6335659°E
- Country: India
- Union Territory: Ladakh
- District: Leh
- Tehsil: Leh
- Elevation: 3,544 m (11,627 ft)

Population (2011)
  - Total: 1,233

Languages
  - Official: Hindi, English
- Time zone: UTC+5:30 (IST)
- 2011 census code: 856

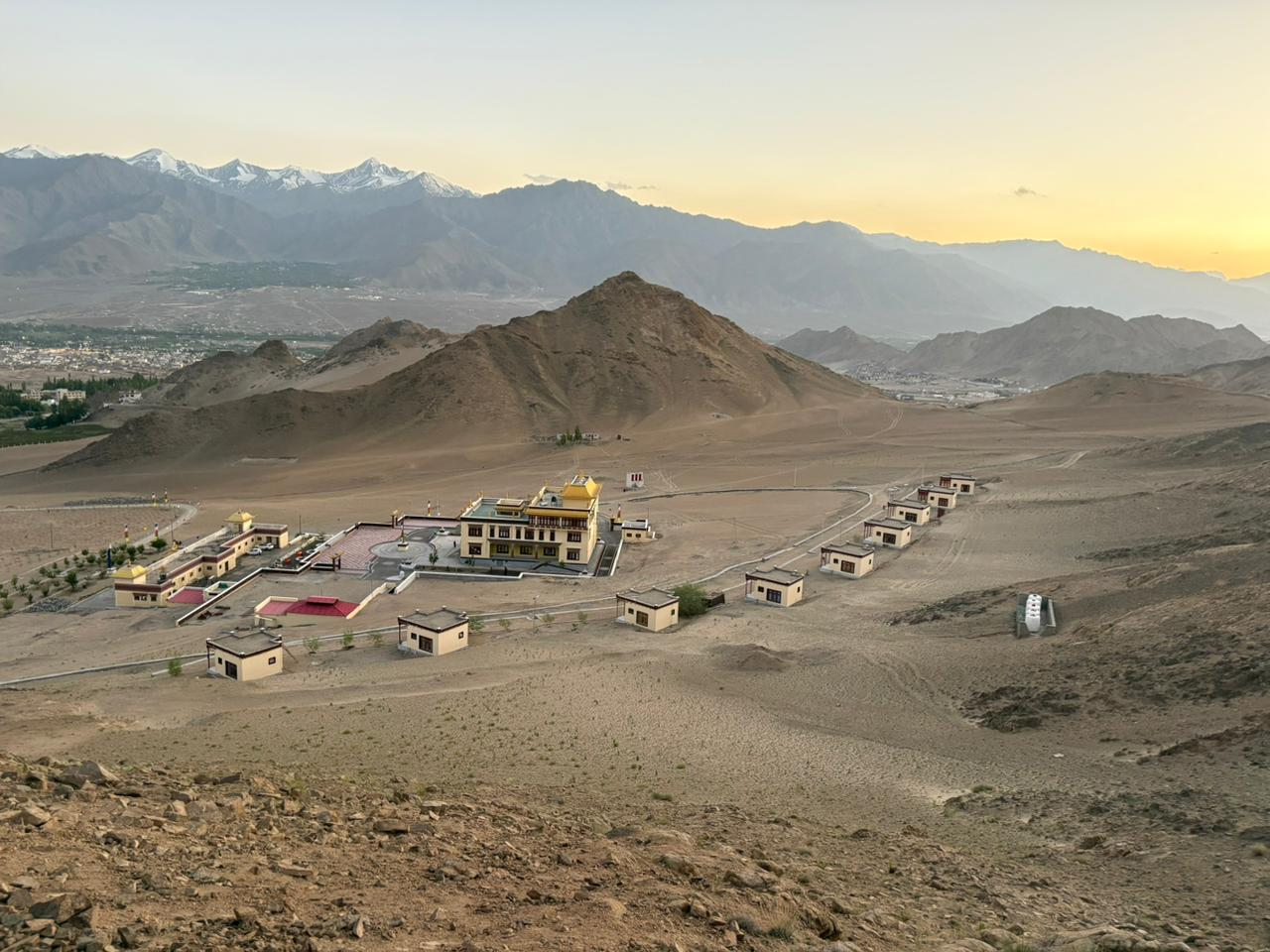
Ngari Institute of Budhhist Dialectics, saboo

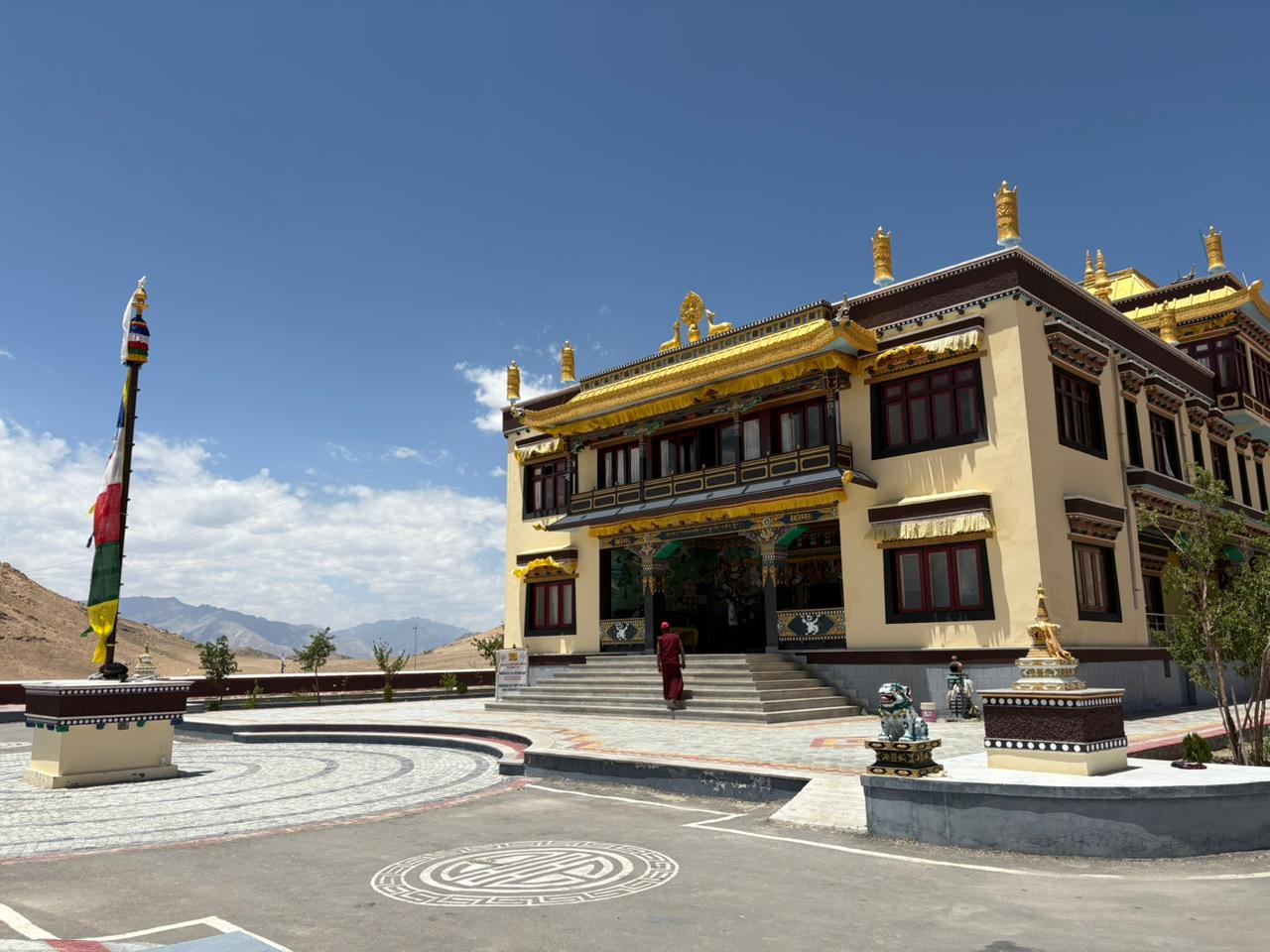
Ngari institute of buddhist dialectics saboo leh ladakh

Saboo is a village in the Leh district of Ladakh, India. It is located in the Leh tehsil.

== History ==
The name 'Saboo' is derived from 'sa' (soil) and 'phud' (top quality).

Saboo is believed to be founded by the Menag people from Eastern Tibet. In the 14th century, Lhachen Shesrab made Saboo the capital of Ladakh.

== Demographics ==
According to the 2011 census of India, Saboo has 259 households. The effective literacy rate (i.e. the literacy rate of population excluding children aged 6 and below) is 83.73%.

Demographics (2011 Census)
	Total	Male	Female
Population	1233	609	624
Children aged below 6 years	127	76	51
Scheduled caste	0	0	0
Scheduled tribe	1228	604	624
Literates	926	497	429
Workers (all)	690	338	352
Main workers (total)	574	297	277
Main workers: Cultivators	217	90	127
Main workers: Agricultural labourers	23	6	17
Main workers: Household industry workers	2	1	1
Main workers: Other	332	200	132
Marginal workers (total)	116	41	75
Marginal workers: Cultivators	19	6	13
Marginal workers: Agricultural labourers	53	6	47
Marginal workers: Household industry workers	5	1	4
Marginal workers: Others	39	28	11
Non-workers	543	271	272
