= Chuchat Yakma =

Chuchat Yakma Chuchot Yokma
- Village
- Location in Ladakh, India Chuchat Yakma (India)
- Coordinates: 33.988628°N 77.287842°E
- Country: India
- Union Territory: Ladakh
- District: Leh
- Tehsil: Chushot

Population (2011)
  - Total: 2,162
- Time zone: UTC+5:30 (IST)
- Census code: 863

Chuchat Yakma, also known as Chuchot Yokma, is a village in the Leh district of Ladakh, India. It is located in the Chushot tehsil.

== Demographics ==
According to the 2011 census of India, Chuchot Yokma has 428 households. The effective literacy rate (i.e. the literacy rate of population excluding children aged 6 and below) is 83.34%.

Demographics (2011 Census)
	Total	Male	Female
Population	2162	1054	1108
Children aged below 6 years	259	124	135
Scheduled caste	0	0	0
Scheduled tribe	2066	1005	1061
Literates	1586	868	718
Workers (all)	944	526	418
Main workers (total)	656	409	247
Main workers: Cultivators	209	58	151
Main workers: Agricultural labourers	5	1	4
Main workers: Household industry workers	13	6	7
Main workers: Other	429	344	85
Marginal workers (total)	288	117	171
Marginal workers: Cultivators	142	43	99
Marginal workers: Agricultural labourers	12	7	5
Marginal workers: Household industry workers	44	1	43
Marginal workers: Others	90	66	24
Non-workers	1218	528	690
