= Basgo =

Village in Ladakh, India

- Village and Tehsil
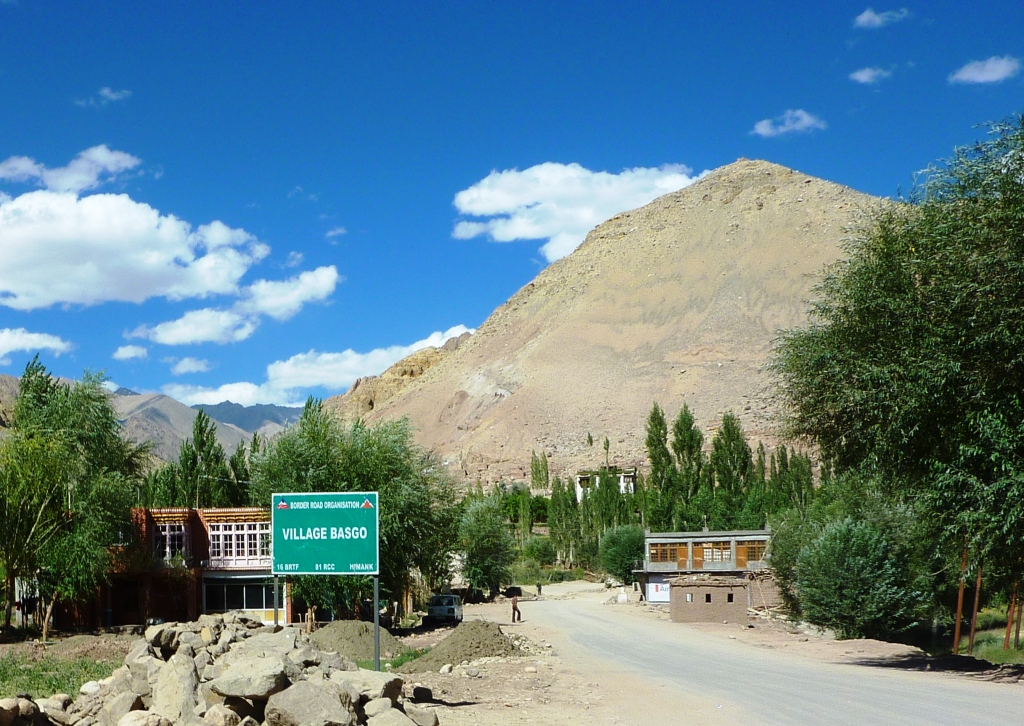
- Basgo village

- Location in Ladakh, India Basgo (India)
- Coordinates: 34.22°N 77.28°E
- Country: India
- Union territory: Ladakh
- District: Leh
- Tehsil: Basgo
- Elevation: 3,292 m (10,801 ft)

Languages
  - Official: Hindi, English
- Time zone: UTC+5:30 (IST)

Basgo or Bazgoo, is a village and one of the tehsil situated on the bank of the Indus River in Leh district, Ladakh, India. It was once an important cultural and political centre and is frequently mentioned in the Ladakhi Chronicles. It is known for its gompas such as Basgo Monastery and historical ruins. As of the 2011 Census of India, Basgo had a population of 950 spread over 172 households.

== Demographics ==
According to the 2011 census of India, Bazgoo has 172 households. The effective literacy rate (i.e. the literacy rate of population excluding children aged 6 and below) is 70.02%.

Demographics (2011 Census)
	Total	Male	Female
Population	950	436	514
Children aged below 6 years	96	53	43
Scheduled caste	0	0	0
Scheduled tribe	925	424	501
Literates	598	283	315
Workers (all)	269	197	72
Main workers (total)	252	186	66
Main workers: Cultivators	114	110	4
Main workers: Agricultural labourers	1	1	0
Main workers: Household industry workers	1	0	1
Main workers: Other	136	75	61
Marginal workers (total)	17	11	6
Marginal workers: Cultivators	1	0	1
Marginal workers: Agricultural labourers	2	1	1
Marginal workers: Household industry workers	1	0	1
Marginal workers: Others	13	10	3
Non-workers	681	239	442

== Gallery ==
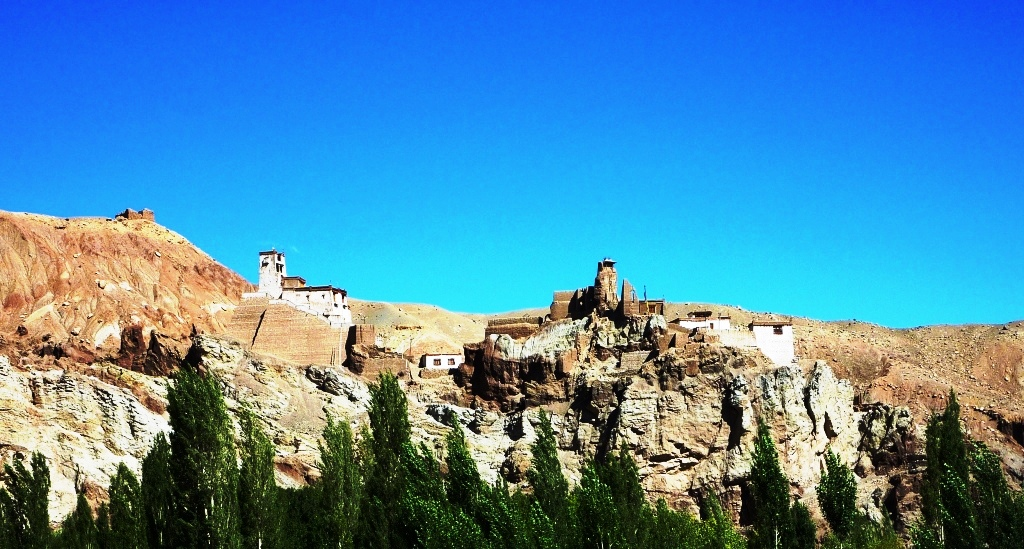
Basgo Gompa

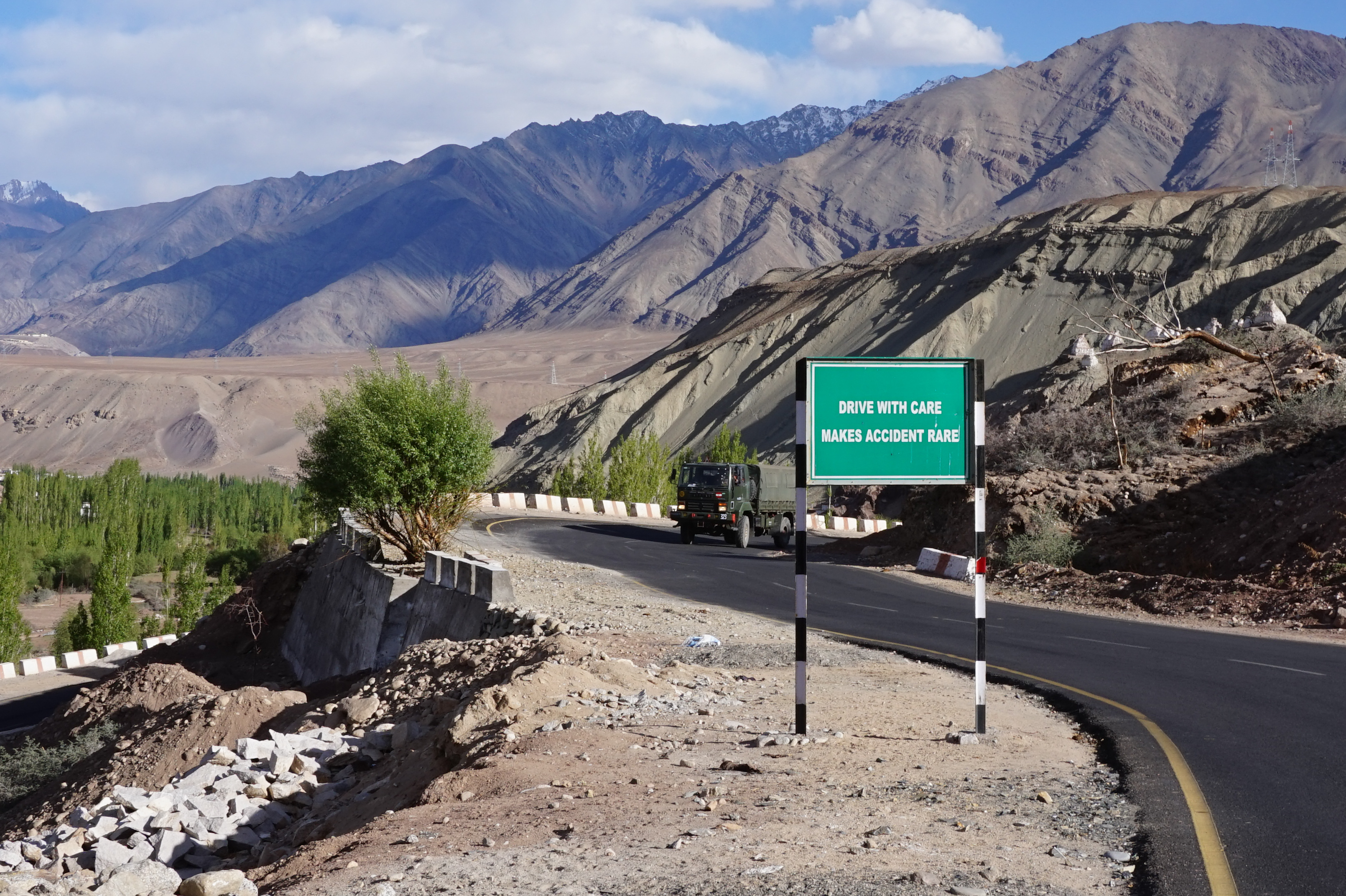
BRO road sign "Drive with care makes accident rare" near Basgo
