= Shangzhou Town =

Town in Sichuan, China

Coordinates: 28.8576°N 104.0657°E

Shangzhou (商州镇) is a town in Yibin County, Sichuan, China. The town had a population of 27,873 at the end of 2019.
