= Leh district =

District of Ladakh, administered by India

- District of Ladakh administered by India
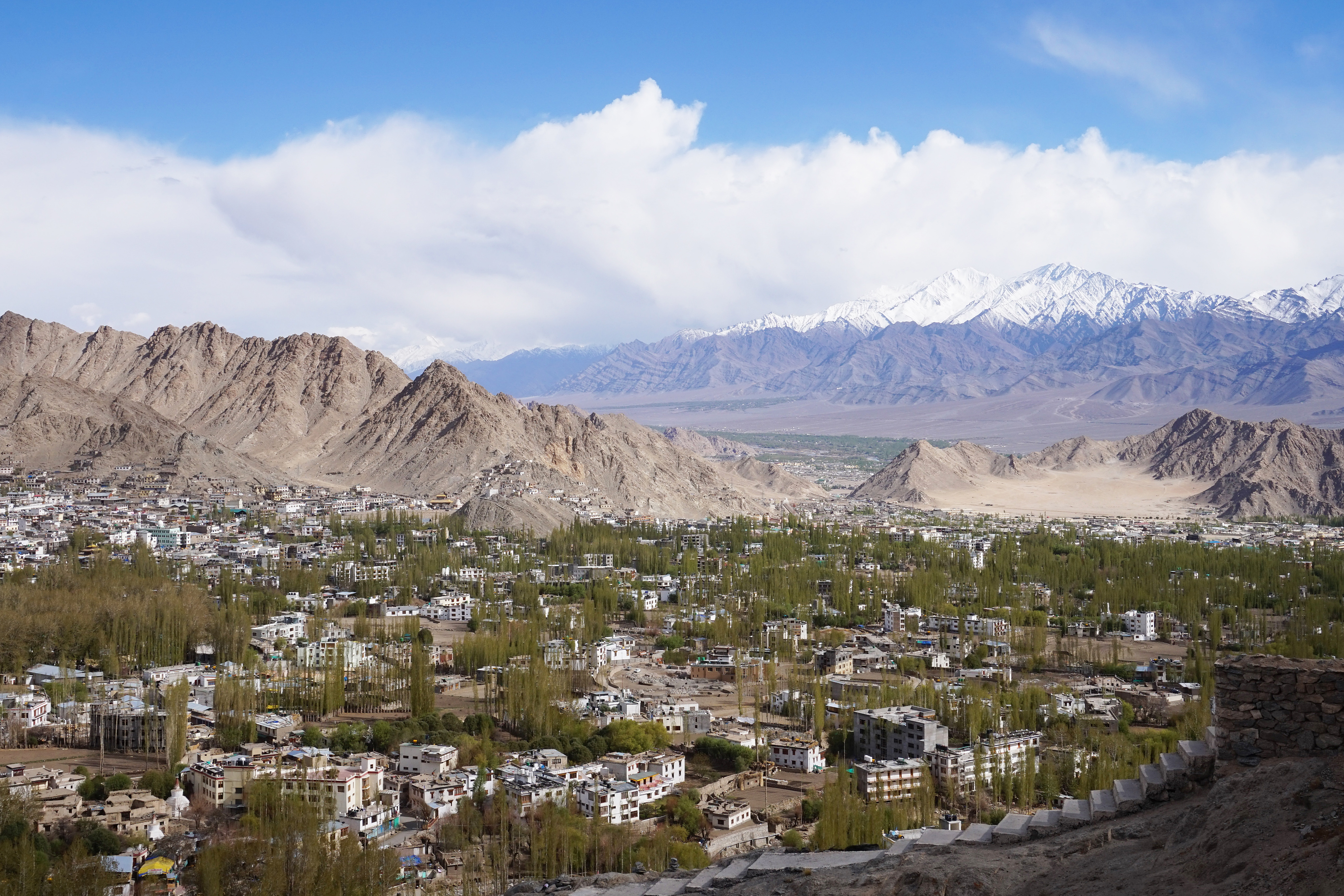
- View of Leh Town
- Interactive map of Leh district
- Coordinates (Leh): 33°38′N 77°46′E
- Administering country: India
- Union Territory: Ladakh
- Headquarters: Leh
- Established: 1 July 1979
- Headquarters: Leh
- Tehsils: Leh, Basgo, Chushot, Gia and Kharu

Government
  - Deputy Commissioner: Sh. Romil Singh Donk IAS
  - Chief Executive Councillor: post vacant since {1st november}
  - Lok Sabha Constituency: Ladakh
  - MP: Mohmad Haneefa

Area
  - Total: 12,000 km^{2} (4,600 sq mi)

Population (2011)
  - Total: 133,487
  - Density: 11/km^{2} (29/sq mi)
  - Urban: 45,671

Demographics
  - Literacy: 77.2%
  - Sex ratio: 690 ♀/ 1000 ♂

Languages
  - Official: Bhoti; Purgi; Urdu; Hindi; English
  - Regional: Ladakhi, Balti, Brokstat, Changthang, Tibetan
- Time zone: UTC+05:30 (IST)
- Vehicle registration: JK 10 (till 2019) LA-02
- Website: leh.nic.in

Leh district is a district in Indian-administered Ladakh in the disputed Kashmir-region. Ladakh is an Indian-administered union territory. With an area of 45,110 km^{2}. It is bounded on the north by Gilgit-Baltistan's Kharmang and Ghanche districts and Xinjiang's Kashgar Prefecture and Hotan Prefecture, to which it connects via the historic Karakoram Pass. Aksai Chin and Tibet are to the east, Kargil district to the west, and Lahul and Spiti to the south. The district headquarters is in Leh. It lies between 32 and 36 degree north latitude and 75 to 80 degree east longitude.

== History ==
Leh has historically served as the administrative centre of Ladakh. Until 1 July 1979, the entire Ladakh region was administered from Leh. On that date, Ladakh was divided into two administrative districts—Leh and Kargil—with Leh continuing to serve as the administrative headquarters of Leh district. Religious differences between Buddhist and Muslim communities had become a source of grievance by the late 20th century and were among the factors associated with the division of Ladakh into the two districts.

In 2017, Leh district was declared a tobacco-free zone. The Directorate of Health Services Kashmir, through the National Tobacco Control Programme (NTCP), began working toward this designation earlier that year, and Leh was officially declared tobacco-free in August 2017. Rehana Kousar, then in charge of NTCP Kashmir, stated that the initiative involved civil society organisations, religious groups, and women's groups. She particularly highlighted the participation of women in the anti-tobacco campaign as a "major success."

A major administrative change took place in 2019. In August, the Parliament of India passed the Jammu and Kashmir Reorganisation Bill, 2019, which provided for the creation of the Union Territory of Ladakh. The new Union Territory came into existence on 31 October 2019, and Leh became its administrative capital as well as one of its two original districts, alongside Kargil.

Following the Jammu and Kashmir Reorganisation (Removal of Difficulties) Second Order, 2019, the territory claimed as part of Leh district de jure included Gilgit, Gilgit Wazarat, Chilas, and the Tribal Territory, areas that are currently administered by Pakistan. The order also defined the territory of Leh and Ladakh, excluding the then-existing territory of Kargil district.

The administrative structure of Ladakh changed again in 2026. On 27 April 2026, five new districts were formally notified, bringing the total number of districts in the Union Territory to seven. As part of this reorganisation, the boundaries and administrative structure of Leh district were altered. The new districts include the Buddhist-majority districts of Sham, Changthang, Nubra, Leh, and Zanskar, alongside the Muslim-majority districts of Kargil and Drass. Leh district itself contains 44 revenue villages according to the district administration.

== Administration ==
The only sub-division is Kharu. The tehsils are Leh, Basgo, Chushot, Gia and Kharu.

The Ladakh Autonomous Hill Development Council, Leh (LAHDC Leh) is the Autonomous District Council that administers the Leh district.

Sub–divisions, Blocks and Villages in Leh district
Current district	Sub-Division	Tehsil	Blocks	Villages
Leh district	Kharu	Chushot	Chushot	Chushot Yokma, Chushot Gongma, Stakna, Chushot Shamma, Matho, Stok
Leh district	Kharu	Leh	Leh	Gompa Gangless, Sankar Yourtung, Leh Ladakh, Skara, Choglamsar, Saboo, Phyang, Spituk, Phey, Taru, Umla, Rumbak, Sku Marka, Chiling Sumda, Lingshed, Youlchung
Leh district	Kharu	Leh	Thiksey	Thiksey, Nang, Rambirpur, Shey
Leh district	Kharu	Kharu	Kharu	Igoo, Langkor, Shara, Sharnos, Phuktsay, Sakti, Kharu, Chemday, Martselang, Hemis, Shang, Changa
Leh district	Kharu	Gia	Gia	Upshi, Miru, Gia
Leh district	Kharu	Basgo	Basgo	Basgo, Ney, Nimoo
Total	1	5	6	44

== Demographics ==
Sex Ratio in Leh District in 2011 Census. (no. females per 1,000 males)
Religion (and population)	Sex Ratio
Buddhist (pop 88,635)	1,014
Hindu (pop 22,882)	942
Muslim (pop 19,057)	816
Other (pop 2,913)	165
Total (pop 133,487)	690

According to the 2011 census Leh district had a population of 133,487, roughly equal to the nation of Saint Lucia. This gives it a ranking of 609th in India (out of a total of 640). The district has a population density of 3 inhabitants per square kilometre (7.8/sq mi). Its population growth rate over the decade 2001-2011 was 13.87% (it was 30.15% for 1991–2001). Leh has a sex ratio of 690 females for every 1000 males (this varies with religion), and a literacy rate of 77.2%.

=== Religion ===
Religion in Leh district (2011)
Religion	Percent(%)
Buddhism	66.40%
Hinduism	17.14%
Islam	14.28%
Sikhism	0.82%
Other or not stated	1.36%

Block	Buddhist	Muslim	Other
Leh	65.54	12.06	22.40
Nubra	47.43	33	19.57
Khalsi	96.01	1.89	2.10

Leh district: religion, gender ratio, and % urban of population, according to the 2011 Census.
	Hindu	Muslim	Christian	Sikh	Buddhist	Jain	Other	Not stated	Total
Total	22,882	19,057	658	1,092	88,635	103	54	1,006	133,487
Total	17.14%	14.28%	0.49%	0.82%	66.40%	0.08%	0.04%	0.75%	100.00%
Male	21,958	10,493	469	1,018	44,019	49	29	936	78,971
Female	924	8,564	189	74	44,616	54	25	70	54,516
Gender ratio (% female)	4.0%	44.9%	28.7%	6.8%	50.3%	52.4%	46.3%	7.0%	40.8%
Sex ratio (no. females per 1,000 males)	42	816	403	73	1,014	–	–	75	690
Urban	14,542	5,169	358	927	24,023	24	53	575	45,671
Rural	8,340	13,888	300	165	64,612	79	1	431	87,816
% Urban	63.6%	27.1%	54.4%	84.9%	27.1%	23.3%	98.1%	57.2%	34.2%

=== Languages ===
Languages of Leh district (2011)
1. Ladakhi (70.2%)
2. Hindi (12.8%)
3. Balti (3.95%)
4. Tibetan (3.46%)
5. Punjabi (1.02%)
6. Marathi (1.01%)
7. Nepali (1.01%)
8. Others (6.58%)

Ladakhi is the most spoken language, and Hindi/Urdu is the second-largest language, mainly spoken in Leh. Balti is found in Nubra near the boundary with Gilgit-Baltistan. Tibetan, Punjabi, Marathi and Nepali are all mainly spoken in Leh. Urdu and English are widely understood in Leh.

== Politics ==
=== Parliamentary Constituency ===
The district falls under Ladakh Lok Sabha constituency. The present Member of Parliament (MP) of Ladakh is Mohmad Haneefa (independent candidate).

=== Autonomous Hill Council ===
Leh District is administered by an elected body known as the Ladakh Autonomous Hill Development Council, Leh. The LAHDC was established in 1995.

The latest elections were held in October 2020. The BJP secured 15 seats while the INC won 9 and the Independents won 2.

== Transportation ==
=== Road ===
Leh is connected to the rest of India by two high-altitude roads both of which are subject to landslides and neither of which are passable in winter when covered by deep snows. The National Highway 1D from Srinagar via Kargil is generally open longer. The Leh-Manali Highway can be troublesome due to very high passes and plateaus, and the lower but landslide-prone Rohtang Pass near Manali. The third road axis is under construction.

- National Highway 1

The overland approach to Ladakh from the Kashmir valley via the 434-km. National Highway 1 typically remains open for traffic from June to October/November. The most dramatic part of this road journey is the ascent up the 3,505 m (11,500 ft.) high Zoji-la, a tortuous pass in the Great Himalayan Wall. The Jammu and Kashmir State Road Transport Corporation (JKSRTC) operates regular Deluxe and Ordinary bus services between Srinagar and Leh on this route with an overnight halt at Kargil. Taxis (cars and jeeps) are also available at Srinagar for the journey.

- National Highway 3 or Leh-Manali Highway

Since 1989, the 473-km Leh-Manali Highway has been serving as the second land approach to Ladakh. Open for traffic from June to late October, this high road traverses the upland desert plateaux of Rupsho whose altitude ranges from 3,660 m to 4,570 m. There are a number of high passes en route among which the highest one, known as Tanglang La, is sometimes (but incorrectly) claimed to be the world's second-highest motorable pass at an altitude of 5,325 m. (17,469 feet).

- Nimmu–Padam–Darcha road

This is the third road axis to Leh. It is currently under construction.

=== Air ===
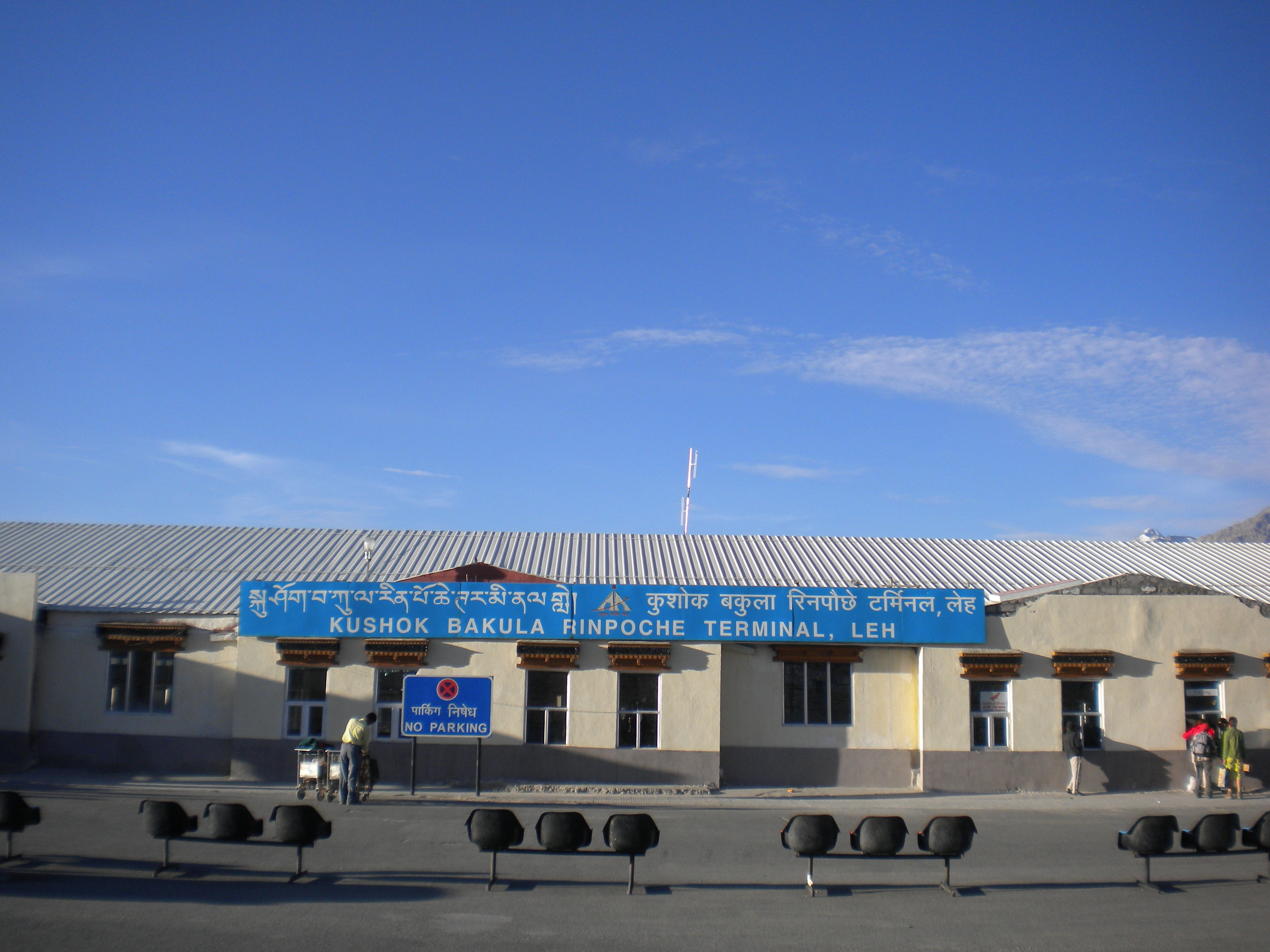
Kushok Bakula Rimpochee Airport

Leh's Leh Kushok Bakula Rimpochee Airport has flights to Delhi at least daily on Air India which also provides twice-weekly services to Jammu and a weekly flight to Srinagar. Passengers connect in Delhi for other destinations. Go First operates Delhi to Leh daily flights during peak time.

=== Rail ===
There is no railway service currently in Ladakh, however, 2 railway routes are proposed- the Bhanupli–Leh line and Srinagar–Kargil–Leh line.

== Gallery ==
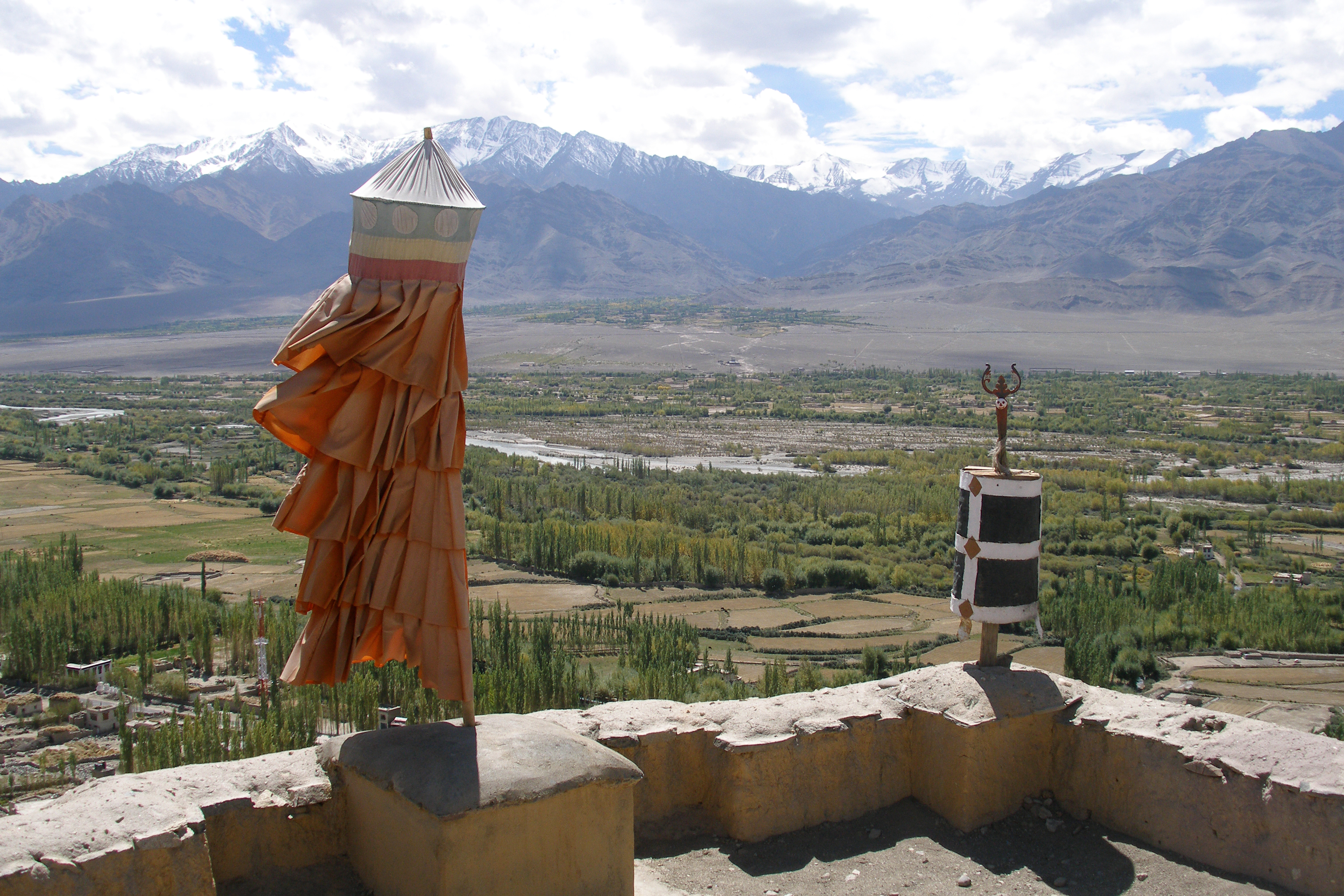
Indus River Valley in Thiksey

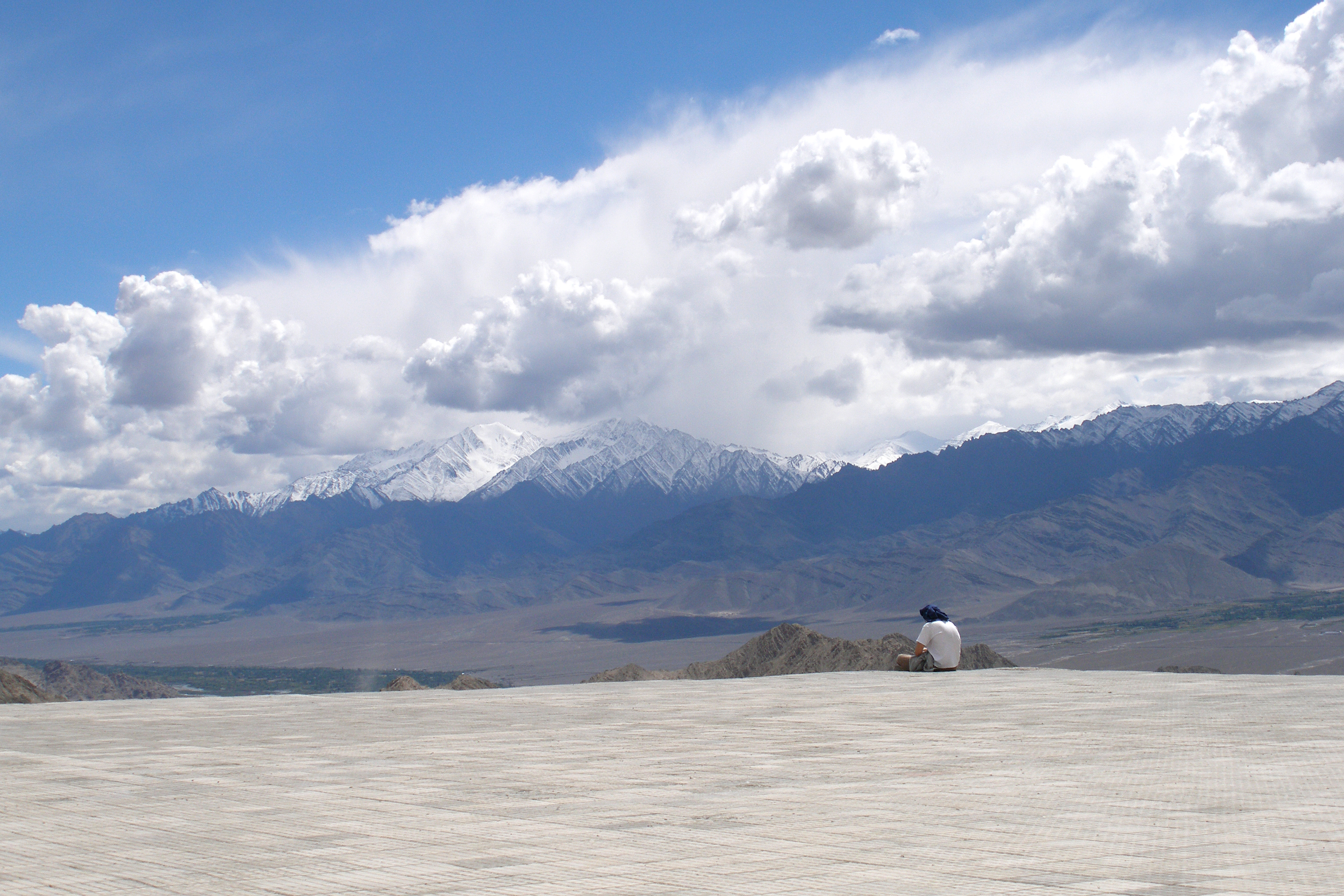
Indus Valley in Leh

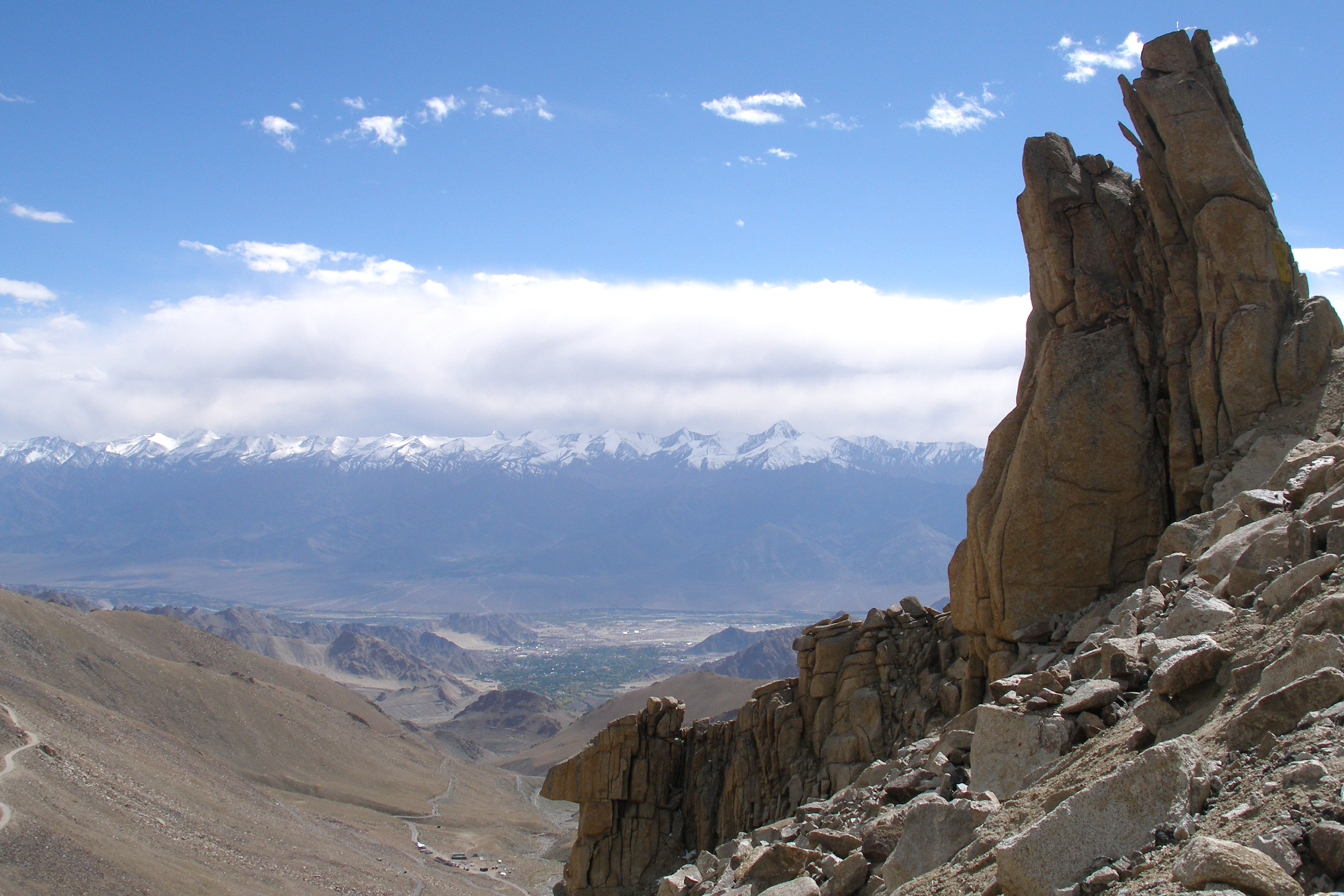
Khardung La pass in Ladakh Range

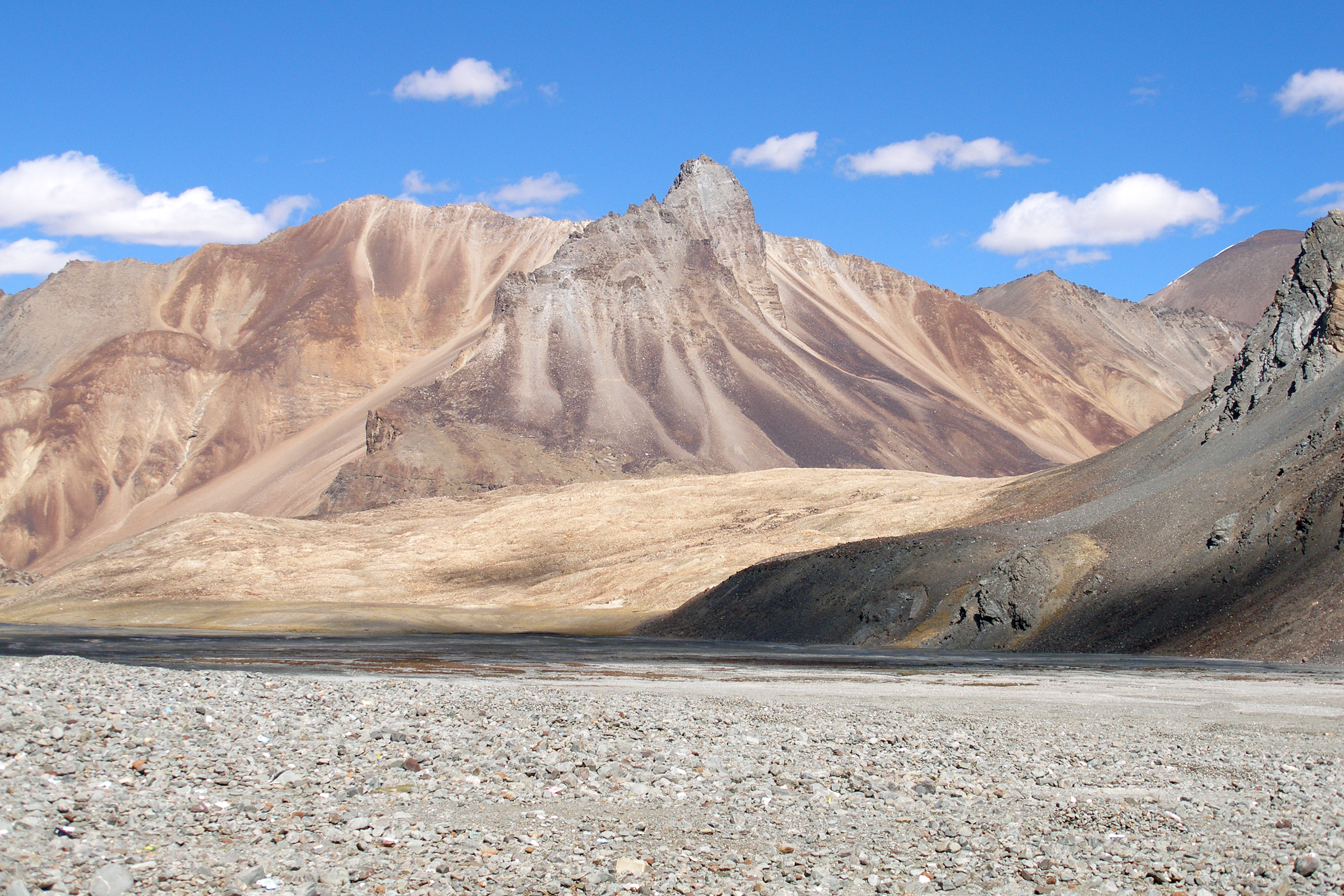
Rock formations along Leh-Manali Highway

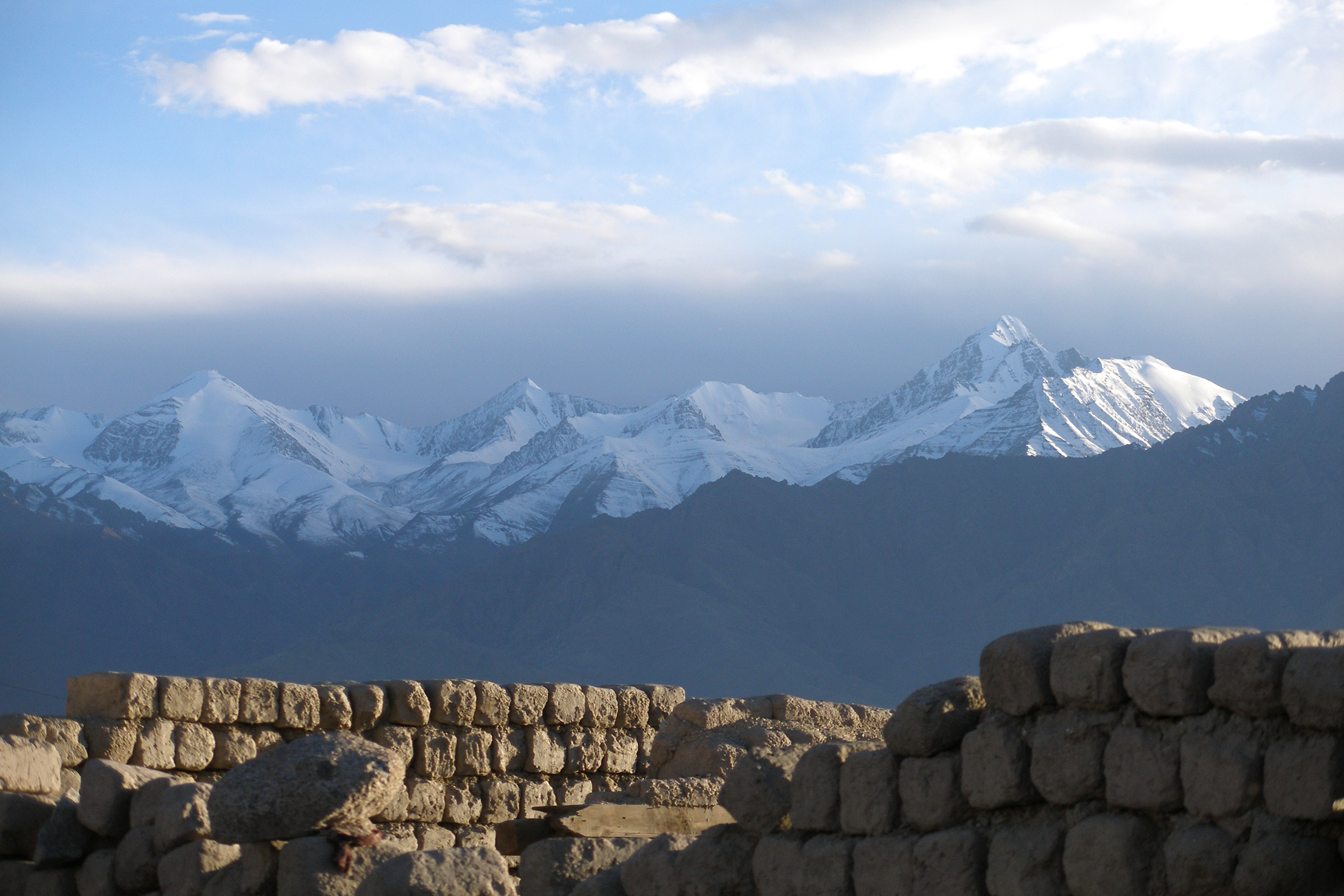
Mountain peaks around Leh

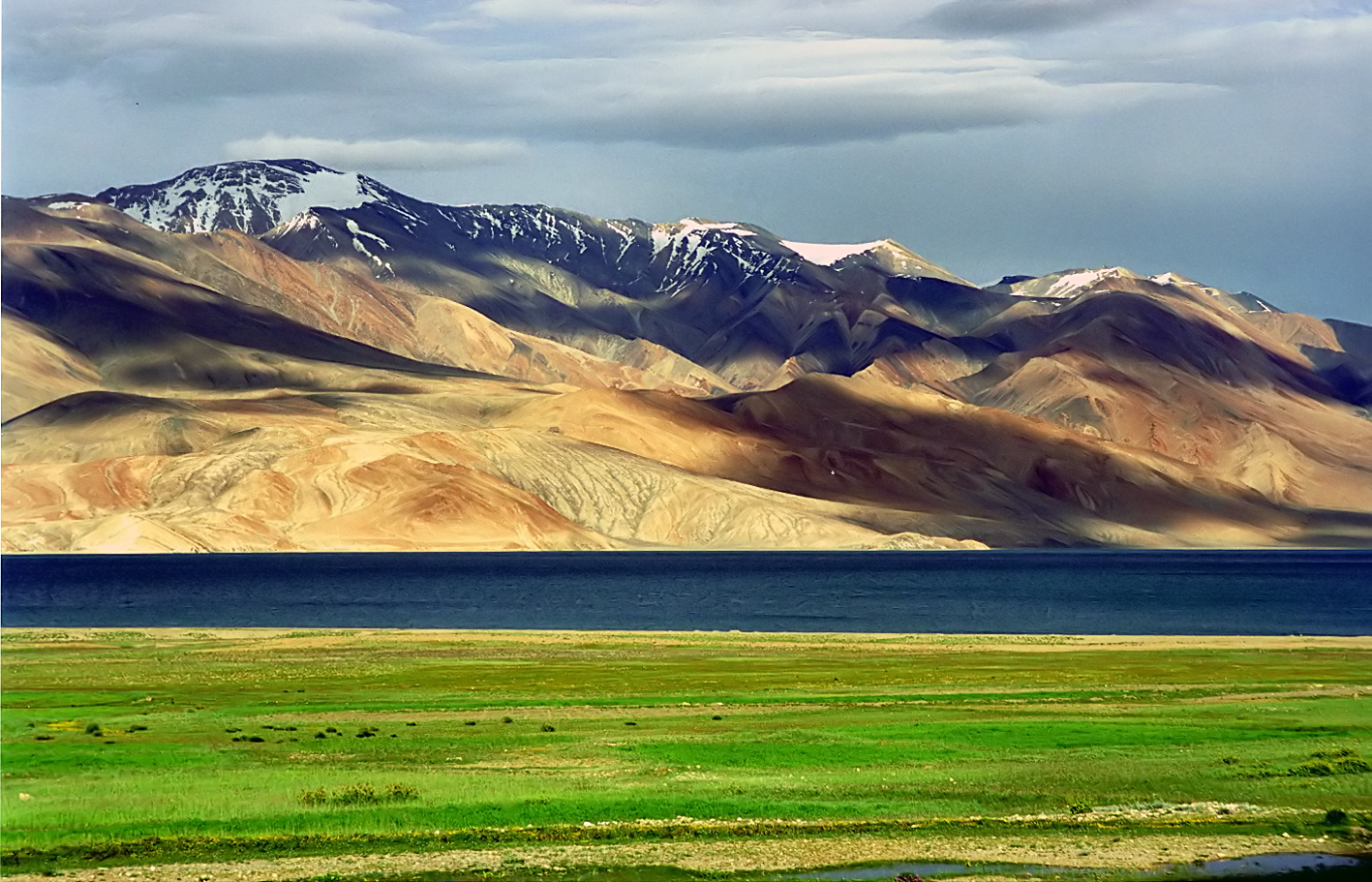
Tsomoriri lake

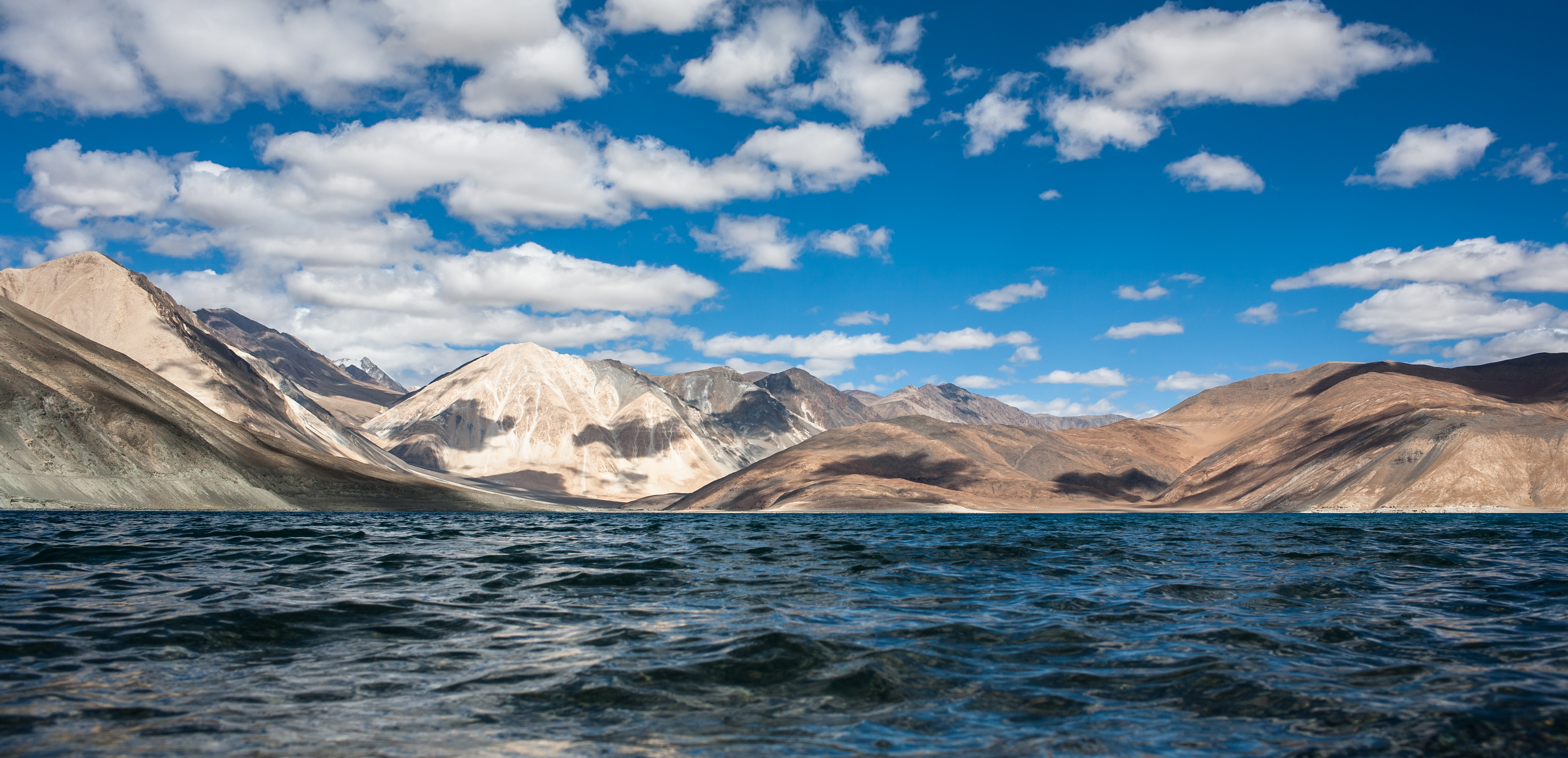
Pangong lake

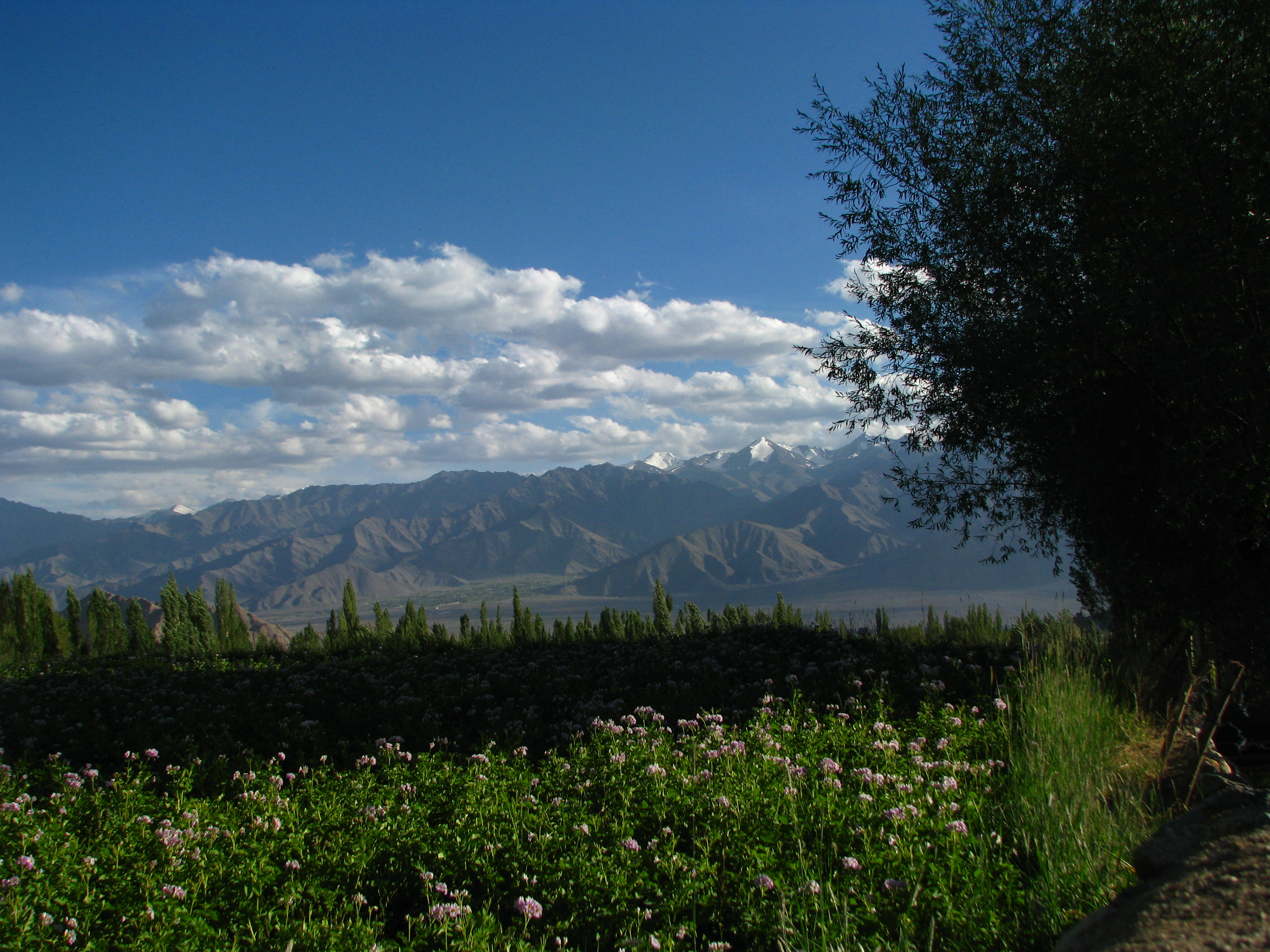
Leh district flower fields and mountains

== See also ==
- List of districts of Ladakh
- Geography of Ladakh
- Tourism in Ladakh
