= Gya, Ladakh =

Gya rGya Gia
- Town
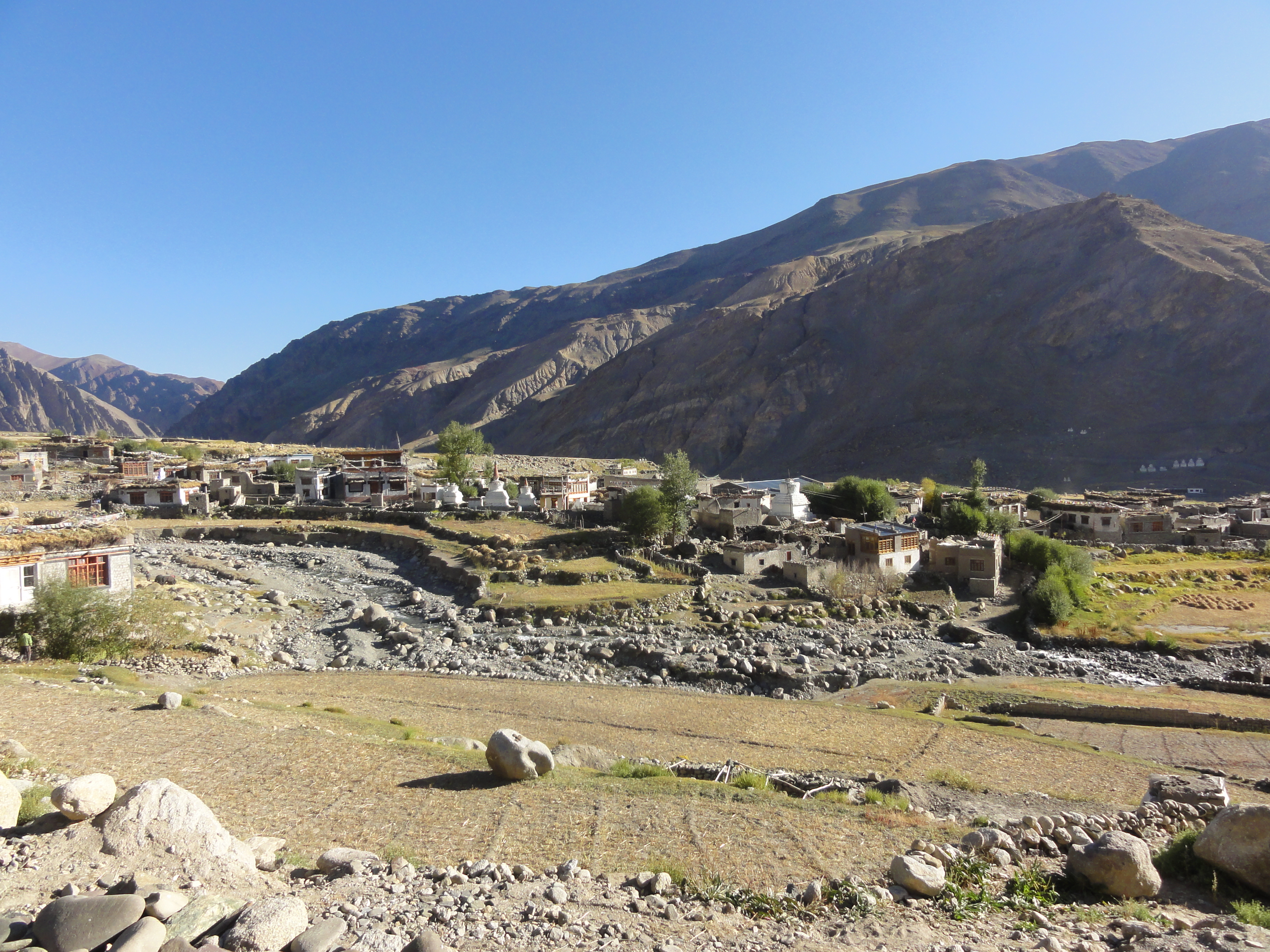
- Gya Village

- Location in Ladakh Gya (India)
- Coordinates: 33.280068°N 77.938785°E
- Country: India
- Union Territory: Ladakh
- District: Leh
- Tehsil: Gia

Population (2011)
  - Total: 658

Languages
  - Official: Hindi, English
- Time zone: UTC+5:30 (IST)
- Census code: 894

Gya (Wylie: rGya) or Gia is a Town and one of the tehsil in the Leh district of Ladakh in India. It is located off the Leh–Manali Highway, close to Tso Kar.

The village overlooks the Gya river in the Ladakh region, between the Indus river valley and Tanglang La Pass on the Leh-Manali Highway. Accessible from Upshi in the Indus River Valley, the village is located in the gorge created by the River Gya. A Buddhist Gompa with accompanying chortens or stupas is situated above the village and the gorge.

Most of the people are engaged in agriculture adopting organic farming. The village is still protected with its old heritage and culture for which countless tourist love to visit there.

== Demographics ==
According to the 2011 census of India, Gya has 140 households. The effective literacy rate (i.e. the literacy rate of population excluding children aged 6 and below) is 58.67%.

Demographics (2011 Census)
| | Total | Male | Female |
|---|---|---|---|
| Population | 658 | 301 | 357 |
| Children aged below 6 years | 87 | 39 | 48 |
| Scheduled caste | 0 | 0 | 0 |
| Scheduled tribe | 657 | 301 | 356 |
| Literates | 335 | 172 | 163 |
| Workers (all) | 365 | 177 | 188 |
| Main workers (total) | 103 | 80 | 23 |
| Main workers: Cultivators | 58 | 50 | 8 |
| Main workers: Agricultural labourers | 0 | 0 | 0 |
| Main workers: Household industry workers | 0 | 0 | 0 |
| Main workers: Other | 45 | 30 | 15 |
| Marginal workers (total) | 262 | 97 | 165 |
| Marginal workers: Cultivators | 196 | 64 | 132 |
| Marginal workers: Agricultural labourers | 0 | 0 | 0 |
| Marginal workers: Household industry workers | 0 | 0 | 0 |
| Marginal workers: Others | 66 | 33 | 33 |
| Non-workers | 293 | 124 | 169 |
