= Spituk =

- Census Town
- Location in Ladakh Spituk (India)
- Coordinates: 34.1152448°N 77.554777°E
- Country: India
- Union territory: Ladakh
- District: Leh
- Tehsil: Leh

Population (2011)
  - Total: 4,047

Languages
  - Official: Hindi, English
- Time zone: UTC+5:30 (IST)

Spituk or Spaythub is a census town located in the Leh district of Ladakh, India.

Spituk was originally known as "Pethup", meaning "Exemplary" in the local language.
