= Kharoo =

Kharoo (Kharu)
- Village
- Location in Ladakh, India Kharoo (Kharu) (India)
- Coordinates: 33.9198799°N 77.8703918°E
- Country: India
- Union Territory: Ladakh
- District: Leh
- Tehsil: Kharu
- Elevation: 4,100 m (13,500 ft)

Population (2011)
  - Total: 167

Languages
  - Official: Hindi, English
- Time zone: UTC+5:30 (IST)
- 2011 census code: 869

Kharoo, also spelt Kharu, is a town and headquarter of eponymous tehsil in the Leh district in the union territory of Ladakh, India.

== Demographics ==
According to the 2011 census of India, Kharoo has 42 households. The effective literacy rate (i.e. the literacy rate of population excluding children aged 6 and below) is 66.45%.

Demographics (2011 Census)
	Total	Male	Female
Population	167	77	90
Children aged below 6 years	15	7	8
Scheduled caste	0	0	0
Scheduled tribe	167	77	90
Literates	101	53	48
Workers (all)	89	47	42
Main workers (total)	49	44	5
Main workers: Cultivators	19	19	0
Main workers: Agricultural labourers	0	0	0
Main workers: Household industry workers	1	1	0
Main workers: Other	29	24	5
Marginal workers (total)	40	3	37
Marginal workers: Cultivators	17	1	16
Marginal workers: Agricultural labourers	0	0	0
Marginal workers: Household industry workers	0	0	0
Marginal workers: Others	23	2	21
Non-workers	78	30	48

== See also ==
- Karu
- Geography of Ladakh
- Tourism in Ladakh
