= Suraj Tal =

Lake in Himachal Pradesh, India

Suraj Tal Surya Tal

- Location within Himachal Pradesh
- Location: CB Range, Lahaul Valley, Himachal
- Coordinates: 32°45′46″N 77°23′52″E
- Type: High altitude Lake
- Primary inflows: Glacier and Snow melt
- Primary outflows: Bhaga River
- Basin countries: India
- Shore length^{1}: 4 km (2.5 mi)
- Surface elevation: 4,883 m (16,020.3 ft)
- Frozen: During winter
- ^{1} Shore length is not a well-defined measure.

Suraj Tal, also called Tso Kamtsi or Surya Tal, is an 800 m (2,600 ft) long lake that lies just below the 4,890 m (16,040 ft) high Bara-lacha-la pass in Lahaul and Spiti district of the Indian state of Himachal Pradesh. It is the third-highest lake in India and the 21st-highest in the world. Suraj Tal Lake is just below the source of the Bhaga River that joins the Chandra River downstream at Tandi to form the Chandrabhaga River in Himachal Pradesh. The Chandrabhaga River is known as the Chenab as it enters the Jammu region of Jammu and Kashmir. The other major tributary of the Chandrabhaga, the Chandra, originates and flows south-east of the Bara-lacha La.

== Access ==
Suraj Tal is 65 km (40 mi) from Keylong, the district headquarters of the Lahaul Spiti district. It is accessible by National Highway NH 21, also known as the Leh-Manali Highway. The road skirts Suraj Tal, which is just 3 km (1.9 mi) short of the Bara-lacha-la pass. It remains inaccessible during the winter months of November to April since the pass becomes totally snowbound during this period.

== Physical description ==
=== Terrain ===
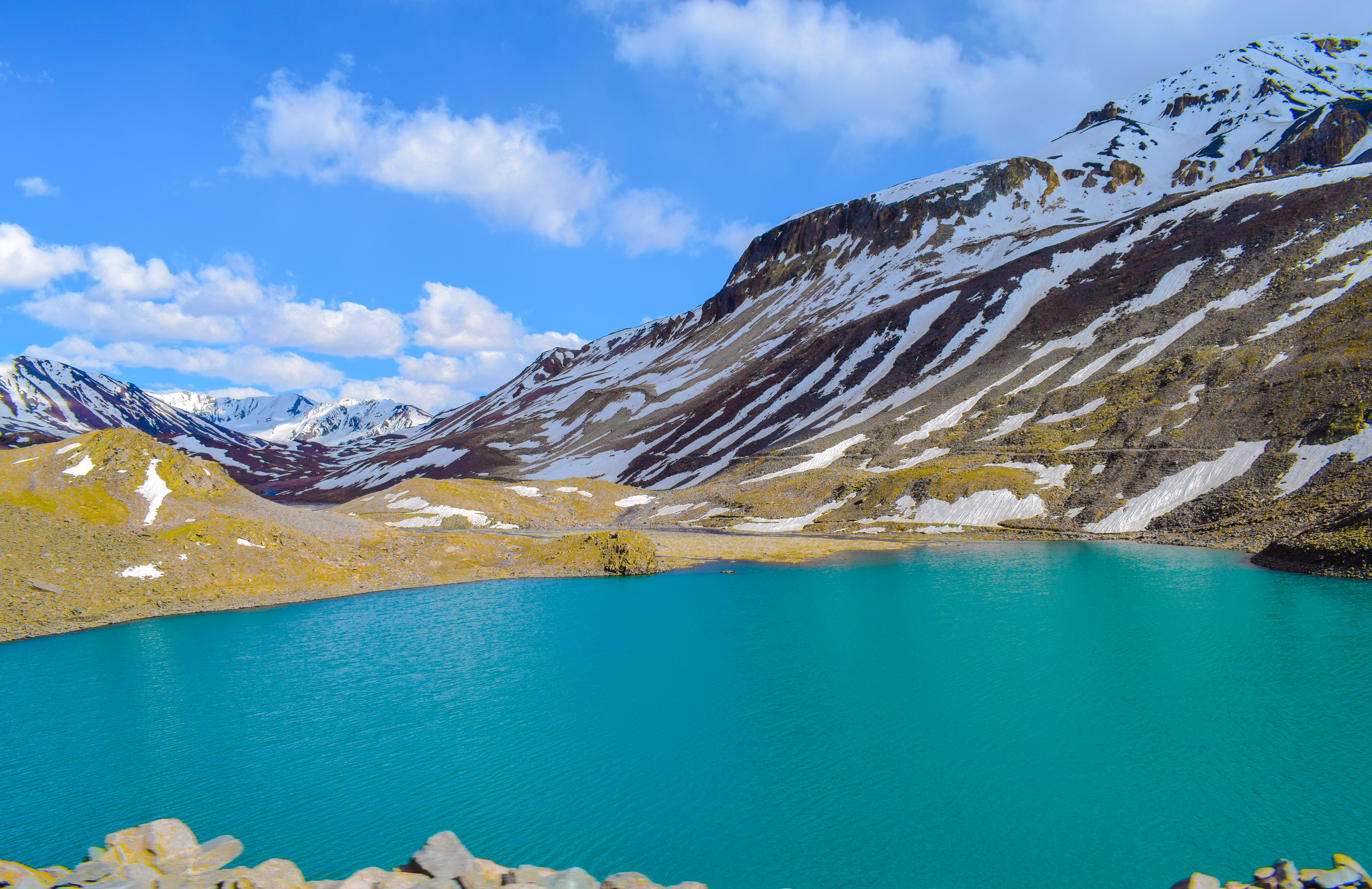
View of Suraj Tal towards Bara-lacha La

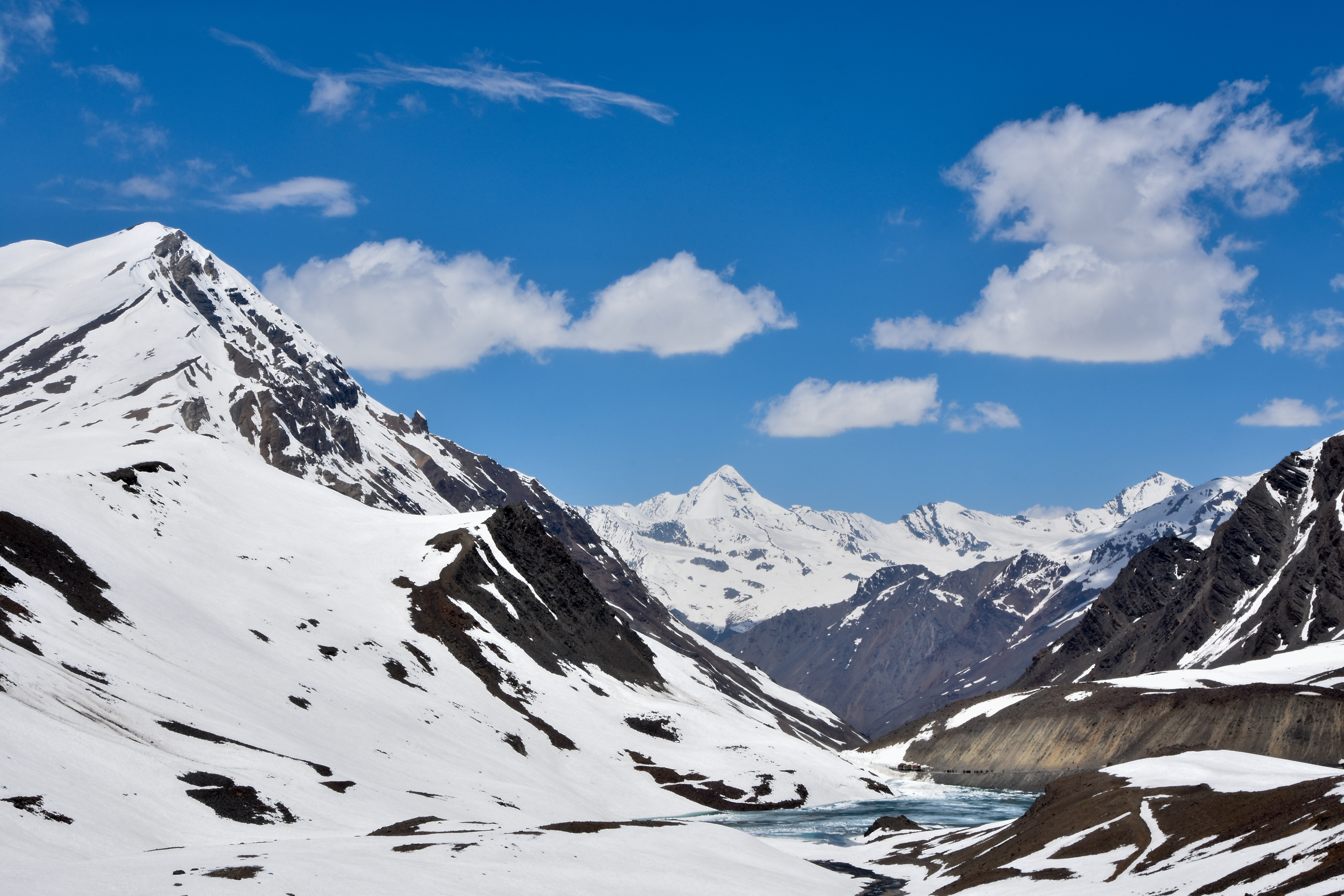
View of Suraj Tal down the Bhaga valley

The glaciers and nullahs (streams) that from the Bara-lacha-la pass feed the lake. The pass is 8 km long and is also called the "Pass with Crossroads on Summit" since roads from Zanskar, Ladakh, Spiti, and Lahaul meet at this pass. In addition to the Bhaga River that originates from it and flows through Suraj Tal, Bara-lacha-la Pass is also the source of the Chandra and Yunan Rivers in the southeast and north, respectively.

The lake is situated in the Upper Himalayan Zone, or High Latitudinal Zone part of the Himalayas which has very sparse population with climatic conditions akin to polar conditions. Snowfall in this zone, though scanty, is reported to be spread throughout the year. Rainfall is rare in the region. Snow precipitation from snow storms is reported to be less than 200 mm (7.9 in) of snow in nearly 50% of the storms, even though one observatory in the region has reported 800 mm (31 in) of snowfall. The precipitation starts melting in May. Snow on slopes is generally slackly bonded, with the wind redistributing it. The average total snowfall recorded in a year is reported to be 12–15 m (39–49 ft), with the highest temperature at 13 °C (55 °F), the mean highest temperature at 0.5 °C (32.9 °F), the mean minimum temperature at −11.7 °C (10.9 °F), and the lowest temperature at −27 °C (−17 °F). The ground in the zone is covered with scree and boulders.

=== Geology ===
The lake's geology is similar to that of the nearby Bara-lacha-la Pass, which is reported to be an early rifting event on the northern Indian passive margin, and the Basalts which are emplaced along the trans–tensional faults indicate that.

=== Bhaga Valley ===
The Bhaga River originates in Bara-Lacha La and flows north-west through Suraj Tal to Tandi, the confluence point with the Chandra River. The Bhaga Valley (Tod or Stod Valley) is 72 km (45 mi) long. The valley, which is a narrow gorge, is devoid of any vegetation up to Darcha, and thereafter it widens up to its confluence with the Chandra River at Tandi. There are terraces between Darcha and Tandi which are under cultivation in the lower slopes, with the middle slopes having grasslands. Plantations of trees and shrubs to meet fuel wood and fodder requirements have been done on the hill slopes.

== Tourism ==
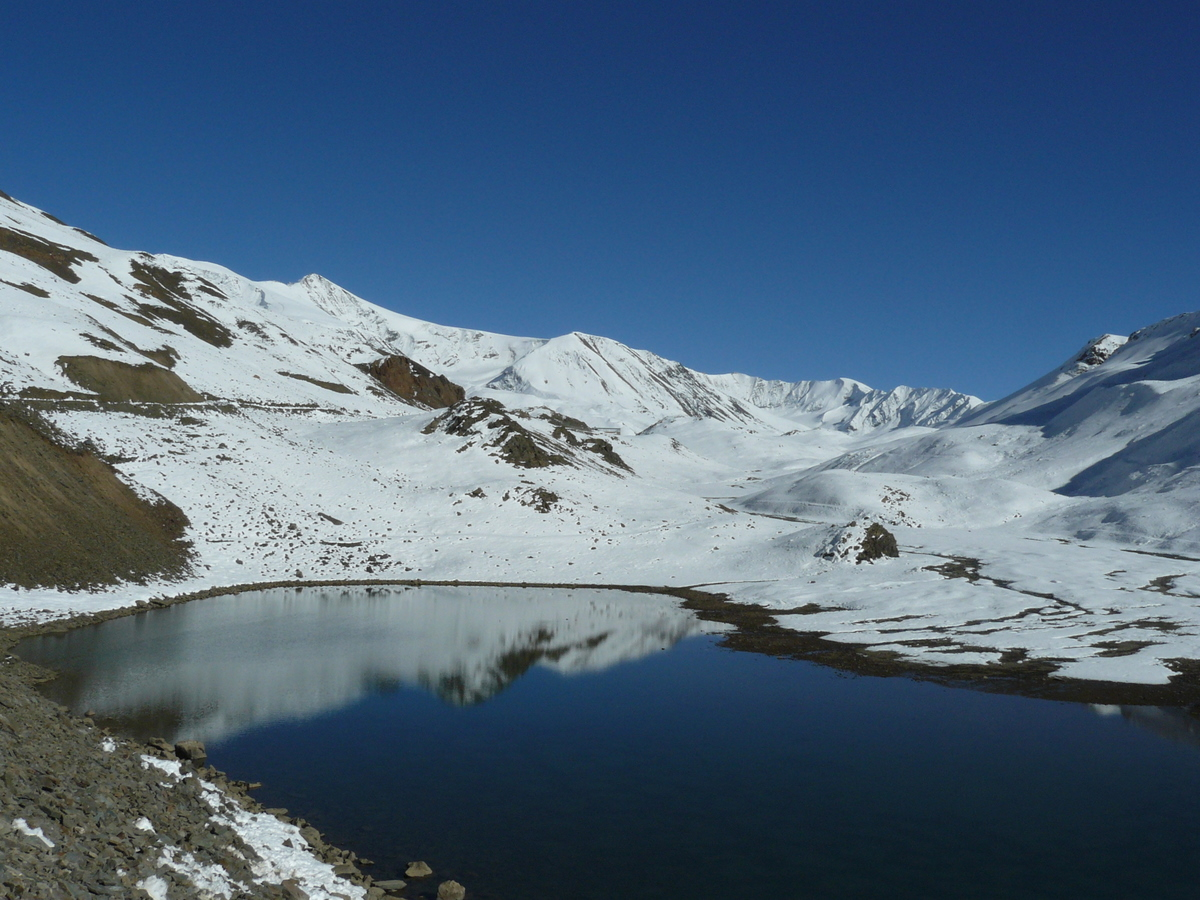
National Highway skirting the lake on the left

Lahaul-Spiti Valley is a common destination for Indian and foreign tourists on road trips, trekking, and motorcycling. The NH 21 route from Manali to Leh covers the Suraj Tal Lake and the Bara-lacha-la pass.

=== Trekking ===
Trekking tours are common. One trek route is the Zingzingbar–Suraj Tal–Bara-lacha-la. This involves trekking along the Bhaga River for 3 km (1.9 mi), crossing a bridge to the north bank, then a further climb of 2.5 km (1.6 mi) from the bridge, followed by a steep foot trail up to Suraj Tal.
