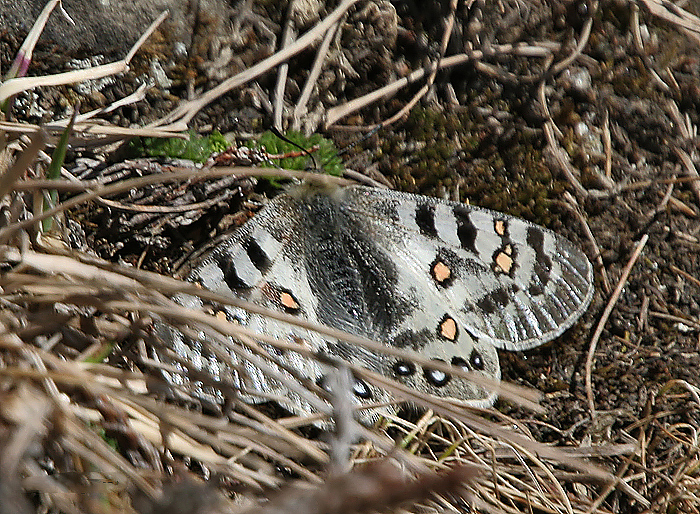
- At Biskeri Ridge (13,800 feet (4,200 m)) in Kullu district of Himachal Pradesh, India

Scientific classification
- Kingdom: Animalia
- Phylum: Arthropoda
- Class: Insecta
- Order: Lepidoptera
- Family: Papilionidae
- Genus: Parnassius
- Species: P. hardwickii

Binomial name
- Parnassius hardwickii Gray, 1831

= Parnassius hardwickii =

Common blue Apollo

Species of butterfly

Parnassius hardwickii, the common blue Apollo, is a high-altitude butterfly which is found in South Asia. It is a member of the snow Apollo genus (Parnassius) of the swallowtail family (Papilionidae). This butterfly is found from the Chitral District to Sikkim and is found from 6,000 to 17,000 feet (1,800 to 5,200 m), making it one of the most commonly encountered species of Apollo in the Indian subcontinent.

== Description ==
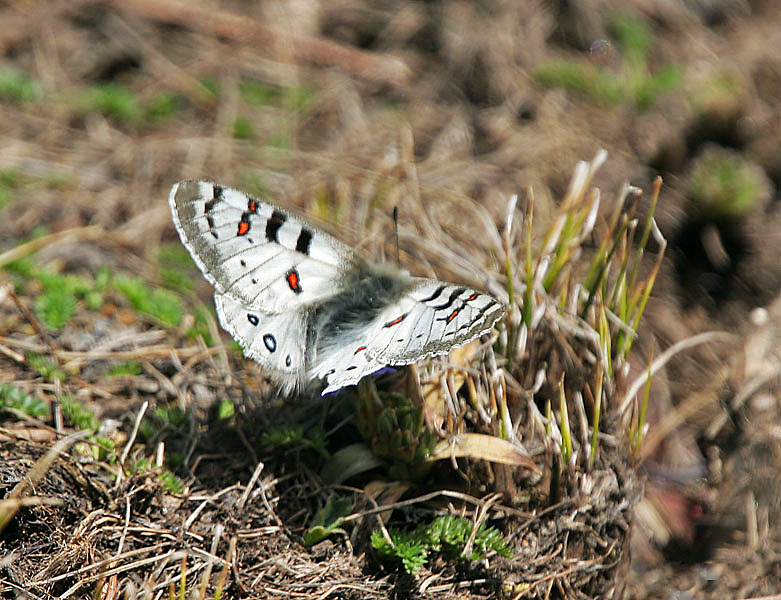
At Biskeri Ridge (13,800 feet (4,200 m)) in Kullu district of Himachal Pradesh, India

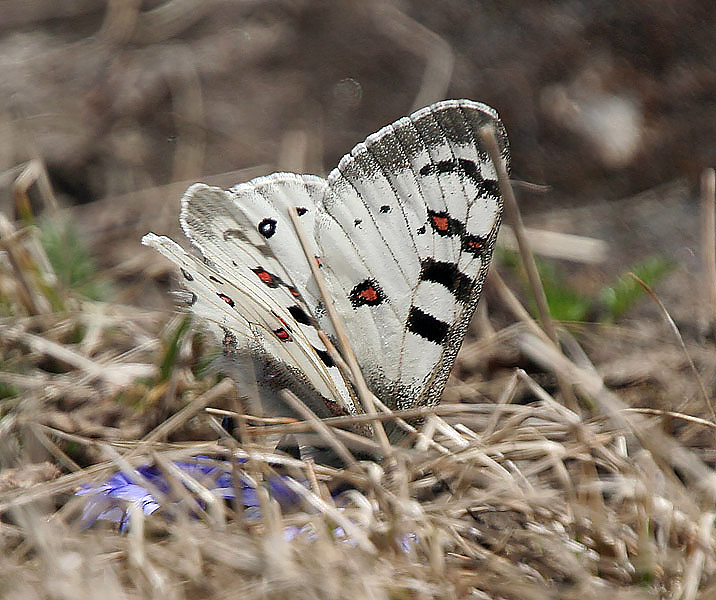
At Biskeri Ridge (13,800 feet (4,200 m)) in Kullu district of Himachal Pradesh, India

Male upperside creamy-white. Forewing: base and costal margin densely irrorated (sprinkled) with black scales; a broad short velvety black bar across middle of cell, another along the discocellulars and a third beyond apex of cell, this last with superposed spots of crimson where the bar crosses the bases of interspaces 5 and 8; a crimson-centred black spot in middle of interspace 1; an irregularly curved prominent postdiscal series of dusky-black spots, so arranged as to leave a narrow edging of the creamy-white ground colour beyond, which is traversed by the black veins; the upper four spots of the postdiscal series fused to form a broad, continuous, but short, curved band; the terminal margin broadly dusky black; the cilia white. Both the dusky-black band and the postdiscal dusky-black markings subhyaline (almost glass like). Hindwing: base and dorsal margin broadly dusky black, the inner margin of the black colouration on the latter deeply but irregularly bi-emarginate; a crimson-centred black spot near base of interspace 5, another just beyond the middle of interspace 7, followed by a very conspicuous curved postdiscal series of five dull blue ocelli ringed with black and centred with white, and a narrow diffuse dusky black terminal band; cilia as in the forewing. Underside: similar, with a glassy appearance. Forewing: with the markings of the upperside visible by transparency; the white scaling of the upperside replaced by scale-like hairs of the same colour; the only scaled markings are the medial and apical transverse black bars in cell, three small crimson spots beyond and the black-encircled crimson spot in middle of interspace 1. Hindwing: the white scaling along the basal half of the costal margin nearly as on the upperside, the rest hair-like as on the underside of the forewing; a broad basal band of four crimson or vermilion-red spots followed by a discal irregular series of five similarly-coloured spots, the lower three formed into a short obliquely transverse band above the tornal angle; all the crimson spots encircled more or less obsoletely by black rings, and the following prominently centred with white: the spot in interspaces 2 and 5 and the basal and medial spots in interspace 7.

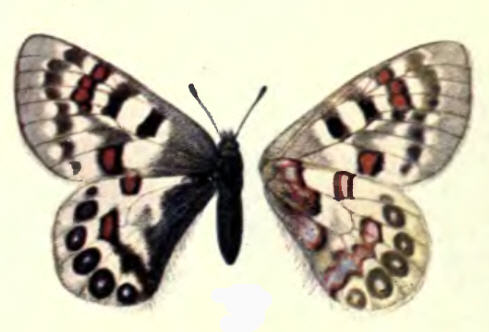
Female

Female similar; the dusky black irroration on the upperside of the forewing more extensive and formed into a narrow irregular band below the cell, which runs between the crimson spots beyond the cell-apex and the crimson spot in interspace 1; the crimson spots are larger, with an additional spot in interspace 6 of the forewing and a pretornal spot on the hindwing. Underside: similar to that of the male but all the red spots much larger and with white scaling in the centre. Antennae nearly black, with only a few white specks, head with brownish-yellow pubescence; rest of the thorax and abdomen covered densely with long white hairs which also clothe, more or less narrowly, the dorsal margin of the hindwing.

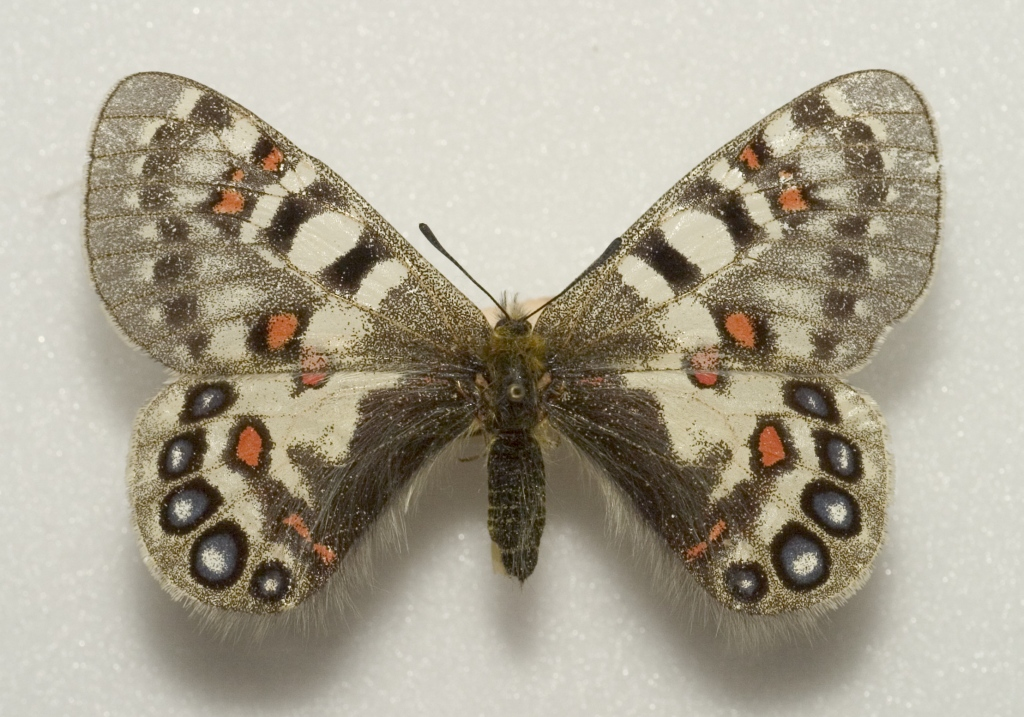
Specimen from Koksar, Ulster Museum

== Range ==
Himalayas, northern range of India (included Sikkim), Pakistan, Nepal, Tibet and other parts of China.

== Status ==
It is not known to be threatened.

== See also ==
- Papilionidae
- List of butterflies of India
- List of butterflies of India (Papilionidae)

== Other references ==
- Sakai S., Inaoka S., Toshiaki A., Yamaguchi S., Watanabe Y., (2002) The Parnassiology. The Parnassius Butterflies, A Study in Evolution, Kodansha, Japan. ISBN 4-06-124051-X
- Weiss J.-C., (1999) Parnassiinae of the World - Part 3, Hillside Books, Canterbury, UK. ISBN 0-9532240-2-3
