= Sarchu =

- Seasonal Tents
- Location in India Sarchu (India)
- Coordinates: 32.89°N 77.53°E
- Country: India
- Union Territory: Ladakh
- District: Leh

Languages
- Time zone: UTC+5:30 (IST)

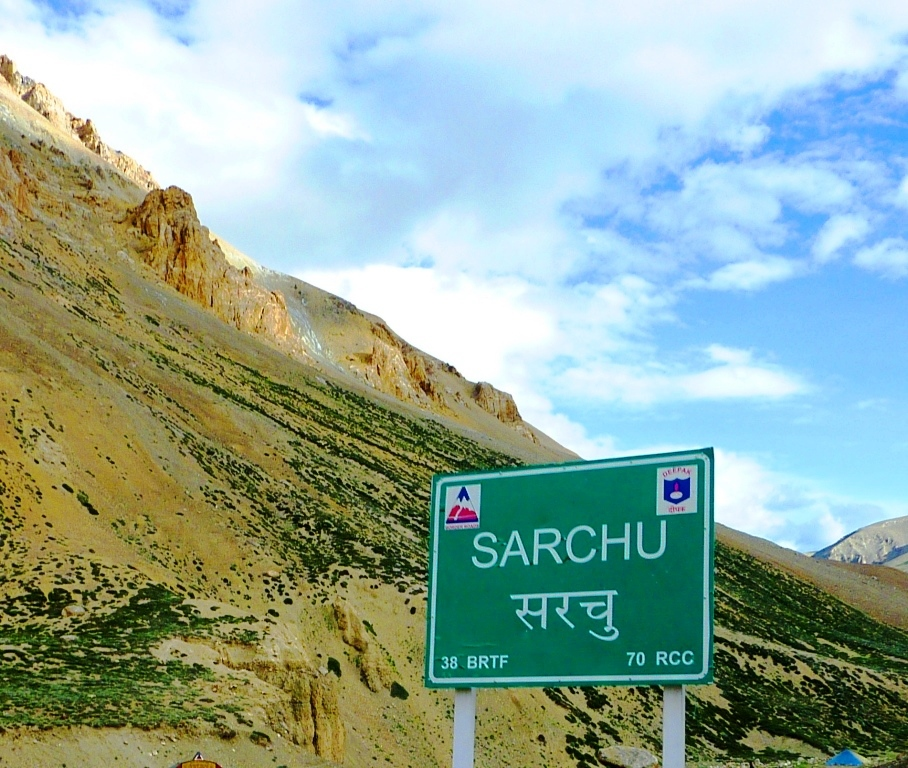
Sarchu roadsign

Sarchu (also known as Sir Bhum Chun) is a major halt point with tented accommodation in the Himalayas on the Leh-Manali Highway, on the boundary between Himachal Pradesh and Ladakh in India. It is situated between Baralacha La to the south and Lachulung La to the north, at an altitude of 4,201 m (13,783 ft).

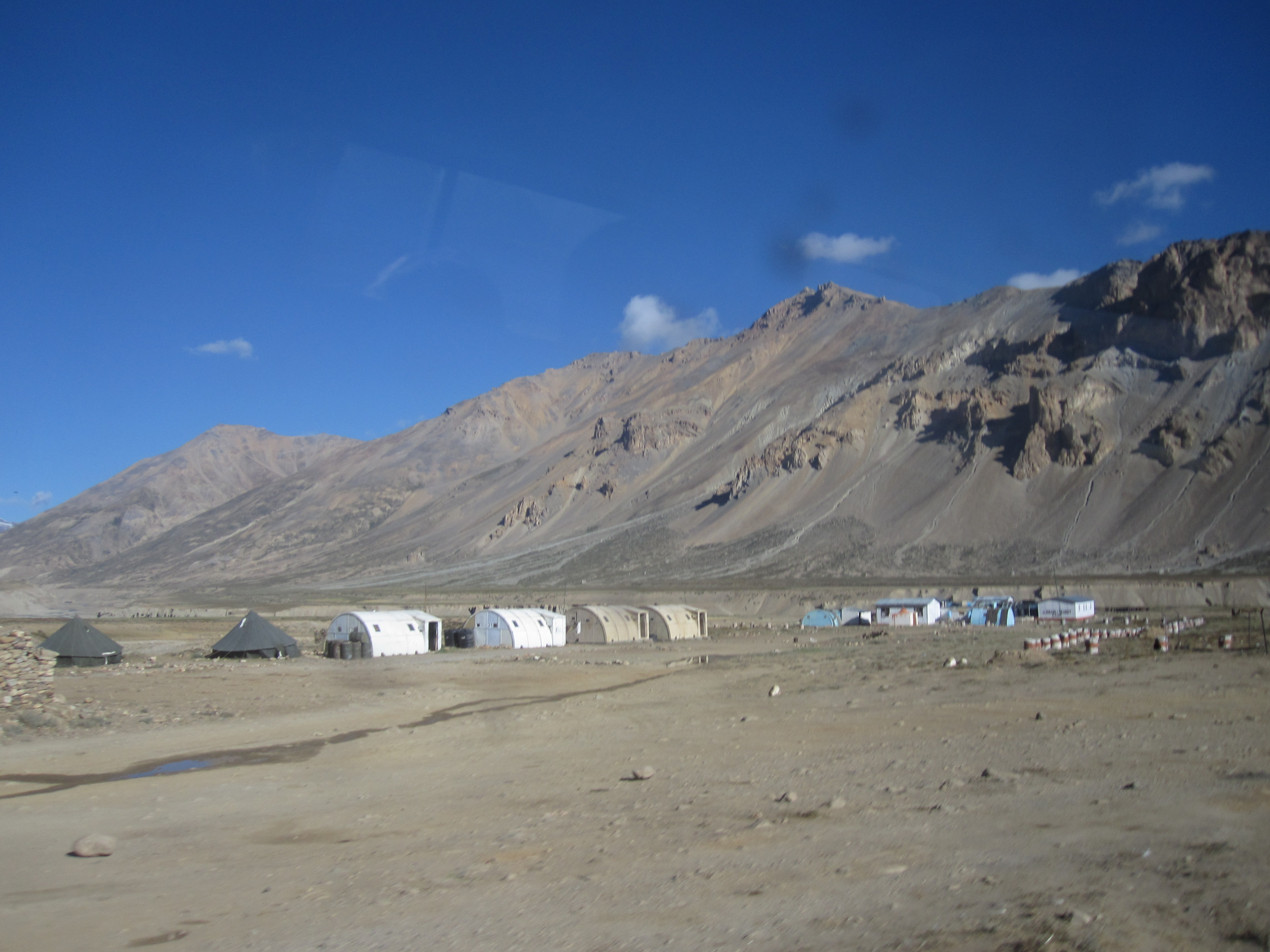
Row of Tents at Sarchu

The journey along the Manali-Leh highway normally takes two days, so travellers and tourists stop overnight here. An Indian army camp is sited nearby on the banks of the Tsarap Chu river. The highway and the camp are closed during the winter, when snow blocks the high passes along the road.

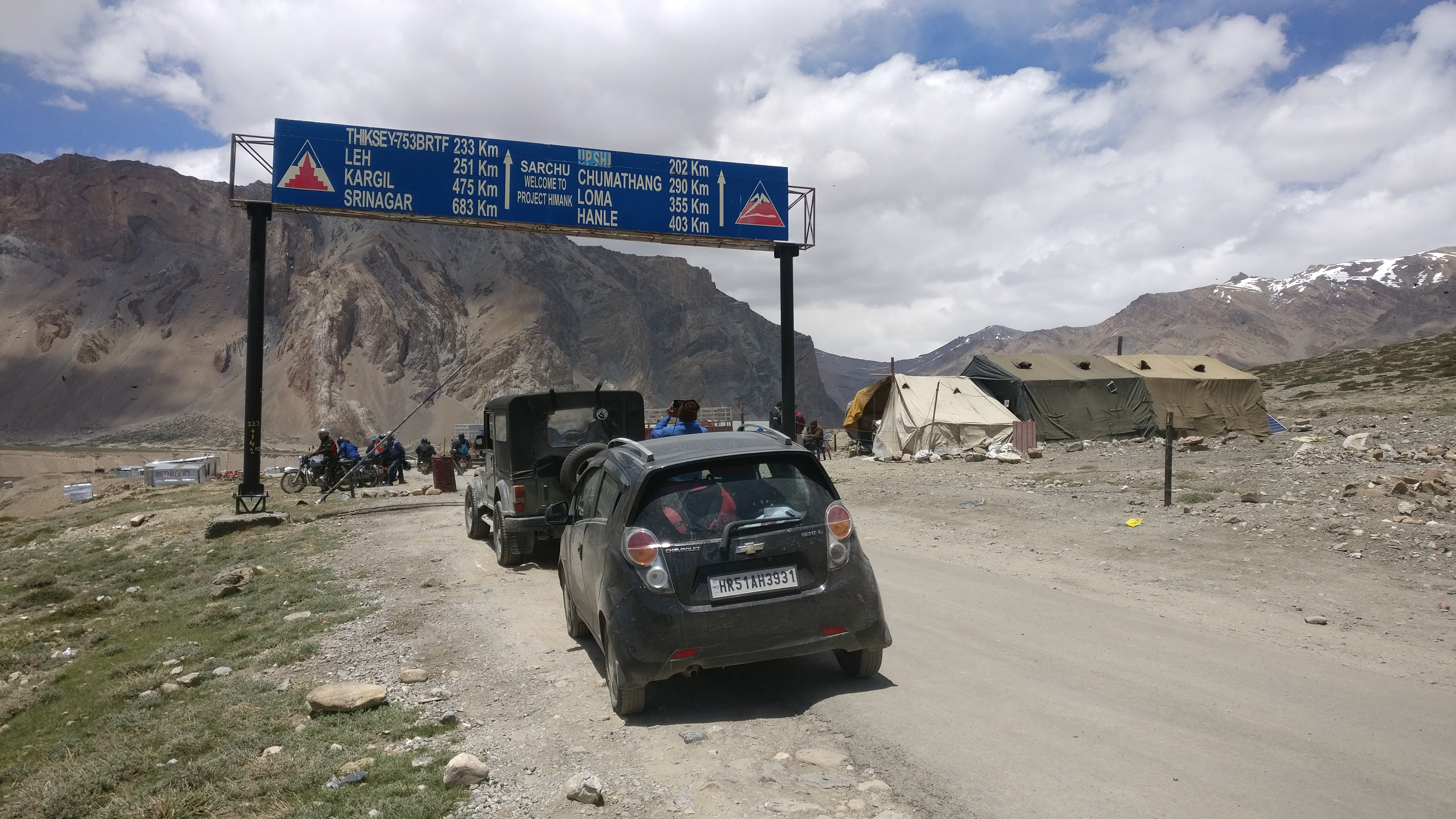
Highway distance sign board at Sarchu

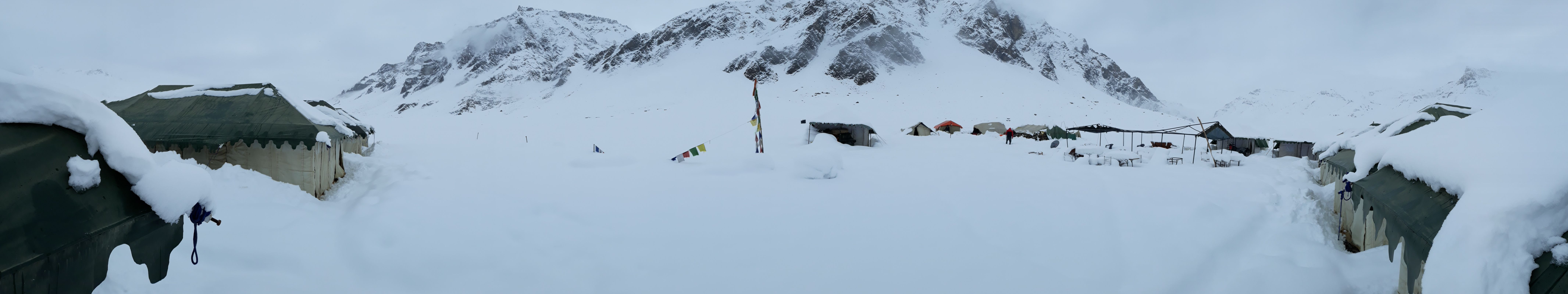
Surprise snowfall at Sarchu

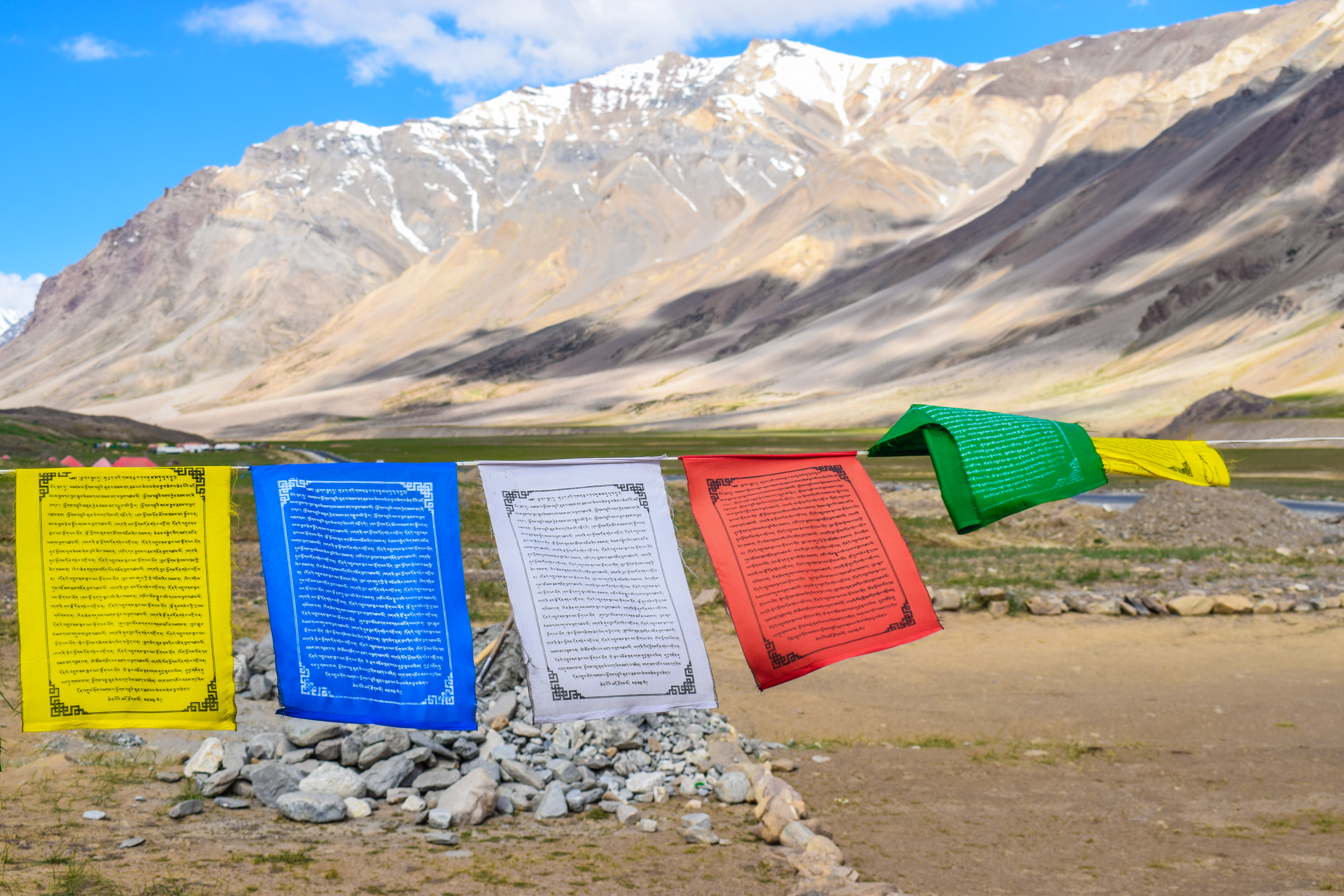
Prayer flag outside of campside at Sarchu

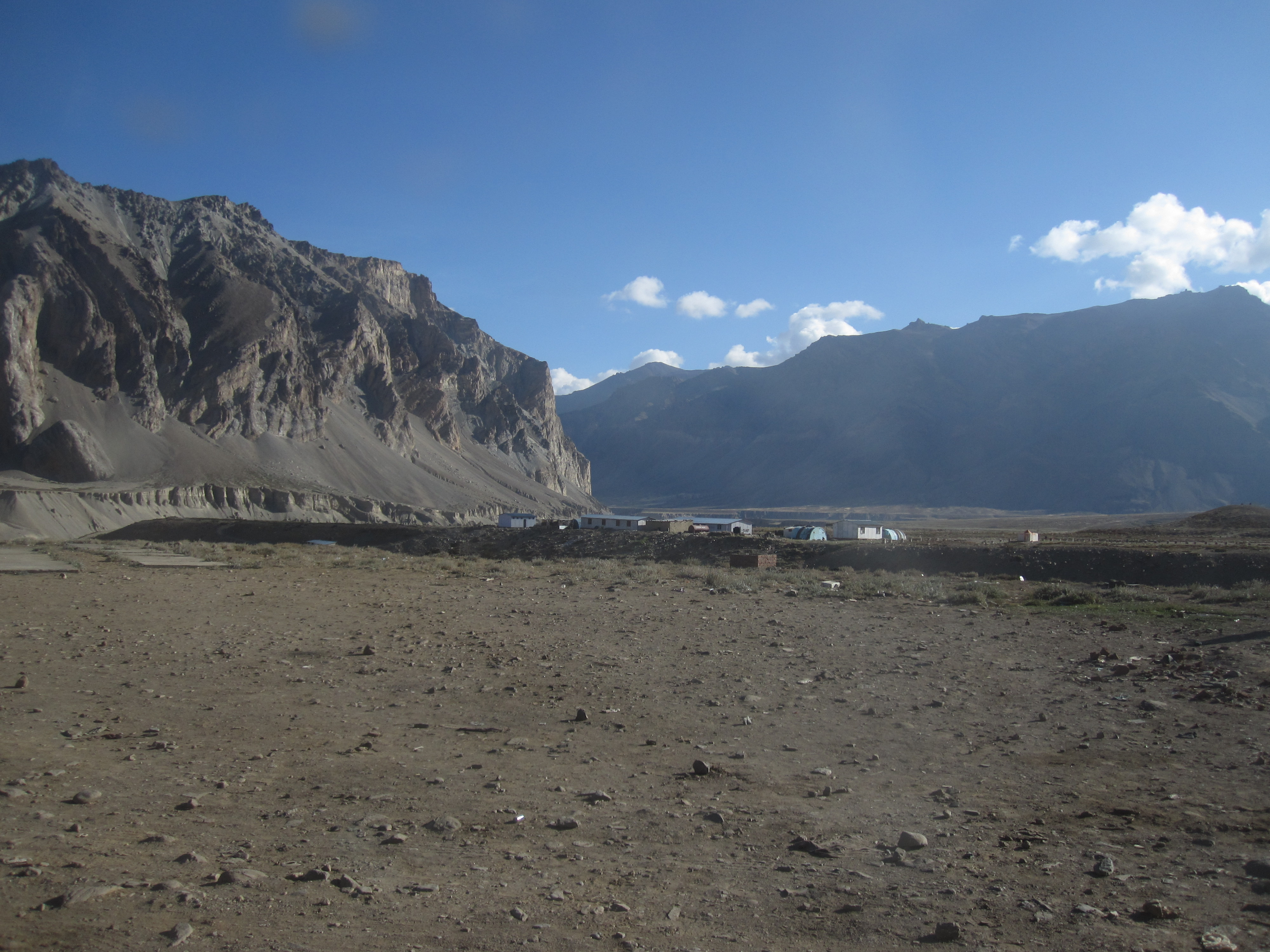
Tented accommodation at Sarchu

== Geography ==
Earlier known for its significance as the old Silk Route. It is still popular amongst traders of Himalayas, itinerant clans and adventure seekers.

Sarchu is of great importance mainly due to its location on the Leh-Manali highway, with its barren landscape resembling Ladakh. The place can be visited between June and September when the snow melts and the Leh-Manali highway is open for traffic. Sarchu is an important route for Ladakh Manali Highway.

Sarchu is the starting point for Zanskar Trek of Ladakh. The trek is considered highly challenging, as it includes exploring through remote crevasses, crossing high passes and waterways.

== Boundary dispute ==
The boundary at Sarchu was disputed between the states of Himachal Pradesh and Jammu and Kashmir. There is a pillar on the boundary, and records state that the boundary follows a drainage divide, but operators of seasonal tent accommodations cross the border to get favorable sites.

In 2019, after this part of Jammu and Kashmir was reorganized into the union territory of Ladakh, there was renewed interest in having the Survey of India mark the border.

== Weather ==
During winters, the temperature may drop to −20 °C (−4 °F) or less depending upon the month while in summers the temperate varies from 5 to 15 °C (41 to 59 °F) during the day but may fall below 0 °C (32 °F) at night. Staying in Sarchu has its own set of difficulties. AMS or acute mountain sickness is among the fundamental difficulties. Travelers normally stop at Kyelang or Jispa before heading out to Sarchu to acclimatize themselves. The chances of mountain sickness are uneven and depend on person to person and their present health conditions, although the possibility of getting hit by AMS cannot be ruled out completely.
