= Koksar =

- Village
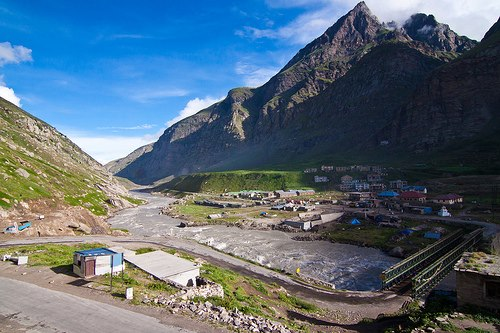
- Koksar village

- Location in Himachal Pradesh, India Koksar (India)
- Coordinates: 32.414°N 77.235°E
- Country: India
- State: Himachal Pradesh
- District: Lahaul and Spiti

Languages
  - Official: Hindi and the indigenous languages of the Ladakhi peoples of Indo-Aryan and Tibetan descent.
- Time zone: UTC+5:30 (IST)
- Vehicle registration: HP-
- Climate: Dfc

Koksar is one of the villages in Lahaul Mandal in Lahaulspiti District in Himachal Pradesh state in Northern India. Koksar meaning is Alpine, Big, Colossal, Gigantic, Highland, Huge, Mammoth, Tall and Towering. Koksar is about 19 km from Rohtang Pass, and 7 km from North Portal of Atal Tunnel Rohtang. Koksar is the coldest place in Lahaul. It is mostly snowed-in during winters but during the summer months, the PWD Rest House and Eating places are in business. It is a mountainous area from which views and pathways for hiking can be seen. It is 340 km from its state capital Shimla and 70 km from Manali.

Nearby villages are Tailing (7.0 km) and Sissu (13.0 km).
Koksar Pin Code is 175140 and the Post office name is Koksar. STD code of Koksar is +91-1900. Reliance Jio has started its 4G services in the valley starting 2019. Earlier BSNL Mobile Network was the only working network in the valley. Nearest petrol pump is at Tandi (40 km from Koksar) which is a sole filling station in the entire valley.

== Flora and fauna ==
The harsh conditions of Lahaul permit only scattered tufts of hardy grasses and shrubs to grow, even below 4,000 metres. Glacier lines are usually found at 5,000 metres.

Animals such as Yaks and dzos roam across the wild Lingti plains. However, over-hunting and a decrease in food supplies has led to a large decrease in the population of the Tibetan Antelope, Argali, Kiangs, Musk deer, and Snow leopards in these regions, reducing them to the status of endangered species. However, in the Lahaul valley, one can see Ibex, brown bears, foxes and Snow leopards during winter.

== People ==
The language, culture, and populations of Koksar are closely related. Generally the Lahaulis are of Tibetan and Indo-Aryan descent. Fairer skin and hazel-colored eyes are commonly seen among the Lahaulis.

The languages belong to the Tibetan family. They are very similar to the Ladakhi and Tibetans culturally, as they had been placed under the rule of the Guge and Ladakh kingdoms at occasional intervals.

The family acts as the basic unit of kinship. The extended family system is common, evolved from the polyandric system of the past. The family is headed by a senior male member, known as the Yunda, while his wife, known as the Yundamo, attains authority by being the oldest member in the generation. The clan system, also known as Rhus, plays another major role in the Koksar society.

Old ladies from Koksar

== Lifestyle ==
The lifestyles of the Koksar is owing to their proximity. Agriculture is the main source of livelihood. Potato and peas farming is common. Other occupations include working in government programs, government services, private services outside of the village and other businesses and crafts. Earlier houses were made of mud and stones but these days houses are constructed in modern style with bricks and cement.

== Religion ==
Most of the residents of Koksar follow a combination of Hinduism and Tibetan Buddhism of the Drukpa Kagyu order.

Exterior view of Koksar Gompa.

koksar meaning is Alpine, Big, Colossal, Gigantic, Highland, Huge, Mammoth, Tall and Towering.

== Infrastructure ==
There is 1 HPPWD Rest House, 2 Primary School, 1 Ayurvedic Health Centre, 1 Military Health Centre and 1 Veterinary Health Centre facilities available. Border Roads Organisation and Military camp is also here.

== Transport ==
Kaksar will be a station on the under-construction Bhanupli–Leh line. It lies on the NH-3.

== Tourism ==
Koksar village is situated at Leh–Manali Highway. Seasonally, at Koksar Bazar for Tourist information and help, to enter vehicles a police checkpost is established and also for registering of foreigners' passports.

As in the past years many tourists have been visiting Koksar and prefer spending time here as the village is the first village after entering Lahaul and one can experience and witness the drastic change in the flora, fauna and the landscapes after crossing rohtang.

The village also has a monastery which attracts a good number of tourists because of its religious importance and the location of the monastery which is bedded inside the mountain and is one of its kind in the valley.

Koksar also has importance from a tourists' perspective as it is not only the first and the nearest Lahauli village from Rohtang (just 19 km) but also the nearest Lahauli village from Chandra Taal (lake of the moon).
