= Lungalacha La =

Mountain pass in Ladakh

Lachulung La
- Location within Ladakh
- Elevation: 5,059 m (16,598 ft)
- Traversed by: Leh–Manali Highway

Location
- Location: Ladakh, India
- Coordinates: 33°06′N 77°38′E

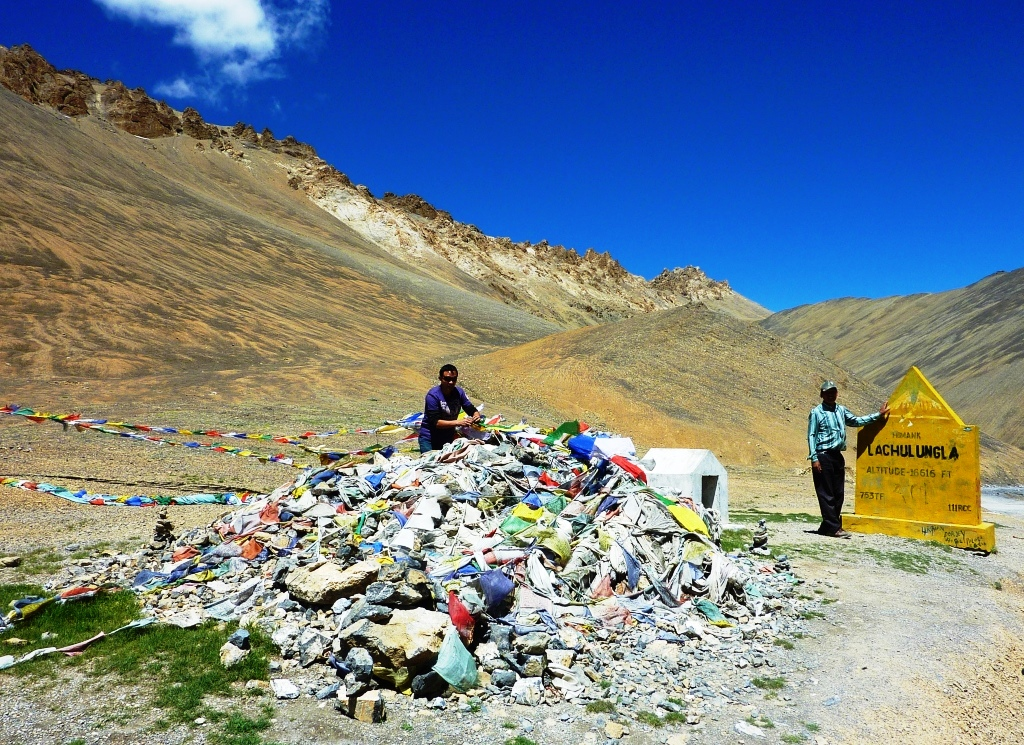
Lachulung La pass

Lachulung La (el. 5,059 m or 16,600 ft), or Lāchālūng La or Lungalacha La, is a paved motorable mountain pass in Ladakh in India just north of border with Himachal Pradesh. It is located on the NH3 Leh–Manali Highway, 54 km (34 mi) north of Sarchu and 24 km (15 mi) west of Pang.

== Transport ==
Lungalacha La Tunnel: Rail-cum-road tunnel is being constructed under this pass to cater for the traffic for existing NH3 & under-construction Bhanupli–Leh line, Bara-lacha la (84 km south of Lungalacha La) and Taglang La (87 km north of Lungalacha La) are other tunnels being constructed on this route. See also Tunnels in North West India.

== Tourism ==
Hiking: This is one of the easier 16,000 ft (4,880 m) passes and it can be traversed cross-country by moving along the nala on both sides. However, due to elevation, the hikers face breathlessness during climb and those who have not undergone acclimatisation may face severe symptoms of altitude sickness.

== See also ==
- Geography of Ladakh
- India-China Border Roads
- List of mountain passes of India
