= Taglang La =

Mountain pass in Ladakh

Tanglang La
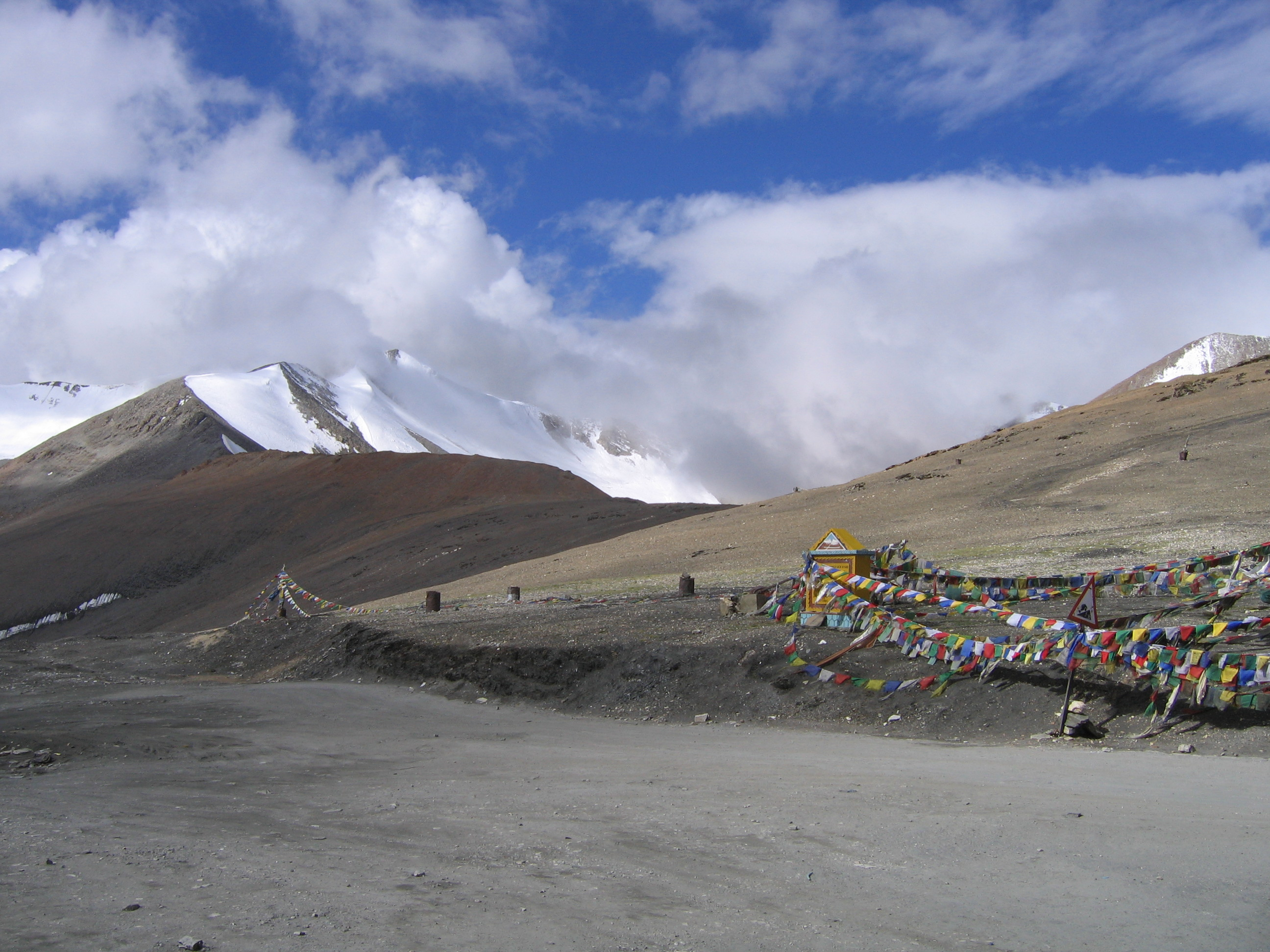
- Tanglang La on the Leh-Manali Highway

- Location within Ladakh Location within India
- Elevation: 5,328 m (17,480 ft)
- Traversed by: Leh-Manali Highway

Third Approach
- Location: India
- Range: Himalaya
- Coordinates: 33°30′28″N 77°46′12″E

Taglang La or Tanglang La, elevation 5,328 metres (17,480 ft), is a high altitude mountain pass in Leh district in the Indian union territory of Ladakh. It is located on the NH3 Leh–Manali Highway. Rail-cum-road tunnels are being constructed under the Taglang La, Lungalacha La (87 km south of Taglang La) and Bara-lacha la (171 km south of Taglang La) to cater for the traffic from existing NH3 & under-construction Bhanupli–Leh line (see also Tunnels in North West India). Once railway line is completed, the elevation in metres according to the SRTM data will make it the World's Highest Railway Station at 5,256.25 metres (17,245 ft), overtaking Tangulla railway station currently at 5,068 metres (16,627 ft) at in Tibet Autonomous Region of China

The elevation in metres on the local signboard is in agreement with SRTM data, however the claim of being world's second highest motorable pass is no longer accurate after construction of several other higher motorable passes and it was the 12th highest motorable pass in 2015.

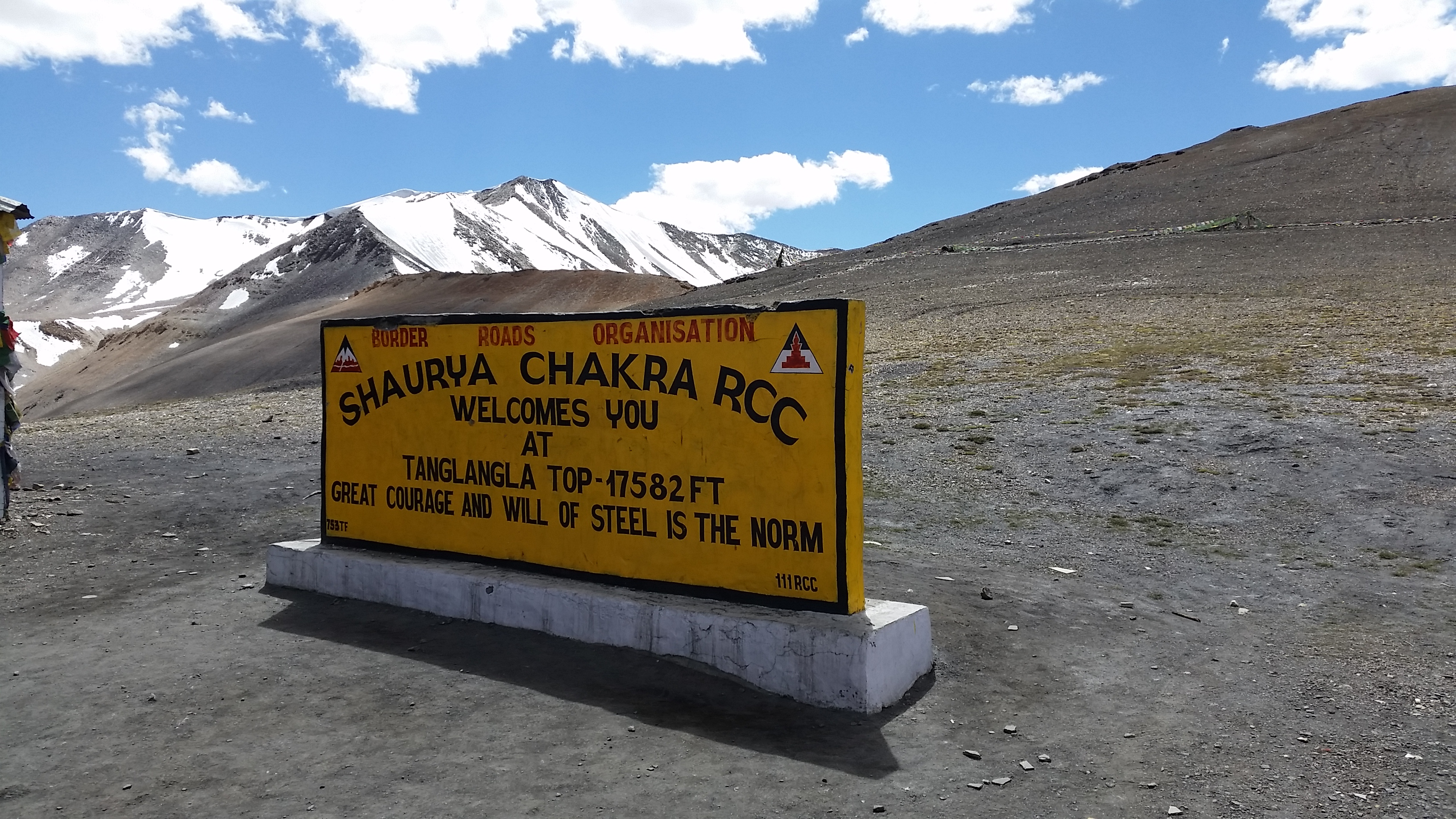
Tanglang La

== See also ==
- Geography of Ladakh
- India-China Border Roads
- List of mountain passes of India

== Notes ==
Media related to Taglang La at Wikimedia Commons
