= Leh–Manali Highway =

High elevation mountain highway in India

Coordinates: 32.2495793°N 77.1905049°E

Leh-Manali Highway
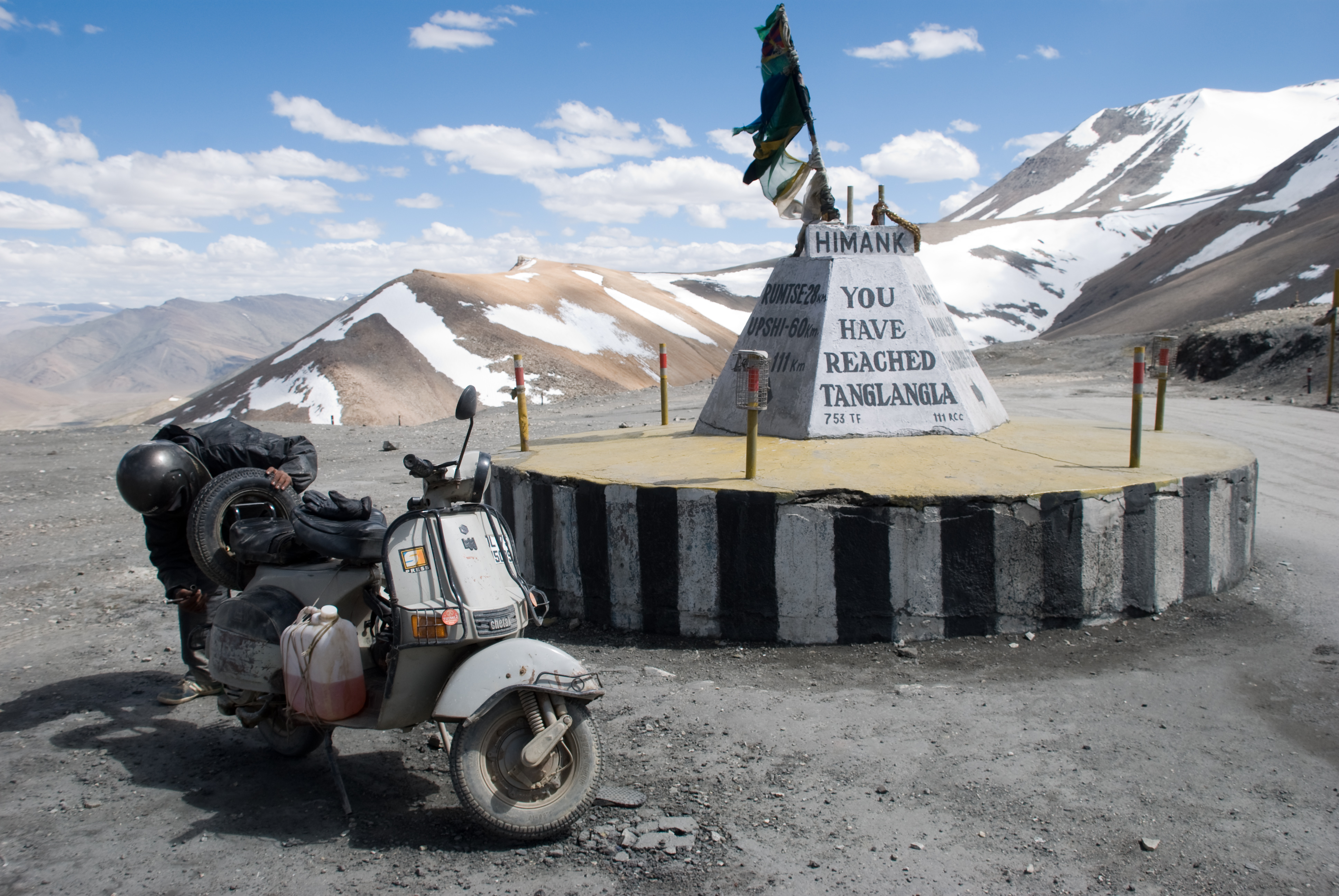
- Taglang La pass, Elevation: 5359 m (17,582 ft)

Route information
- Length: 428 km (266 mi)

Major junctions
- North end: Leh, Ladakh
- South end: Manali, Himachal Pradesh

Location
- Country: India
- States: Himachal Pradesh, Ladakh
- Primary destinations: Leh; Shey; Karu; Upshi; Gya; Sarchu (state border); Zingzingbar; Patseo; Darcha; Jispa; Keylong; Tandi; Sissu; Koksar; Gramphu; Rohtang; Manali

Highway system
- Roads in India; Expressways; National; State; Asian

The Leh–Manali Highway is a 428 km (266 mi) long highway in northernmost India connecting Leh, the capital of the Union Territory of Ladakh, to Manali in the state of Himachal Pradesh, and forms part of NH3. It crosses four passes: Rohtang La, Baralacha La, Lungalacha Ka, Tanglang La. It connects the Kullu Valley of the upper Beas river to the Chandra and Bhaga river valleys of Lahaul via the Atal tunnel in Himachal Pradesh, then crosses over a series of high Himalayan passes into the Indus river valley in Ladakh. It is usually open for about six months a year from the first week of May when the snow is cleared from the highway to October when snowfall again blocks the high passes on the highway. Before the construction of the Atal tunnel, the highway used to remain closed beyond the Rohtang Pass during winter. With the completion of the proposed Shingo La Tunnel on an alternate route through Zanskar valley, targeted to be completed by 2025, the whole Leh-Manali route will become an all-weather road.

The Leh–Manali Highway acts as a trunk route for various India-China Border Roads in Ladakh and Himachal Pradesh. It has been designed, built, and maintained by the Border Roads Organisation (BRO) of the Indian army. It supports the heaviest army vehicles.

== History ==
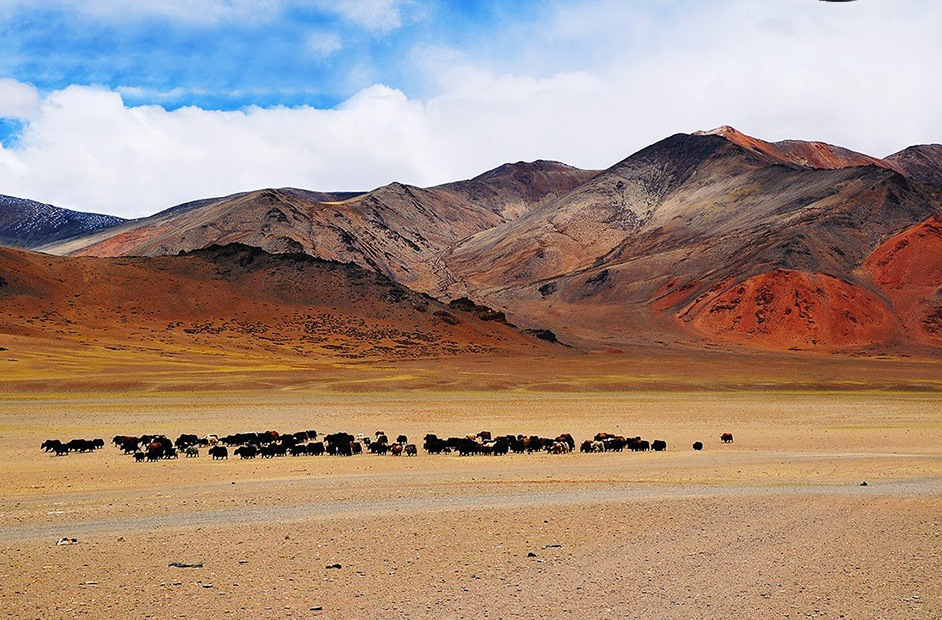
Yaks in More plains.

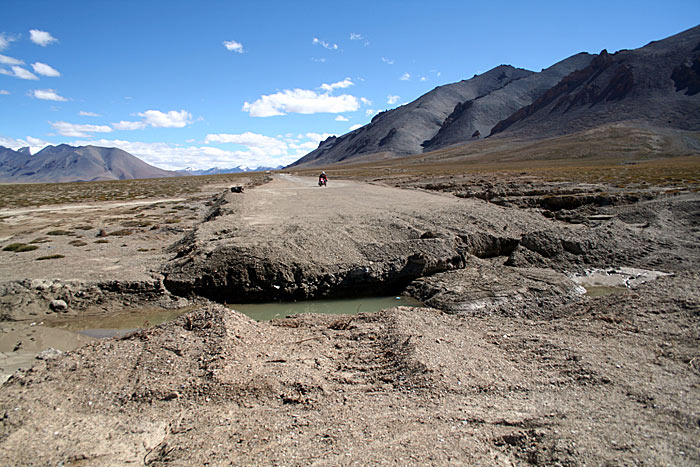
Fast-flowing water eroded the highway on the More plains.

=== Construction ===
The work on the Leh-Manali road was started in 1964 and its construction was taken up from both ends. In 1989, the 473-km Manali-Leh road began serving as the second land approach to Ladakh.

=== Earlier Route ===
In Himachal Pradesh:

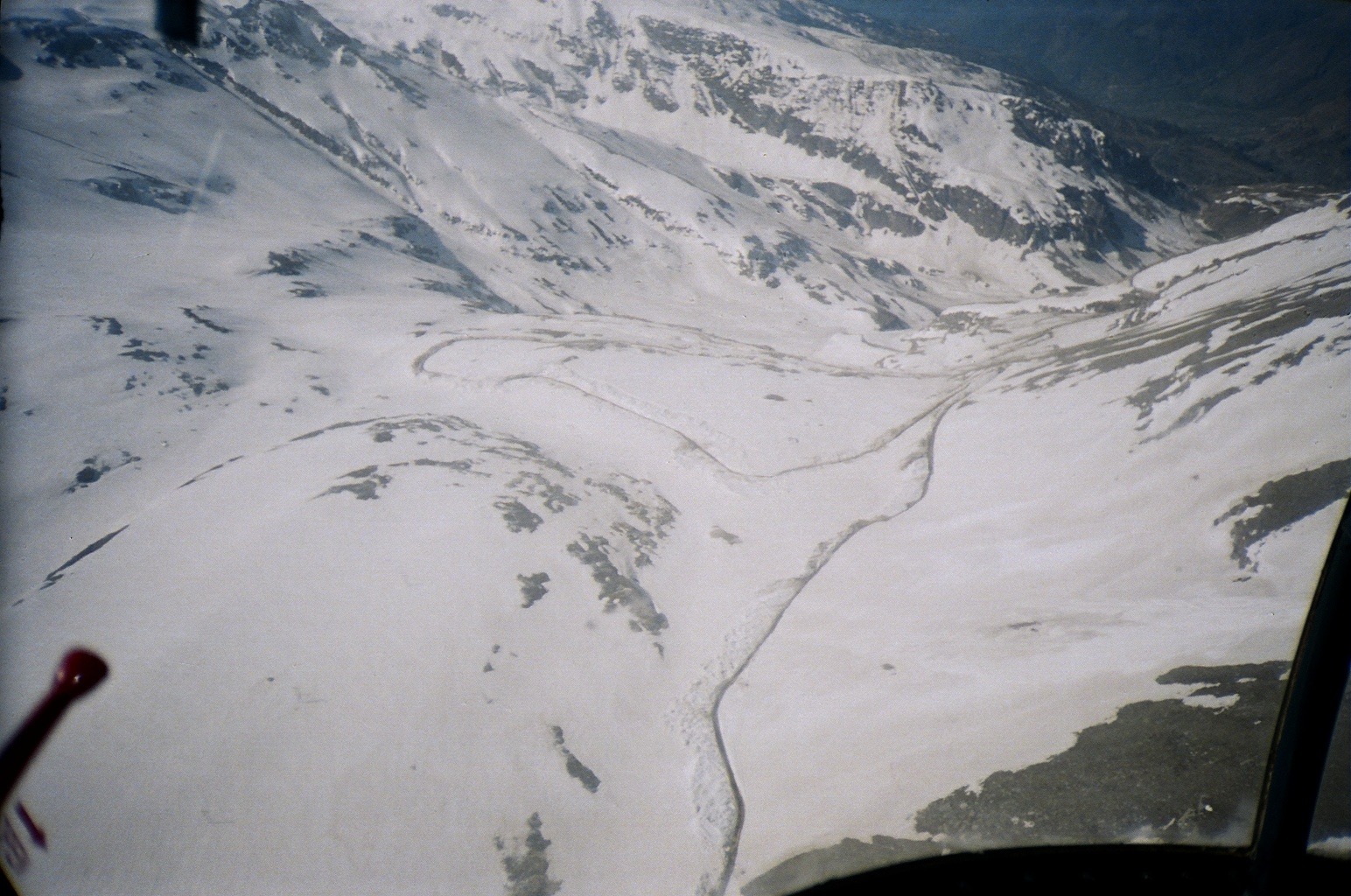
The Rohtang Pass becomes impassable during winter.

- 1: Manali (altitude 1,950 m (6,400 ft)) to Marhi at 3,300 m (10,800 ft) elevation 33 km (21 mi). It is a steady climb.
- 2: Marhi to Rohtang Pass at 3,980 m (13,060 ft) elevation 18 km (11 mi). It is a steady climb.
- 3: Rohtang to Gramphu at 3,200 m (10,500 ft) elevation 15 km (9.3 mi). It is a steady descent. The right turn (towards east) at Gramphu leads to Spiti valley, Batal, Kunzum La and Kaza on a road along Chandra river that is unpaved until Kunzum Pass and beyond.
- 4: Gramphu to Koksar, the first village north of Rohtang Pass 5 km (3.1 mi). Foreign nationals have to show their passports with a valid visas at the police check post here.
- 5: Koksar to Sissu at 3,130 m (10,270 ft) elevation 15 km (9.3 mi). The highway runs along the left (south) bank of the Chandra River, with a beautiful waterfall on the other side of the river.

After this, there is the main route from Sissu as mentioned above.

== Geography ==
The average elevation of the Leh-Manali highway is more than 4,000 m (13,000 feet) and its highest elevation is 5,328 m (17,480 ft) at the Taglang La mountain pass. It is flanked by mountain ranges on both sides, featuring stunning sand and natural rock formations. The landscape changes after getting past the Atal tunnel and the greenery starts receding upon entering the Chandra river valley in the Lahaul region that lies in the rain-shadow. After crossing Darcha, the greenery completely disappears and the mountain slopes on the leeward side become brown and arid. Most of the mountain peaks and highway Pass north of Darcha remain covered by snow even in summer and shine brightly in the sun. Adjacent glaciers melt (more so as the day wears on) and water overruns the highway in many places. This water is ice-cold and travelers should avoid situations where they might have to wade through it.

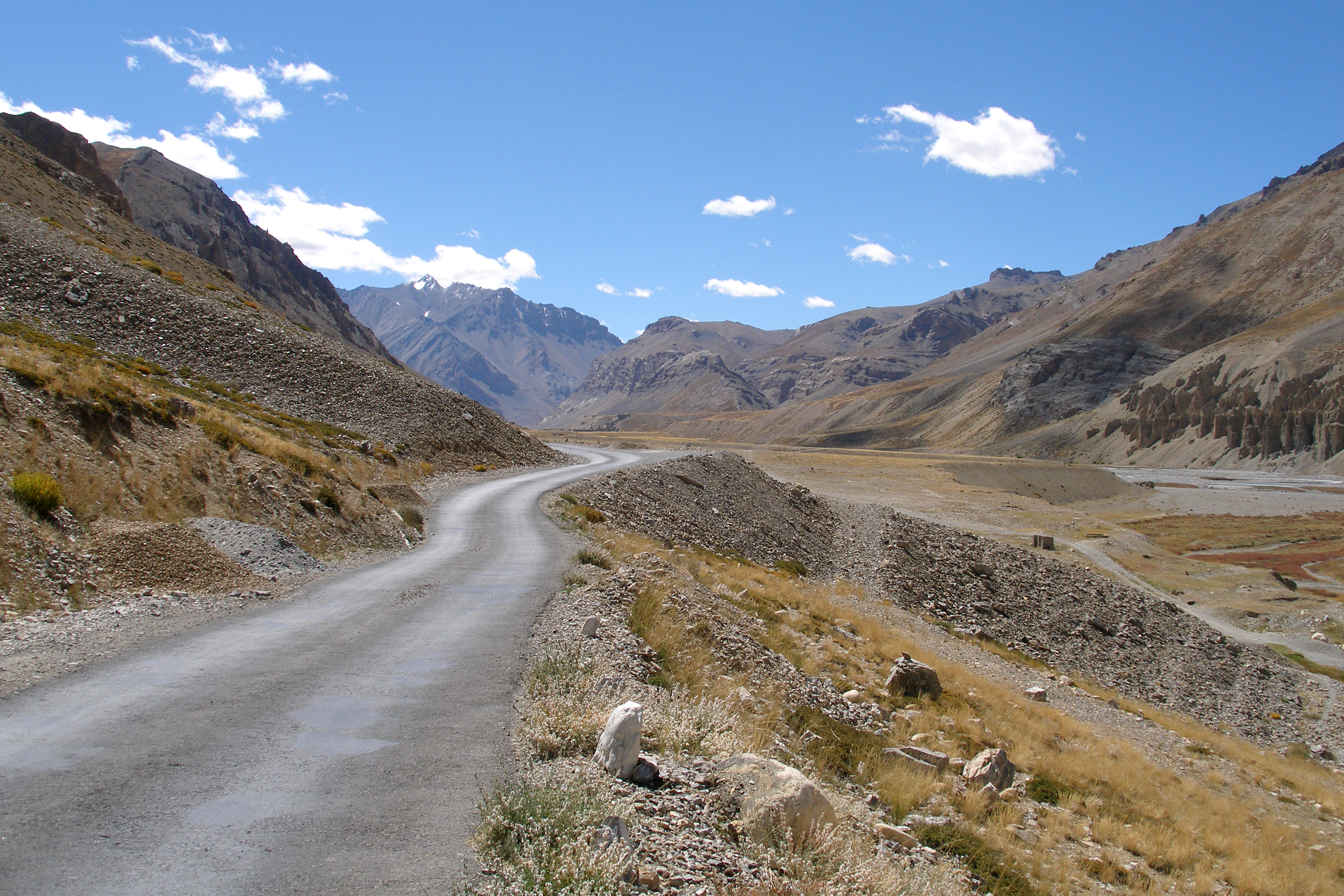
The road between Leh-Manali in Ladakh.

== Climate ==
Ladakh is a cold semi-arid desert. It is cold along the highway even in summer (May onwards); the days are warm in bright sunshine but the nights are very cold. Light woolens are required during the day and thick woolens are required at night. There is scanty rainfall between Darcha and Leh even during the monsoon season in July–September as the entire region lies in the rain shadow.

== Current route ==
The total length of the highway is about 428 km (266 mi). It has 177 km (110 mi) in Himachal Pradesh as the length in Himachal Pradesh is shortened by about 45 km (28 mi) after the opening of the Atal Tunnel avoiding the Rohtang Pass, and 251 km (156 mi) in Ladakh. The state line is at Sarchu. The Leh-Manali highway is generally two lanes wide (one lane in each direction) without a road divider but has only one or one and a half lanes at some stretches. Snow and rain can make the highway slushy or too slippery to travel. It has over a dozen Bailey bridges and all of them are now being upgraded to two-lane steel bridges. The highway crosses many streams of ice-cold water from snow-capped mountains and glacial melts without a bridge and it requires driving skill to negotiate fast-flowing streams.

Route of Leh–Manali Highway
Location	State	Altitude	Distance	Remarks
Manali	Himachal Pradesh	1,950 metres (6,400 ft)	0 kilometres (0 mi)	It is the starting point of route.
Sissu	Himachal Pradesh	3,130 m (10,270 ft)	41 km (25 mi)	The route from Manali to Sissu runs via Palchan-Solang Valley road, then through Atal Tunnel bypassing the Rohtang pass. Further, the distance from Manali to Gramphu via Atal Tunnel is only 47 km for Spiti valley bound travelers. There is a helipad at Sissu with service to Manali during the winter.
Tandi	Himachal Pradesh	2,570 m (8,430 ft)	22 km (14 mi)	Tandi is at the bottom of a river valley, where the Chandra River and the Bhaga River (flowing from the north) merge to form the Chandra-Bhaga river (which becomes the Chenab downstream in Jammu region). Cross the Bhaga river over the bridge towards the right, take the right turn at the fork, and the road again starts climbing.
Keylong	Himachal Pradesh	3,080 m (10,100 ft)	8 km (5.0 mi)	Keylong is District HQ of Lahaul and Spiti district.
Jispa	Himachal Pradesh	3,310 m (10,860 ft)	22 km (14 mi)	Jispa is a village where two nullahs (small streams) join the Bhaga River.
Darcha	Himachal Pradesh	3,360 m (11,020 ft)	6 km (3.7 mi)	All tourists have to register at the police check post here.
Zingzingbar	Himachal Pradesh	4,270 m (14,010 ft)	25 km (16 mi)	Zingzingbar is the South Portal for the proposed Baralacha La Tunnel. The steep ascent to Baralacha La starts at Zingzingbar.
Bara-lacha la	Himachal Pradesh	4,850 m (15,910 ft)	22 km (14 mi)	It is a steady climb. A stream (from a glacial melt) flows across the highway just before Zingzingbar. It is advisable to cross the stream before noon because the flow of ice-cold water increases as the temperature rises. If the flow of water is too powerful for a vehicle to cross, or if the weather worsens en route to Baralacha La, turn back to Zingzingbar or Darcha, and seek accommodation before trying on the next day. The 130 km drive from Zingzingbar to Pang is the toughest part of the journey on the highway and a nightmare at times. During the best of the season, without any blockades and traffic jams, it can take up to 5-6 hrs to cover this stretch with at least one halt en route. Almost 35 kms of stretch on either side of Sarchu has been double laned and is in good condition now.
Killing Sarai	Himachal Pradesh		13 km (8.1 mi)	It is a steady descent. Killing Sarai is the North Portal for the proposed Baralacha La tunnel. The Bhaga river and the Chandra river originate from melting snow at opposite sides of Baralacha La, the former flowing southwest and the latter flowing first southeast and then northwest to merge at Tandi.
Sarchu	Himachal Pradesh	4,200 m (13,800 ft)	20 km (12 mi)	Sarchu is a military base and has a police check post. It is the border between Himachal Pradesh and Ladakh. Register at the police check post here.
Pang	Ladakh	4,650 m (15,260 ft)	76 km (47 mi)	It involves climbing 500 m through the Gata loops (21 hairpin bends) at 4,190 m (13,750 ft) elevation and traversing through Nakee La at 4,739 m (15,547 ft) and Lachulung La at 5,065 m (16,616 ft) elevations.
Tanglang La	Ladakh	5,328 m (17,480 ft)	66 km (41 mi)	This stretch crosses a plateau at 4,700 m (15,400 ft) called the More plains or Morey plains. A flat stretch of 40 km on Morey plain is a driving paradise at such elevation and comes as a huge relief for motorists. The 175 km long road from Pang to Leh via Morey plains and Taglang La, is in excellent condition and generally takes less than 5 hours to cover. Visiting some locations beyond Leh requires special permission, which can be obtained at Leh.
Upshi	Ladakh		61 km (38 mi)	The highway crosses the Indus river to reach Upshi village on the north.
Karu	Ladakh		14 km (8.7 mi)	After crossing the Indus river at Upshi, the highway bears left for Karu. The right turn is an ancient trading road heading east toward Pangong Lake and Tibet. There is a helipad on this road.
Leh	Ladakh	3,500 m (11,500 ft)	34 km (21 mi)	Staying to the left and following the Indus River leads toward Leh. There is another turn-off to the right that goes to Shyok, Pangong Lake, and Tibet.

=== Tunnels ===
Shinku La Tunnel technically is not part of Leh-anli Highway but it provides alternate access between Leh and Manali. Tunnels are listed from north to south:

Strategic Tunnels (Manali–Leh and NPD Axis)
Tunnel Name	Road Axis	Pass Bypassed	Length	Status (citation)	Expected Completion
Taglang La Tunnel	NH 3	Taglang La	7.32 km	Planning / DPR stage	TBD
Lachung La Tunnel	NH 3	Lachung La	14.7 km	Planning / DPR stage	TBD
Nakee La Tunnel	NH 3	Nakee La	TBD	Planning / DPR stage	TBD
Baralacha La Tunnel	NH 3	Baralacha La	13.7 km	Planning / DPR stage	TBD
Shinku La Tunnel	NPD Road	Shinku La	4.1 km	Under Construction (technically part of Nimmu–Padum–Darcha road)	August 2028
Atal Tunnel	NH 3 / NPD	Rohtang Pass	9.02 km	Operational	October 2020

== Tourism ==
=== Transport ===
Buses start from Manali at 4 am until 6 pm. The peak travel season is during May–June and September–October when tourists visit Atal tunnel, Rohtang pass, and Lahaul valley. Most of the domestic tourists return to Manali on the same day. Himachal Road Transport Corporation (HRTC) and Himachal Pradesh Tourism Development Corporation (HPTDC) operate buses that travel the entire highway in two days. The travel time from Manali to Keylong is now approximately 2 hours via the Atal tunnel. Private four-wheel drive taxis are available. Shared taxis are cheap as they charge per person, but they may be full of local residents. The tourist cannot stop either a bus or a shared taxi for sightseeing. Many bikers travel from Manali to Leh and other places in Ladakh on motorcycles, generally in a group.

After the opening of the Atal Tunnel, the journey from Manali to Leh normally requires one overnight stay en route (Overnight accommodations are described below). Travel time is unpredictable since the weather and road conditions can change suddenly. However, it is now possible to cover the entire journey from Manali to Leh in 14–16 hours in a single day, if there are no road blockades and traffic jams en route.

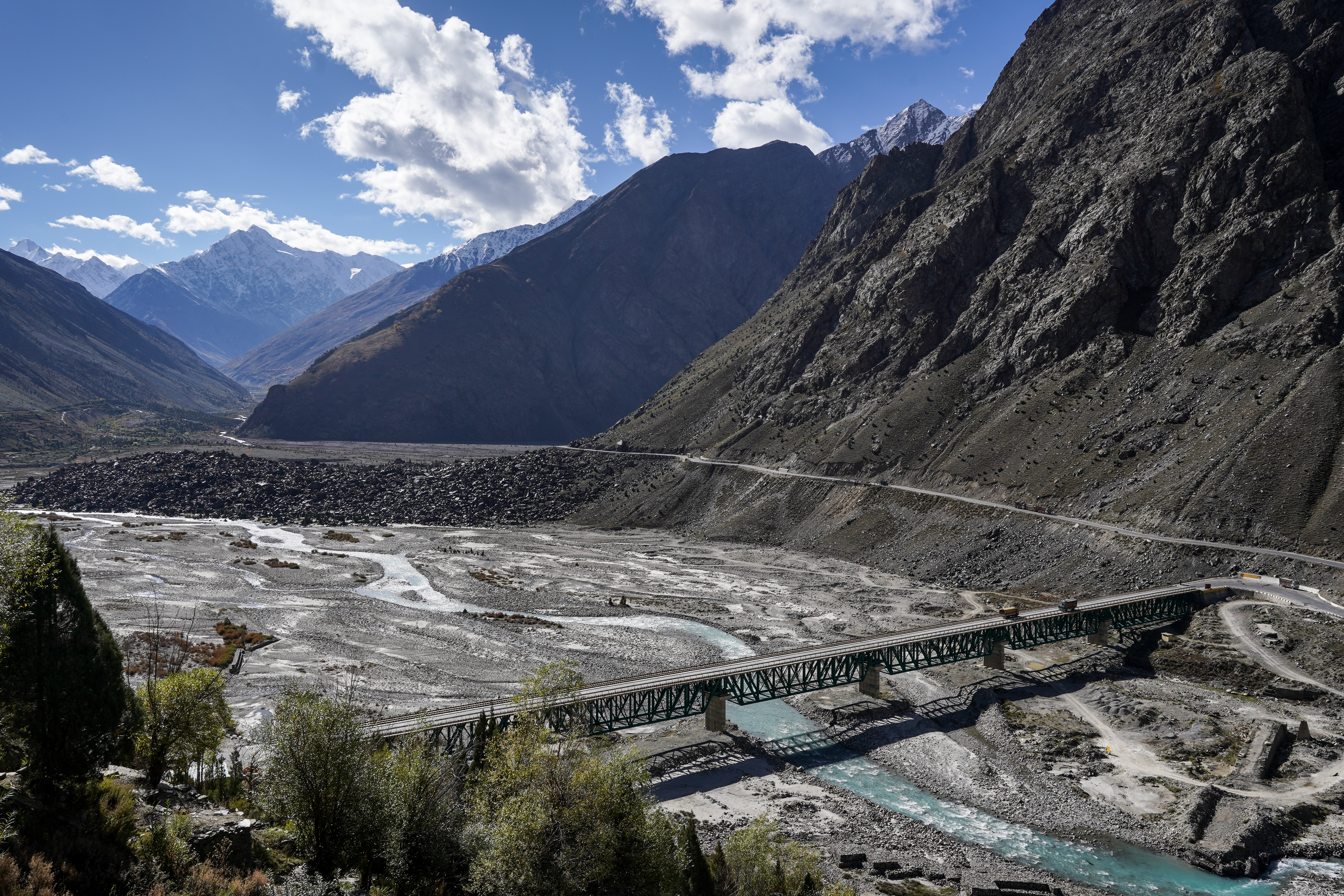
New Barsi Bridge, highway to Manali on right, Darcha, Lahaul.

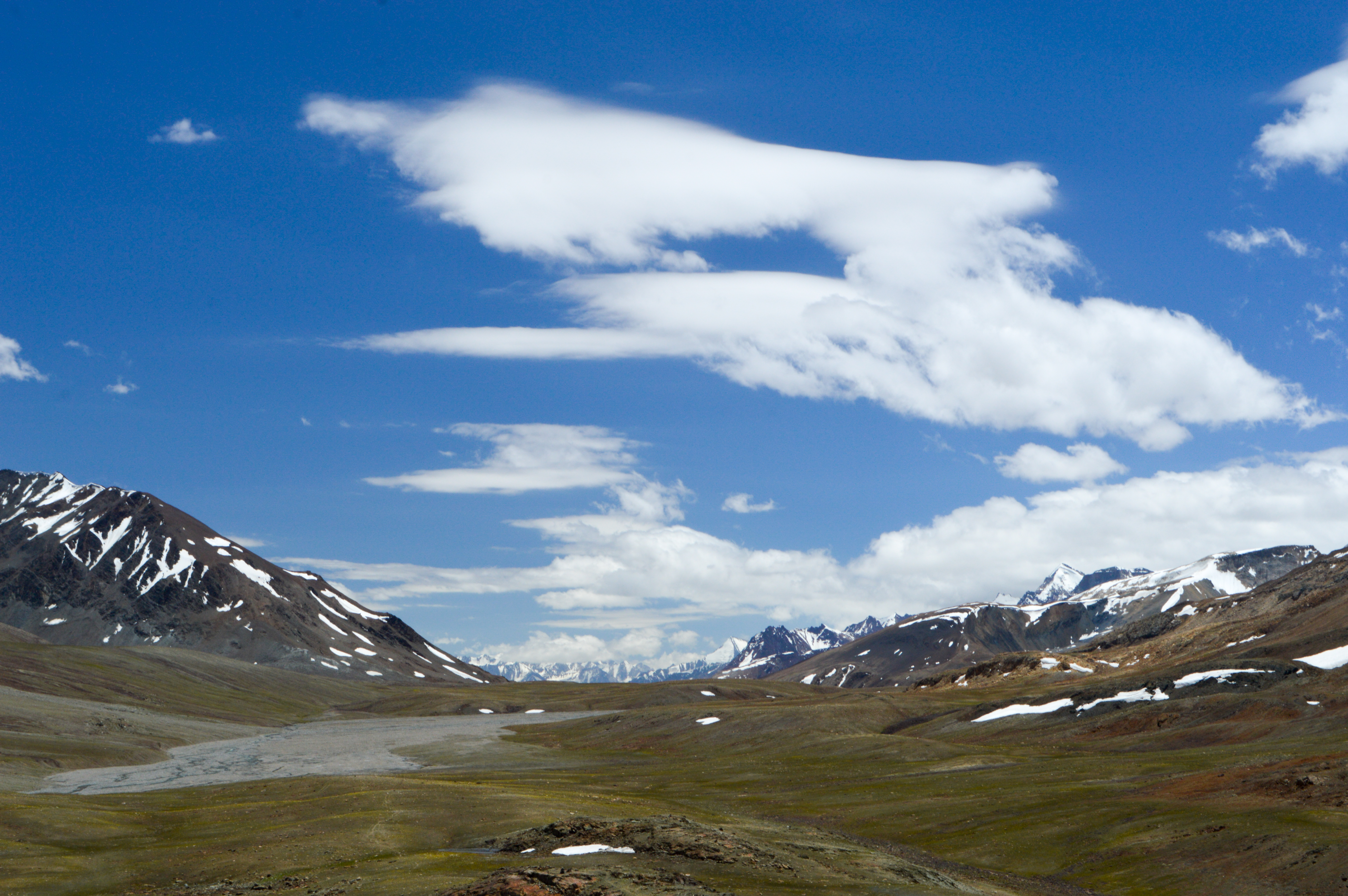
Baralacha La, 4,850 m (15,910 ft), Lahaul.

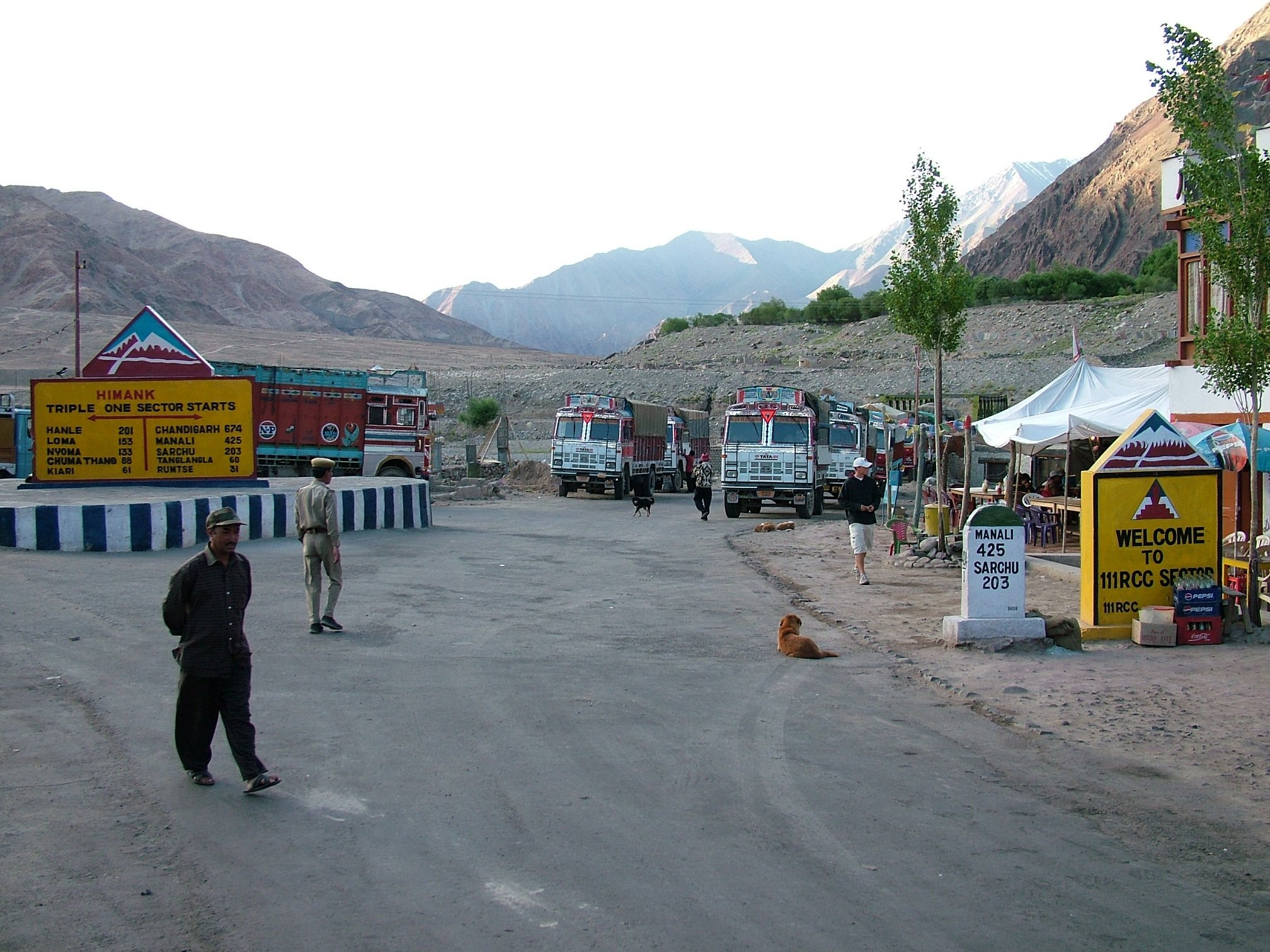
Upshi has a Customs and Excise taxation check post where vehicles are inspected.

=== Fuel stations ===
Earlier, there was no fuel station for 330 kilometres (210 mi) between Tandi and Karu. Now, a new fuel station at Keylong has become operational since September 2021. Motorists and bikers should fill up at the start of this stretch. Motorcycles and vehicles with small tanks should carry additional fuel in cans. In an emergency, fuel may be available at villages and campsites en route (Jispa, Zingzingbar, Sarchu, Pang, etc.), but this fuel may be adulterated and costly.

=== Altitude sickness ===
At high altitudes, the air is thin and contains less oxygen. Acute mountain sickness is possible, whose symptoms include headache, nausea, dizziness, and vomiting. It can be fatal. A traveler arriving by air from lower terrain should acclimate to the high altitude by staying at least one night at the starting point (say, Manali), and plan to stay over at either Keylong, Jispa or Darcha before ascending to the highway's highest passes and plains after Darcha. Travelers should minimize the time spent at high altitudes and therefore not stay over at Sarchu or Pang. They should carry chocolates, glucose, or other high-energy food on the journey.

=== Accommodation ===
There are a variety of hotels to suit all budgets at the highway's two ends - Manali and Leh. There are also hotels and PWD rest houses at Sissu and at Keylong (a district headquarter). There is one luxury hotel at Jispa.

The remaining option is to sleep in a tent which is generally basic and inexpensive. Luxury and comfortable tents (Swiss-cottage tents) are available in Jispa and Sarchu. Tent accommodations are also available in Darcha, Zingzingbar, Bharatpur (below Baralacha La pass, inhabited only during tourist season), and Pang. In India, a dhaba is a roadside eatery with low prices and no frills. These are found at some otherwise uninhabited places along the highway. A dhaba is not a motel but many dhabas let the customers lie down and rest, and some can provide an inexpensive dormitory bed (without a private toilet).

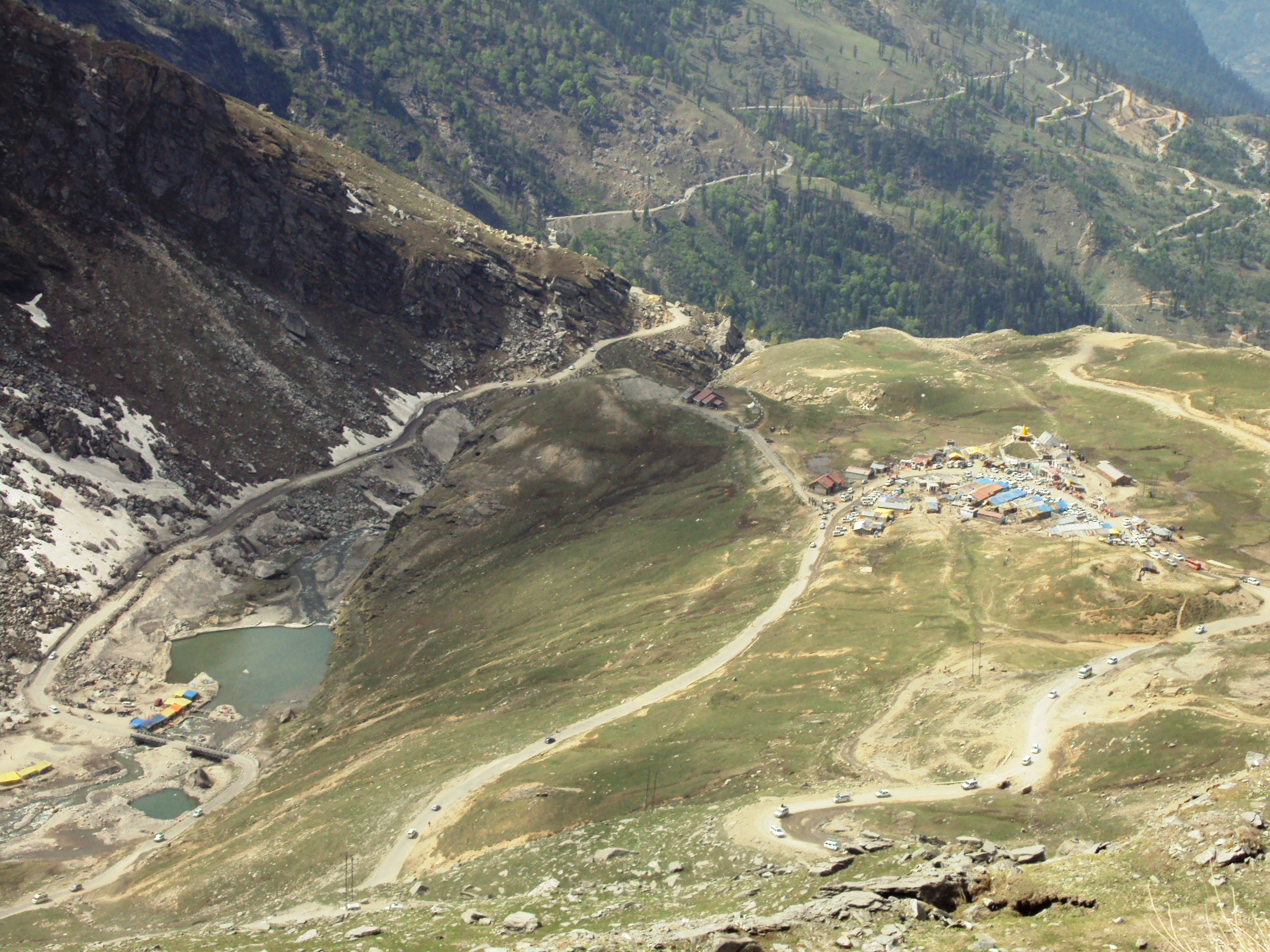
Dhabas (roadside eateries) near the Rohtang Pass.

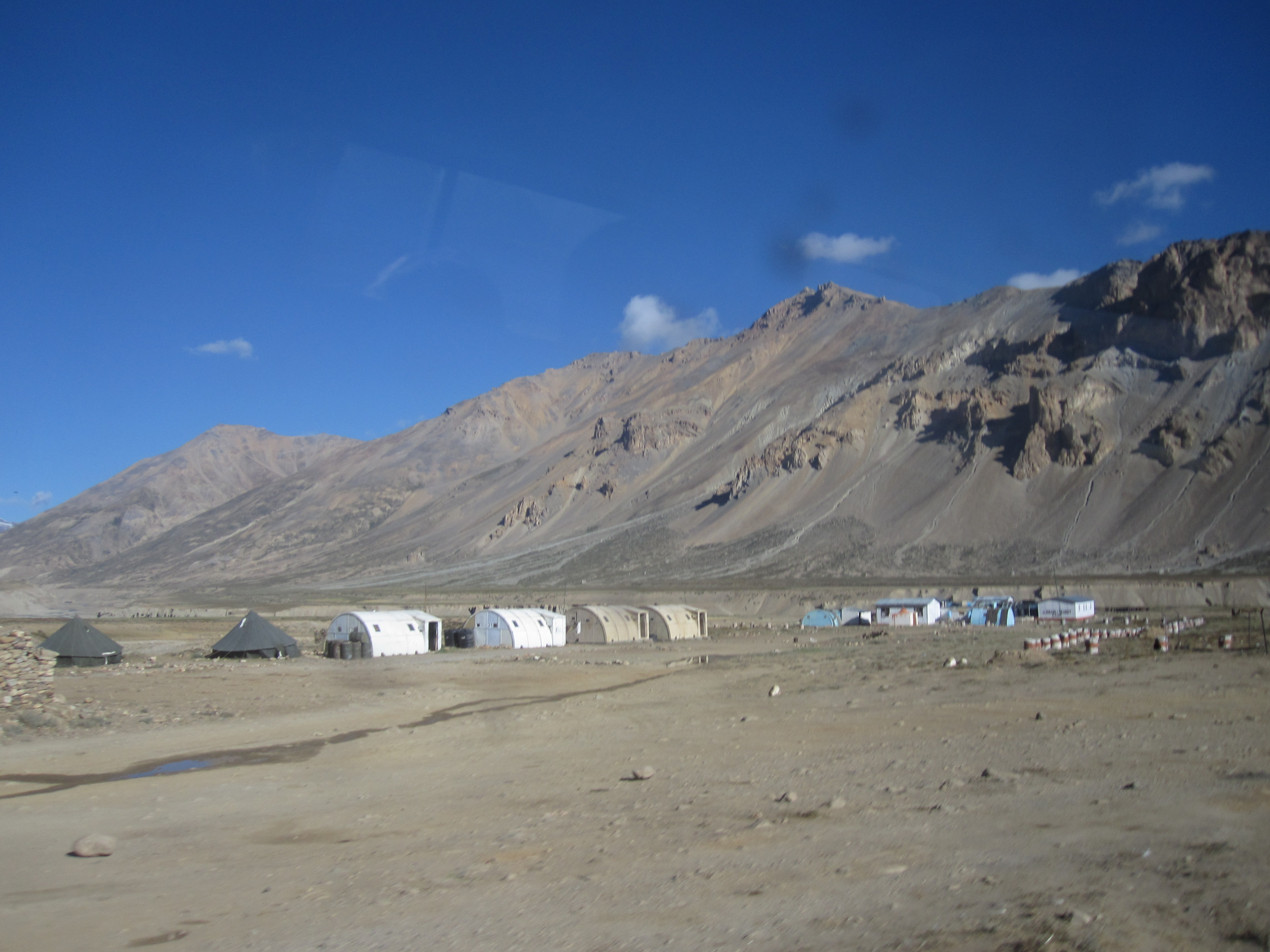
View of tents at Sarchu. Elsewhere, the guesthouses are available at Sissu, Keylong, Jispa, Rumtse, Upshi, and Karu.

== See also ==
- Various highways to Leh and Ladakh
- National Highway 3 (India)
- More plains
- Atal Tunnel
- Nimmu–Padam–Darcha road
- Bilaspur–Leh railway
