= Jispa =

- village
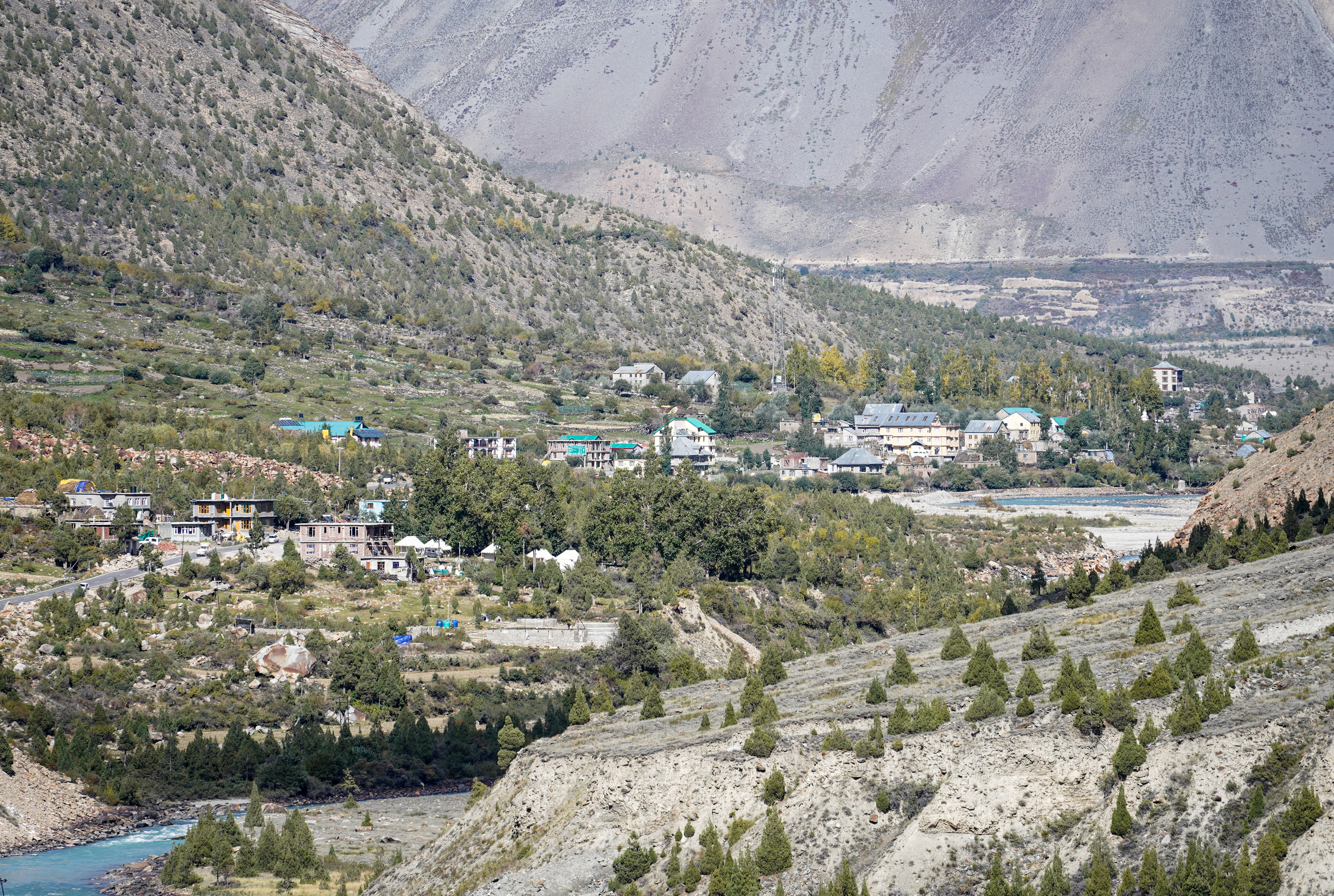

- Location in Himachal Pradesh, India Jispa (India)
- Coordinates: 32°38′0″N 77°10′0″E
- Country: India
- State: Himachal Pradesh
- District: Lahaul and Spiti

Area
  - Total: 0.49 km^{2} (0.19 sq mi)
- Elevation: 3,200 m (10,500 ft)

Population (2011)
  - Total: 202
  - Density: 410/km^{2} (1,100/sq mi)

Languages
  - Official: Hindi
- Time zone: UTC+5:30 (IST)
- Postal code: 175132
- Vehicle registration: HP
- Website: https://hplahaulspiti.nic.in/

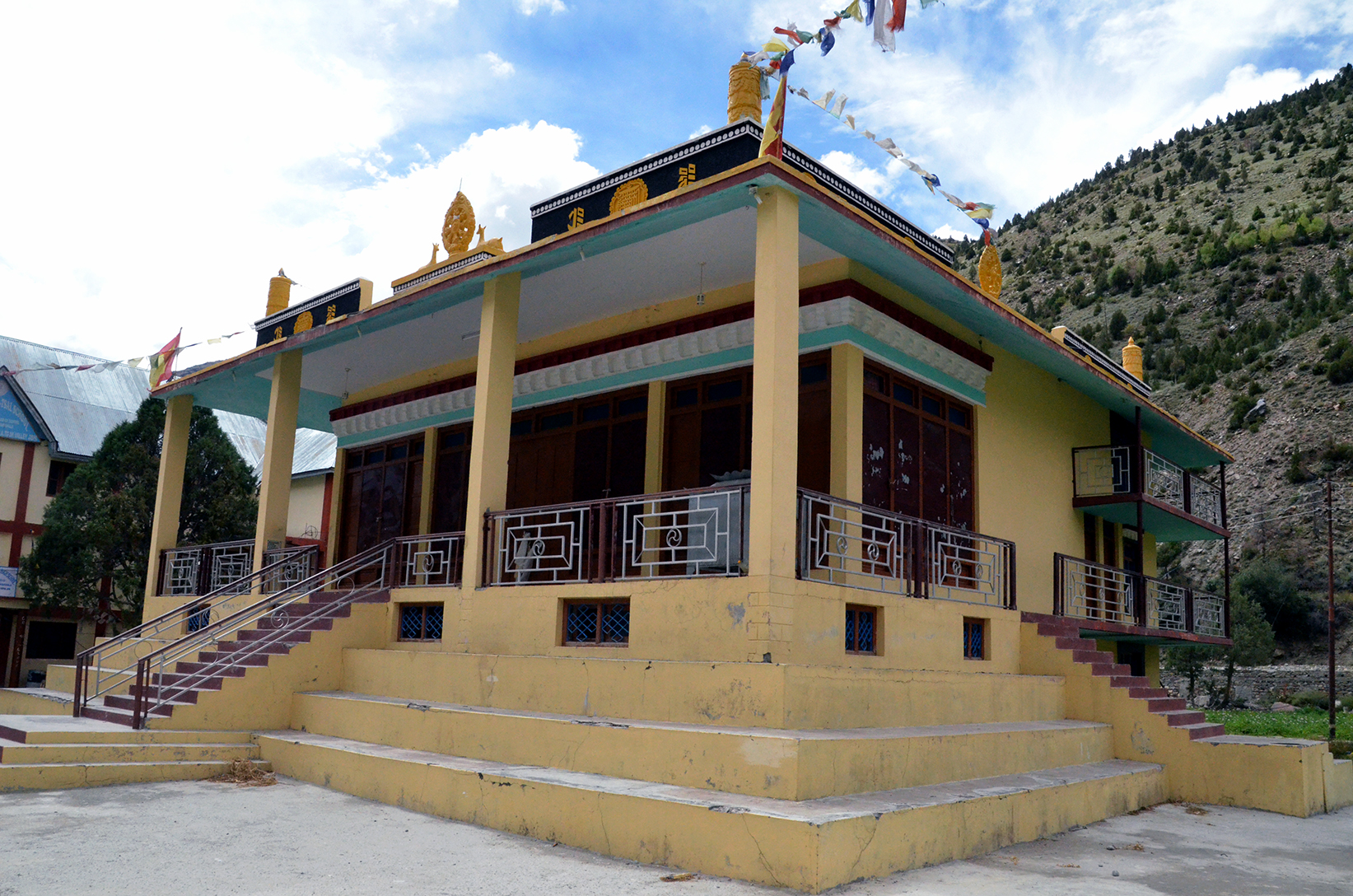
Jispa Monastery

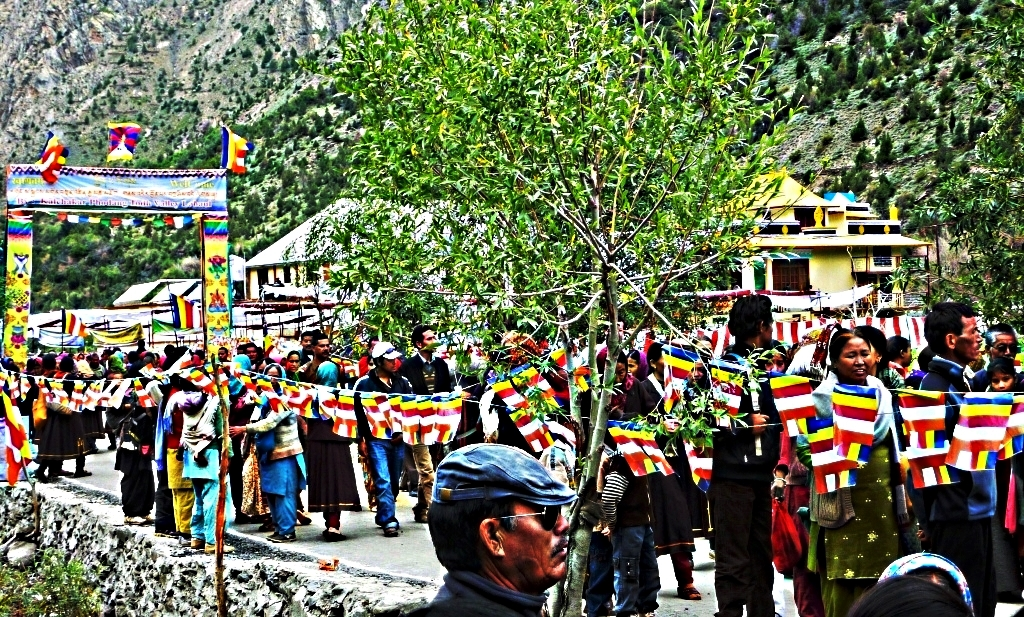
Pilgrims at Jispa for Dalai Lama's teachings. August 2010

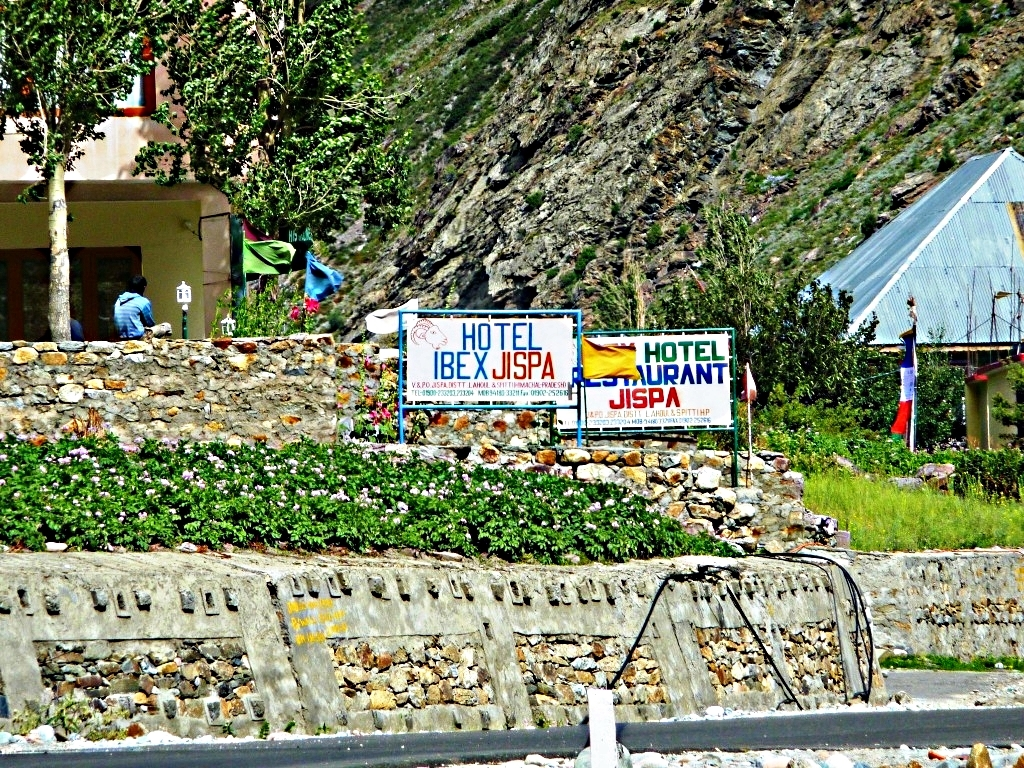
Jispa - hotel. 2010

Jispa (elevation 3,200 m or 10,500 ft; population 202) is a village in Lahaul, in the Indian state of Himachal Pradesh. It's located along the Manali–Leh Highway (NH‑3) on the banks of the Bhaga River, approximately 20 km north of Keylong and 7 km south of Darcha. It serves as a popular overnight stop for travelers en route to Lahaul‑Spiti or Ladakh.

Jispa experiences a cold, high-altitude climate with summer temperatures rising to around 15 °C and nighttime lows often near 3–5 °C. Heavy snowfall isolates the village from November to April.

The completion of the Atal Tunnel in 2020 has drastically reduced travel time between Manali and Jispa, making it a preferred overnight halt for travelers heading to Leh.

== Geography ==
Jispa is located 22 km (14 mi) north of Keylong and 7 km (4.3 mi) south of Darcha, along the Manali-Leh Highway and the Bhaga river. There are approximately 20 villages between Jispa and Keylong.

Regular buses operated by Himachal Road Transport Corporation (HRTC) ply between Manali, Keylong, and Jispa during the summer months (June–October). Shared taxis are also available from Manali. In winter, road access is restricted due to snow beyond Keylong.

== Demographics ==
According to the 2011 census, of the town's 202 residents, 113 were male and 89 were female. One belonged to scheduled castes, and 177 belonged to scheduled tribes. The village had 51 households. Though the official population remains small, local tourism and homestays have grown significantly post Atal Tunnel opening.

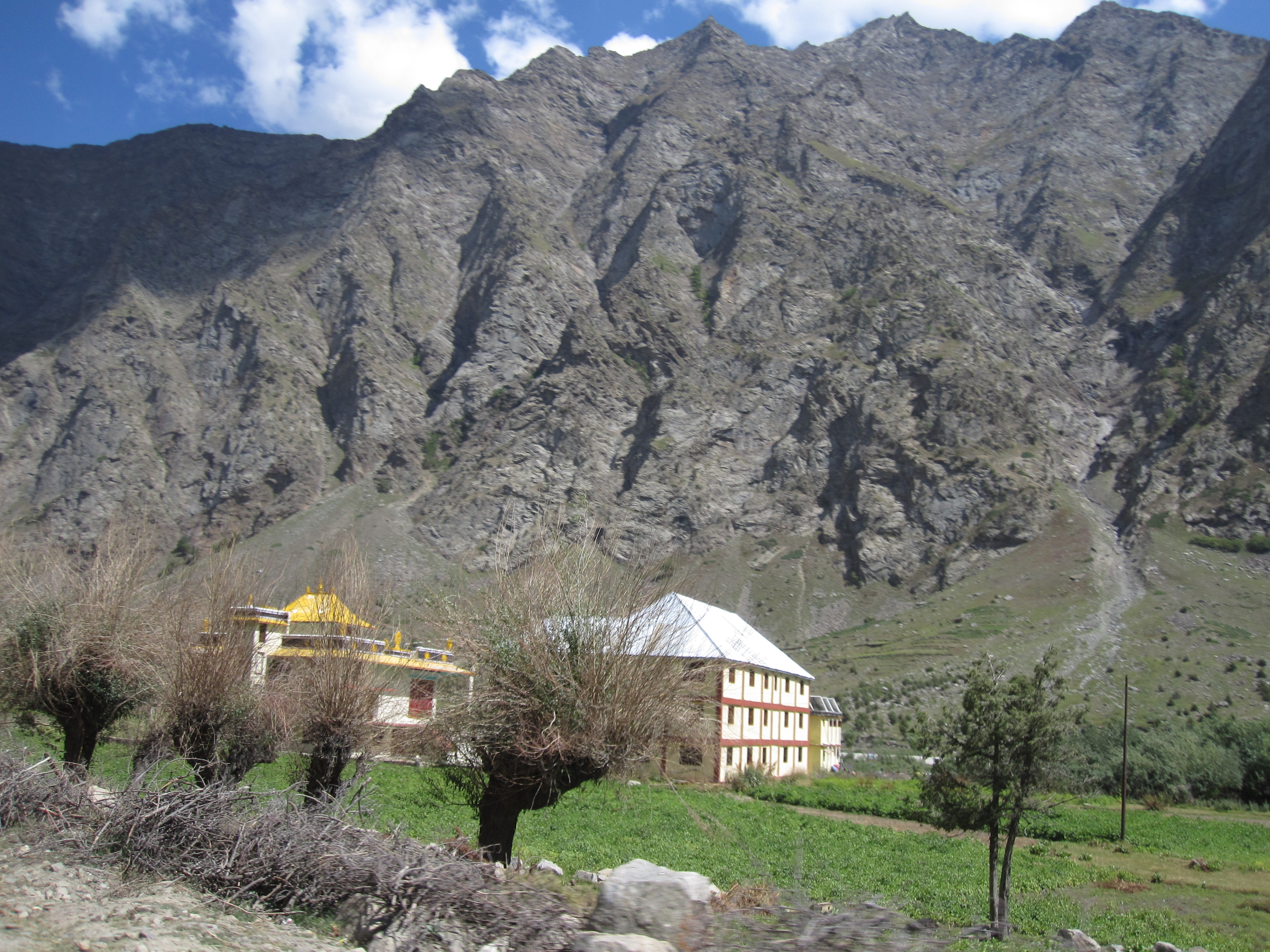
Houses in Jispa
