= Sissu =

- Town
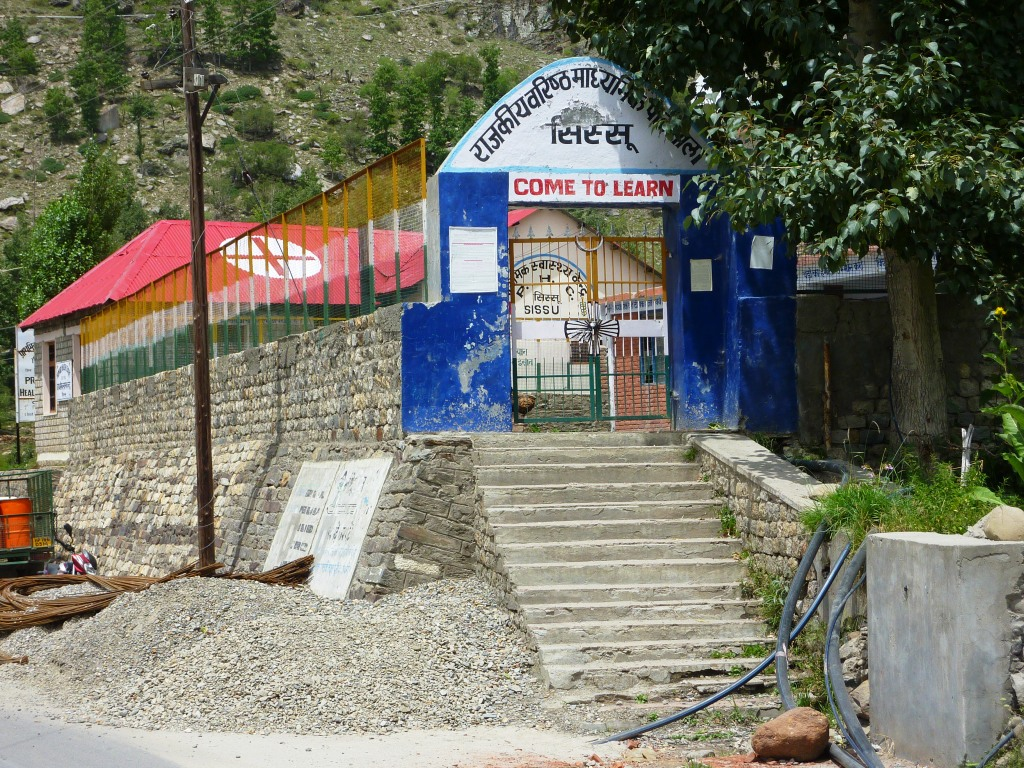
- Public Health Clinic, Sissu, Lahaul, India, 2010

- Location in Himachal Pradesh, India Sissu (India)
- Coordinates: 32°29′0″N 77°7′0″E
- Country: India
- State: Himachal Pradesh
- District: Lahaul and Spiti

Languages
  - Official: Hindi
- Time zone: UTC+5:30 (IST)
- Coastline: 0 kilometres (0 mi)

Sissu (also known as Khwaling) is a small town in the Lahaul valley of Himachal Pradesh in India. It is around 40 km from Manali and located on the right bank of Chandra river. It is located at 32°29′0″N 77°7′0″E. It is 3,120 m (10,235 ft) above sea level. It is 14 km (9 miles) from Koksar to the south-east and 11 km. (7 miles) west to Gondhla.

== Overview ==
It has a PWD Rest House, a High School and Primary Health Centre. There are a few 'chai shops' or tea stalls.

The view of the waterfall across the Chandra river and opposite the town, locally known as 'Palden Lhamo dhar', is particularly spectacular. The adjacent village of Shashin is home of the famous deity of Lahaul known as Ghepan/Ghepang or Lord Gyephang. The mountain Gyephang Goh (5,870 m; 19,258 ft), east of the town, is named after him. Sissu also has a Helipad and an adjacent Lake, which is a major tourist attraction.

Sissu is the main town centre for the nearby villages of Ropsang-Khangser-Gyungling, Gomathang, Yangling, Jagdang, Sarkhang, Shurthang and Labrang. Labrang village also has a Buddhist Gompa called Labrang Gompa dedicated to Palden Lhamo. As Sissu is located a few kilometres from the north portal of the Rohtang Tunnel, this area will stay connected throughout the year, allowing tourists to visit anytime. Hotels in Sissu include Hotel Triveni, Hotel Plm dhara, a few homestays and Goldrop Luxury Camps.

== Transport ==
=== Air ===
Bhuntar (IATA code KUU), the nearest airport is located in Bhuntar town, on NH3. From there, Sissu is approximately 80 km (50 mi) which can be covered via a 2.5 hour long drive through NH3 that passes via Atal Tunnel and leaves Rohtang at a distance of approximately 2.4 Km.

=== Rail ===
Sissu will have a railway station on the under-construction Bhanupli–Leh line.

=== Road ===
From Delhi, take NH1 up to Ambala, then NH 22 to Chandigarh, and then NH 21 to Bilaspur, Sundernagar, Mandi, and Kullu. The distance between Chandigarh and Manali by road is 310 km (193 mi), with a total distance of 570 km (354 mi) between Delhi and Manali. Sissu from Manali is approximately 40 km (25 mi) which takes around 1.5 hours via NH3 that passes through Atal tunnel.

== Gallery ==
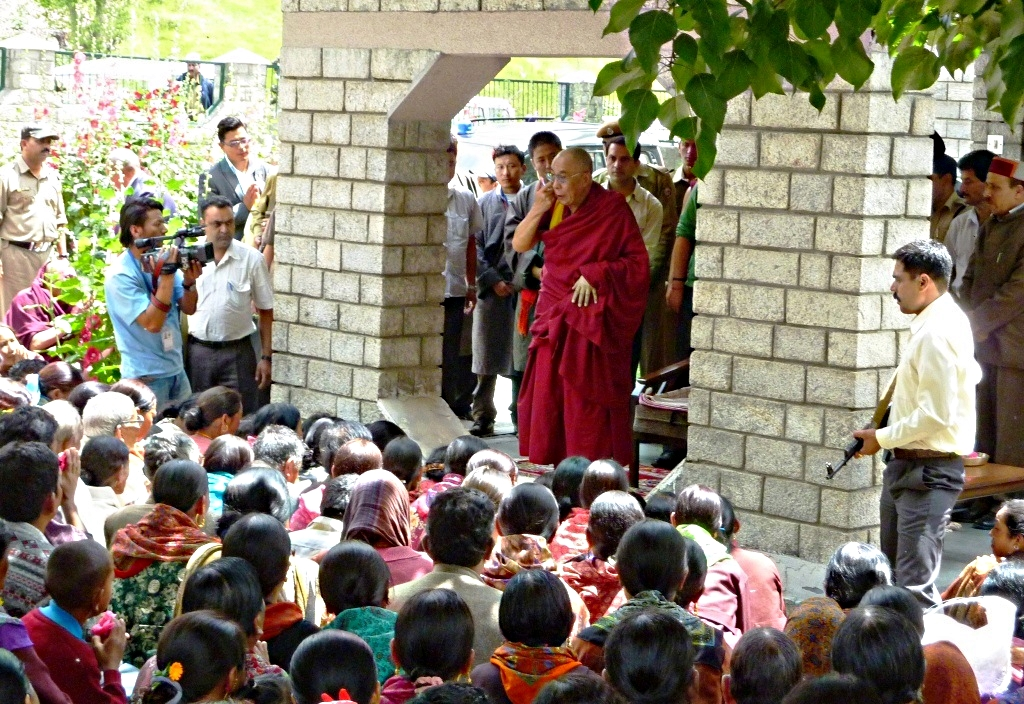
The Dalai Lama talking to pilgrims at Sissu. August, 2010

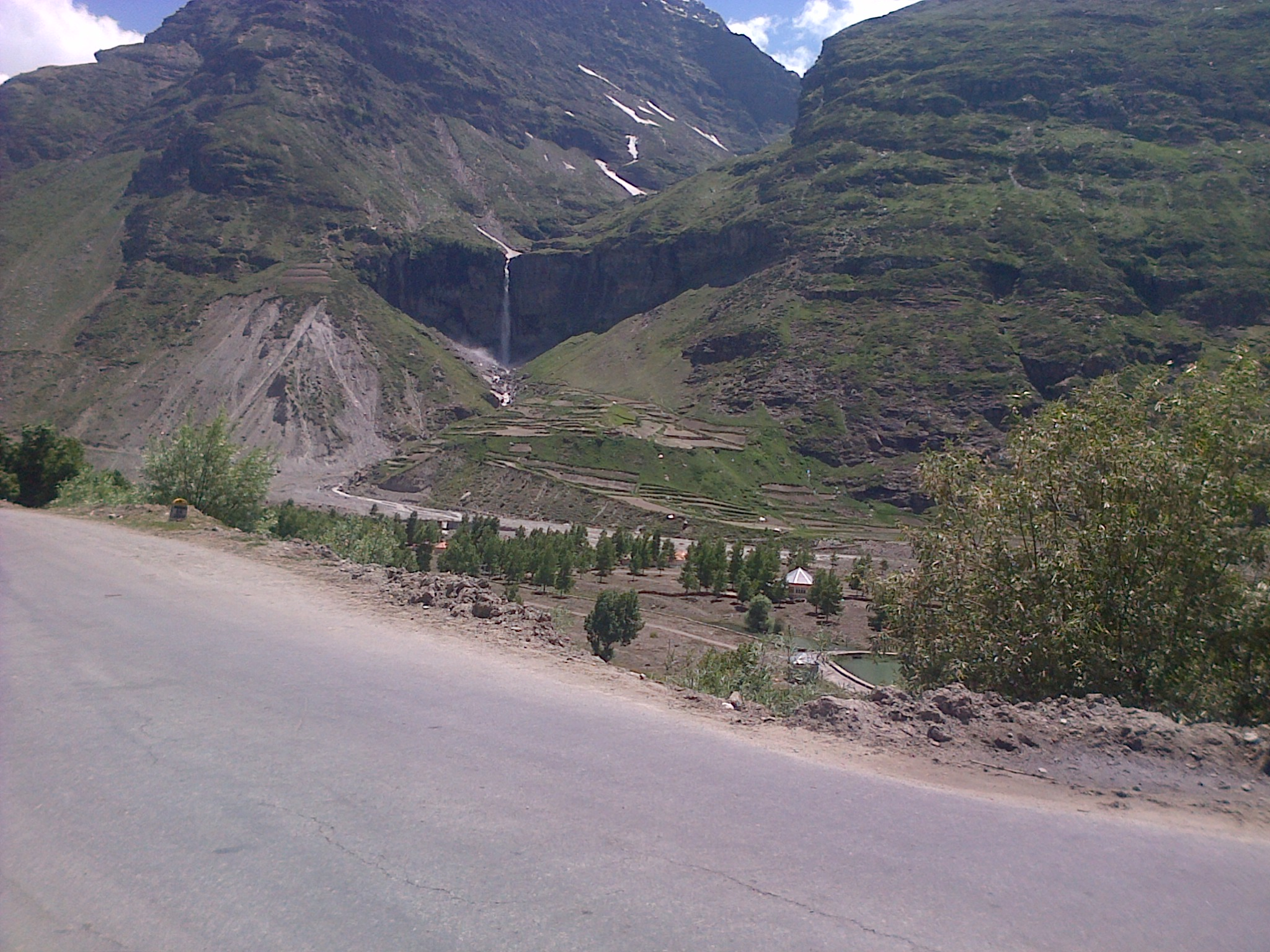
Sissu waterfall

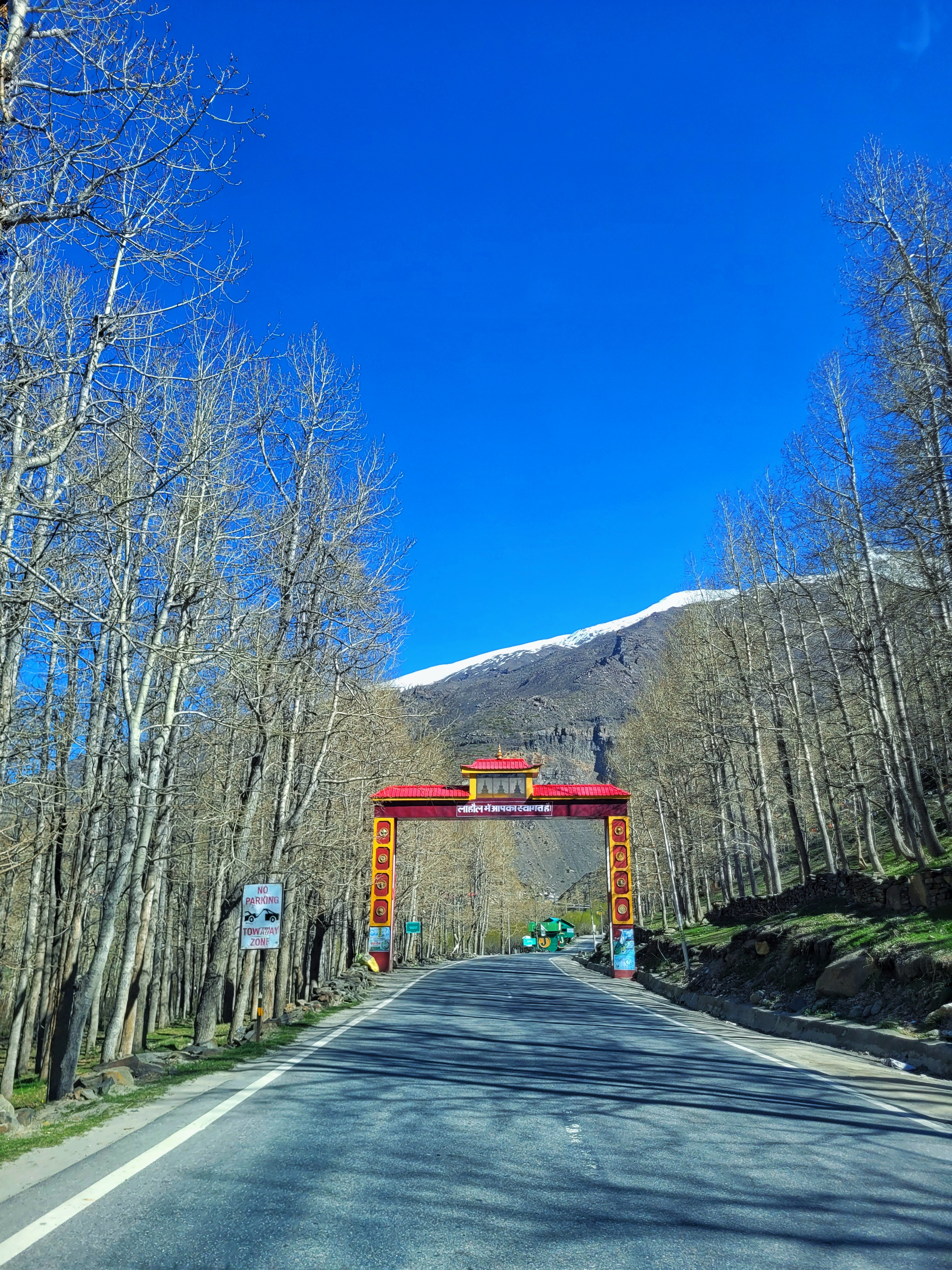
Sissu - Lahaul Gate

== See also ==
- Leh–Manali Highway
