= Zingzingbar =

Zingzingbar Zing Zing Bar
- camp, way-station
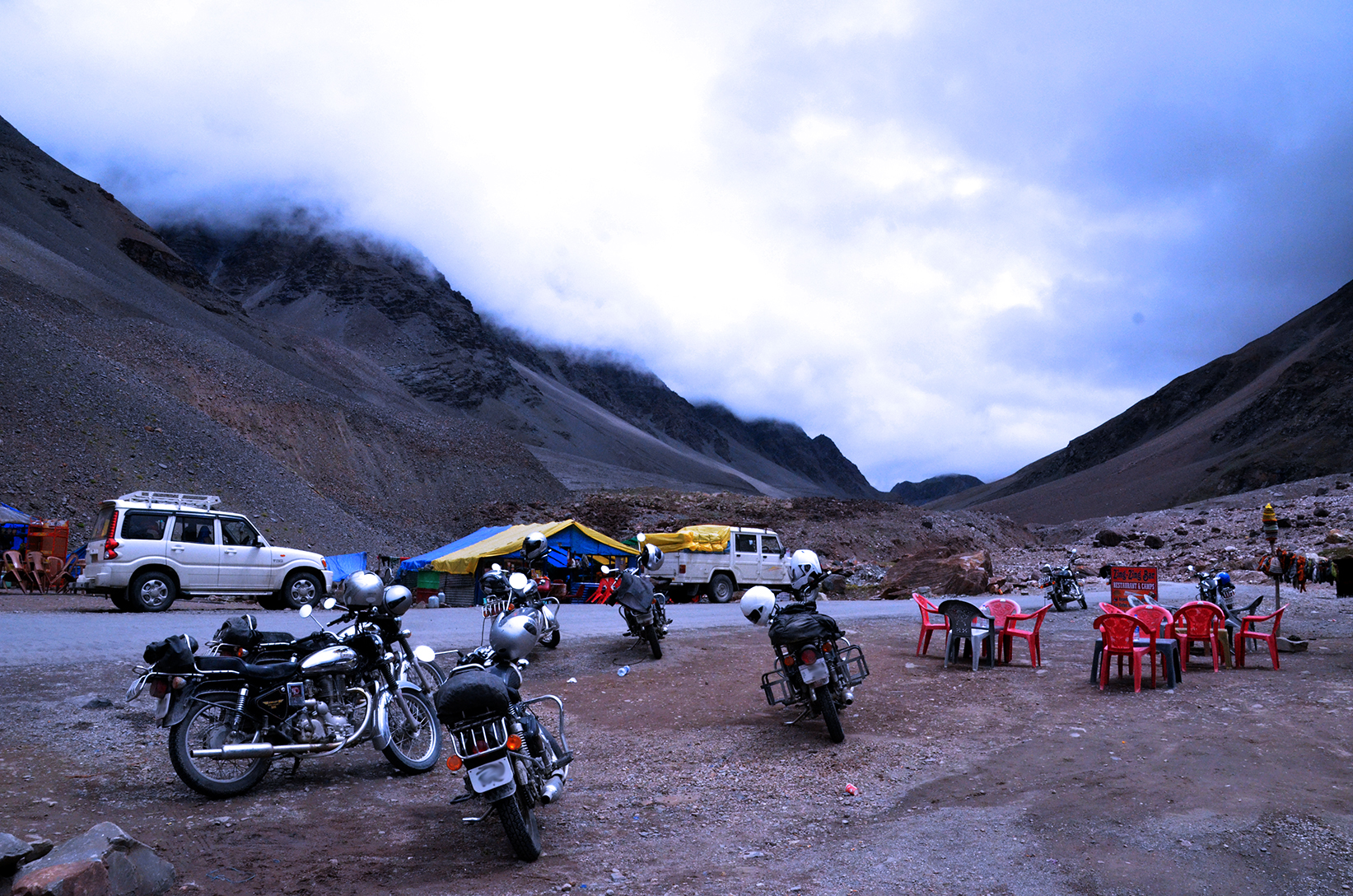
- View of Zingzingbar

- Location in Himachal Pradesh, India Zingzingbar (India)
- Coordinates: 32.7918924°N 77.3245239°E
- Country: India
- State: Himachal Pradesh
- District: Lahaul and Spiti
- Elevation: 4,270 m (14,010 ft)
- Time zone: UTC+5:30

Zingzingbar is a Border Roads Organization road-building camp and tea house way-station situated 25 kilometres (16 mi) from Darcha on the Manali to Leh road in the Lahaul and Spiti district of Himachal Pradesh. It is situated at an altitude of around 14,010 feet (4,270 m). The location has temporary shelters and dhabas that can be used by trekkers and tourists for accommodation.

Zingzingbar is the proposed south portal of the Bara-lacha-la tunnel, situated approximately 125 kilometres (78 mi) from Manali. The north portal of this tunnel is expected to be at Keylong Sarai. The tunnel will reduce the transit time on the avalanche and landslide prone route by up to 2 hrs.

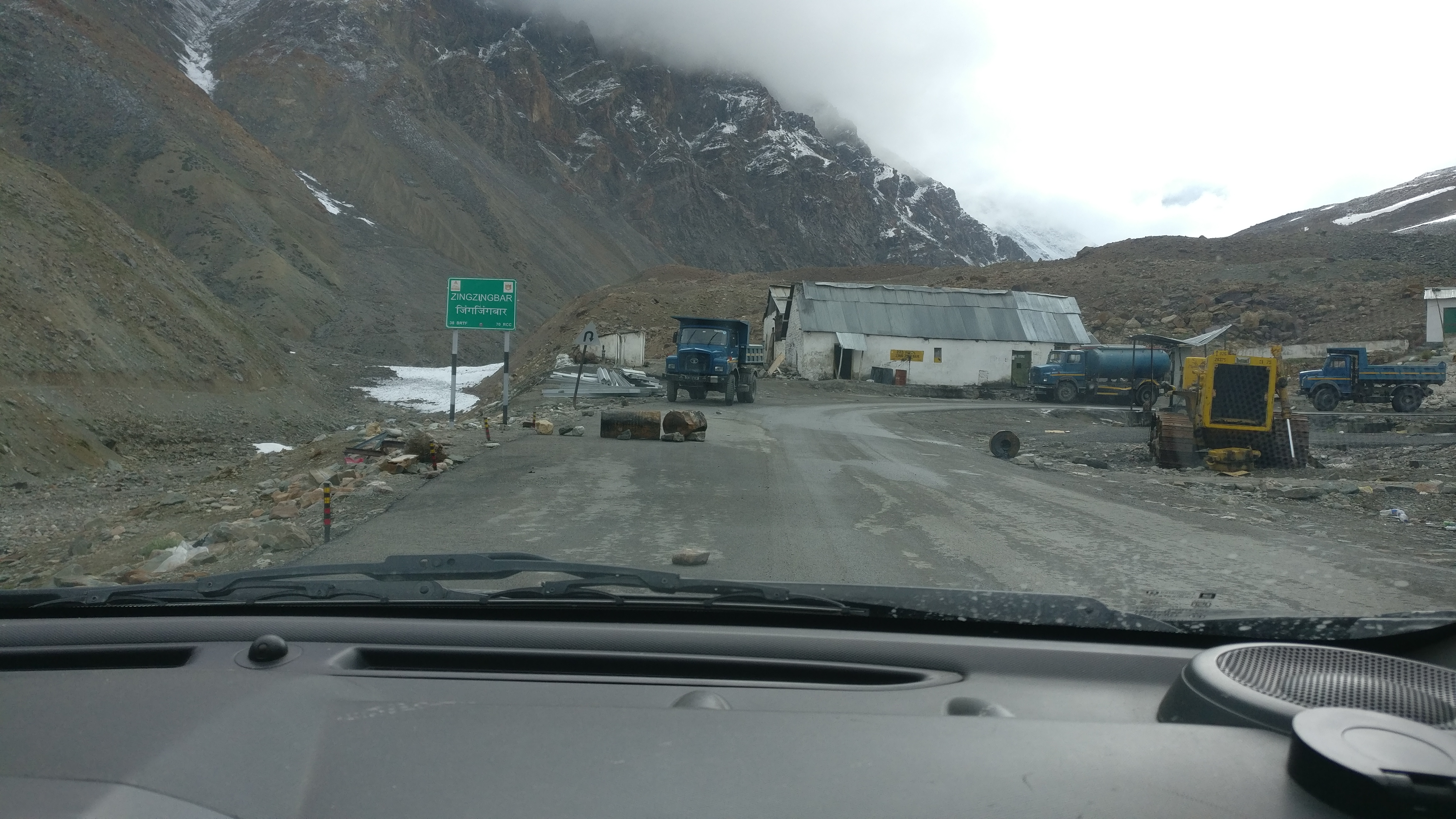
Zingzingbar
