= Tinno, Lahaul =

Tinno
- Village
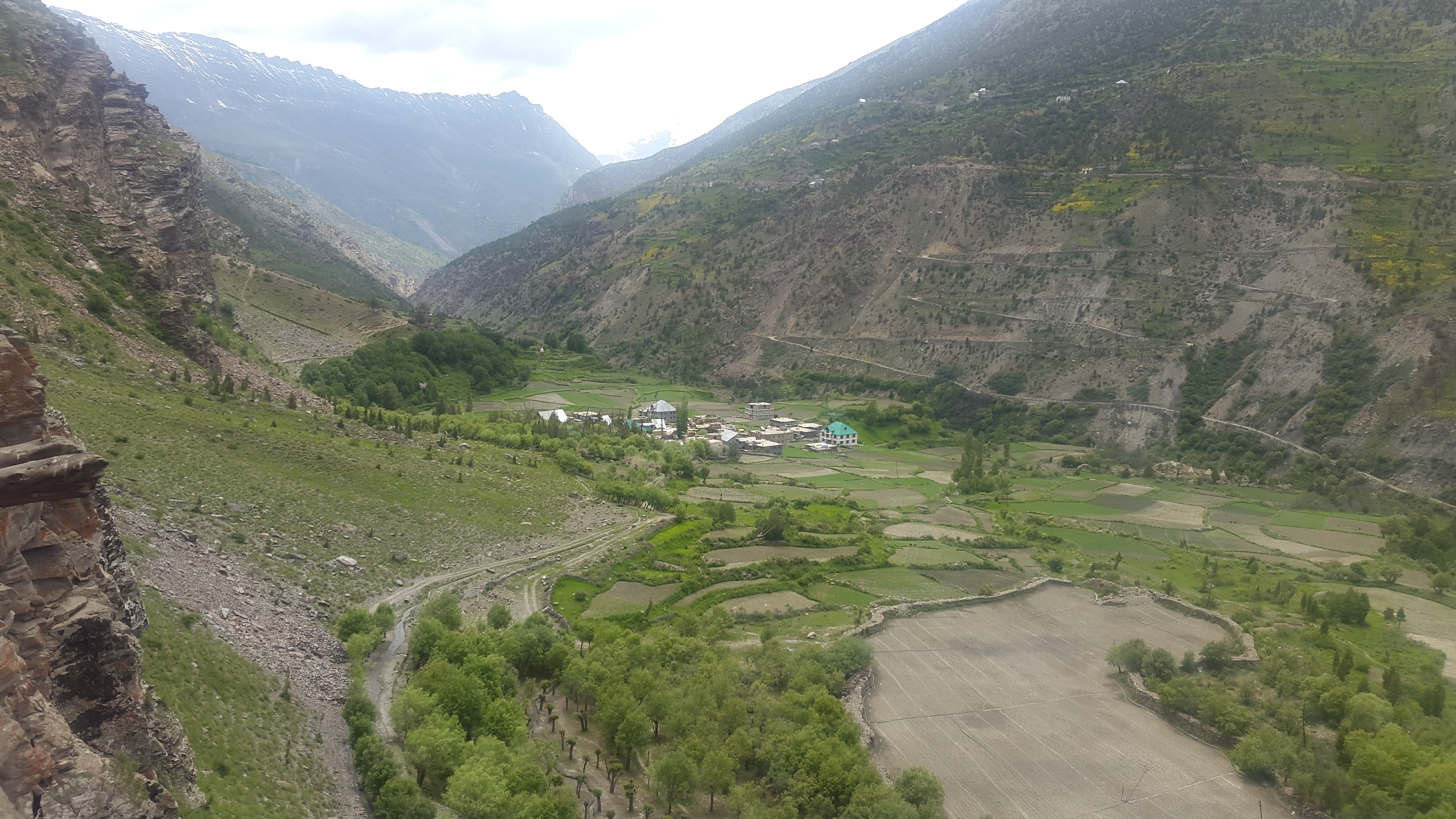

- Location in Himachal Pradesh, India Tinno (India)
- Coordinates: 32°34′48″N 77°7′48″E
- Country: India
- State: Himachal Pradesh
- District: Lahaul and Spiti
- Elevation: 3,200 m (10,500 ft)

Population (2011)
  - Total: 125

Languages
  - Official: Hindi
- Time zone: UTC+5:30 (IST)

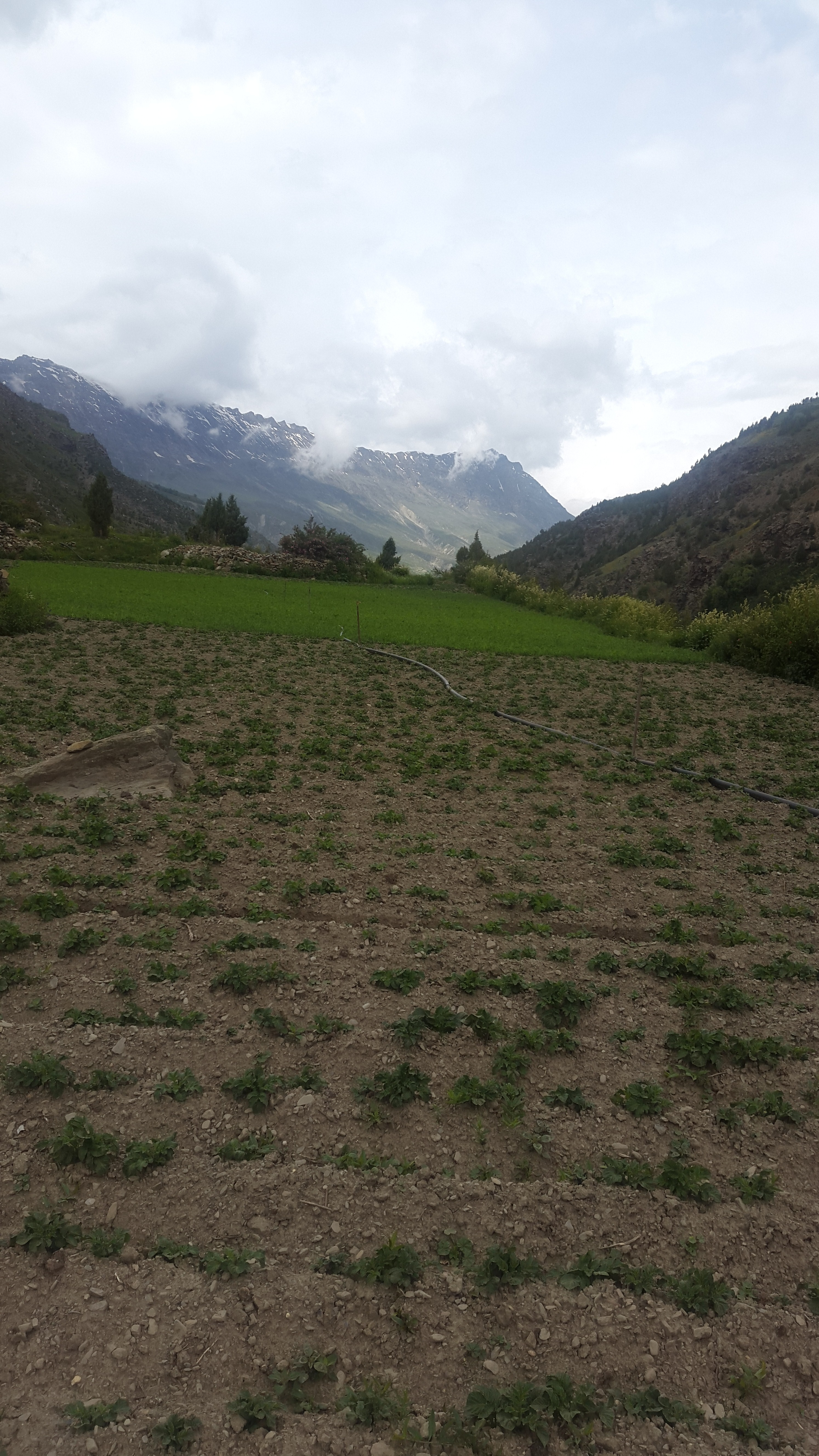
potato field in Tinno

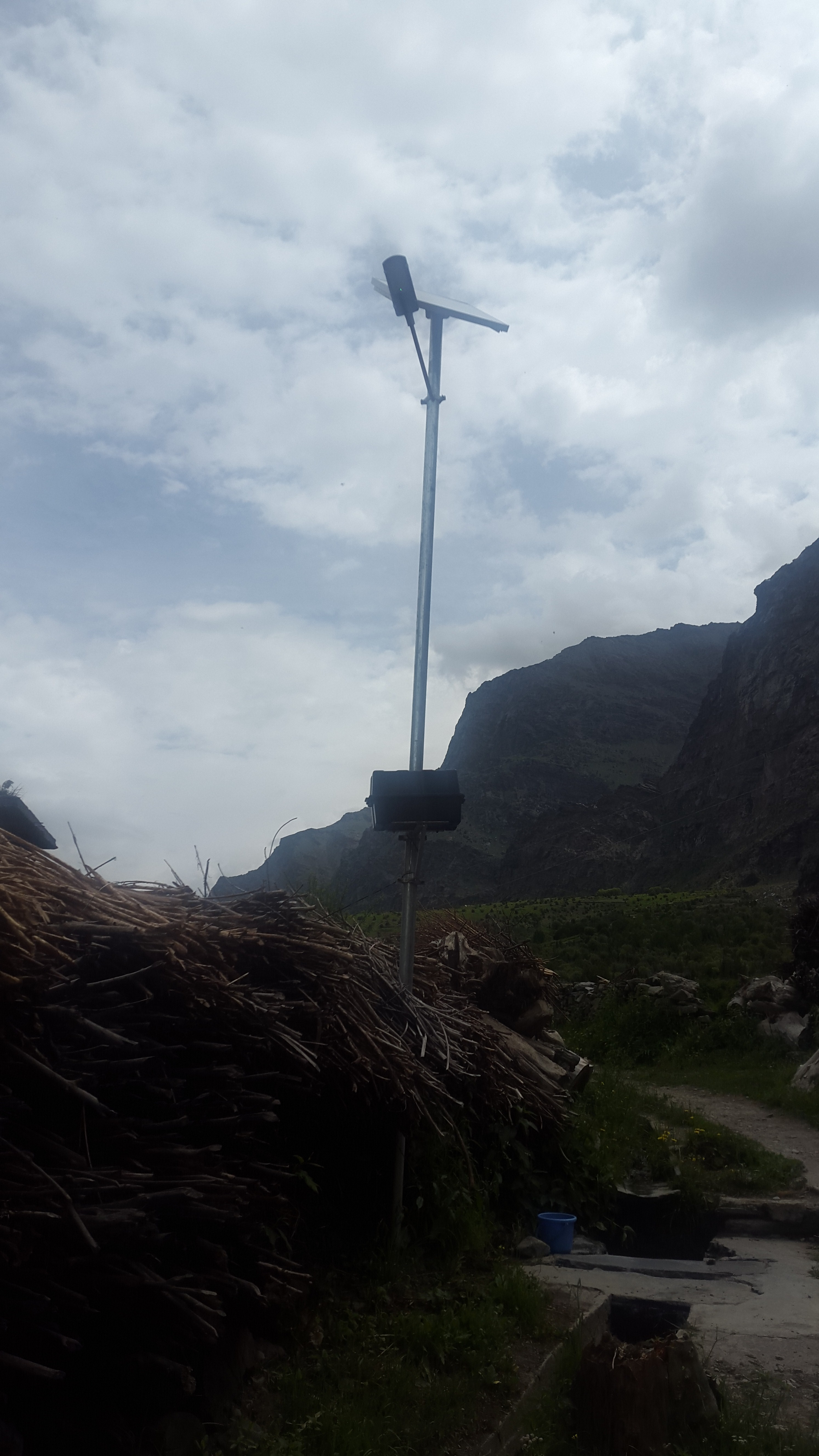
Solar light in village

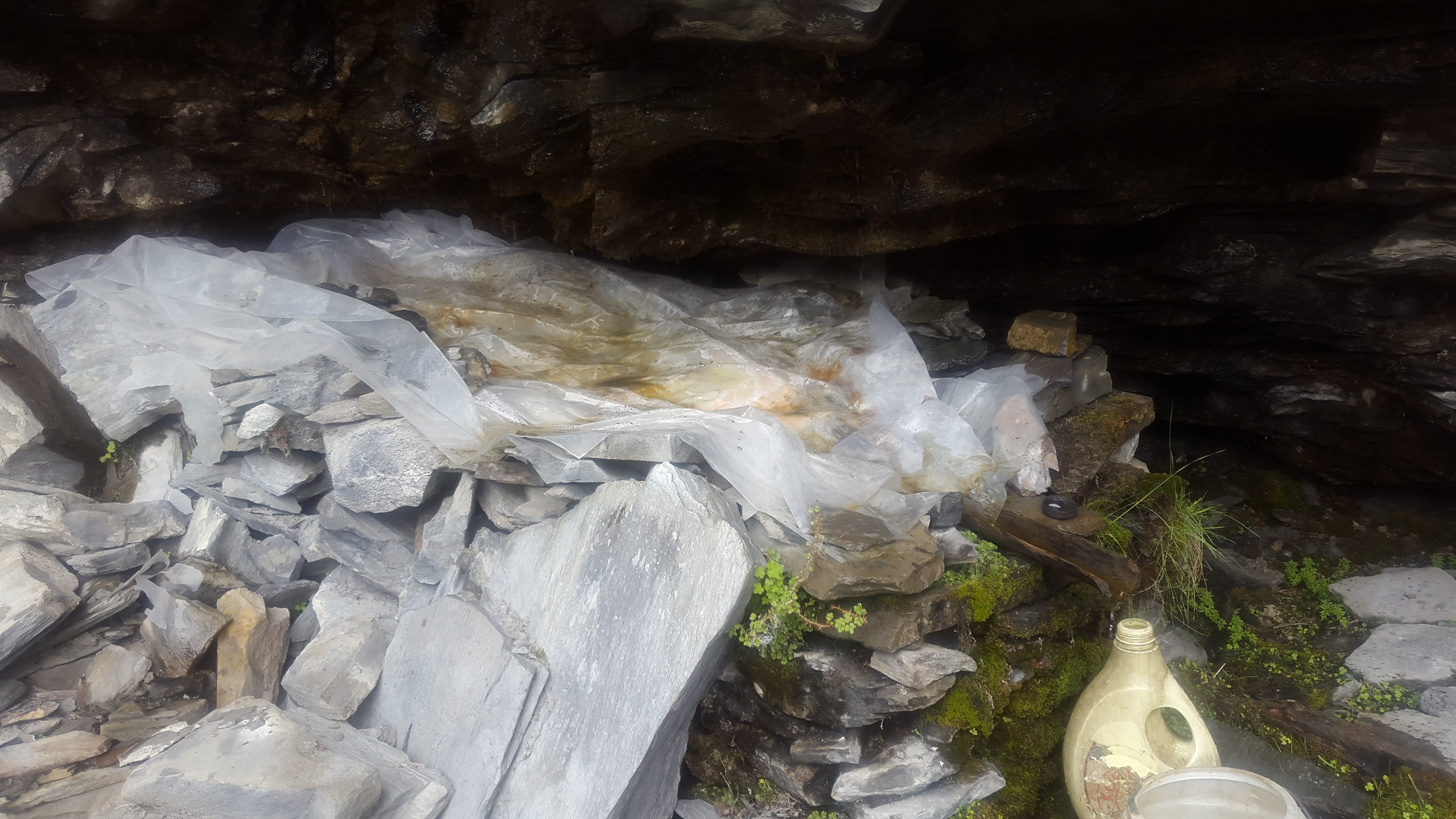
Medicinal water collected at Zong gompa

Tinno is a village in Lahaul and Spiti district of Himachal Pradesh. It is around 14 km from Keylong, which is district headquarters. The village is along Manali-Leh Highway on left bank of Bhaga river, which originates from Suraj Taal lake. It has a total of 29 families residing in the village. The Tinno village has a population of 125, of which 59 are males while 66 are females as per Population Census 2011. In 2011, the literacy rate of Tinno village was 82.35%. In Tinno male literacy stands at 87.72% while female literacy rate was 77.42%. As per constitution of India and Panchyati Raaj Act, Tinno village is administrated by a Sarpanch who is elected representative of village. Tinno is situated on the right bank of the Chandra River in the Lahaul valley.

Losar is celebrated as new year in Tinno and the entire Todh valley of lahaul. Halda is prepared on first day of Losar. Halda means firelight. The Atal tunnel will provide all weather connectivity to lahaul valley and tinno. Excavation work for the tunnel will complete in 2017 and tunnel will be opened to public in 2019. The village is being illuminated by solar lights at night. There are 12 solar light points at different places in the village.

== Gallery ==
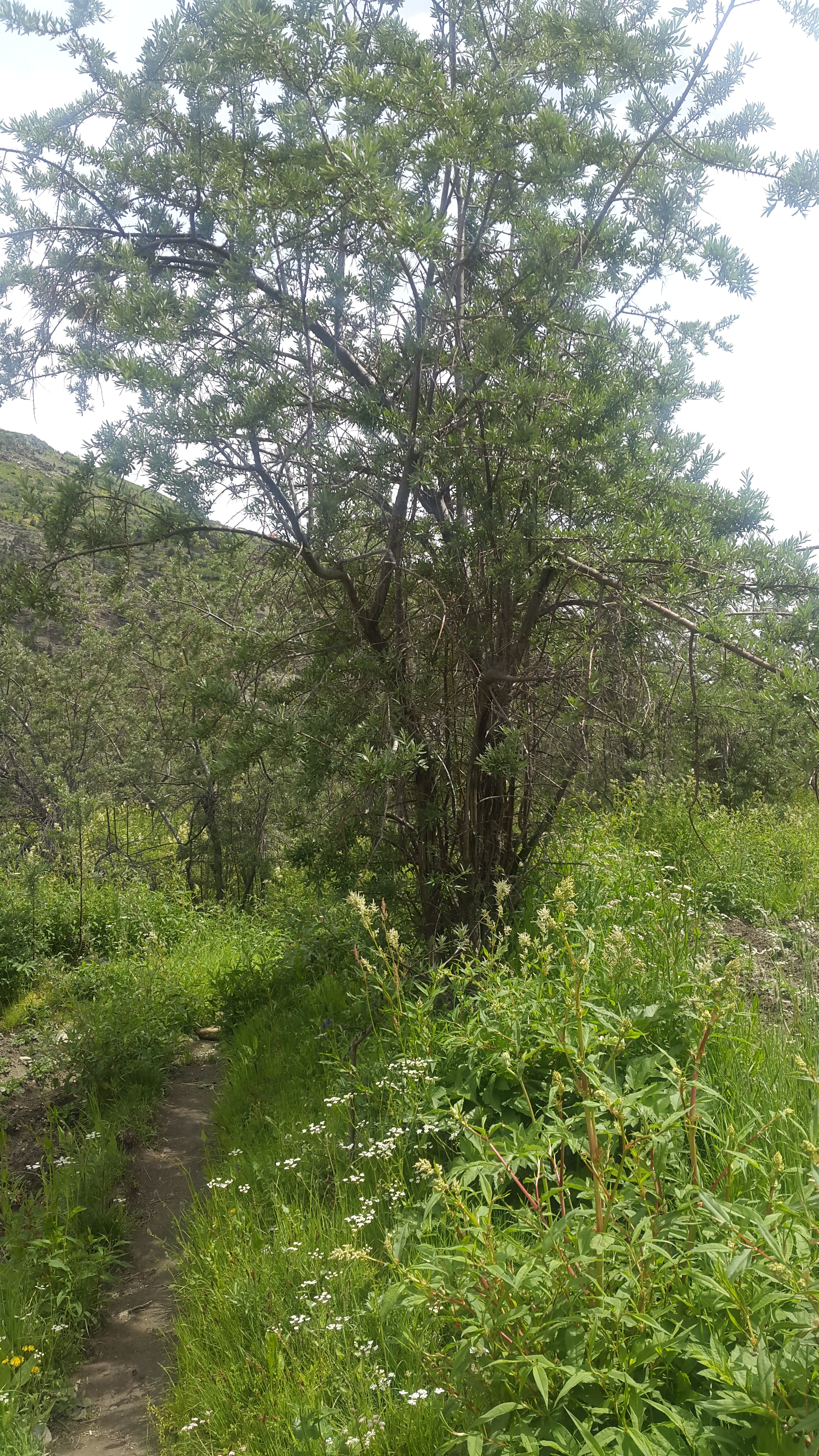
Sea buckthorn tree in tinno village

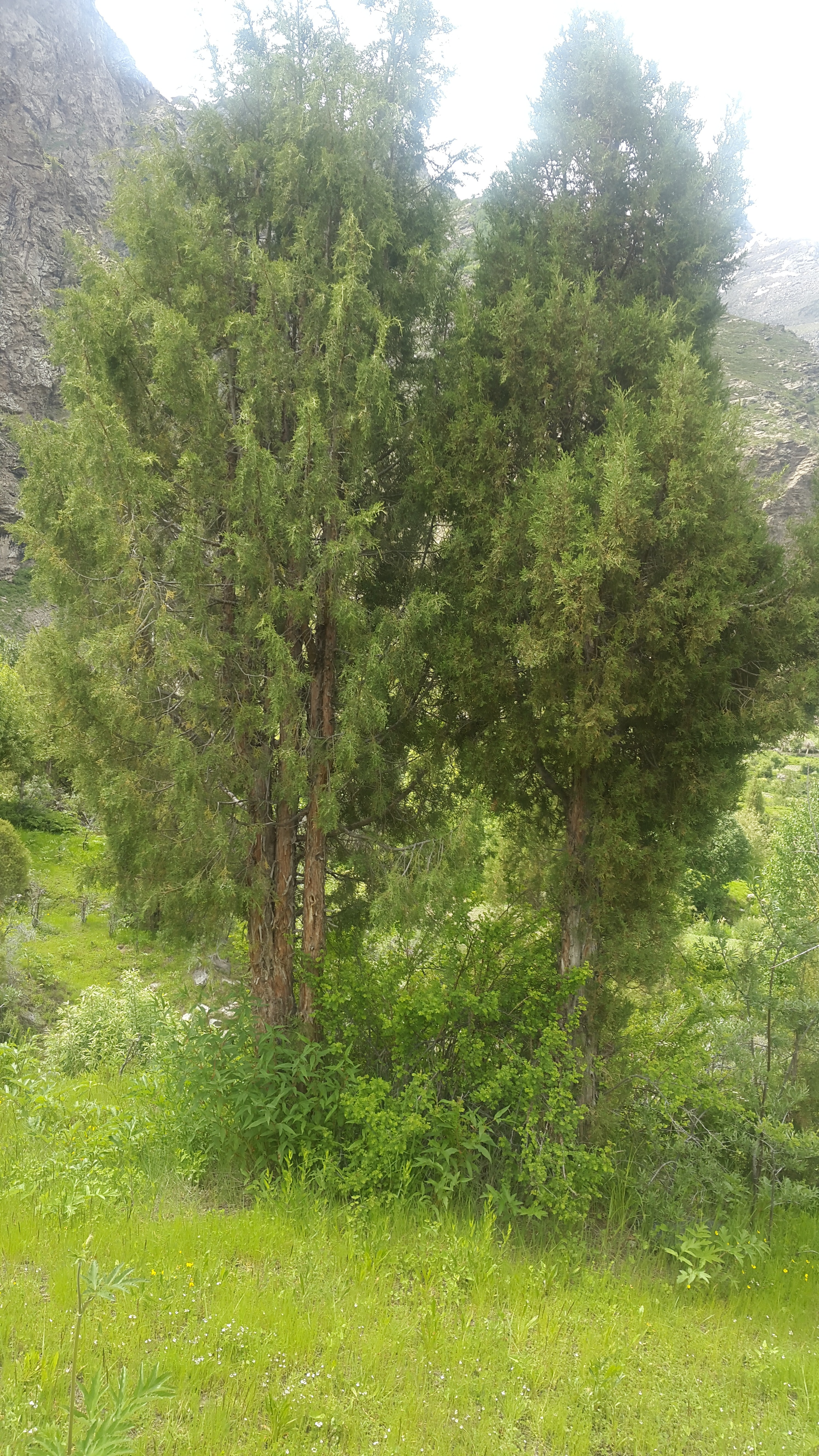
Juniper tree in tinno

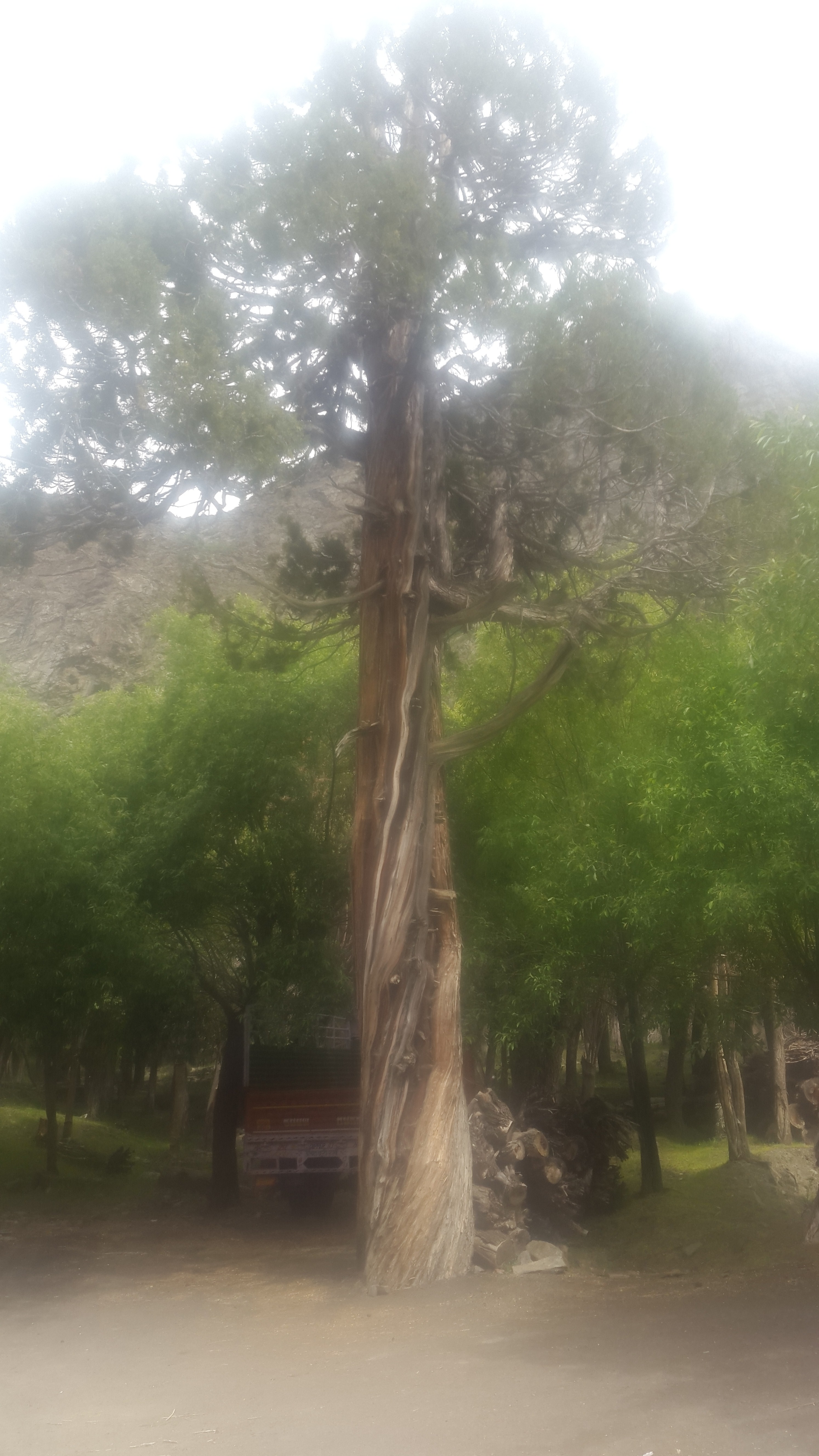
Juniper tree in tinno2

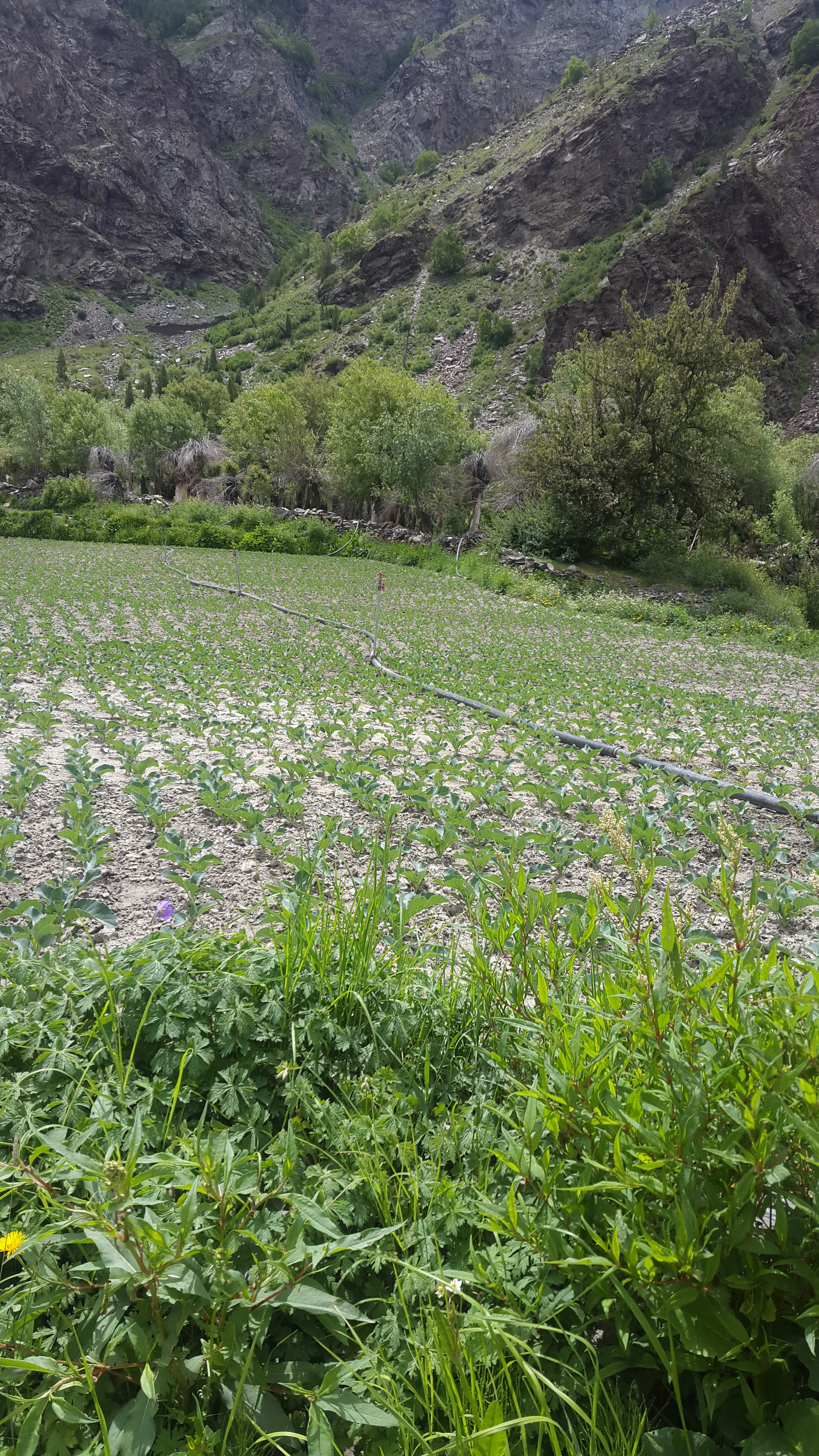
Cauliflower crop in tinno

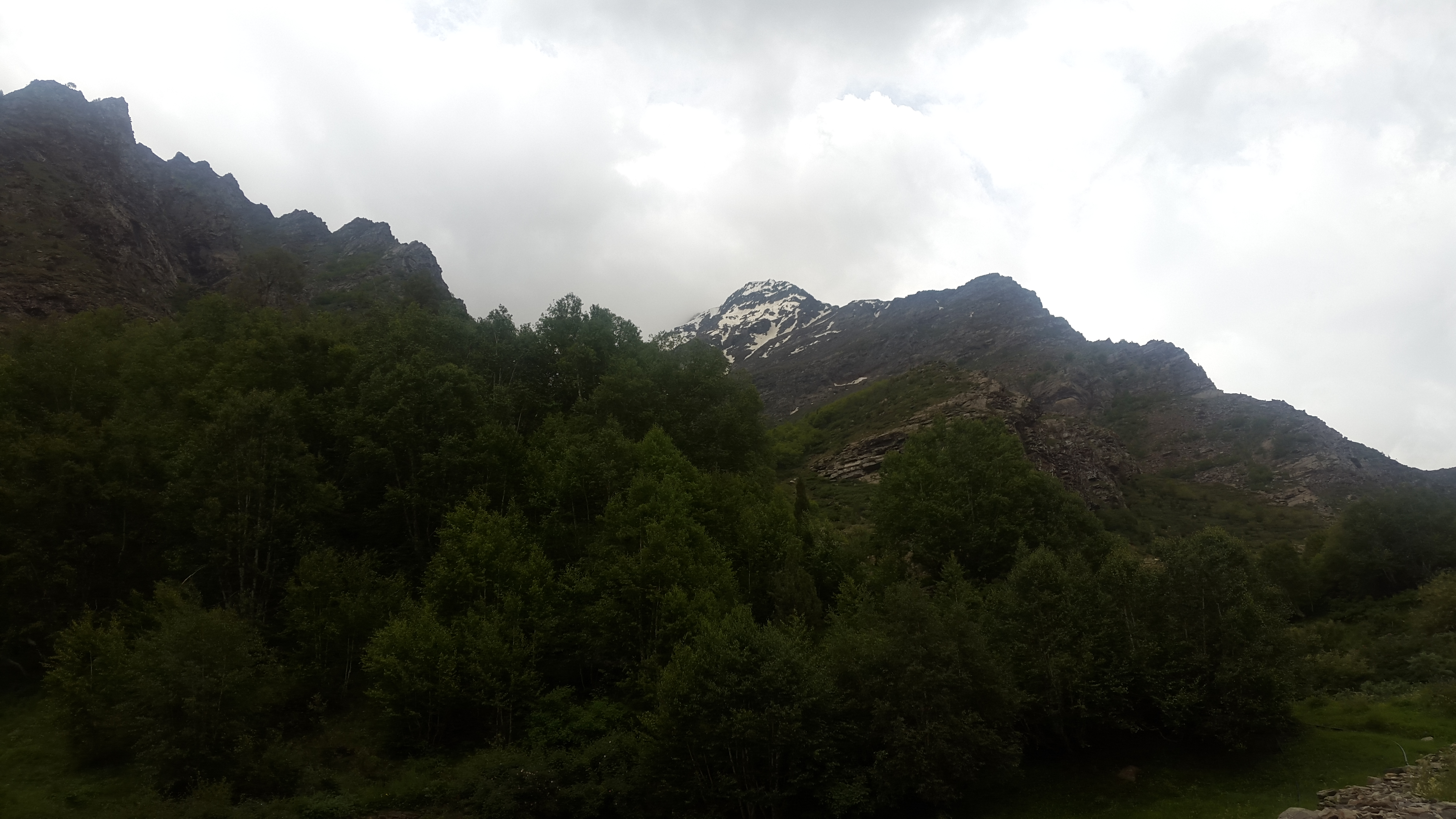
Bhojpatra jungle in tinno village

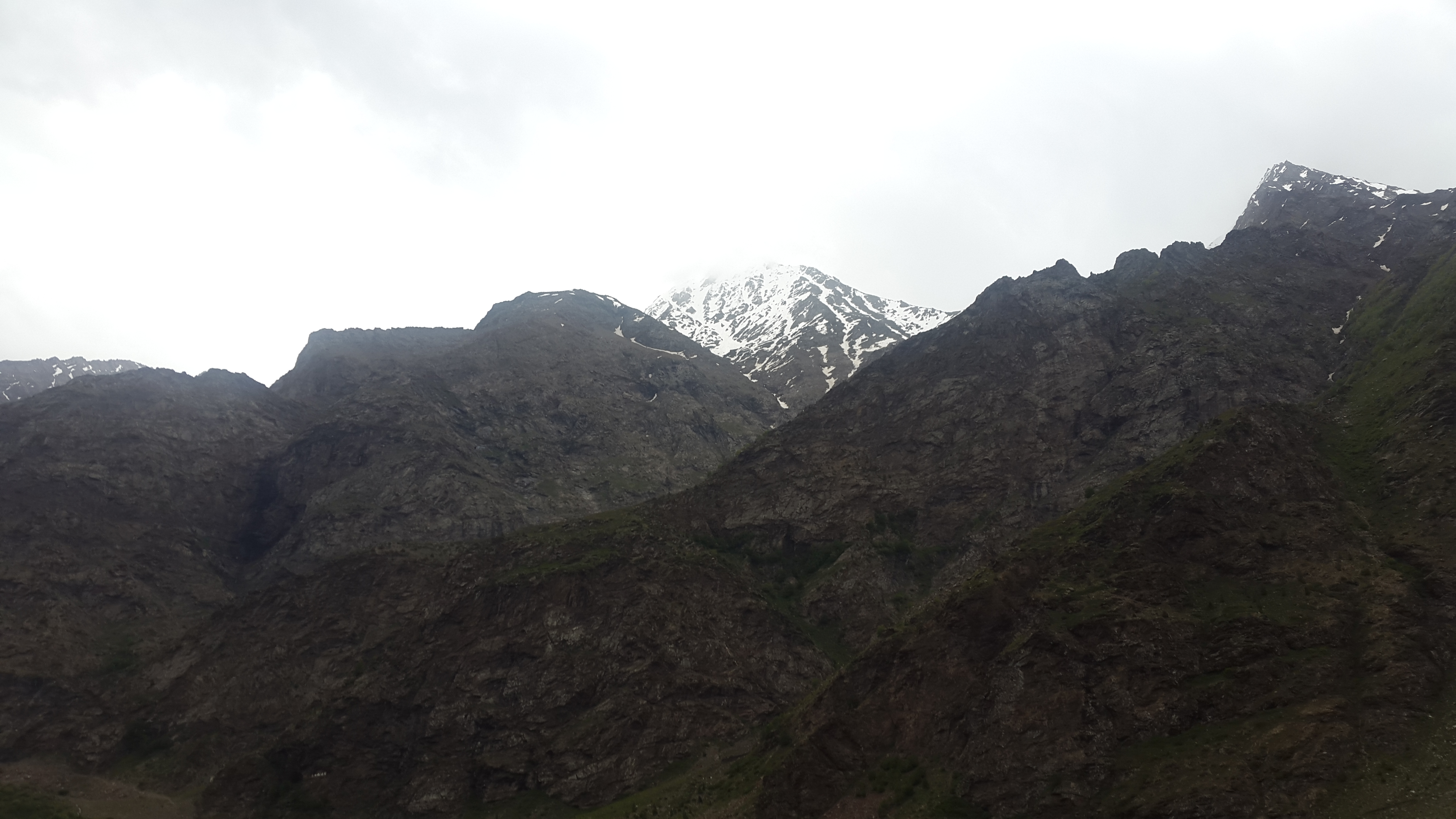
mountain behind tinno village

== Religion ==
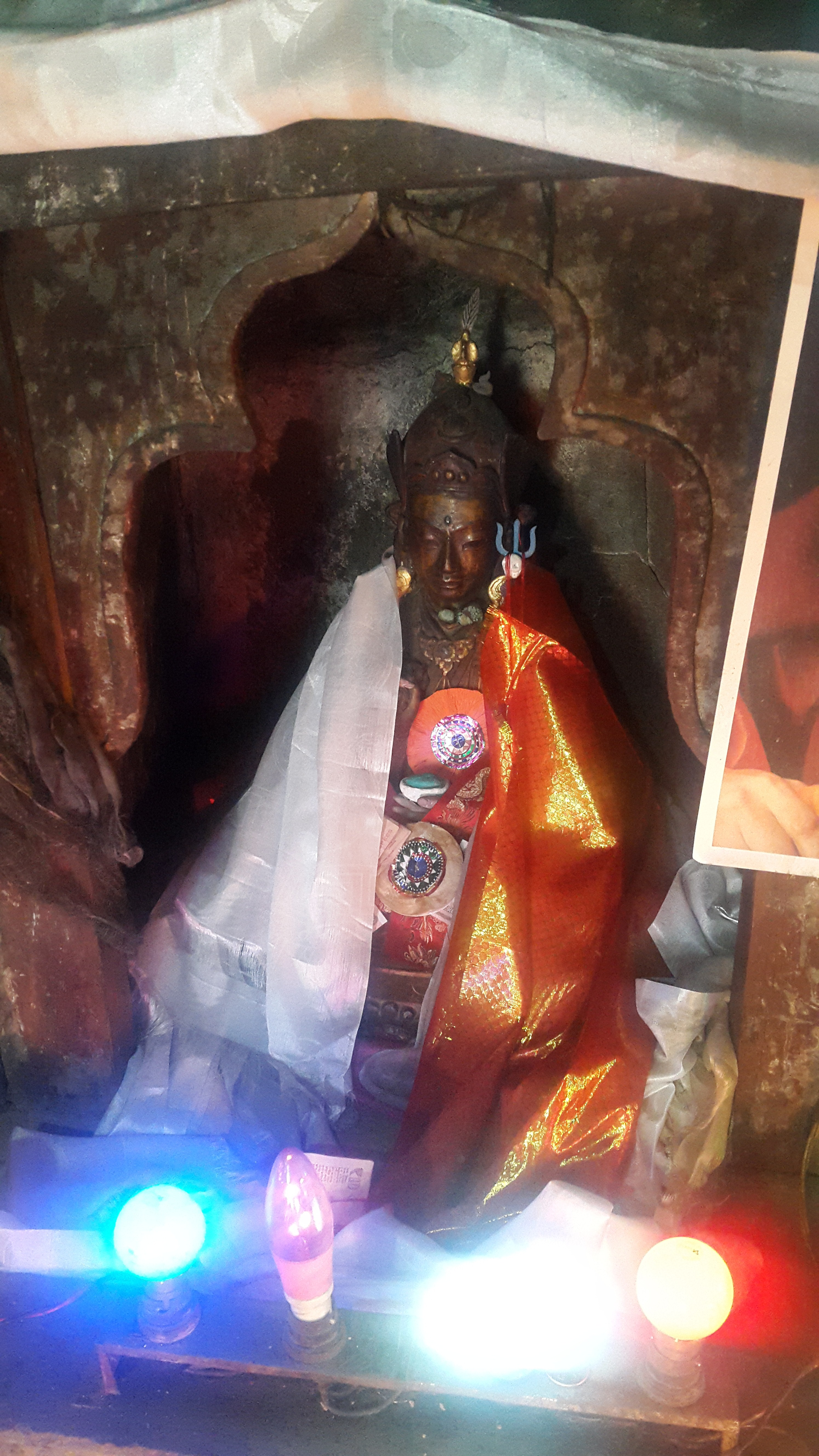
Guru Rinpoche at Tinno Monastery

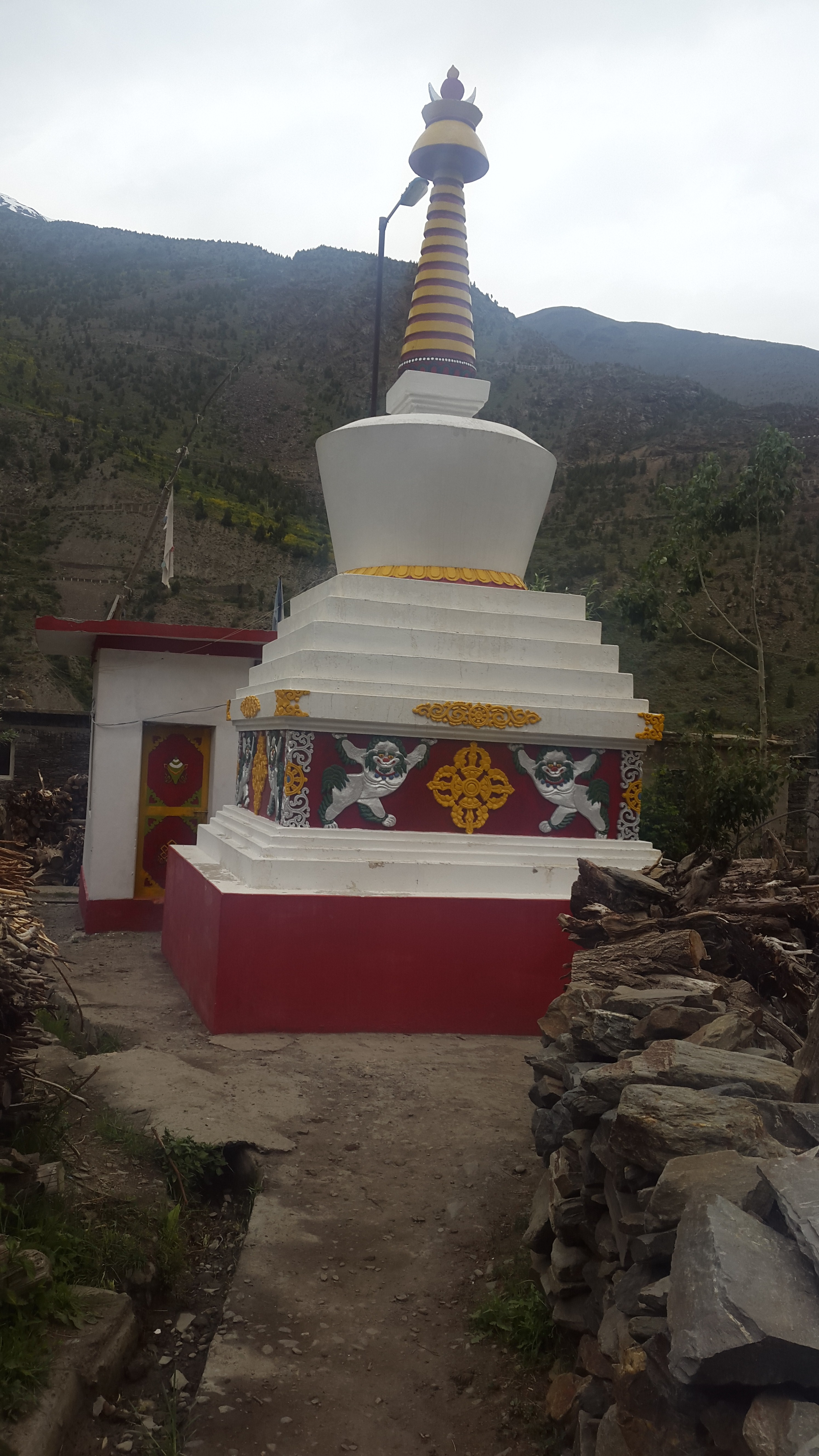
Stupa at tinno village

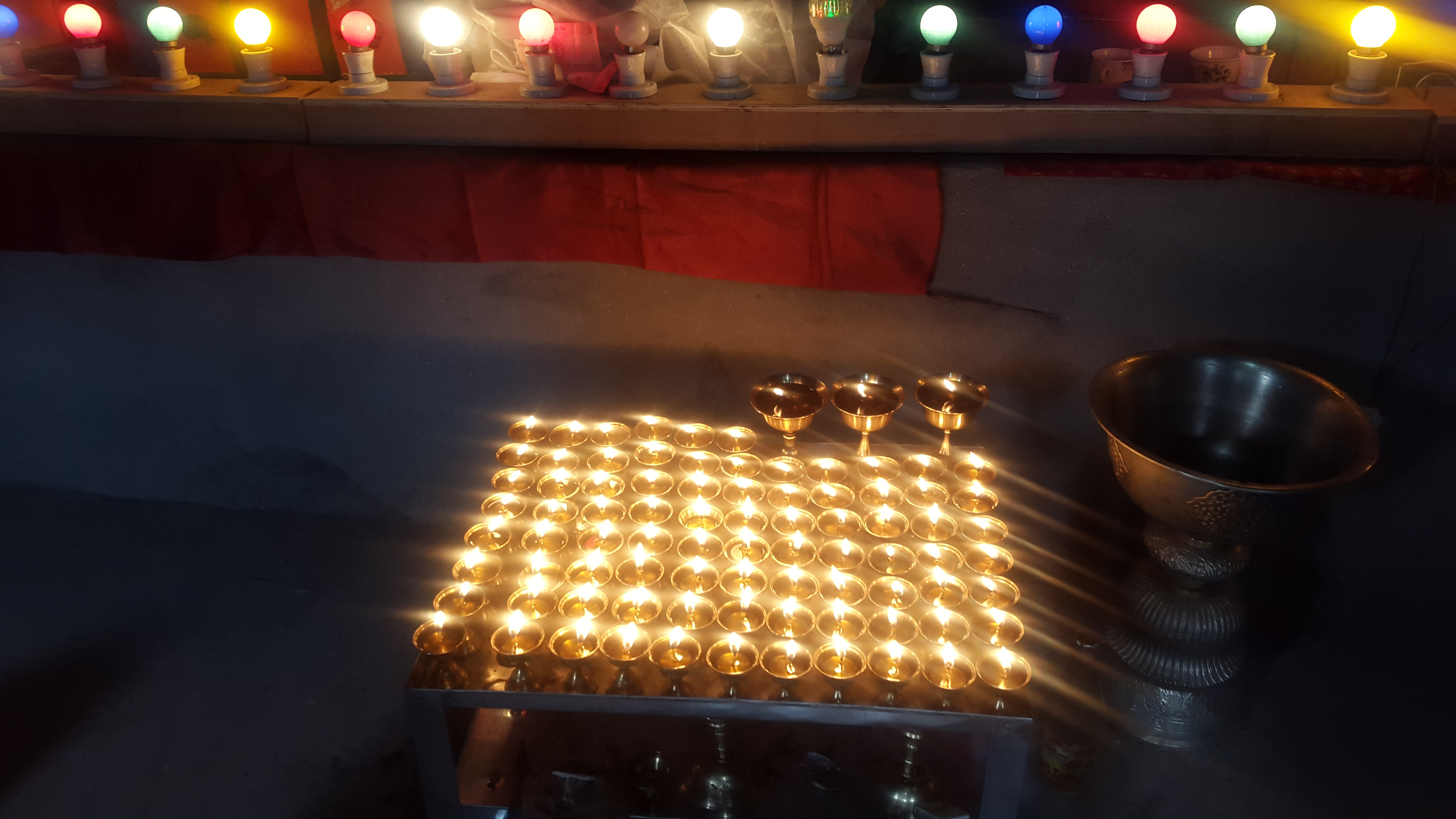
Diyas at tinno monastery

Buddhism is followed throughout tinno village. Tambarigya is the religious ceremony for well being of village and local people. Soldev is the religious ceremony of good omen for the village and to discard evil spirits from the village. These ceremonies are performed by buddhist Lamas. Zong gompa is the monastery of the village. It is situated above the village in between the mountains. There is a statue of Guru Padamsambhava(Guru Rinpoche) in the monastery which is being worshiped by the villagers. Water is being collected drop by drop in Zong Gompa(monastery) tinno. This water remains fresh like holy Ganges. It has medicinal value which cures eye diseases. A Rabne(Prana Pratishtha) of Thangka was performed at Tinno village. The 9th Kyabje Drukpa Choegon Rinpoche Tenzin Chokyi Gyatso performed Rabne on 9 June, 2018 and Tsewang Tsetub(Dirghayu Abhishek) was given to people of Tinno and of surrounding villages on 10 June 2018.

== Wildlife ==
Phea, a bear-like animal that eats crops and remains in hibernation during winter, is found in the village Tinno. The paw of ibex creates vacuum and it easily climbs the hills.

== Agriculture and Vegetation ==
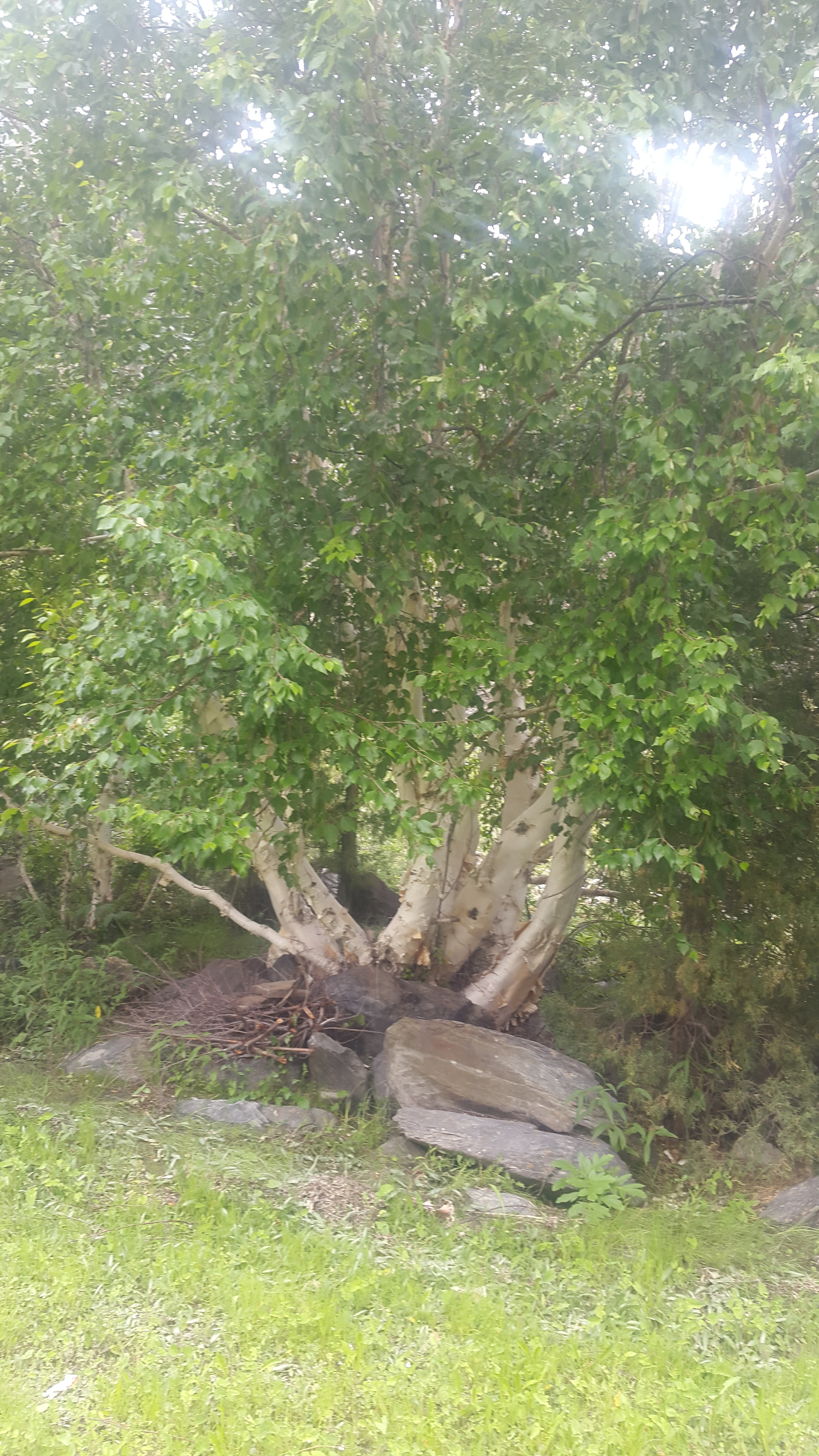
Bhoj patra tree in tinno village

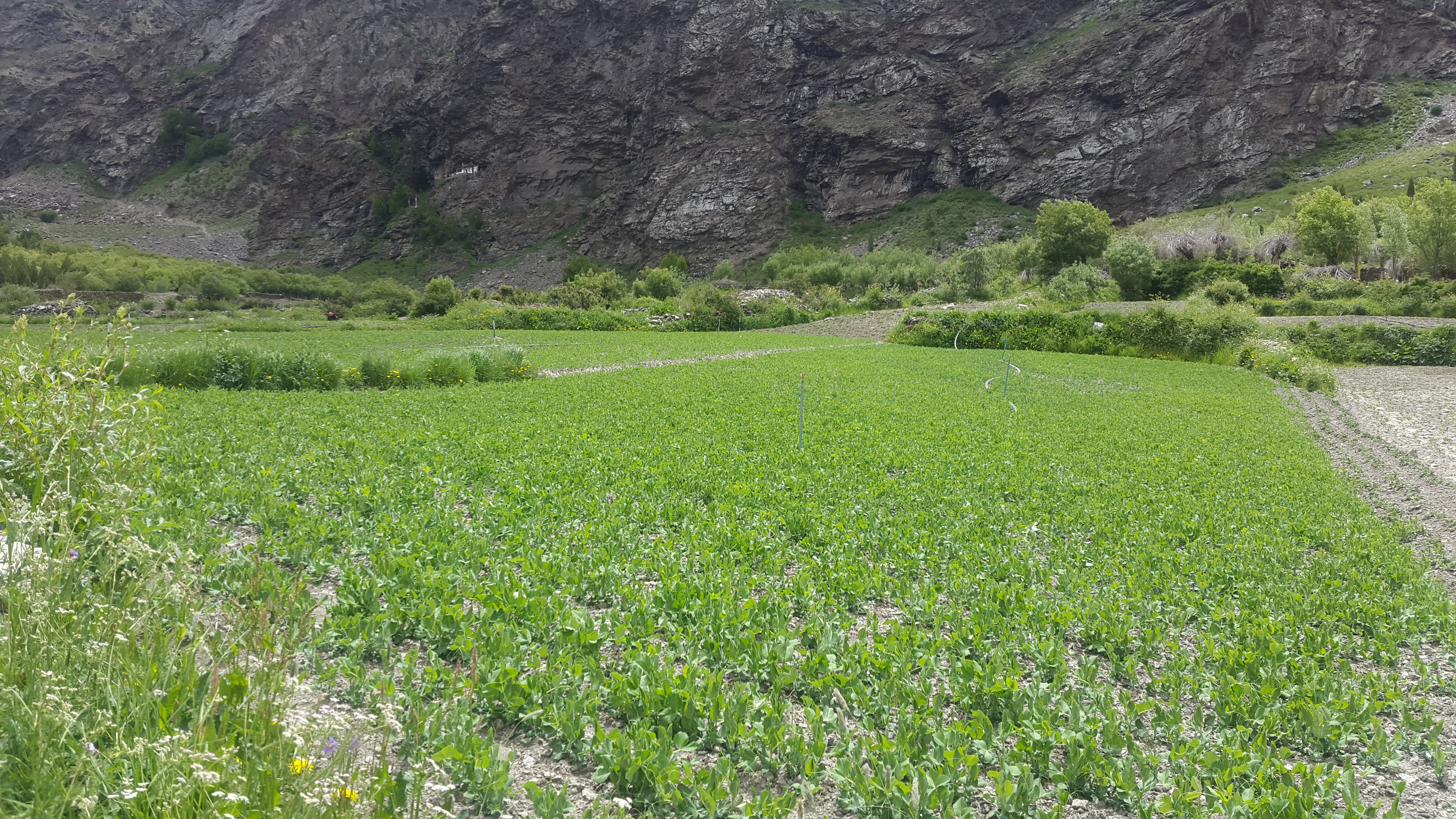
Green peas crop

Potato, green peas and cauliflower are the main agricultural items here. Sea buckthorn trees grew naturally here but now are being planted by villagers also. Sea buckthorn(Hippophae salicifolia) studied in the Tinno village are best for the commercial cultivation because it bears few thorns and have bigger fruit size(28-32g/100 fruit). Other vegetation includes Betula utilis(bhojpatra), juniper, eucalyptus tree and willow trees. Fields are being irrigated through sprinkler system and through PVC pipes. Old system of flow channel is now outdated.

== Transport ==
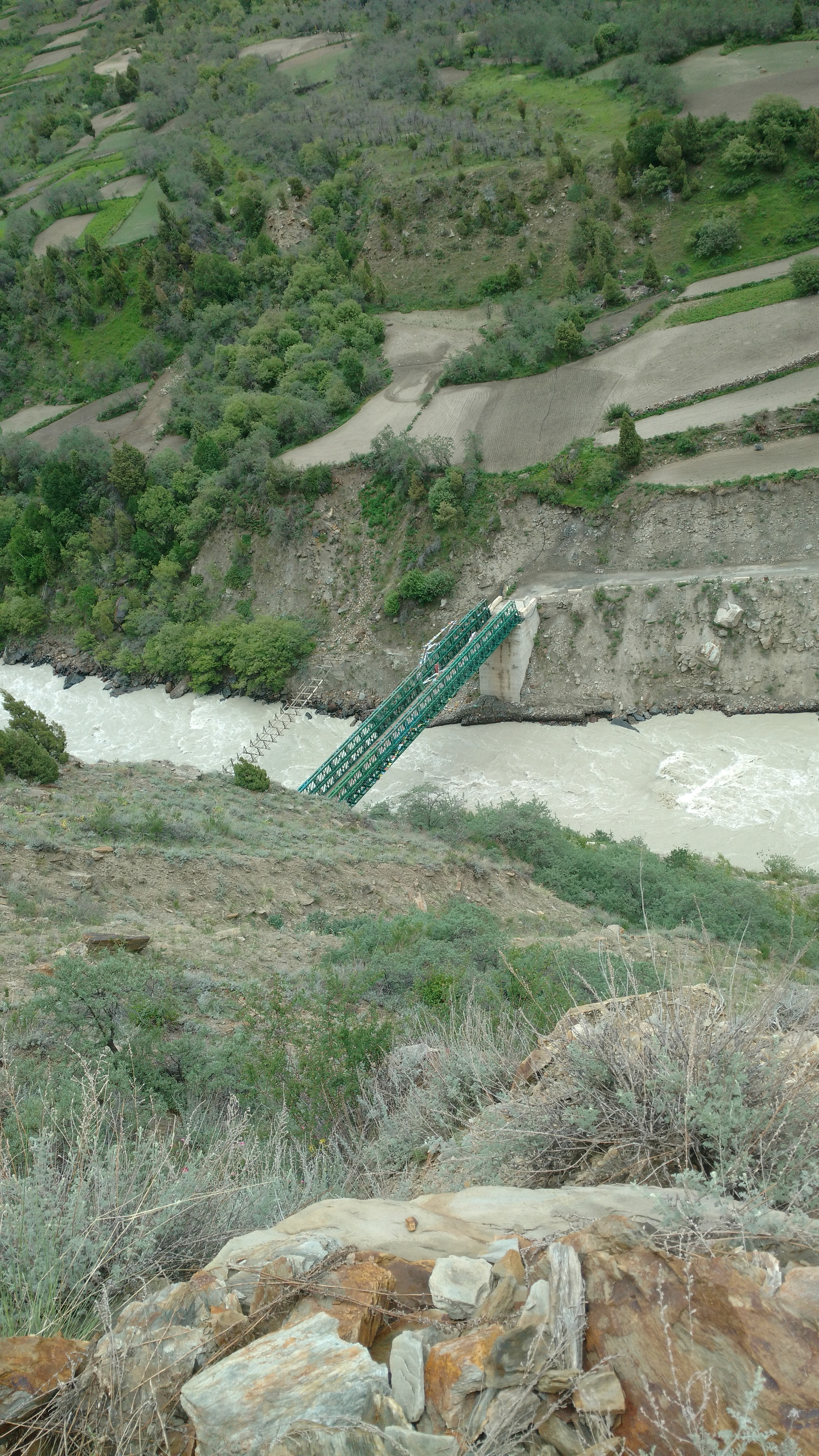
Bridge connecting Tinno village to Manali-Leh National Highway

There is bus service for village tinno at morning 8:30 AM for Kullu and evening 5:00 PM for Yotse. Bhunter Airport(IATA code KUU) is the nearest airport to Tinno. Manali is at a distance of 50 km (31 mi) from Bhunter town. Tinno is at a distance of 138 km (86 mi) from Manali along Leh-Manali highway. The Atal tunnel will shorten the distance by 46 km (29 mi). Total Length of Atal Tunnel is 8.845 km and bypasses Rohtang pass. It is horse shoe shaped, single tube, two lane tunnel with 8 meters of roadway. Drill & Blast method of tunneling with New Austrian Tunneling Method (NATM) philosophy is being used for the construction of the Atal Tunnel.
