= Khardong =

Khardong may refer to:

- Kardang, a village in Himachal Pradesh, India
  - Khardong Monastery located in Kardang
- Khardong, Leh, a village in Jammu & Kashmir, India; location of Khardung La pass
  - Khardong La or Khardung La, mountain pass located near Khardong, Leh
