= Yangrang =

- Village
- Location within Himachal Pradesh Location within India
- Coordinates: 32°36′10″N 76°57′08″E
- Country: India
- State: Himachal Pradesh
- District: Lahaul and Spiti

Yangrang is a village in the Lahaul and Spiti district of Himachal Pradesh, India. It is 25 km away from Keylong. It is a small village situated on the left bank of the river Chandrabhaga. The Nag temple is situated here.
