= Tshering Dorje =

Indian cultural historian

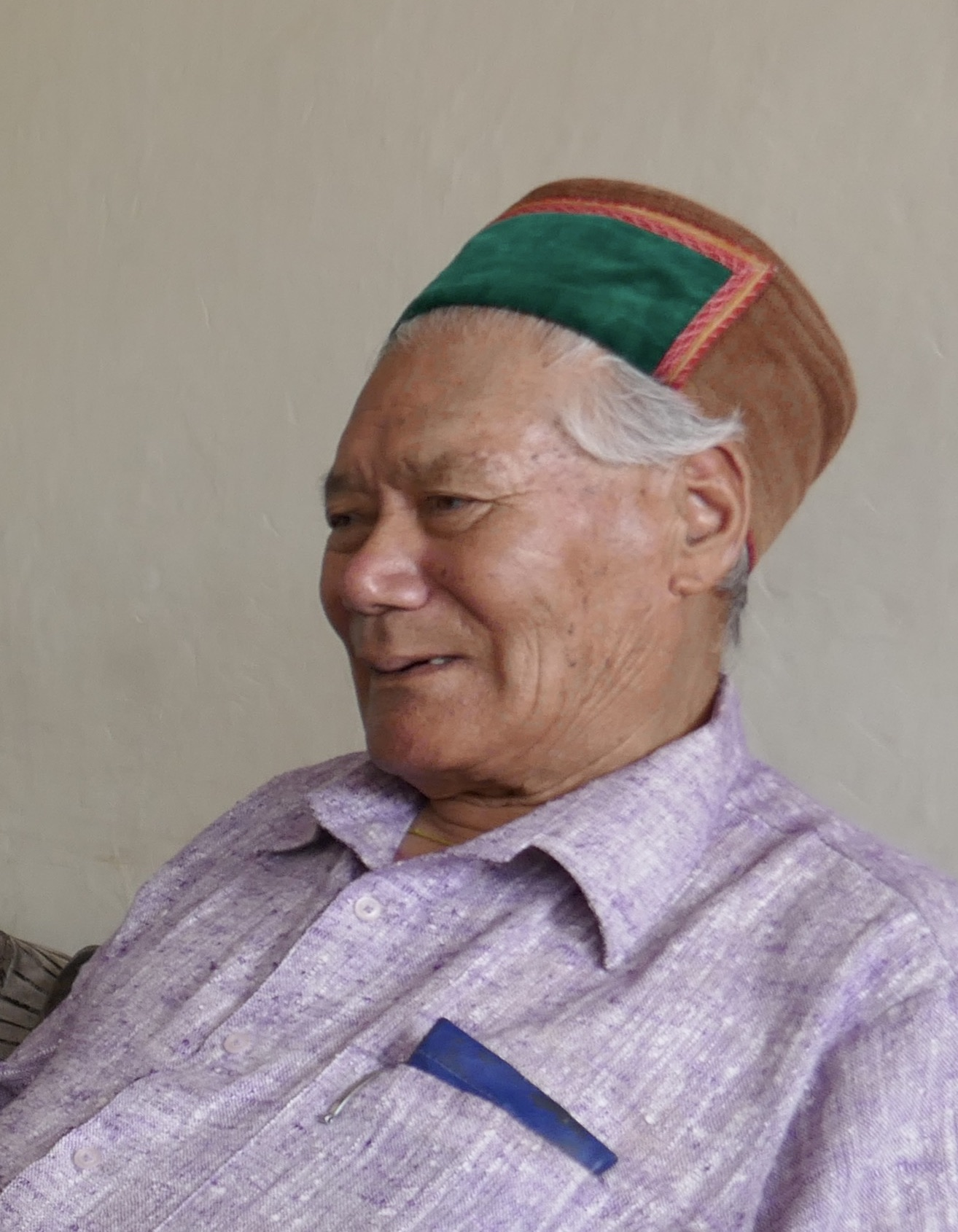
- Born: April 1936; Guskiar village, Lahaul tehsil, Kullu Sub-division, Kangra district, Punjab Province, British India
- Died: 13 November 2020 (aged 86); Mandi, Himachal Pradesh
- Education: Tholing monastery, Western Tibet; Sa-ngag-choling monastery, Central Tibet
- Occupation: Cultural historian
- Known for: Expertise on the cultural history of the Buddhist regions of the Western Himalayas; Role in the construction of the Atal Tunnel

Tshering Dorje (April 1936 – November 13, 2020; also spelled Tsering Dorje and Chhering Dorje) was a cultural historian from Himachal Pradesh, India. He was regarded as an authority on the cultural traditions and histories of the Lahaul and Spiti district and some neighboring regions. He also played an important role in bringing about the construction of the 9.02 km-long, high-altitude Atal Tunnel.

== Life and career ==
Dorje was born in village Guskiar of Gahar valley, Lahaul, Kullu tehsil, Kangra district, Punjab Province, British India – later a part of the Lahaul and Spiti district, Himachal Pradesh state. His family was Tibetan Buddhist and practiced agropastoralism. He received his schooling in Urdu medium at Keylong. Then, following family tradition, Dorje went to Tibet to train as a Lama. He first studied Tibetan language and Mahamudra at the Tholing monastery in western Tibet, and then went to the Sa-ngag-choling monastery in central Tibet to receive Kagyu teachings. However, he had to leave his education unfinished and return to Lahaul following political unrest in Tibet due to Tibet's annexation by the People's Republic of China. Following the creation of the Lahaul and Spiti district in 1960, Dorje got a job at the office of the Deputy Collector of the district at Keylong as a teacher of 'Bhoti' (Tibetan). In his youth, he had a meeting with the Russian Tibetologist George Roerich, which was influential in shaping his scientific and creative pursuits. After many years, Dorje was promoted to the position of Public Relations officer of the district. Following retirement, he divided his time between his native village Guskiar and Kullu.

Dorje died of COVID-19 on November 13, 2020, at Nerchowk Medical College, Mandi.

== Influence ==
=== Research and scholarship ===
Despite his limited formal education, Dorje came to be known for his extensive knowledge of western and Trans-Himalayan regions including Ladakh, Lahaul, Spiti, and Kinnaur. In Lahaul and Spiti district and neighboring regions, he was widely referred to as an 'encyclopedia of the Himalayas'. He was regarded as an expert on Tibetan language; Tibetan Buddhist scriptures; the Buddhist, Bon, and Hindu cultural traditions of the Lahaul and Spiti district; the Buddhist and pre-Buddhist history of Tibet, and the historical and cultural interrelations between the western Himalayas, Tibet, and Central Asia. Dorje also did some research on the Zhang Zhung language. He undertook numerous journeys on foot in the Himalayas.

Dorje was closely associated with the International Roerich Memorial Trust in Naggar for several decades. 1980 onwards, he collaborated with the Russian Indologist and Roerich scholar Ludmila Shaposhnikova over various research interests. In 2006, Dorje founded the Roerich Society of Lahaul. By 2017, he was instrumental in reconstructing the summer study of the famous Russian Orientalist, philosopher, painter, and explorer Nicholas Roerich in Kyelong (originally built in 1930–32 and destroyed by a snowstorm in 2012).

Dorje wrote a number of articles in Hindi and Tibetan. Over the years, he guided numerous researchers doing research in the Kullu and the Lahaul and Spiti districts. This list includes, among others, the Tibetologists John Vincent Bellezza and Tashi Tsering, and the anthropologist Himika Bhattacharya. He spoke at many scholarly and literary seminars and at other cultural events in Kullu. He was also occasionally sought by the media for comments over current developments in the Kullu valley.

In 2012, Dorje served as the vice-president of the Bharatiya Itihaas Sankalan Samiti in Himachal Pradesh.

In 2018, Dorje was appointed to the General Council of the Himachal Pradesh Academy as the representative for the Lahaul and Spiti district.

=== Role in Atal Tunnel construction ===
Over 1999–2000, alongside fellow Lahauli Tashi Dawa (aka 'Gopal Arjun'), Tshering Dorje played a key role in floating the idea of constructing a tunnel below the Rohtang Pass to then-Prime Minister Atal Bihari Vajpayee. This would enable round-the-year road access to the Lahaul valley, which otherwise got cut-off from road access for up to six months every year due to the closure of the Rohtang Pass by snows. Dawa and Dorje were part of a delegation of four from Himachal that met PM Vajpayee several times over two years to push their proposal to get a tunnel made under the pass. This eventually culminated in the construction of the Atal Tunnel, which opened in October 2020.

=== Others ===
- In the early 1960s, Dorje served as a Bhoti teacher and a close aid to Manohar Singh Gill, when the latter was serving as the Deputy Commissioner of Lahaul and Spiti district. Gill acknowledges that Dorje played a central role in the shaping of his book Himalayan Wonderland. Over the decades, Dorje and M.S. Gill became close friends.
- Since the mid-1960s, Dorje had been a close friend of the Buddhist nun Tenzin Palmo. He had been the person who brought supplies once every six months to her cave high up in Lahaul, while she was on her strict three-years long meditation retreat, as recounted in the book Cave in the Snow.
- Dorje was also known to be close to the 14th Dalai Lama.
- The British Museum in London has a photograph of Tshering Dorje's home in Lahaul, taken by Christina Noble in 1974.
- Dorje features in a 2011 article of the Tricycle magazine, related to an anecdote involving the American philosopher Dan Wikler's travels in the Himalayas.

== Bibliography ==
- Dorje, Tshering. (2005). 'Punan ki boli mein ek geet'. Kunzom Magazine, Volume 1 (pp. 35–36).
- Dorje, Tshering. (2017). 'Roerich in Lahoul (Lahul)'.
