= Kardang =

- village
- Location in Himachal Pradesh, India Kardang (India)
- Coordinates: 32°34′0″N 77°1′9″E
- Country: India
- State: Himachal Pradesh

Languages
  - Official: Hindi
- Time zone: UTC+5:30 (IST)
- Vehicle registration: HP

Kardang is a village in the Lahaul region of Himachal Pradesh, India. It is 5 km away from Keylong. It was once the capital of Lahaul and has the biggest monastery of the area, situated on the left bank of the river Bhaga. The Drukpa Kagyu Kardang Monastery was founded about 900 years ago and was renovated by Lama Norbu in 1912. Gozzangwa Monastery is also nearby.

== See also ==
- Lahaul and Spiti district
