= Kardang Monastery =

Tibetan Buddhist monastery in Kardang, Himachal Pradesh, India

- Location within India

Religion
- Affiliation: Tibetan Buddhism
- Sect: Drukpa

Location
- Location: Kardang, Lahul and Spiti, Himachal Pradesh, India
- Country: India
- Interactive map of Kardang Monastery
- Coordinates: 32.563°N 77.022°E

Architecture
- Established: 12th century

Kardang Monastery or Gompa is a famous Drukpa Lineage monastery, and is the most important monastery in the Lahaul valley, India. The associated village of Kardang was once the capital of Lahaul.

The monastery is a huge white building bedecked with prayer flags It is situated on a ridge below the 15,000 foot (4,572 metres) Rangcha peak, at an altitude of 3,500m on the left bank of the Bhaga River, facing the town of Keylong, about 8 km away. Kardang is well connected by the road via the Tandi bridge which is about 14 km from Keylong. The monastery was featured on the 7 November 2010 episode of the History Channel TV series IRT Deadliest Roads, where trucker Rick Yemm delivered a large golden Buddha statue to the monastery and was greeted by the monastery's head, Lama Paljor Larje.

== History ==
The monastery is believed to have been built in the 12th century and houses a large library of Buddhist literature, including the Kangyur and Tangyur scriptures in the Bhotia or Sherpa language. There is also a good collection of fine thankas, musical instruments such as lutes, drums, horns, as well as old weapons. There are colourful frescoes and murals.

The monastery was in ruins until it was renovated in 1912 CE by Lama Norbu Rinpoche (died 1952), who, with Lama Kunga, turned it into "a proper educational and training establishment."

In the first room is a 4-foot (1.23 metres) high silver chaitya or chorten preserving the skull and ashes of Lama Norbu.To the right of it are statues of Padmasambhava and Tara (Devi), and in the back, one of Tagden Shakyashree, guru of Lama Kunga. 103 volumes of the Kangyur are kept here, while behind are 64 tantra books on various subjects. The second room is the main Prayer Hall with an eleven-headed statue of Avalokitesvara. On a high pedestal at the right are some of Lama Norbu's castoff garments and with a skull in front. In the third room is a six-foot wooden prayer wheel with a brass bell on it. There are now about thirty monks and nuns (chomos) in the monastery, and two British nuns have studied, meditated, and been initiated in recent years.

The monks and nuns have equal rights, and the monks have permission to marry. The monks spend the summer with their families working their fields, in the winter they return to the monastery. There is a huge prayer drum in the monastery with the sacred six-syllable mantra, Om mani padme hum, written a million times on strips of paper. It also has a Narbo as its head lama.

Because the monastery is on the southern bank of the Bhaga River, it gets very little sun, while Keylong on the opposite side gets far more as it is facing south. Because of this the Moravian Christian mission, which was established here in 1857, was later moved across the river to Keylong.

== Modern story by monastery head Lama Paljor Larje ==
The old monastery temple was fully destroyed by rain at 1998. The new temple was rebuilt at 1999–2009 by present monastery head Lama Paljor. The previous monastery head - Lama Apo rinponche came from Tibet in about 1959. He became monastery head in 1970. Lama Paljor larje was his disciple since he was 13 years old. Khantse rimponche led the monastery when Apo rimponche died in 1981. Lama Paljor Larje leads the monastery from 1999 onwards.

The new temple has two floors. Each floor has one room.

The ground floor is place for laymen. It has a number of very old statues and paintings. When a layman enters the temple he sees three main statues on the front: Buddha Shakjamuni statue on the middle, Buddha Vajradhara on the left and Buddha Padmasambhava on the right. To the right side of the main statues the laymen may see the statues of:

1. Buddha Amitabha
2. Tara
3. Maha sidha (siddha) Shakya Shri
4. Marpa - great buddhist text translator
5. Yogin Malarepa
6. Gampopa
7. Lama Norbu rinpoche - both statue and stupa with his relic

There are some of statues on the right side:

1. Buddha Avalokiteshvara
2. Heruka deity
3. Vajrayogini
4. Maha sidha (siddha) Shakya Shri
5. Yunjin rinpoche
6. Kunga rinpoche - both statue and stupa
7. Apo rinpoche - stupa, previous monastery head

Painting The temple has a number of old cloth paintings: Tibetian tradition painting, Kalachakra deity painting, Buddha Jataka, Melorepa stories etc. Molarepa story is estimated as 400 years old painting.

The ground floor ceiling has a number of traditional painting compositions. The Guru-yoga mandala on the right and Chakrasambara mandala on the left surround the Buddha Akshobhya figure. This painting as well as all the new paintings inside and outside the temple were made by Lama Paljaor himself, who is a master of traditional thangka painting.

The monastery has a number of very old books and commentaries.

== Bibliography ==
- Handa, O. C. (1987). Buddhist Monasteries in Himachal Pradesh. New Delhi: Indus Publishing Company. ISBN 81-85182-03-5.
- Francke, A. H. (1914). Antiquities of Indian Tibet. Two Volumes. Calcutta. 1972 reprint: S. Chand, New Delhi.
- Maitra, Kiranshankar (2002). The Enchanting Himalayas: A Pilgrimage to Lahul-Spiti. Mittal Publications. ISBN 81-7099-855-7..
