= Atal Tunnel =

Highway tunnel of the Himalayas

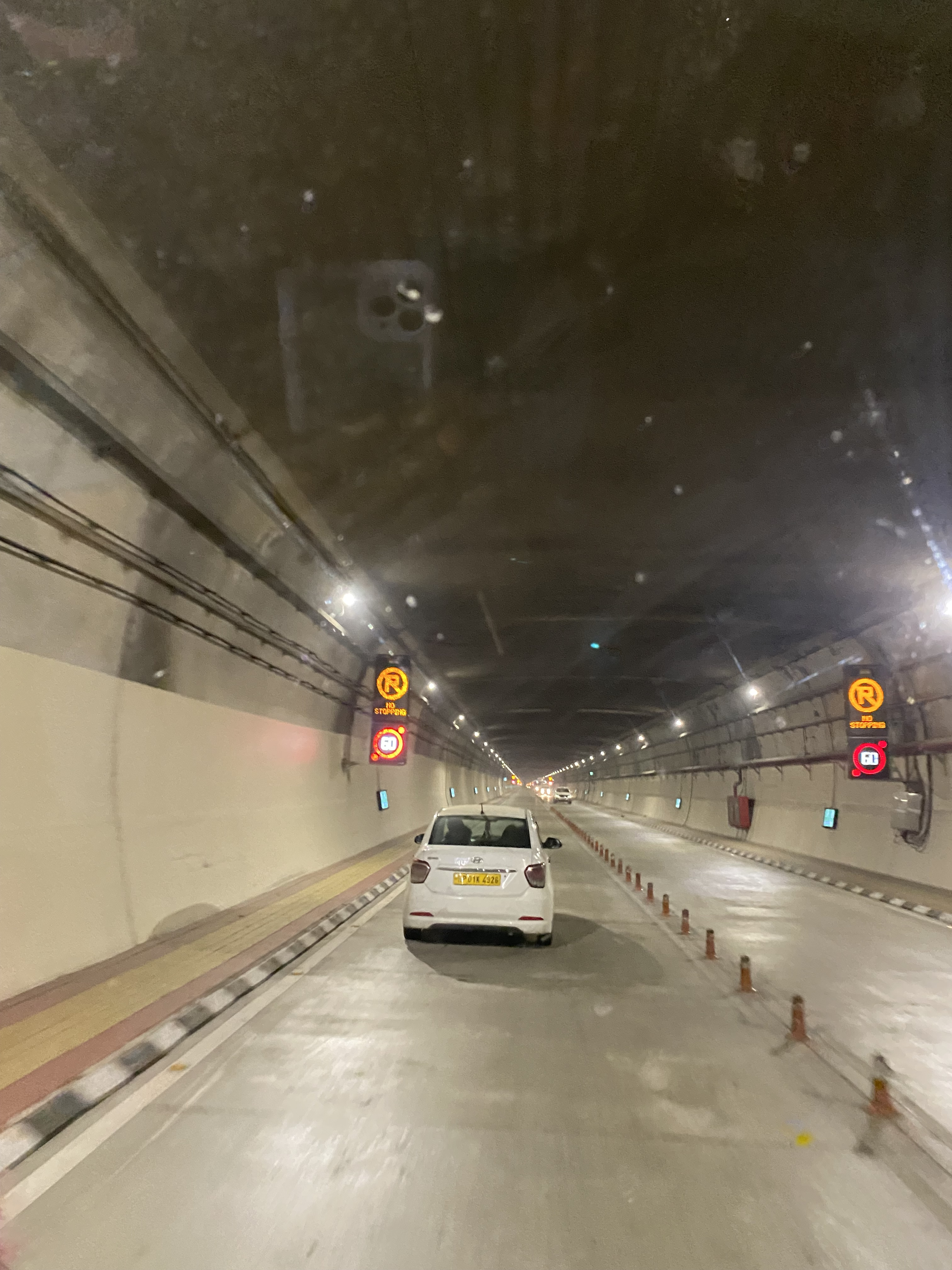
- Atal Tunnel during winter
- Interactive map of Atal Tunnel

Overview
- Location: Himachal Pradesh, India
- Coordinates: 32.401270°N 77.148335°E
- Status: Active
- Route: NH 3
- Crosses: Rohtang Pass

Operation
- Work began: May 2010
- Opened: 4 October 2020
- Operator: Border Roads Organisation
- Traffic: Automotive

Technical
- Length: 9.02 kilometres (5.60 mi)
- No. of lanes: Two (one in each direction)
- Operating speed: 40–60 km/h (25–37 mph)
- Width: 10 metres (33 ft)
- marvels.bro.gov.in/AtalTunnel

Atal Tunnel (Hindi: अटल सुरंग) is a 9.02-kilometre-long (5.60 mi) road tunnel connecting Manali and Keylong, thus helping in bypassing the Rohtang Pass, Himachal Pradesh in the eastern Pir Panjal range of the Himalayas. It carries two lanes of National Highway 3 and is the longest highway single-tube tunnel above 10,000 feet (3,048 m) in the world. It is named after the former Prime Minister of India, Atal Bihari Vajpayee. There are other tunnels under-construction on this NH3 Leh-Manali Highway.

The tunnel reduces the travel time and overall distance between Manali and Keylong on the way to Leh. The route, which previously went through Gramphu, was 116 km (72.1 mi) long and took 5 to 6 hours in good conditions. The new route via the tunnel brings down the total distance travelled to 71 km (44.1 mi) which can be covered in about 2 hours, a reduction of around 3 to 4 hours when compared to the earlier route. Moreover, the tunnel bypasses most of the sites that were prone to road blockades, avalanches, and traffic snarls, especially during winters.

== History ==
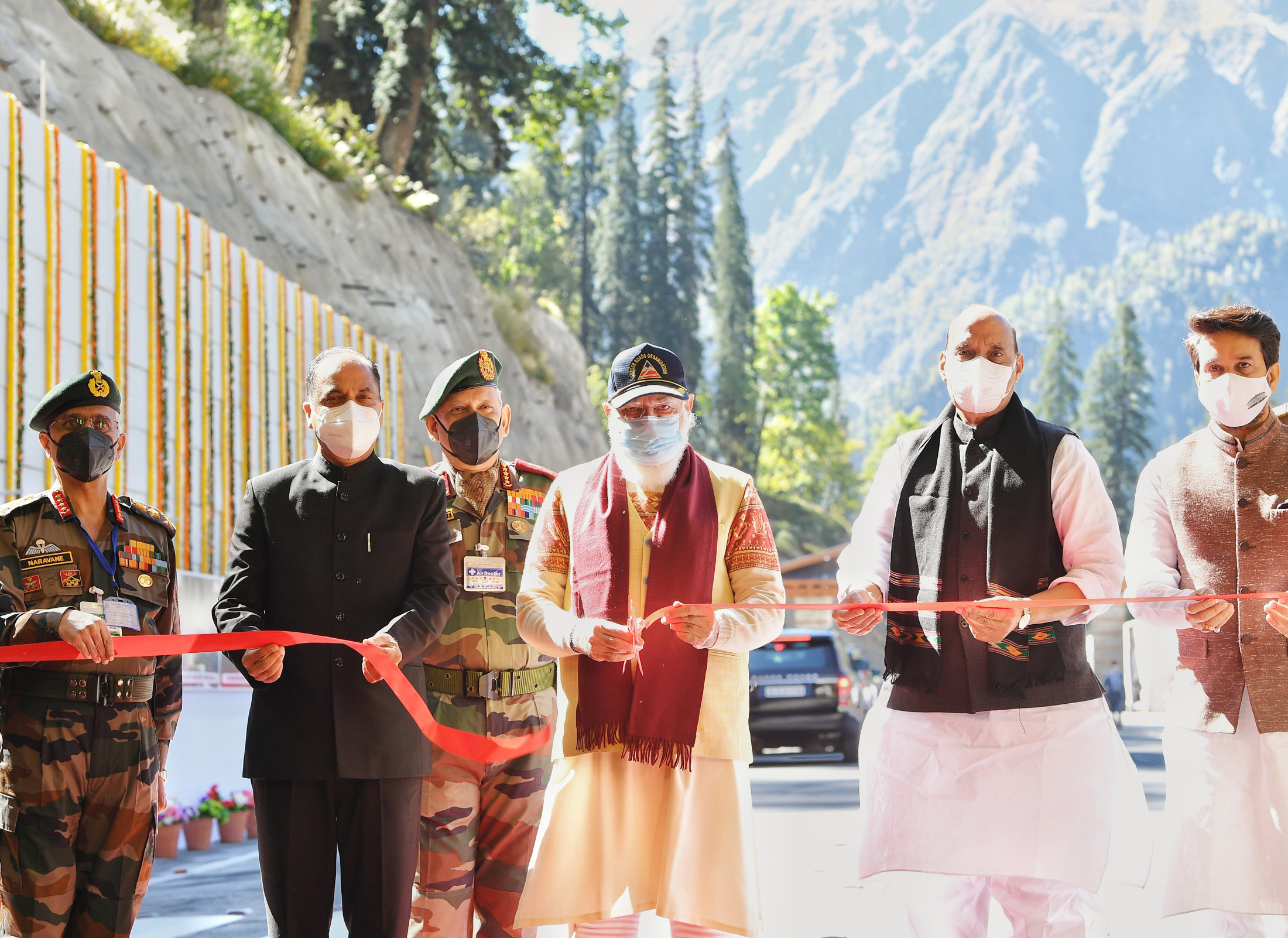
Prime Minister Narendra Modi inaugurating the Atal Tunnel in Manali, Himachal Pradesh on 3 October 2020. Along with Rajnath Singh, Jai Ram Thakur and Bipin Rawat

The Moravian Mission first talked about the possibility of a tunnel through Rohtang Pass to reach Lahaul in 1860.

The proposal for the construction of a tunnel across Rohtang Pass was first conceived in 1942 by Dr. John Bicknell Auden, Geological Survey of India (GSI) who at that time visited this pass intending to divert the water of Chandra river to Beas.

When Atal Bihari Vajpayee became the Prime Minister, locals suggested his childhood friend Arjun Gopal to visit him and to talk about Rohtang Tunnel. Gopal and two companions, Chhering Dorje and Abhay Chand, moved to Delhi. After a year of discussions, Vajpayee went to Lahaul in June 2000 and declared that the Rohtang Tunnel would be constructed. RITES conducted a feasibility study.

In 2000, the project was estimated to cost ₹500 crore and be completed in seven years. On 26 May 2002, the Border Roads Organisation (BRO), a tri-service organisation of the Defence Ministry specialising in road and bridge construction in difficult terrains, headed by Lt. Gen. Prakash Suri, PVSM, was put in charge of construction. The approach road to the tunnel entrance was inaugurated by Atal Bihari Vajpayee.

However the project did not move beyond the tree-felling stage by May 2003. By December 2004, the cost estimate had grown to ₹900 crore. In May 2007, the government of Manmohan Singh awarded the contract to SMEC and the completion date was revised to 2014. However, there was no progress for the next three years, until May 2010.

Finally, the Cabinet Committee on Security in UPA government cleared the Rohtang Tunnel Project. The work was awarded to a joint venture of Afcons Infrastructure, an Indian construction company of Shapoorji Pallonji Group, and Strabag, Austria, in September 2009. The drilling of the Rohtang Tunnel through the Himalayan ranges began on 28 June 2010 at the South Portal, 25 km (16 mi) north of Manali. Some of the anchoring and slope stabilisation work was subcontracted to Spar Geo Infra Pvt Ltd. Permanent maintenance free earthing system design, supply and installation was sub-contracted to Manav Energy Pvt. Ltd.

Prime Minister Narendra Modi renamed the tunnel as the Atal Tunnel, in honour of Shree Atal Bihari Vajpayee, on 25 December 2019, Vajpayee's birthday.

The Atal Tunnel has been planned to ensure an all-seasons, all-weather road route to strategically important areas of Ladakh and the remote Lahaul-Spiti valley. However, the tunnel will provide this connectivity only up to Darcha, north of Keylong in the Lahaul region of Himachal Pradesh. Connectivity to Ladakh will require more tunnels: either at Shikun La, or at the passes located on the present Leh-Manali road. Director General Border Roads Lt Gen Rajeev Chaudhry, VSM has initiated plans for construction of tunnel at Shinkula.

== Timeline ==
Total length of tunnel is 9.02 km.

- The project was announced by the then Prime Minister Atal Bihari Vajpayee on 3 June 2000. The work was entrusted to BRO on 6 May 2002.
- The foundation stone of the project was laid on 28 June 2010 by Sonia Gandhi in her capacity as the Chairperson of National Advisory Council.
- As of June 2012, two years after the start of the project, 3.5 km of the tunnel digging had been completed.
- Only a little progress was made in the next one year due to heavy ingress of water at serri nullah fault zone, that required constant dewatering and slowed the digging and blasting to a crawl.
- As of October 2013, a little more than 4 km of the tunnel had been dug. However, about 30 m portion of the roof of the tunnel collapsed towards the north portal on 17 October 2013 and the digging had to be stopped.
- As of September 2014, 4.4 km of the tunnel, i.e., half of 8.8 km planned length had been dug.
- As of December 2016, 7.6 km of the tunnel digging had been completed. Excavation was expected to be completed in 2017, with opening in the second half of 2019.
- As on 13 October 2017 both ends of the tunnel met. The Defence Minister, Nirmala Sitharaman, visited the site on 15 October 2017.
- As on 22 November 2017, it was decided to allow patients to be carried through the under-construction tunnel only in the gravest of emergency when the helicopter service was not available and not to allow civilians to enter the tunnel before completion due to risks of falling rocks, lack of oxygen in the tunnel as ventilation system was yet to be installed, etc. and likely interruption in construction work due to presence of civilians.
- Sep 2018: the tunnel was used for evacuation of people stranded in Lahaul after sudden spell of bad weather blocked Rohtang La due to snowfall.
- Nov 2019: Bus service trial started through the yet-incomplete tunnel on 17 November 2019. A Himachal Road Transport Corporation bus carrying 44 passengers entered tunnel from the south portal and the passengers alighted at the north portal. The bus service operated for next five winter months for residents of Lahaul and Spiti valleys. Private vehicles were not allowed through the tunnel.
- Dec 2019: On 25 December the tunnel, which was known as Rohtang tunnel till then, was officially renamed as the Atal Tunnel.
- Sept 2020: 100% completion of project.
- Oct 2020: The tunnel was inaugurated by the Prime Minister, Narendra Modi on 3 October 2020, in the presence of Minister of Defence, Rajnath Singh and Chief Minister of Himachal Pradesh, Jai Ram Thakur and Minister of State for Finance, Anurag Thakur.
- Mar 2022: Minister of Defence Shri Rajnath Singh dedicated website https://marvels.bro.gov.in dedicated to the Nation which will felicitate Citizens and students across the Country to visit the Tunnel.

== Challenges ==
The most challenging task was to continue the excavation during heavy snowfall in winter. Excavation for tunnelling was done from both ends. However, as Rohtang pass closes during the winter, the north portal was not accessible during winter and the excavation was being done only from the south portal in winters. Only about one-fourth of the entire tunnel was excavated from the north end and three-fourths was excavated from the south end. There were more than 46 avalanche sites on approaches to the tunnel.

Other challenges to the progress of the tunnel included difficulties in disposing of the more than 800,000 m^{3} of excavated rock and soil, heavy ingress of water (as much as 3,000,000 litres per day in June 2012) that required constant dewatering and costlier treatment, and unstable rocks that slowed blasting and digging. The progress of excavation was regularly slowed from 5 metres per day to just half a metre a day. A cloud-burst and flash flood on 8 August 2003 killed 42 labourers who were building the temporary access road. Questions were also raised on the impact of cutting down more than 700 trees on the ecology.

== Specifications ==
The tunnel is intended to create an all-weather route to Leh and Lahaul and Spiti valleys in Himachal Pradesh.

Salient features of the Atal Tunnel are as follows:

- Length: 9.02 km (5.6 mi)
- Shape (cross-section) of Tunnel: Horseshoe
- Finished width: 10.00 m (32.8 ft) at road level. (8m pavement and 1m footpath on both sides)
- General altitude of the tunnel: 3,000–3,100 m or 9,840–10,170 ft
- Designated vehicular speed: 80 km/h (50 mph)
- Geology of tunnelling media: Uniformly dipping alternate sequence of quartzites, quartzitic schists, quartz-diolite-schist with thin bands.
- Tunnel boring machines were not used because of the inability to see inside the mountain, instead blasting and digging used to build the tunnel.
- Temperature variation in the area: 25–30 °C (77–86 °F) during May–June, −30 to −20 °C (−22 to −4 °F) during Dec–Jan.
- Overburden: Maximum 1,900 metres (6,230 ft), average more than 600 m (1,970 ft)
- Construction technique: Drill & Blast with NATM
- Support system: Fibre-reinforced concrete (100–300mm or 0–10 inch thick) combined with rock bolt (26.50mm dia, 5,000–9,000mm or 200–350 inch long) has been used as the principal support system.
- Tunnel ventilation: Semi-transverse system of ventilation.
- A 2.25 m high and 3.6 m wide emergency tunnel is integrated in the tunnel cross-section beneath the main carriageway.

The following parameters have been set in design:

- (a) Upper tolerance limit for concentration – 150ppm
- (b) Visibility factor – 0.009/m
- (c) Vehicles

- (i) Cars – 3000 Nos.
- (ii Trucks – 1500 Nos.

- (d) Peak hour traffic – 337.50 PCUs
- (e) Design vehicular speed in Tunnel

- (i) Maximum Speed – 80 km/h (50 mph)
- (ii) Minimum Speed – 30 km/h (19 mph)

Project Cost : Approximately ₹3,200 crore

== Safety measures ==
The tunnel was built using the New Austrian tunnelling method and has been equipped with a semi-transverse ventilation system, where large fans separately circulate air throughout the tunnel. A 2.250 m tall and 3.6 m wide emergency tunnel has been integrated into the tunnel cross-section beneath the main carriageway for evacuation during emergencies.

Fires inside the tunnel will be controlled within an area of 200 metres and fire hydrants are provided at specific locations throughout the tunnel. The tunnel also has a public announcement system to make important announcements in emergency situations for which loudspeakers are installed at regular intervals.

Heavy snowfall in the Rohtang Pass area is a major concern, especially on the approach roads to the main tunnel. To prevent any damage to the roads and to ensure the safety of the roads and tunnel users alike, avalanche control structures have been constructed. Since the Atal tunnel is likely to witness heavy traffic, CCTV cameras are placed at regular intervals in the tunnel which are connected to two monitoring rooms on both ends of the tunnel for vehicular management and pollution monitoring. Pollution sensors continuously monitor the air quality in the tunnel and if the air quality in the tunnel is below the desired level, fresh air is injected into the tunnel via two heavy duty fans on each side of the tunnel.

== Gallery ==
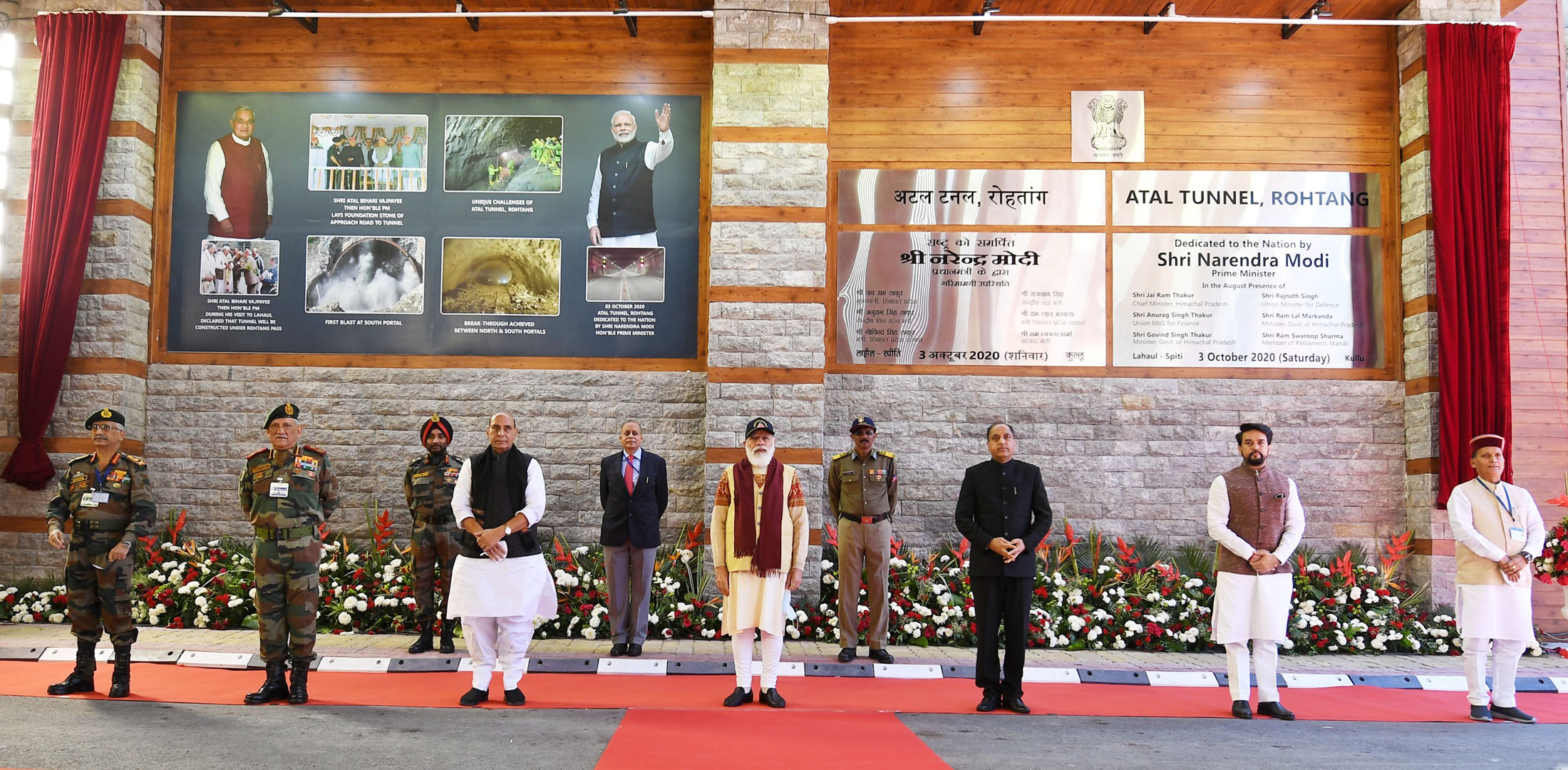
Prime Minister Narendra Modi and other dignitaries after the inauguration of the Atal Tunnel.

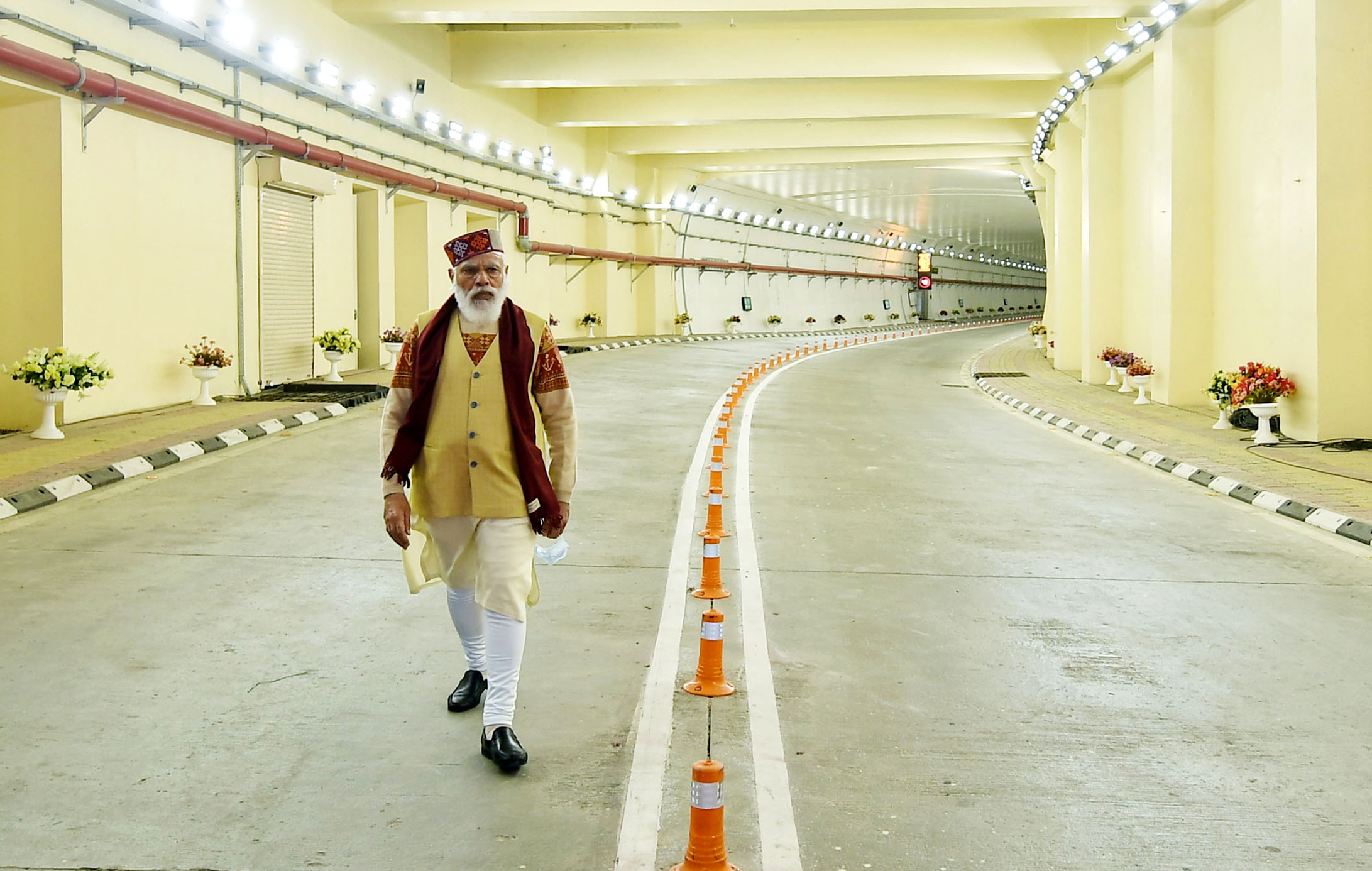
Prime Minister Narendra Modi is walking through the roads of the tunnel after its inauguration.

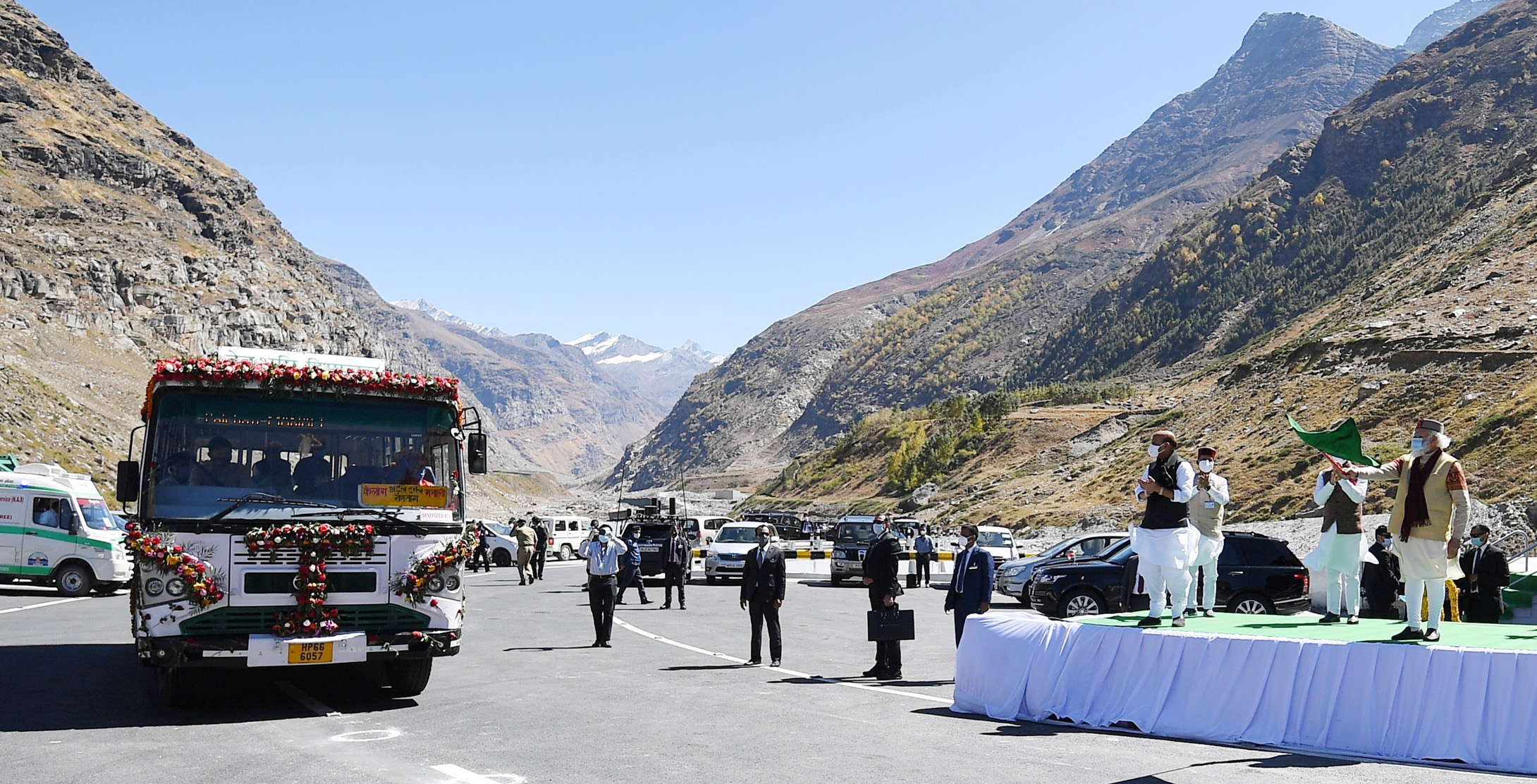
Prime Minister Narendra Modi flags off a bus from Manali after inaugurating the Atal Tunnel.

== See also ==
- Bhanupli–Leh line, along this highway NH3
- India-China Border Roads
- Tunnels in North West India
- Lists of tunnels
