= Kyelang =

Town in Himachal Pradesh, India

- Town
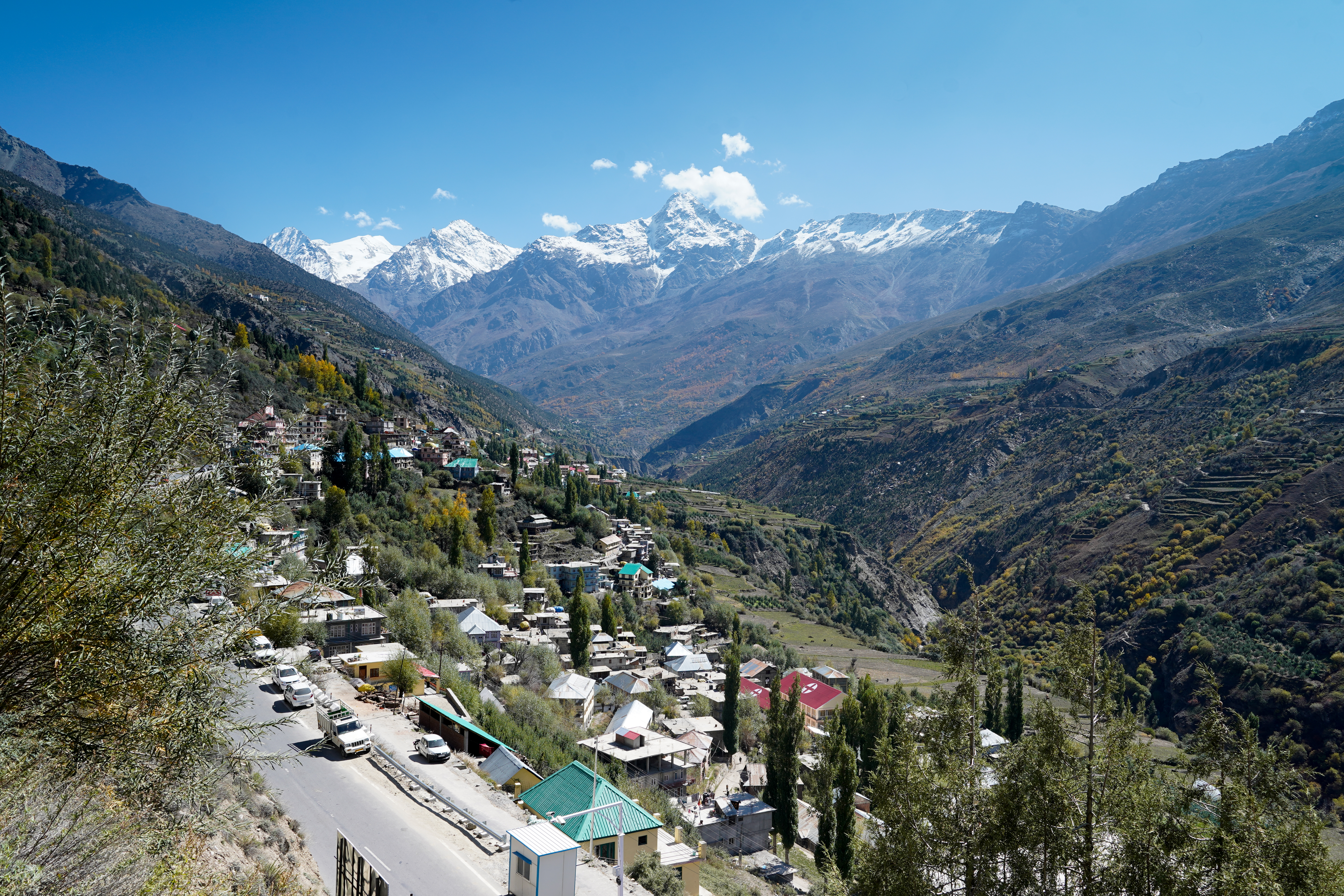
- East Kyelang

- Location within Himachal Pradesh Location within India
- Coordinates: 32°34′15″N 77°01′54″E
- Country: India
- State: Himachal Pradesh
- District: Lahaul and Spiti
- Elevation: 3,080 m (10,100 ft)

Population
  - Total: 1,150

Languages
  - Official: Hindi
  - Native: Lahuli–Spiti languages
- Time zone: UTC+5:30 (IST)
- Vehicle registration: HP-42

Kyelang (also spelled Keylong) is a town and the administrative centre of the Lahaul and Spiti district in the Indian state of Himachal Pradesh, 71 kilometres (44 mi) north of Manali via Atal Tunnel and 120 km (75 mi) from the Indo-Tibetan border. It is located along the Manali-Leh Highway and on the banks of the Bhaga River. Kyelang lies about 7 km (4 1/2 mi) northeast of where the Chenab Valley splits into the Chandra Valley and Bhaga Valley.

== Climate ==
Kyelang has a subalpine climate (Köppen Dfc), bordering upon an alpine climate (ETH) with frigid, snowy winters and cool summers. As it lies south of the main Himalaya range, snowfall is much heavier than in arid Spiti or Ladakh.

Climate data for Kyelang (Only extremes 1961–Present, rainfall 1951–2000)
Month	Jan	Feb	Mar	Apr	May	Jun	Jul	Aug	Sep	Oct	Nov	Dec	Year
Record high °C (°F)	6.8 (44.2)	10.0 (50.0)	13.9 (57.0)	23.1 (73.6)	25.7 (78.3)	30.8 (87.4)	31.4 (88.5)	31.5 (88.7)	26.3 (79.3)	23.7 (74.7)	16.2 (61.2)	8.5 (47.3)	31.5 (88.7)
Record low °C (°F)	−30 (−22)	−28 (−18)	−20 (−4)	−15 (5)	−7 (19)	−5 (23)	−1 (30)	−2 (28)	−4 (25)	−13 (9)	−21 (−6)	−25 (−13)	−30 (−22)
Average precipitation mm (inches)	78.0 (3.07)	92.8 (3.65)	141.1 (5.56)	88.2 (3.47)	71.1 (2.80)	25.8 (1.02)	60.3 (2.37)	42.1 (1.66)	55.5 (2.19)	24.4 (0.96)	25.8 (1.02)	35.3 (1.39)	740.4 (29.15)
Average precipitation days (≥ 2.5 mm)	6.3	5.9	8.7	6.5	5.4	2.2	5.6	4.3	3.5	2.0	1.6	3.1	55.1
Average relative humidity (%) (at 08:30 IST)	74	76	75	66	62	62	74	77	64	52	54	67	67
Source: India Meteorological Department

== Access ==
Kyelang is accessible from Manali via the Manali-Leh Highway, a part of NH21. It is located about 71 km (44 mi) north of Manali at an altitude of 3,080 m (10,100 ft) and used to remain cut off from the outside world for six months from late October to mid-May due to heavy snowfall at Rohtang pass until the opening of Atal Tunnel in October 2020. Keylang is now accessible year round, but road blocks can occur in winter lasting several days. The peak travel season is during May–June and October, when a lot of tourists visit Rohtang pass and Atal tunnel. There are many buses in summer from Kulu and Manali.

The Manali to Atal tunnel south portal is 25.6 km via Solang valley road. The length of Atal tunnel up to north portal is 9 km. From the north portal one has to cross a bridge on the Chandra river and turn left to go to Sissu 7 km (4.3 mi) away, then continue to Tandi 22 km (14 mi) away, and then turn right to reach Keylong.

=== Atal tunnel ===
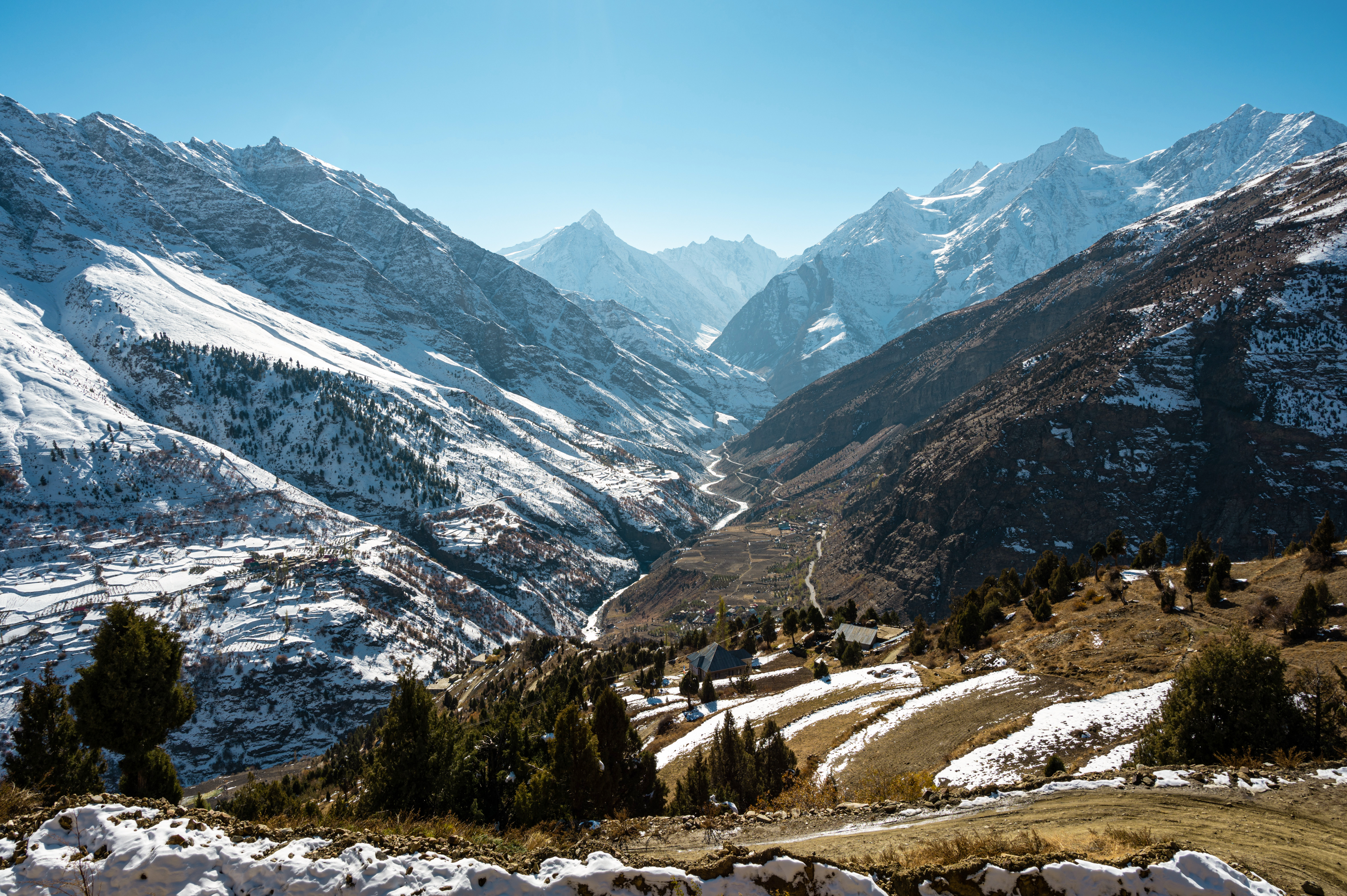
View of the Bhaga Valley from Shashur Monastery

Due to the military significance of the Leh-Manali highway and the need to keep it open for the entire year, the Indian government began building the $320 million 9 km (5.6 mi) long horseshoe shaped Atal Tunnel project in 2010 to bypass Rohtang pass to create a much safer and faster year-round link to Kyelang. The tunnel is now open for traffic and it has shortened the distance between Manali and Keylang by 45 km (28 mi), and the travel time from Manali to Keylang is about 2 hrs now. While it used to take 4 to 6 hours to ascend, negotiate, and descend the Rohtang pass, it takes only about 15 minutes to travel through the Atal tunnel.

Another way to access the area is via air to Kullu and then travelling on the Leh-Manali highway to Kyelang.

=== Railway ===
Bilaspur will be a station on the under-construction Bhanupli–Leh line. Northern Railway has planned to construct 489 km (304 mi) long Broad Gauge (BG) Railway Line to connect Bhanupli near Anandpur Sahib with Leh. The proposed line will have India's longest Railway tunnel at Kyelang. The length of Keylong Tunnel will be 21.15 km (13 mi; 69,390 ft) long. The Leh railway line will also have India's and the world's highest railway station at Tanglang La, a whopping 5,359 m (17,582 ft) above sea level.

== Sights and festivals ==
Kyelang faces the famous Kardang Monastery, the largest and most important monastery in Lahaul, of the Drukpa sect of Tibetan Buddhism, which is on a slope across the river from Keylong.

Sights near Kyelang include the Kardang, Shasur, and Tayul monasteries, all within a few kilometres of Kyelang. There is also a small temple dedicated to the local deity Kelang Wazir in the house of Shri Nawang Dorje that may be visited upon arrangement.

The annual Lahaul Festival is held here each July with a big, busy market and a number of cultural activities.

== Tourism ==
Kyelang is the district headquarters of Lahaul and Spiti district and is home to most of the government offices and facilities in Lahaul. It hosts a regular bazaar.

There are some tourist facilities including a Circuit House, a Public Works Department (PWD) Rest House, a Sainik (Army) Rest House, a Tourist Bungalow, and a number of small hotels.

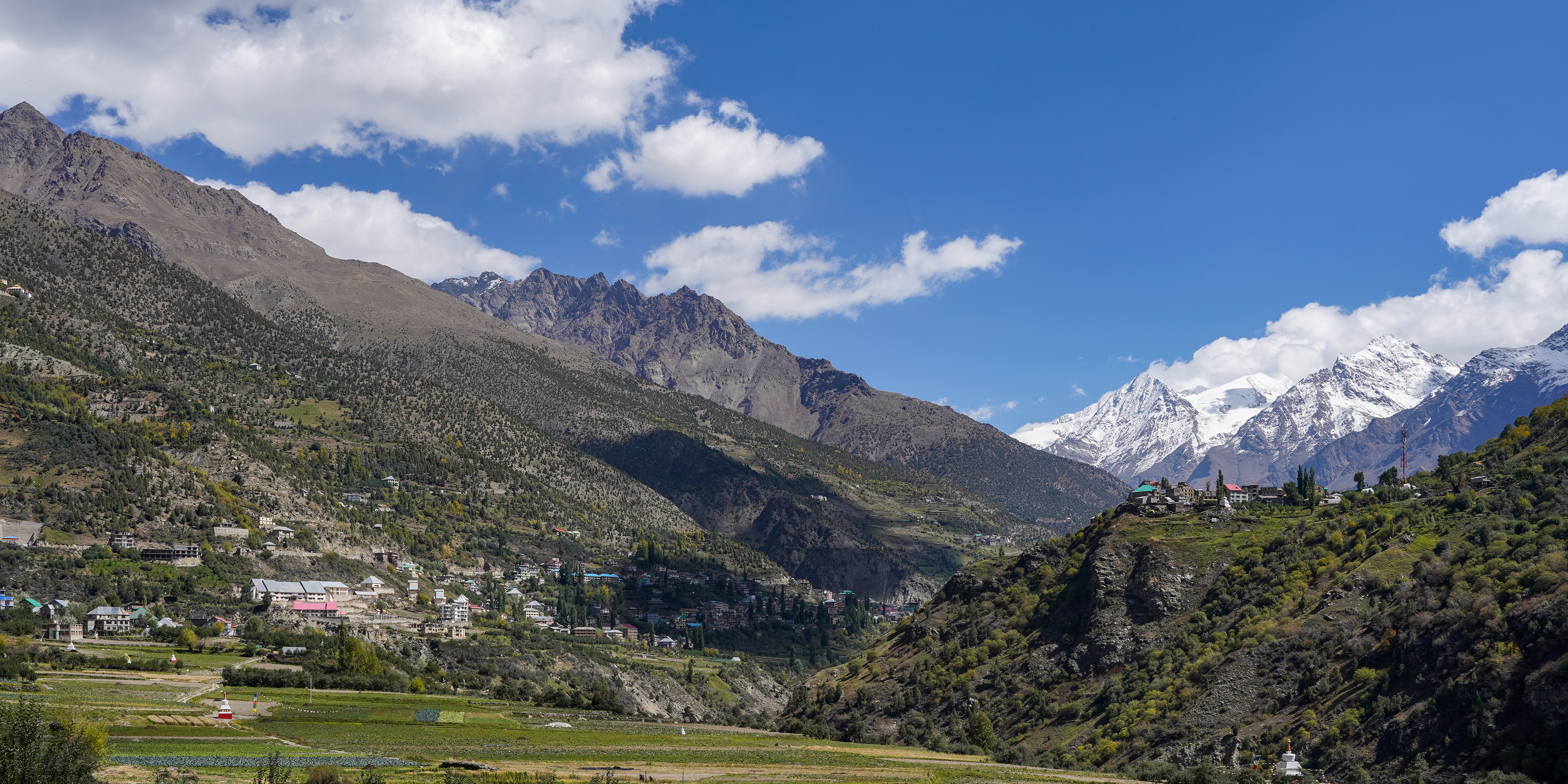
Keylong and its surroundings, view from Belling (downstream, to the west)
