= Bhanupli–Leh line =

Proposed high elevation railway track in Himachal Pradesh and Ladakh

Overview
- Status: Final Location Survey & DPR completed; Land acquisition in progress; Bhanupli-Bilaspur section under construction
- Locale: Punjab, Himachal Pradesh and Ladakh, India
- Termini: Bhanupli, Punjab; Leh, Ladakh
- Website: http://www.indianrailways.gov.in

Service
- Services: Bhanupli–Bilaspur–Sundernagar–Kullu–Manali–Keylong–Leh

Technical
- Line length: 489 km (304 mi)
- Track length: 489 km (304 mi)
- Track gauge: 1,676 mm (5 ft 6 in)
- Electrification: In Progress
- Highest elevation: 5,359 m (17,582 ft) at Taglang La

The Bhanupli–Leh line, including 63.1 km (39.2 mi) long Bhanupli-Barmana (Bilaspur) link and the 489 km (304 mi) long Bilaspur-Manali-Leh link, is an under-construction 552.1 km (343.1 mi) long 1,676 mm (5 ft 6 in) wide broad-gauge all-weather electrified railway track connecting Bhanupli in Punjab, to Leh in Ladakh. Passing through seismic zone IV and V at an elevation of 600 m (2,000 ft) to 5,360 m (17,590 ft) above sea level, this geostrategically important track will reduce travel time from New Delhi to Leh to 10 hours, which takes 25–40 hours by road.

== Significance ==
The Bhanupali–Leh line (also referred to as the Bilaspur–Manali–Leh line) is a high-altitude, strategic railway project currently under construction in India. Upon completion, it will connect the plains of Punjab and Himachal Pradesh to the union territory of Ladakh. The line is widely regarded as one of the most challenging engineering feats in the history of global rail transport due to its extreme topography and high-altitude logistics. After the Jammu–Baramulla line, the Bhanupli–Leh line will be the most challenging railway project in Indian Railways due to high mountains, a large number of tunnels, high bridges, and severe cold weather.

=== Geostrategic ===
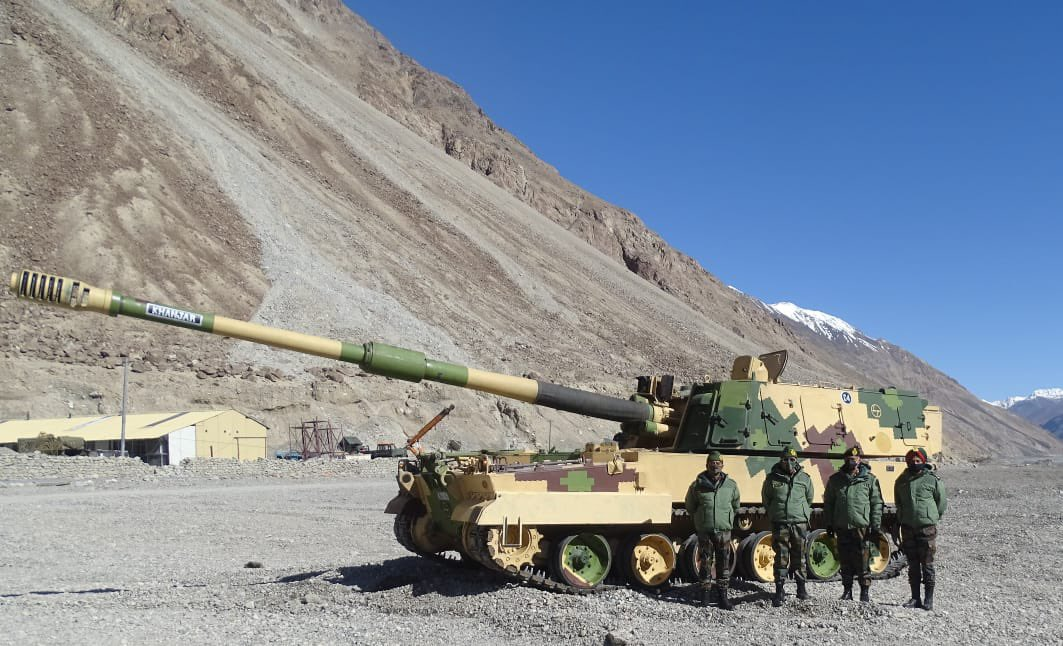
Indian Howitzer K9 self-propelled artillery at Ladakh during 2020–2021 China–India skirmishes.

- National security: The line's primary significance lies in its strategic utility for the Indian Armed Forces. Ladakh shares sensitive borders with both China and Pakistan, and the current road access via the Leh–Manali Highway and Srinagar–Leh Highway is frequently blocked for six months a year due to heavy snowfall at passes like Rohtang and Zoji La.
- Indian military logistics: Five stations along the route - in Lahaul in Himachal; and Karu, Leh, and Sesharthang in Ladakh - feature specialized railway loop lines designed for military troop and equipment movement.
- All-Weather connectivity: The rail link is designed to provide year-round logistics support, enabling the rapid deployment of troops and heavy equipment to the Line of Actual Control (LAC) regardless of weather conditions.

=== Socioeconomic ===
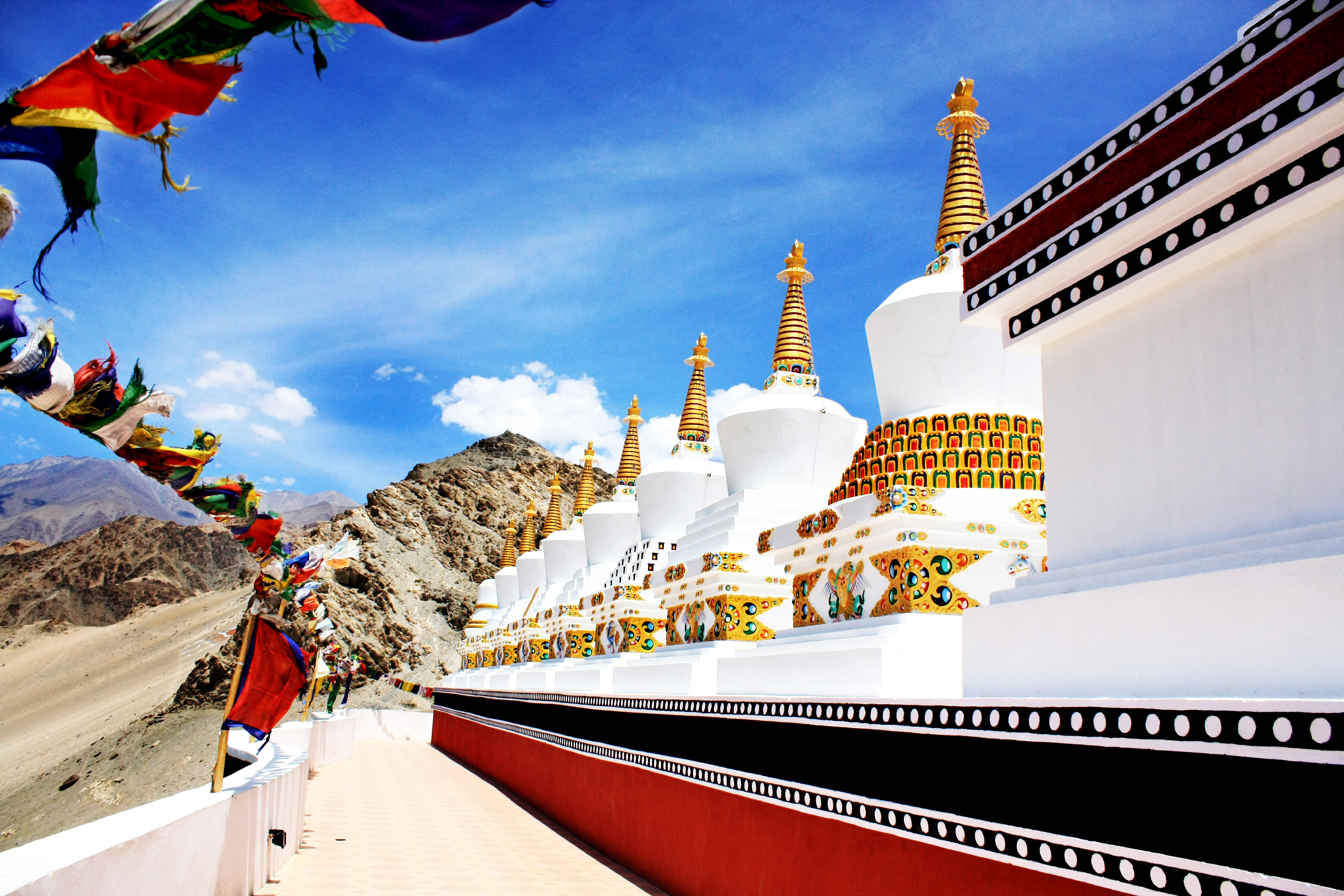
9 Stupas at Thikse Monastery.

Beyond its military utility, the line is expected to transform the economy of the Lahaul and Spiti district and Ladakh:

- Tourism expansion: By providing a safer and more reliable alternative to the treacherous mountain roads, the railway is expected to significantly increase tourist arrivals to Manali, Keylong, and Leh.
- Agricultural access: Local farmers in the Lahaul and Indus valleys will gain direct access to mainland Indian markets for the export of high-value crops like apples, apricots, and buckwheat.
- Price stability: All-weather connectivity will help stabilize the prices of essential commodities in Ladakh, which currently skyrocket during the winter months due to the "landlocked" nature of the region.

=== Engineering ===
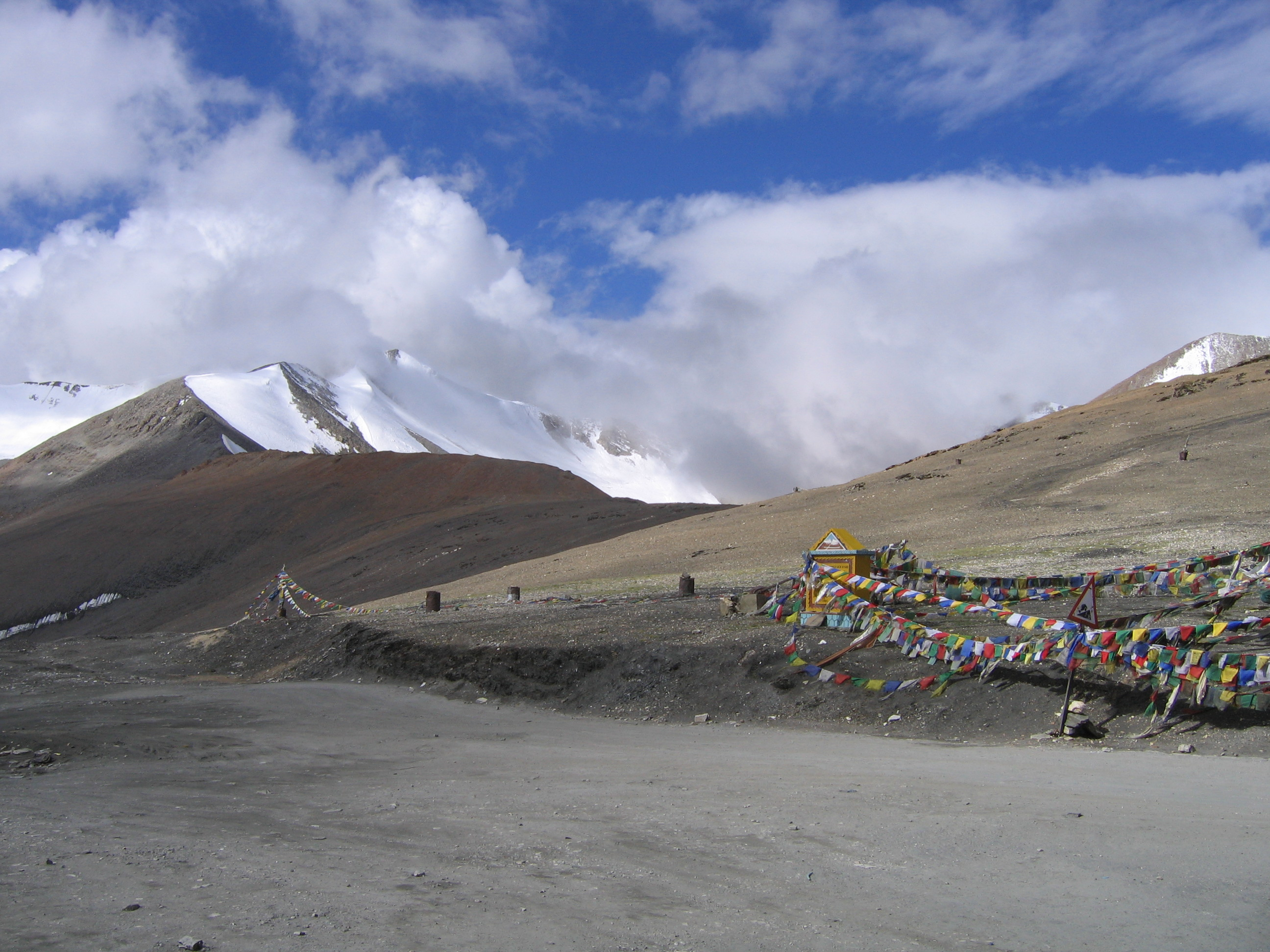
Taglang La, and many other high-altitude mountain passes enroute this line offer several engineering challenges.

The project is set to break several global engineering records:

- World's highest railway: The station at Tengla (near Taglang La) is projected to be the highest in the world at an altitude of approximately 5,359 metres (17,582 ft), surpassing the current record held by the Tanggula railway station in Tibet.
- Subterranean infrastructure: Approximately 50% of the 489 km route will be underground. This includes Keylong railway station, which is designed to be India's first station built entirely inside a tunnel.
- Tunnels and viaducts: The line includes 27 km of continuous tunneling and numerous high-altitude viaducts to bridge deep Himalayan gorges.
- Environmental and geological challenges: The project faces scrutiny regarding its environmental footprint in the fragile Himalayas. The route passes through high-seismic zones and areas prone to flash floods and landslides. Construction requires advanced seismic bracing and specialized drainage systems to mitigate the risk of tunnel collapses.

== Details ==
=== Route ===
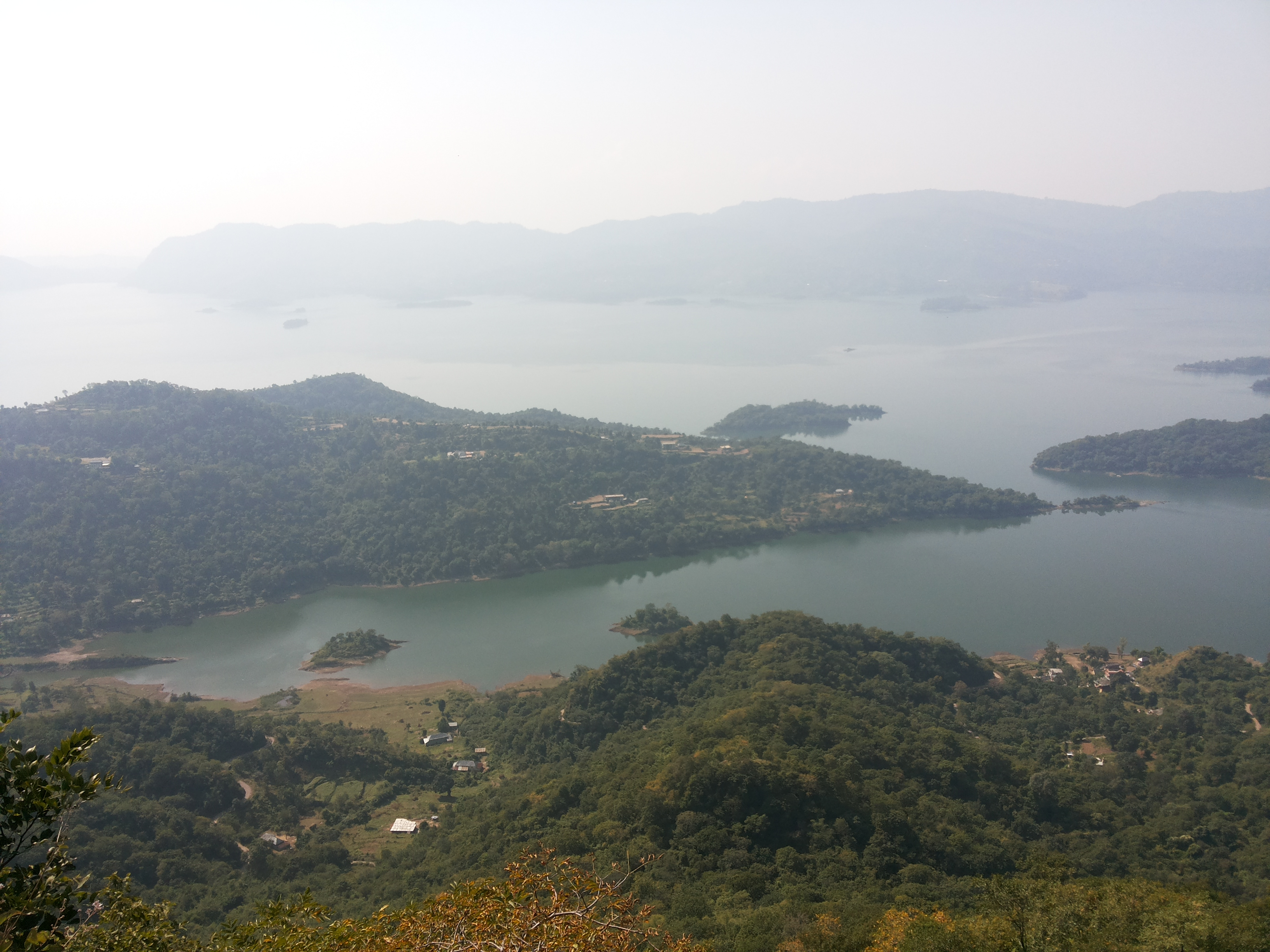
Gobind Sagar Reservoir in Bilaspur formed by the Bhakra Dam on the Sutlej river.

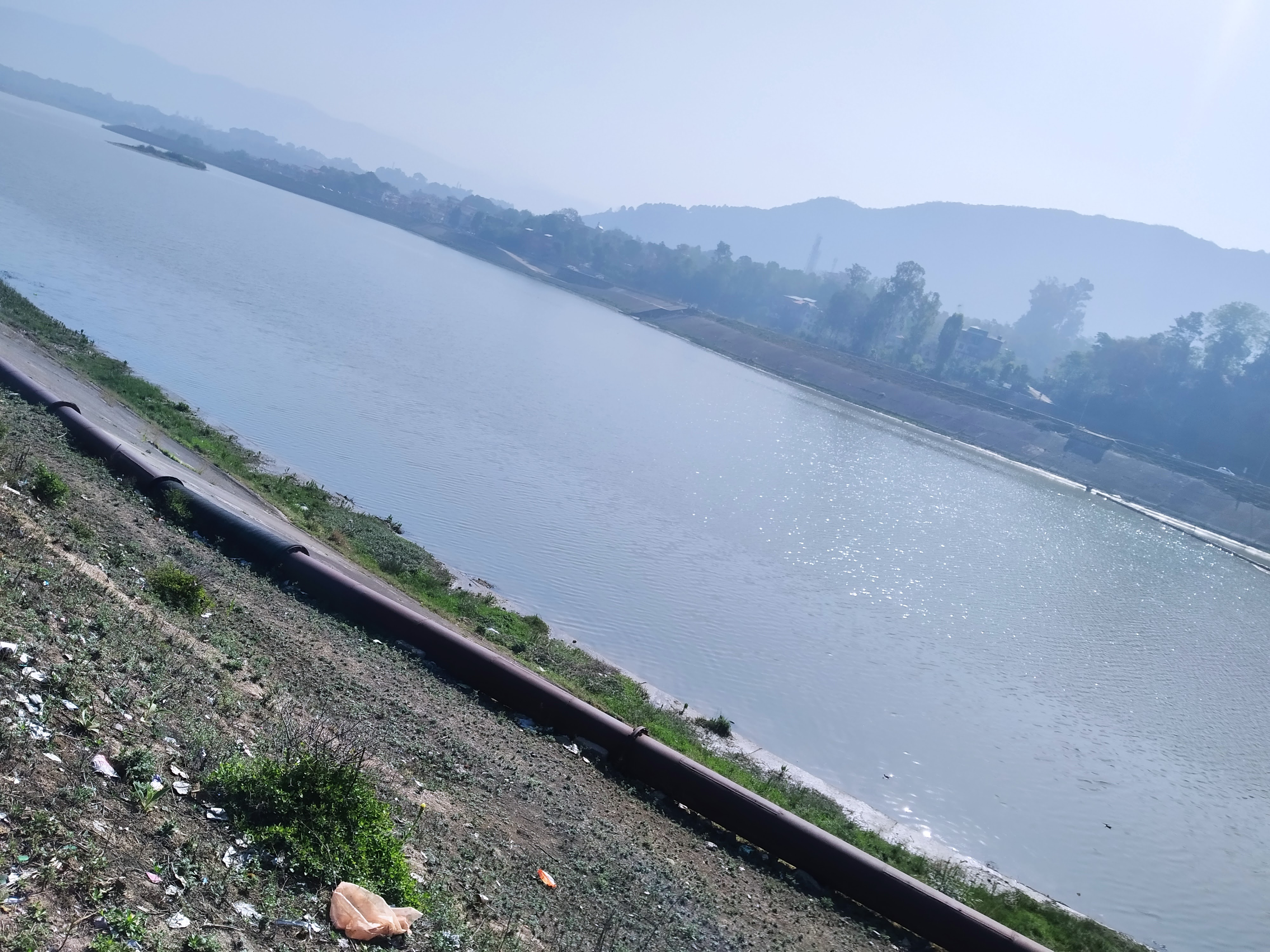
Sundar Nagar Lake at Sundar Nagar as part of the Beas-Sutlej River Link project.

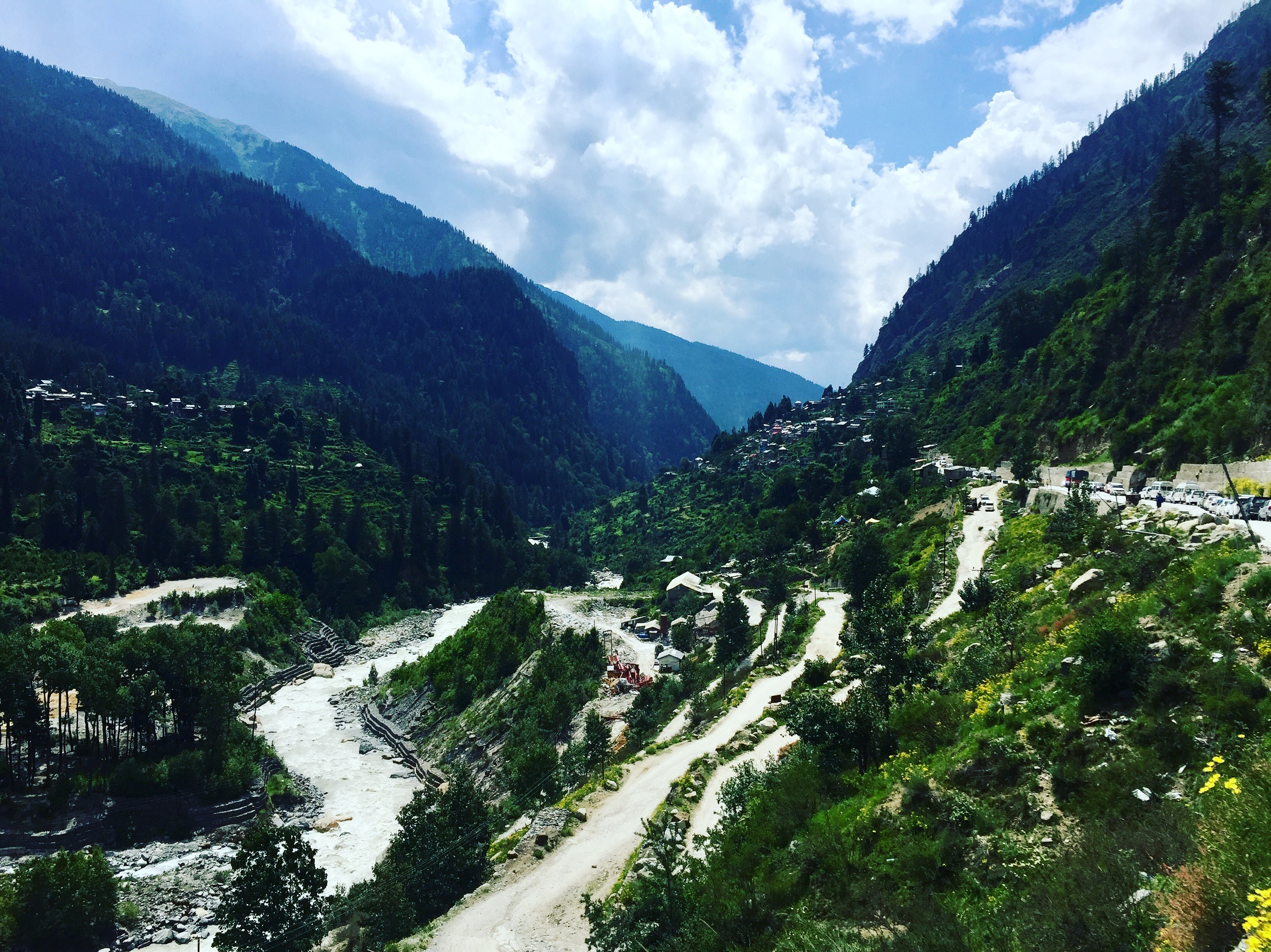
Khirganga National Park with the hairpin turn road in the Parvati River Valley near Kullu in Himachal Pradesh.

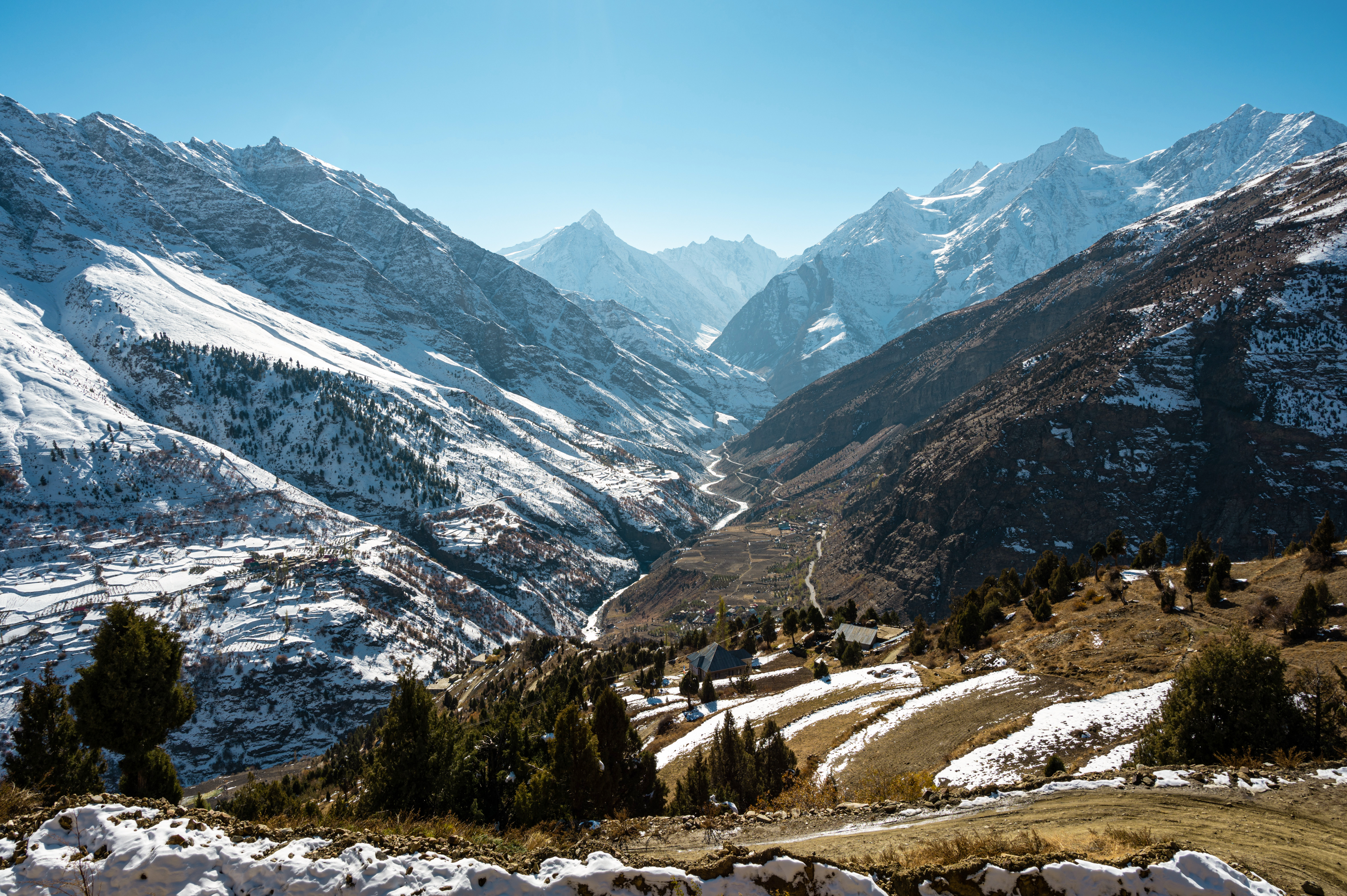
View of the Bhaga Valley and hairpin turn road from the Shashur Monastery in Keylong.

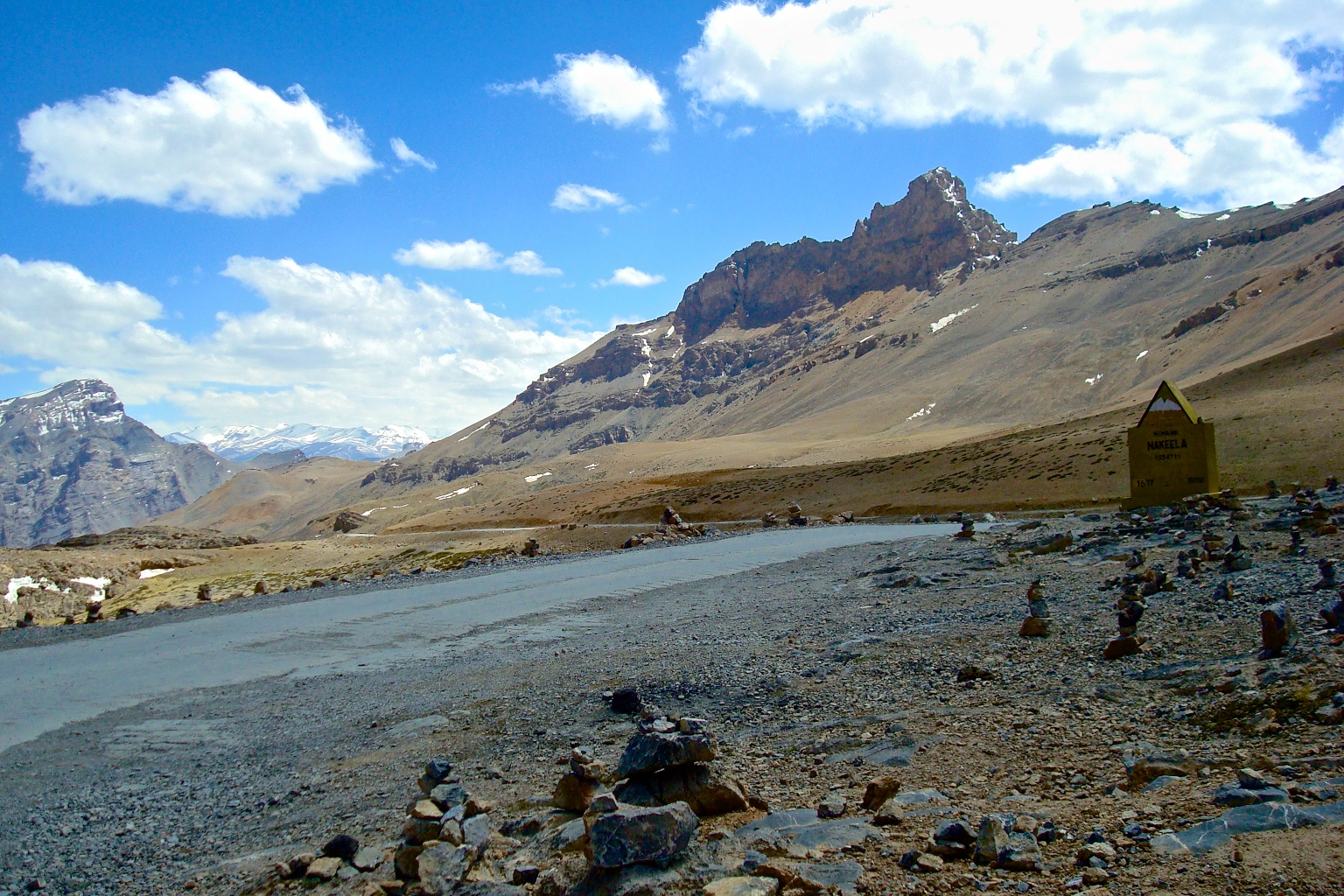
Lungalacha La with dramatic yellowish-golden hued and needle-like jagged pillar rock formations.

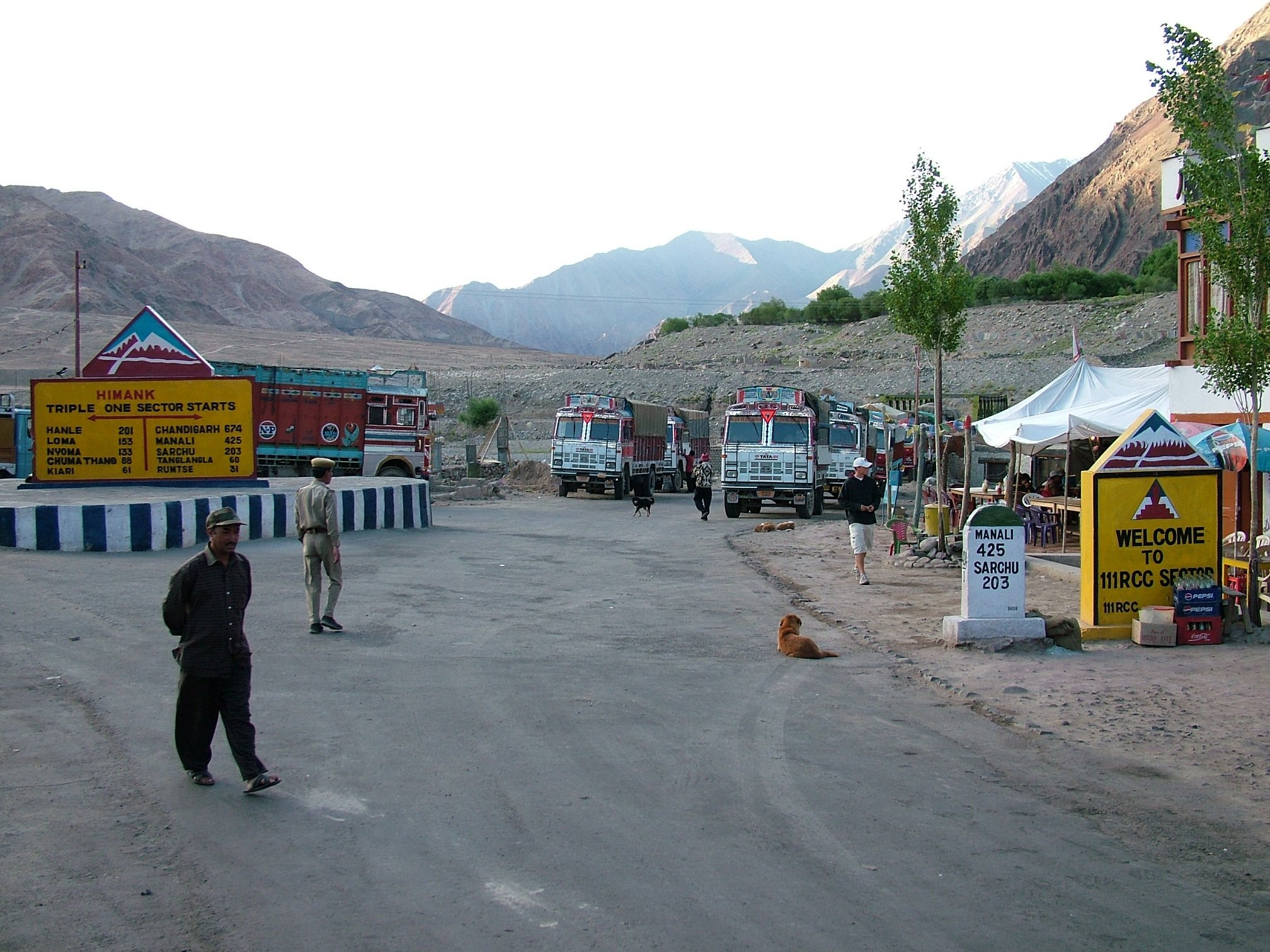
Upshi road junction along the Indus river.

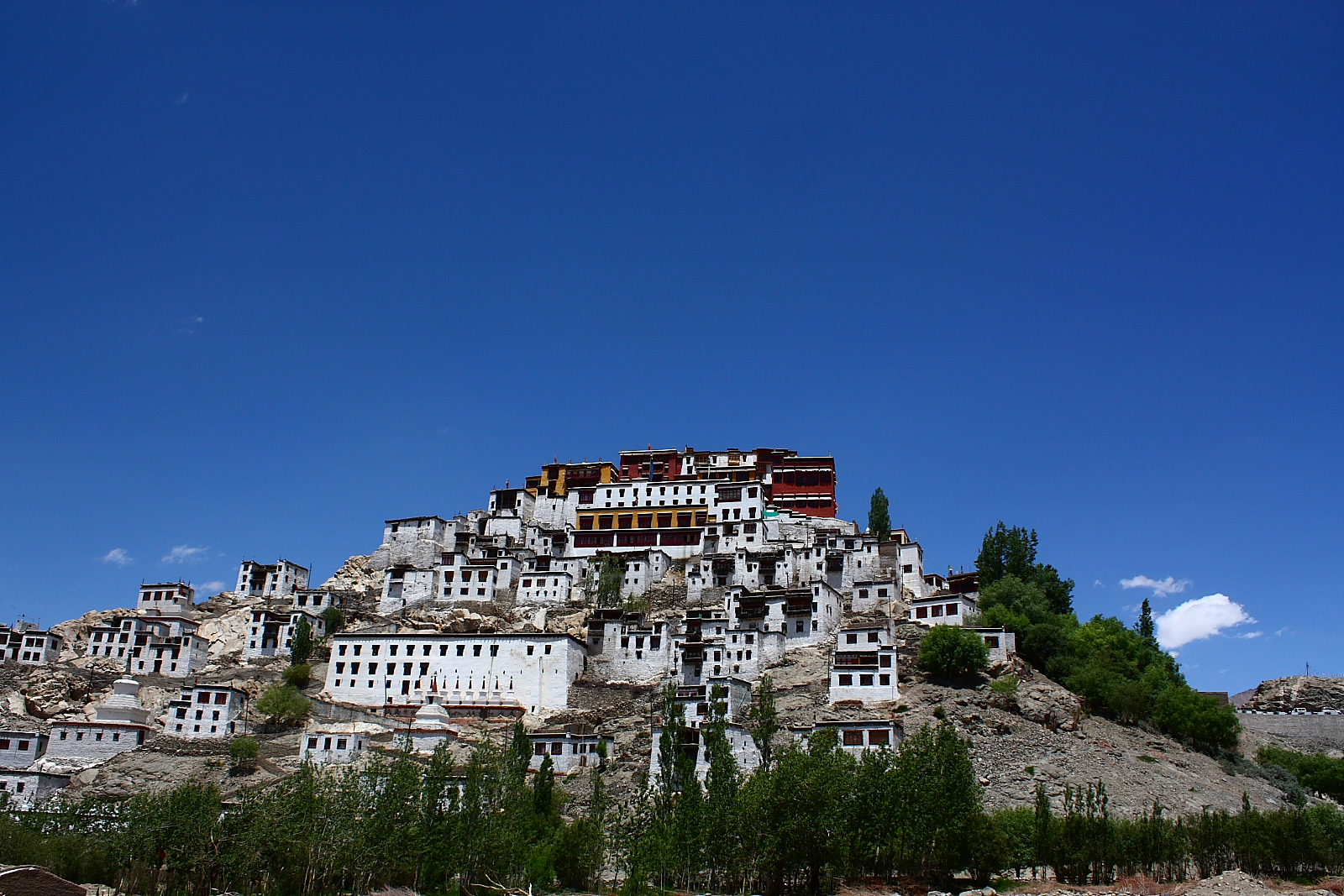
Thikse Monastery, also called the "Mini Potala" due to its resemblance with Lhasa's Potala Palace.

The project has 42 new stations, including 5 between Bhaupali to Barmana (Bilaspur) and 37 stations from Bilaspur to Leh and Sarthang.

- Punjab
  - Rupnagar district
    - Bhanupali (existing station) (300m) of Ambala-Sirhind-Una rail line connects this line to the vast mainland Indian railway network.
    - Thural (650m)
- Himachal Pradesh
  - Bilaspur district
    - Dharot (660m)
    - Jagatkhana (685m)
    - Bilaspur (670m), the town is near the Gobind Sagar Reservoir.
    - Barmana (~620m)
  - Mandi district
    - Sundar Nagar (~1,174m), literally means "Beautiful Town" famous for the Sundar Nagar Lake.
    - Mandi (~754m), line descends into the valley here before the major ascent. Mandi, on the banks of the Beas River, is also called the "Varanasi of the Hills" due to its 81 ancient stone temples most of which are dedicated to Lord Shiva and hosts the world-famous week-long Mandi International Shivratri Fair where over 200 deities from surrounding valleys are brought to the town in grand processions.
    - Pandoh (~860m), home of touristic scenic green Pandoh Dam nestled between steep hills on the Beas River that diverts water to the Sutlej River for power generation.
    - Aut (~900m), famous for the nearly 3 km long Aut Road Tunnel and acts as the critical gateway where travelers branch off to the serene Tirthan Valley Wildlife Sanctuary and the Great Himalayan National Park (GHNP).
    - Bhuntar (~1,219m), serves Kullu as the site of the Kullu-Manali Airport, is also the confluence of Parvati and Beas rivers. Bhuntar is the gateway to the touristic Parvati Valley which nestles the Kasol, Manikaran, and Khirganga National Park.
    - Naggar (~1,760m), famous for the Nicholas Roerich Art Gallery (of the famous Russian painter and explorer who lived here) and the Naggar Castle (a stunning example of regional wood-and-stone Kath kuni architecture) which served as the capital of the Kuluta Kingdom for centuries.
  - Lahaul and Spiti district
    - Manali (~2,050m), the popular hill station and tourism hub famous for the 16th-century Hidimba Devi Cave Temple, Solang Valley, and as the Adventure Capital for skiing, paragliding, and rafting.
    - Rohtang Pass Halt (~3,100m), famous for the road Atal Tunnel.
    - Koksar (~3,140m), historically famous as the coldest inhabited place in Lahaul as an ancient trade stop on the route to Tibet.
    - Sissu (~3,120m), with loop line siding for military logistics, Famous for the Sissu Waterfall (locally called Palden Lhamo) which is photographer's favorite in autumn due to the bright gold hues.
    - Tandi (~2,850m), sacred confluence (sangam) of "Chandra" (daughter of the Moon) and "Bhaga" (son of the Sun) rivers which met here to perform their eternal marriage to form the Chenab River.
    - Keylong (underground station) (~3,000m), India's first underground station built inside a tunnel, famous for Kardang Monastery.
    - Jispa (~3,200m), a riverside retreat famous for its stunning location right on the banks of the Bhaga River.
    - Darcha (~3,360m), the starting point for the famous Chadar trek and the Nimmu–Padum–Darcha road fork from NH3.
    - Bara-lacha la (~4,890m), the rail line in Himachal Pradesh from here starts to ascend in the following section climbing through the Great Himalayas range and Transhimalaya's Zanskar range toward the Ladakh border. This pass is the source of both the Chandra and Bhaga rivers.
    - Sarchu (~4,290m), famous as the border point between Himachal Pradesh and Ladakh, is a desolate windswept plateau filled with tourist tent camps with freezing night temperatures.
- Ladakh
  - Leh district
    - Lungalacha La (~5,060m, also called Lachalungla), a mountain pass just north of Himachal-Ladakh border famous for its dramatic yellowish-golden hue and needle-like jagged rock pillar formations (unlike the grey and brown peaks elsewhere) offering the "Double Pass Challenge" (second of the twin-passes along with Nakee La) with thin air as the first place where travelers from Manali to Leh feel the true effects of Acute Mountain Sickness (AMS) due to the rapid ascent from Sarchu.
    - Pang (~4,600m), gateway to the high-altitude More plains desert plateau with moonscape.
    - Debring (~4,570m), with loop line siding for military logistics, is gateway to the stunning Tso Kar (White Lake) famous for its Salt Valley and rare birdlife like the Black-necked crane.
    - Taglang La (also called "Tengla", 5,359 metres), will have Tengla Railway Station, which will be world's highest railway station. the line crosses the pass and starts descending toward the Indus River Valley and Leh. It has about 50% of the oxygen found at sea level.
    - Rumtse (~4,260m), the home of nomadic Changpa people and wildlife (Tibetan Wild Ass Kiang and Snow leopard) is famous for 108 white-washed stupas with barren reddish mountains as backdrop, and also serves as the base and starting point for the famous Rumtse to Tso Moriri trek in Rupshu plateau with dramatic "moonscape" scenery.
    - Upshi (~3,380m), the line enters into the Indus Valley and turns left to run along the Indus River. It is the critical point where the Leh–Manali Highway (NH3) meets the roads leading to the remote eastern regions of Tso Moriri and Mudh-Nyoma Air Force Station-Hanle-Nyoma-Demchok sector. Historically, a major stop on the old trade route between Leh and Tibet, it today a popular spot for bikers and travelers to refuel and acclimatize.
    - Karu (~3,450m), Chang-Karu with loop line sliding for military logistics. Karu is transit Hub for Pangong Tso in the north via Chang La Pass by turning off north from the main NH3 highway.
    - Rambir Por (~3,300m), named after the Maharaja Ranbir Singh of Jammu and Kashmir princely state.
    - Thiksey (~3,280m), famous for the Thiksey Monastery of Gelug (Yellow Hat sect of Tibetan Buddhism) which is also called the "Mini Potala" due to its resemblance with Lhasa's Potala Palace and for 15-m tall Maitreya Buddha statue.
    - Shey (~3,210m), former summer capital of Kingdom of Maryul (Kingdom of Ladakh).
    - Sindhughat (~3,180m), site of the annual Sindhu Darshan Festival held every year in June.
    - Choglamsar (~3,150m), is Dalai Lama’s summer residence (called Jivetsal) drawing tens of thousands of pilgrims from across the globe for the Kalachakra teachings (transformation of one's body and mind into perfect Buddhahood through various yogic methods), also the home of Tibetan Refugee Settlement and the Tibetan Children's Villages (TCV) school for preserving Tibetan culture and education, and Central Institute of Buddhist Studies (CIBS) which is a deemed university dedicated to the study of Buddhist philosophy, languages, and traditional arts.
    - Leh (~3,215m), with loop line siding for military logistics
    - Sesharthang (~3,250m), with loop line siding for military logistics.

=== Features ===
Bilaspur-Manali-Leh rail line, with a total length of 489 km (304 mi), including the 13 km (8.1 mi) Leh-Sasherthang rail link, will cost ₹99,000 crore (~US$12.4 billion). This includes ₹62,000 crore (~US$7.75 billion) for 62 tunnels totaling 270 km (170 mi) in length, 114 major bridges, and 90 minor bridges. Bilaspur-Leh section will have 124 major bridges, 396 minor bridges, and 52% track passing through 74 tunnels (with 27 km long Keylong tunnel being longer). Since this track passes through sub-zero cold weather, the coaches will be pressurised to maintain oxygen level and will be heated, but there will be no sleeper class seats. Construction includes structure to mitigate landslides, cloudbursts, and avalanches in the 48% section running outside the tunnels.

== Construction ==
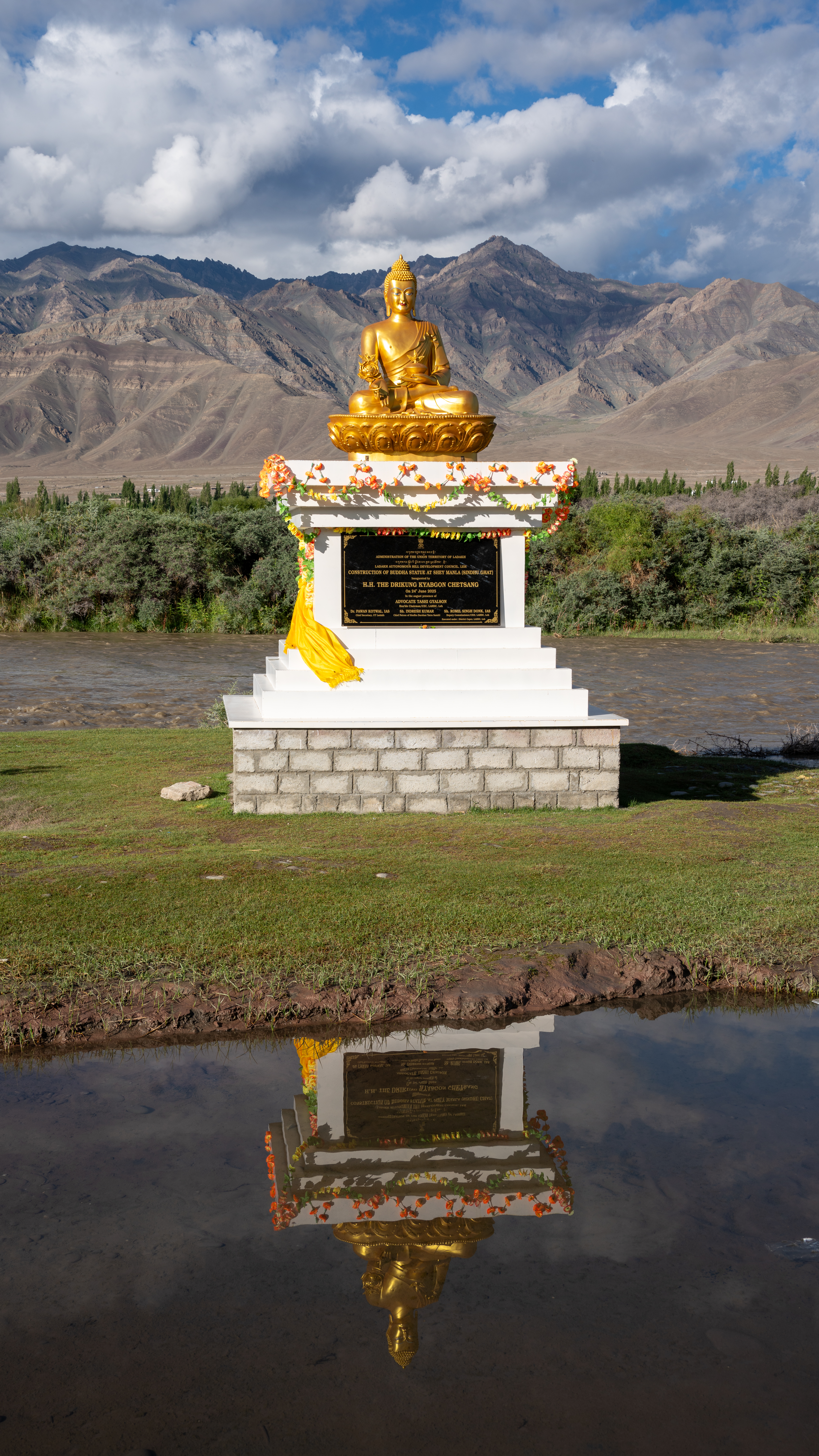
Buddha statue at Sindhu Ghat where the annual Sindhu Darshan Festival is held in June.

=== Funding ===
According to the 2022 Detailed Project Report (DPR), project cost will exceed ₹1 lakh crore. Total 2200 hectares land, including 572 hectares (26%), will be acquired at the cost of ₹11,500 crore. Bridges and tunnels will cost ₹62,000 crore including the large escape tunnels for ensuring passenger safety during emergencies. The project requires the acquisition of 1,100 ha (11 km^{2}) of land, of which 26% is forest land, at a cost of ₹11,500 crore (~US$8.5 billion). 150 km (93 mi) of approach roads will be constructed.

=== Sections ===
In March 2012, Ministry of Railways sent the project to the Planning Commission for appraisal. In December 2016, the 498 km (309 mi) the budget of ₹345 crore was approved for carrying out the Final Location Survey (FLS) for Bhanupli–Leh rail, which finally begun in June 2017, and was completed by October 2020. In March 2025, the FSL and subsequent DPR for Bilaspur-Manali-Leh line were complete.

- Section-0: Bhanupli to Barmana (Bilaspur), 63.1 km (39.2 mi) long link begins at the existing Bhanupli station,
- Section-1: Barmana to Mandi
- Section-2: Mandi to Manali
- Section-3: Manali to Upshi
- Section-4: Upshi to Leh
- Section-5: Leh to Sasherthang 13 km (8.1 mi) link, included in the project at the request of the Indian military, and Ministry of Defence had granted final approval in December 2024.

=== Section-0: Bhanupli to Barmana (Bilaspur), 63.1 km ===
The construction on this initial section is focused on connecting the existing Bhanupli railway station in the Rupnagar district of Punjab to Barmana in the Bilaspur district of Himachal Pradesh. It has a total track length of 63.1 km (39.2 mi), 20 tunnels totaling 25 km (16 mi), 24 bridges totaling 6 km (3.7 mi), and 2 viaducts totaling 2 km (1.2 mi).

=== Section-1: Barmana (Bilaspur) to Mandi ===
In May 2022, this section commenced with land acquisition between Barmana and Mandi.

== Related connectivity ==
Originally, a couple of further extensions from Leh also were planned to be constructed at a later time. However, in 2023 these were officially declared to be "shelved due to low traffic projection". They comprised the following.

- 1. Srinagar-Kargil-Leh line, 480 km (300 mi), a Rs 55,896 crore project., survey done, DPR on hold as of 2025.
  - 1.1. Leh-Kargil rail line, 210 km (130 mi).
  - 1.2. Kargil-Srinagar rail line, 225 km (140 mi).
- 2. Pathankot-Leh line, 664 km (413 mi), Rs 70,308 crore project, survey done, DPR being prepared in 2025.

== See also ==
- Highest railway stations of world
- India–China Border Roads
- Jammu–Baramulla line
- Strategic rail lines of India
- Transport in Ladakh
- Transport in Himachal Pradesh
- Railway in Himachal, Jammu and Kashmir, and Ladakh
- Aerial lift in India
