= Naggar (disambiguation) =

Naggar is an ancient town in Kullu district of Himachal Pradesh, India

Naggar may also refer to:

- Naggar Castle
- Naggar School of Photography, attended by Steve Sabella
- Naggar (surname)

== See also ==
- Najjar
