= Lakshmi Narayan Mahamaya Devasthan =

Hindu temple in Ankola, Karnataka, India

Coordinates: 14.6538°N 74.3115°E

Lakshmi Narayan Mahamaya Devasthan is a notable Hindu temple located in Hanumatta, Ankola, in the state of Karnataka. Until the late 16th century CE, the temple was originally situated in the Nagve area of Salcete taluka in Goa.

== History and mythology ==
According to the Sahyadrikhand of the Skanda Purana, the original site of Nagve (historically known as Nagavya) is associated with a mythological event where the Nāgas performed penance to seek protection from Garuda. Pleased with their devotion, Shiva protected them and promised to reside there, along with Goddess Varadabhagavati.

Another chapter in the Sahyadrikhand notes the presence of Shantadevi and Aniruddha Dev in this region. The texts describe a Brahmin sage named Shant, a reciter of the Puranas, who was a devoted follower of Shantadevi. Pleased by his worship, she granted him a boon, revealing that Aniruddha, the creator of the universe, resided within him. She then vanished into an anthill (locally called a roinn). Following this, the sage began worshipping Lord Yajnapurush, which pleased Adinarayan, who also promised to dwell in the area. This established the presence of multiple deities in the region, including Vishnu, Shantadevi, Shiva, Bhagavatidevi, Ganapati, and Bhutnath.

=== Relocation to Ankola ===
During the Portuguese era in Goa, Jesuit priests initiated a campaign of destroying Hindu temples. Facing immense pressure from widespread religious conversion efforts, many Goans fled the region, taking their ancestral family deities with them to ensure their preservation. Prior to this migration, the village of Nagve housed several deities, including Santeri, Bhagavati, Ishwar, Gavpurus, Narayan, Ravalnath, and Barajan.

While the idol of Bhagavati was moved to Marcel, other deities like Grampurus, Barajan, and Santeri were transported to Ankola by the Kulavi Mahajans. The relocation of Goddess Mahamaya posed a unique challenge, as she was manifested in the form of an anthill. According to local legend, the goddess appeared in a dream to her devotees, instructing them that she would incarnate in the form of a coconut. Guided by this vision, the devotees carried a coconut representing Mahamaya, along with the image of Lakshminarayan, out of Goa.

When the group reached the village of Hanumatta in Ankola, night had fallen. The area was covered in dense forest, so they took shelter at an existing temple dedicated to Mahishasuramardini Bhagavati. The settlement already had shrines for Virappa, Honappa, and Hanuman; the presence of the Hanuman temple is what gave the area the name "Hanumatta". The following morning, the devotees discovered that ants had formed an anthill over the coconut they had brought. Interpreting this as a divine sign that Mahamaya and Lakshminarayan wished to settle at that exact location, they formally established the deities there.

== Temple complex and additions ==
Today, the temple complex in Ankola houses shrines for Lakshminarayan, Mahamaya, Ganapati, Bhagavati, Bhutnath, Shrikampurush, Varangan, Purvasanteri, and Baler.

Over the years, several structural and religious additions have been made to the temple. On May 13, 1937, coinciding with the auspicious day of Akshaya Tritiya, three golden kalashas (finials) were installed on the temple structure. Later, the installation of the deities Ishwar Parvati took place on February 28, 1955. This was followed by the installation of Bhagavati Purva Santeri in 1957. Both of these consecration ceremonies were performed by Shrimat Vidyadhiraj, the head of the Gokarn Partagali Math.

== Worship and festivals ==
The traditional devotees and patrons (Mahajans) of the temple primarily include members of the Goud Saraswat Brahmins, Shet, and Vani communities. Due to the area's complex history, there are also individuals of the Christian faith who continue to trace their ancestral roots (Kulavis) to the goddess of this temple.

The temple celebrates numerous festivals with great fervor. A unique and prominent festival dedicated to the deity is the Bhangar Mahamaya Utsav. Other key religious observances include Navaratri Havanpuja and Chauripuja. Additionally, the temple follows a comprehensive annual calendar of traditional festivals, which include:

- Nagar Pancham (Shravan Shukla Panchami)
- Ghatasthapana (Ashwin Shukla Pratipada)
- Mahanam (Ashwin Shukla Navami)
- Dasaro / Vijayadashami (Ashwin Shukla Dashami)
- Panchami (Ashwin Vadya Panchami)
- Devkarya Santarpan
- Bahul Pancham / Vadepancham
- Kaular Puja (Ashwin Vadya Trayodashi)
- Vanbhojanotsav (Kartik Purnima)
- Parvakalda Punav (Margashirsha Shukla Purnima)
- Divjam Pancham (Magha Shukla Panchami)
- Holi (Phalguna Purnima)
- Sugiutsav (Phalguna Vadya Tritiya)
