= Naggar (surname) =

Naggar is a surname. Naggar, al-Naggar, el-Naggar, etc. may refer to the following notable people:

- Ahmad Ibrahim al-Sayyid al-Naggar, member of the Egyptian Islamic Jihad, an Islamist terrorist group
- Ahmed El-Nagar (born 1964), Egyptian boxer
- Carole Naggar, poet, historian, curator, and painter
- Chris Naggar (born 1997), American football player
- Mostafa Alnagar (born 1980), Egyptian opposition figure and politician
- Reut Naggar (born 1983), Israeli producer, cultural entrepreneur and social activist
- Zaghloul El-Naggar (1933–2025), Egyptian geologist, Muslim scholar, and author

== See also ==
- Naggar (disambiguation)
