= Mandi Shivaratri Fair =

Hindu fair celebrated in India

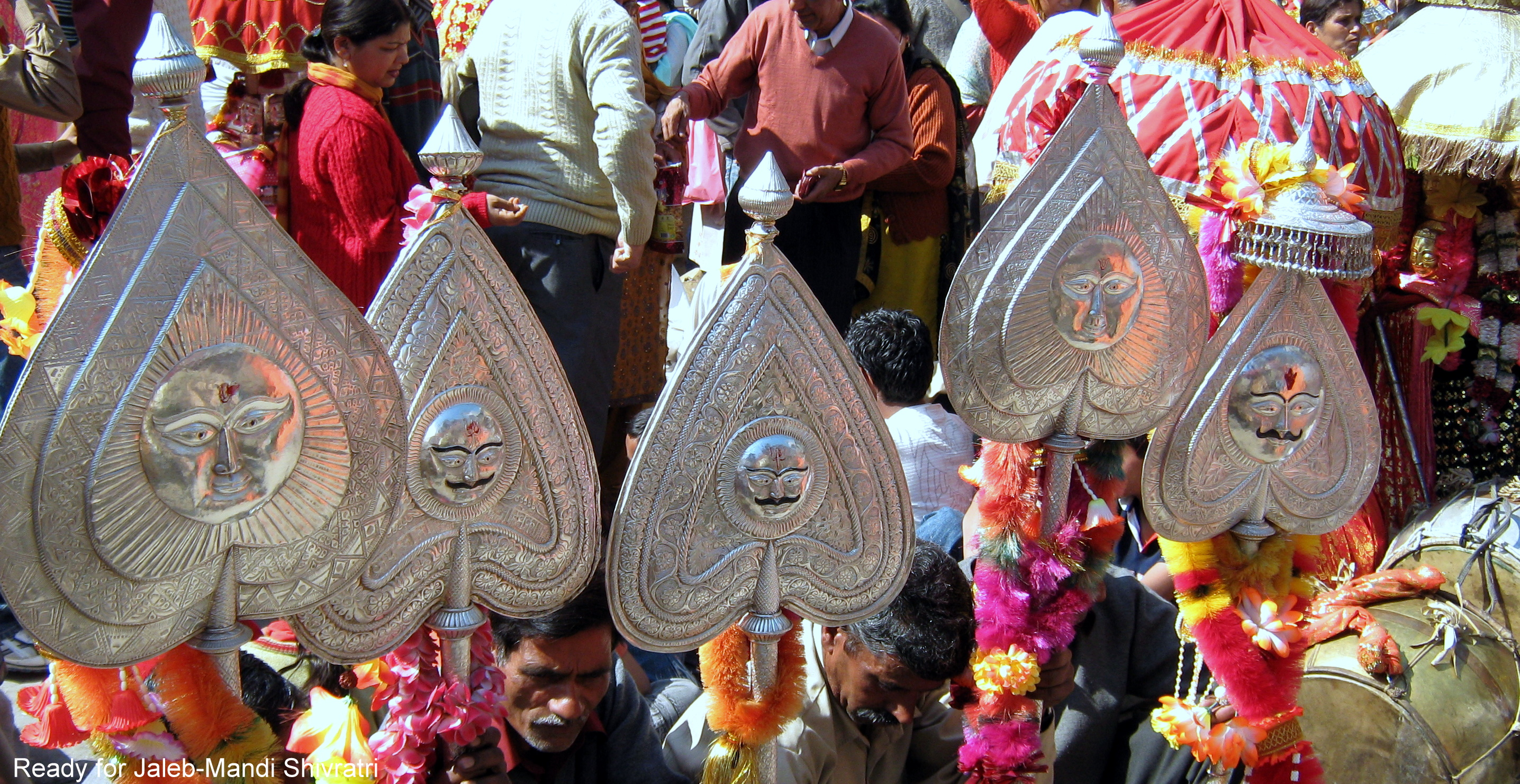
- Insignia of deities
- Observed by: Hindus
- Type: Hindu
- Significance: Shivaratri Puja
- Observances: About 200 deities gather for the fair
- Date: February/March
- Related to: Worship of Vishnu and Shiva

Mandi Maha Shivaratri Fair is an international fair that is held for 7 days starting with the Hindu festival of Shivaratri, in the Mandi town (31.72°N 76.92°E) of the Indian state of Himachal Pradesh.

The Mandi Maha Shivaratri fair is held as per Hindu calendar every year on the Krishna paksha 13th day/13th night (breaking fast/'vrata' on 14th after sunrise) of the waning moon in the month of Phalguna that corresponds to February/March as per Gregorian calendar. The festival’s popularity is widespread and hence is known as an international festival. In view of the large number of Hindu gods and goddesses that are invited to the festival from its 81 temples, Mandi town has the title of 'Varanasi of the Hills'. During 2016, the festival will be celebrated from 7 March (Shivaratri day) for seven days till 14 March 2016.

The Mandi festival or fair is a festival when all Hindu gods and goddesses, said to be more than 200 deities of the Mandi district assemble there, starting with the day of Maha Shivaratri. Mandi town located on the banks of the Beas River, popularly known as the "cathedral of temples", is one of the oldest towns of Himachal Pradesh with about 81 temples of different deoties in its periphery. There are several legends linked to the celebration of this event. The festival is centered on the protector deity of Mandi "Madho Rai" (Vishnu) and Shiva of the Bhootnath temple in Mandi. The festival is a synthesis of Shaiva and Vaishnava traditions.

== History ==
Mandi town, where the festival is held, was ruled by Raja Ajbar Sen who was considered the first great ruler of Mandi State in the sixteenth century, since he not only combined the hereditary regions but also added to it by conquering new areas. Apart from his palace, he built the temple of Bhootnath (temple for Shiva) at the centre of the Mandi town, which is one of the two focal temples of the festival. In the theocratic state that evolved during this period, worship of Shiva and related Hindu goddesses was dominant. However, the theocratic nature of the state received special emphasis when, during Raja Suraj Sen’s reign, Vishnu worship also became integral to the State. Raja Suraj Sen (1664 to 1679), who did not have an heir, built the temple known as "Madhav Rai temple", dedicated to a form of Vishnu, as protector of Mandi. An elegant silver image of Radha and Krishna was made by his goldsmith Bhima, in the year 1705, which was named "Madho Rai" and deified, and ordained as the King of the State of Mandi thereafter. Since then the rulers served the state as servants of Madho Rai and custodians of the State. Suraj Sen’s successors have also held the deity of the temple in great reverence. This god is represented with precedence over all other gods on various religious occasions. The theocratic nature of the people of the state is amply reflected during the popular "Mandi Maha Shivaratri Fair", which is held every year with great fanfare.

However, the specific observance of this festival as a fair, starting with Shivaratri, is linked to its ruler Ishwari Sen. Ishawri Sen was held a prisoner for 12 years after he lost his kingdom in the war waged by Sansar Chand of Punjab, in 1792. He was released by the Gurkha invaders who had invaded the Kangra and Mandi states. Afterwards, the Gurkhas' restored the Mandi state to Ishwari Sen. He was given a reception on the occasion of his return to Mandi, his state capital. On this occasion, the King invited all hill deities of the Kingdom and held a grand celebration, and this day happened to be the Maha Shivratri festival day. Since then the practice of holding the Mandi fair during Shivaratri has been observed every year at Mandi. In recent years, modernity has also set in with Bollywood artists performing at the fair at Paddal in the celebrations in the evenings.

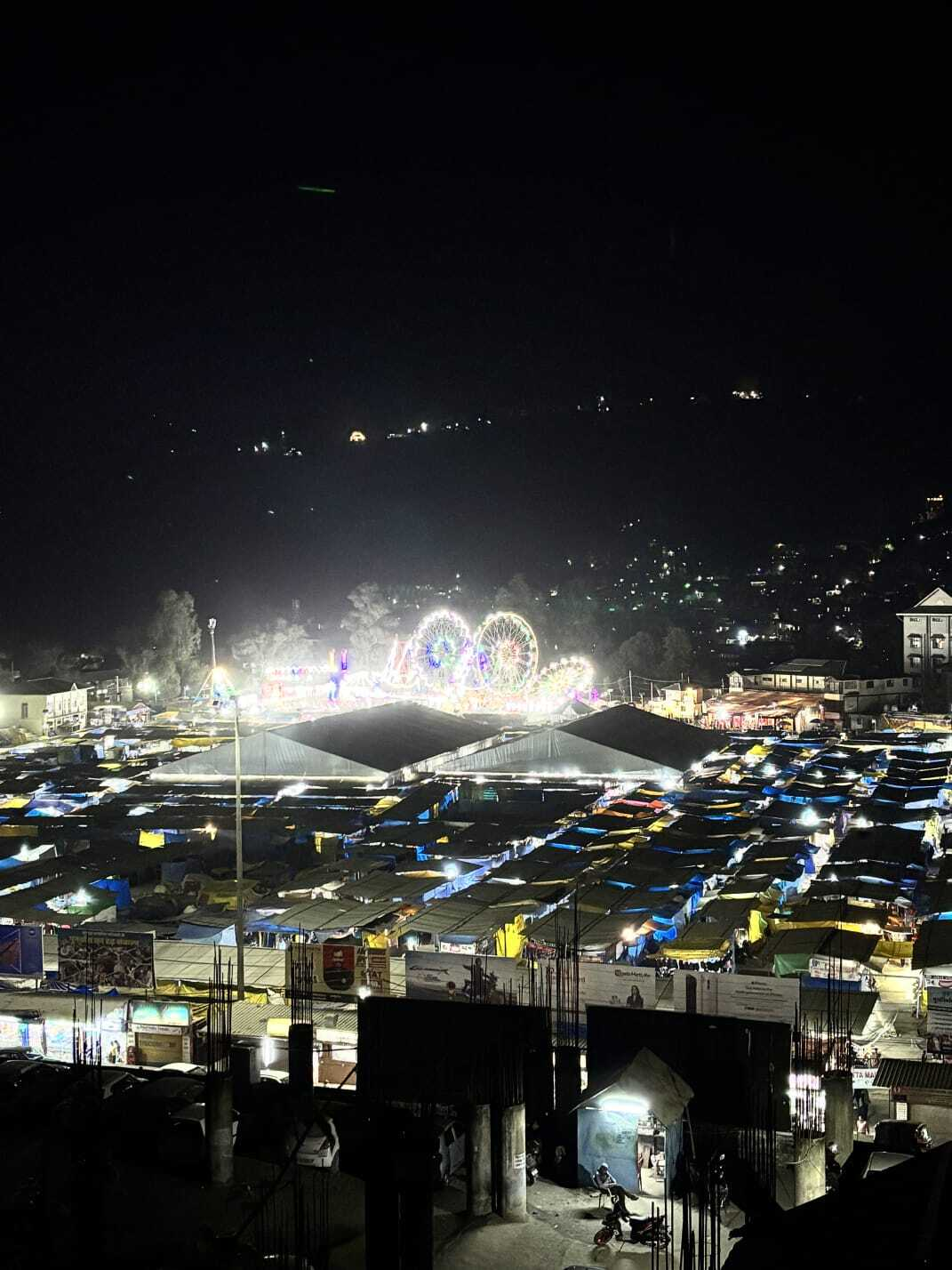
Night View of Mandi Shivaratri Mela as seen from IIT Mandi Bus Stop

== Observance ==
It is an accepted practice that every deity that is brought to the festival (decorated with glittering embroidered drapery) visits Madho Rai temple first to pay obeisance to Vishnu and then proceed to the palace in a colourful procession called the Shoba Yatra, known locally as 'Zareb,' to honour the ruler (the regent of the Madho Rai). (It is said that Madho Rai comes out of his temple only once a year on the Shivaratri day and leads the procession).

The fair is also an occasion when local traders and people carry out brisk trade in local products such as wool, opium, honey, walnut, ghee (butter oil), and general merchandise from the region of Kangra, Kullu, Shimla, Bilaspur and from the neighbouring state of Punjab. It is said that the festivities promote handcrafted jewellery of the region. However, during the entire Mandi Shivaratri Fair, religiosity is the main theme. It is said that religious synthesis was achieved by combining the worship of Vishnu and Shiva cults during the seven-day fair.

One day before the concluding day of the festival at the end of fanfare, music and dance, in the evening, Jagaran ("night vigil," a nightlong worship) is held. On this occasion, a guru and his disciple proclaim prophesies for the following year. On the last day of the festivities, prayers are chanted and, after paying obeisance to Shiva, all the deities assembled in Mandi depart to their original abodes. On this occasion, chadars (a form of devotional drapery offering to their god) are offered. It is an occasion when the head of the state (now a governor) is normally present on the last day, joins the worship, and accompanies the pageant. During all these festivities, it is said that Rishi Kamru Nag (local god of rains), the presiding deity of the Maha Shivaratri, after paying his obeisance to Madho Rai, moves to the Tarna ma temple at the top of the Tarna hill from where he watches the proceedings of the fair for seven days.

Bhootnath Temple, with an idol of a manifestation of Shiva, an ancient temple dated to the 1520s, is synonymous with Mandi. It is in the heart of the town. The Nandi, Shiva's mount, faces the deity from the ornamented double-arched entrance. The festival of Maha Shivaratri is the prime event at this temple; the temple is the focal point of the seven day festival.

A legend is told of the building of Bhoothnath Temple. It is said that, in 1526, Raja Ajber Sen heard the story of a cow offering milk on her own volition to a particular stone in a forest in Mandi. Shiva is said to have appeared in the Raja’s dream and directed him to extricate the Shiva Linga that was buried at that site. Thereafter, the Raja found the Shiva Linga at the indicated location, which he deified in a temple that he erected in 1526, at the place it was found. He called it the "Bhootnath Temple" and started the observance of the Shivaratri festival at Mandi. Concurrent with this event, the Raja shifted his capital from Bhiuli to Mandi.

== Gallery ==
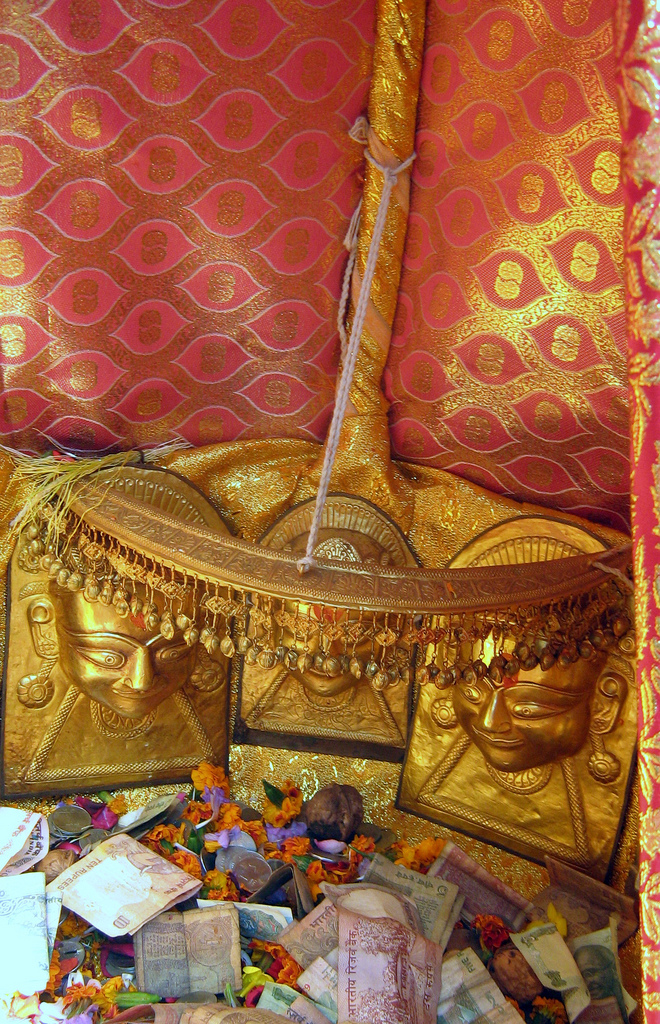
Deities placed at Paddal, the venue of the fair

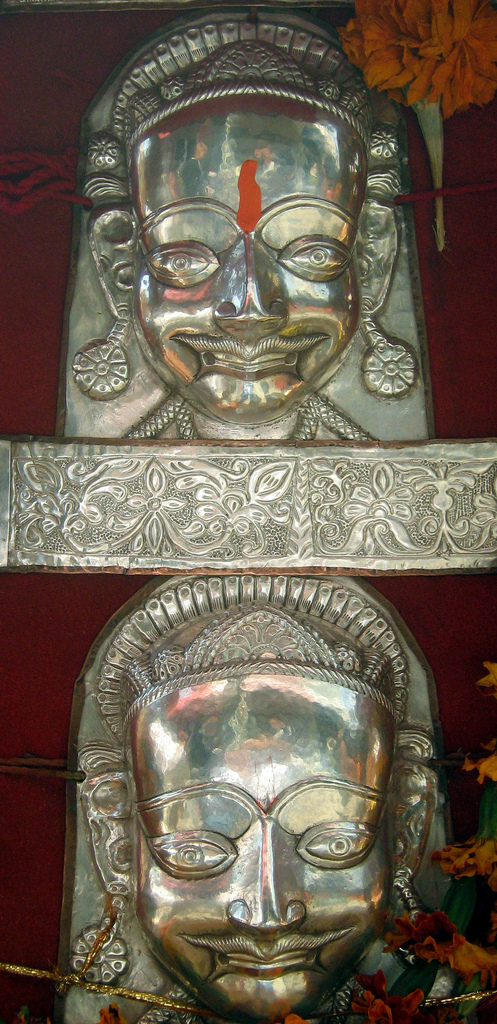
Chehra
