= Najjar =

Najjar (Arabic: نجّار) is an Arabic and Sephardic surname and profession meaning carpenter. Notable people with surnames Najjar, al-Najjar, or al-Najar include:

== Ancient ==
- Habib Al-Najjar (c. AD 5-40), or Saint Habib the Carpenter
- Yousef Al-Najjar (c. 90 BC-AD 18), or Saint Joseph the Carpenter, Jesus's legal father
- Ibn Al Najjar a hanbali scholar of Sunni Islam

== Modern ==
- Aida Najjar (1938–2020), Palestinian-Jordanian writer
- Alaa Najjar, physician, Wikipedian, and internet activist
- Ammar Campa-Najjar (born 1989), American Democratic politician
- Ahmad El Najjar, Egyptian economist
- Ammar Al-Najar (born 1997), Saudi football player
- Fadel Al-Najjar (born 1985), Jordanian professional basketball player
- Fouad Najjar (1930–1992), Lebanese agronomist and politician
- Ibrahim Najjar, Lebanese lawyer and politician
- Humaid Al-Najar, Emirati footballer
- John Najjar, executive stylist at Ford Motor Company and creator of the Ford Mustang
- Mansor Al-Najar, Saudi football player
- Marwan G. Najjar (1947–2023), Lebanese scriptwriter
- Mostafa Mohammad-Najjar (born 1956), Iranian politician
- Moudi Najjar (born 2000), Australian football player
- Muhammad Youssef al-Najjar (1930–1973), commonly known as Abu Youssef, Palestinian militant
- Najwa Najjar (born 1965), Palestinian filmmaker
- Redha al-Najar, Tunisian citizen who was held in US custody in the Bagram Theater Internment Facility
- Ramsay G. Najjar (1952–2020), Lebanese businessman
- Rouzan al-Najjar, Palestinian nurse assisting injured Palestinians killed by Israeli sniper on June 1, 2018
- Victor Assad Najjar (1914–2002), Lebanese-born American pediatrician and microbiologist, known for the Crigler–Najjar syndrome

== Fictional characters ==
- Noore Najjar, a fictional character from 2014 Ubisoft video game Far Cry 4

== See also ==
- Naggar
