= Khirganga National Park =

National park in India

Coordinates: 32.005°N 77.666°E

- IUCN category II (national park)
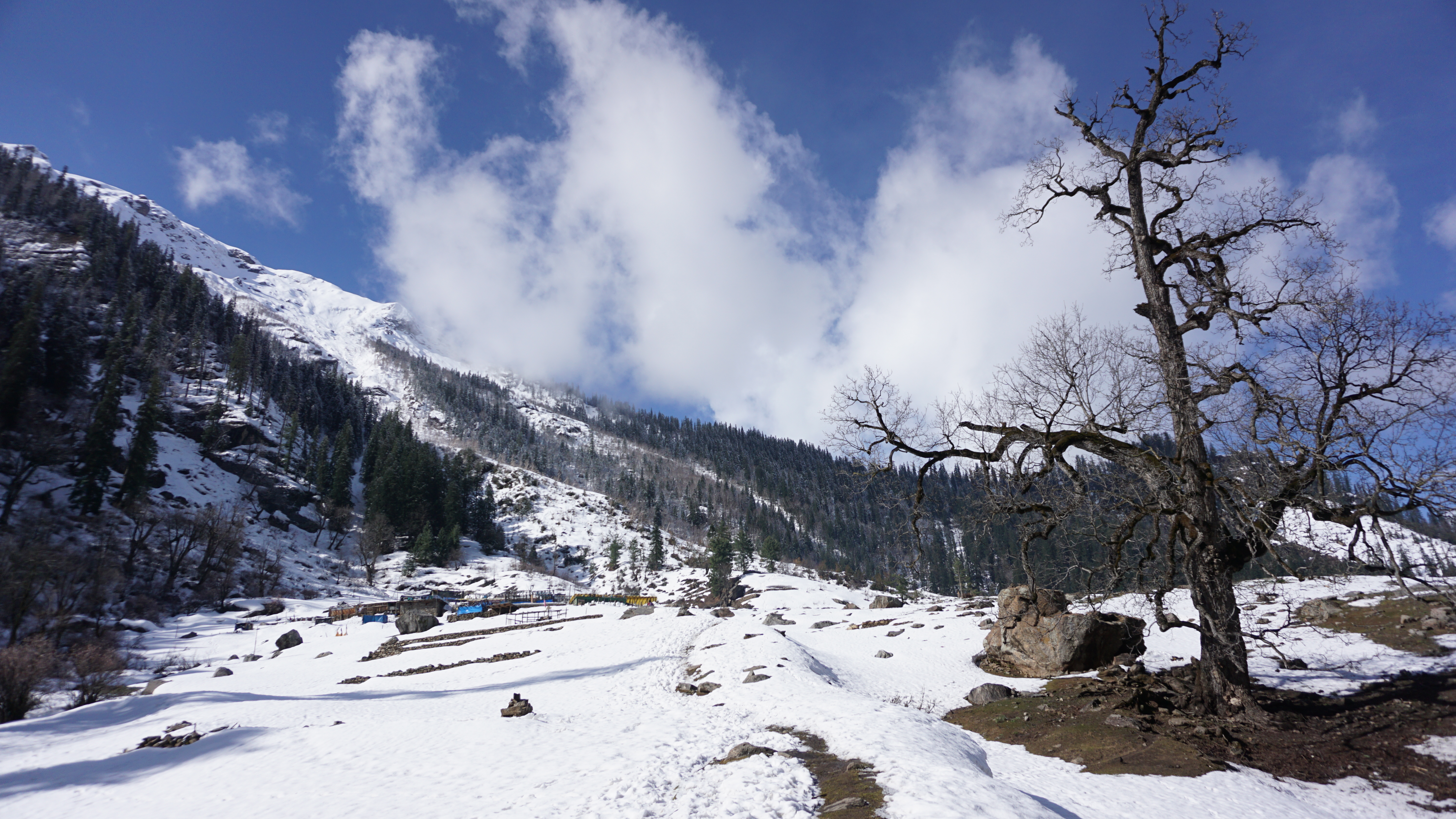

- Location within Himachal Pradesh Location within India
- Interactive map of Khirganga National Park
- Location: Kullu district, Himachal Pradesh, India
- Area: 710 km^{2} (270 sq mi)
- Established: 2010

Khirganga National Park is a national park in Himachal Pradesh, India, established in 2010.

Located in Kullu, the park covers an area of about 710 km^{2} (270 sq mi). The park is located at an altitude of 2,000 m (6,600 ft).
