= Early history of Himachal Pradesh =

According to the Mahabharta, the present day Himachal Pradesh consisted of a number of small republics also known as the Janpadas..

1. Audumbras – They were one of the most ancient tribes of Himachal who resided in the lower hills of Pathankot and Jwalamukhi. They formed a separate province in 2 B.C.
2. Trigarta – The state was laid in the foothills drained by 3 rivers, namely- Ravi, Beas and Satluj. It is believed that the state was an independent republic.
3. Kuluta – The kingdom of Kuluta was located in the upper Beas valley which is also known as the Kullu valley. The state capital was Naggar.
4. Kulindas – The kingdom covered the area between the Beas, Satluj and Yamuna rivers. The administration resembled a republic with the members of central assembly sharing the powers of the head.
5. Guptas – Chandragupta captured the republics of the Himachal by the use of his force though he usually did not rule them directly. Ashoka, his grandson extended his boundaries to the Himalayan region. He introduced Buddhism to the state. He built various stupas here.
6. Harsha – After the collapse of Guptas and before the rise of Harsha, the area was again ruled by chiefs also known as Thakurs and Ranas. With the rise of Harsha in the 7th century, most of these small provinces acknowledged its allround supremacy though many local powers remained with the chiefs.
7. Rajput Period – After Harsha's death (647 A.D.) Rajput states ascended in Rajasthan and Indus plains. They moved to the hills with their followers, where they established small provinces or principalities. Some of these were Kangra, Nurpur, Suket, Mandi, Kutlehar, Baghal, Bilaspur, Nalagarh, Keonthal, Dhami, Kunihar, Bushahar, Sirmour.

== See also ==
- Vedic era
  - Mahajanapadas
  - Janapada
  - Painted Grey Ware culture pottery associated with the Vedic era
- History of Himachal Pradesh
