= Bhootnath (deity) =

Hindu Deity

Bhootnath (also spelled Bhutnath) in Shaivism, is a form of Lord Shiva and is believed to govern over spirits or ghosts, ensuring that they do not harm the living or disrupt the cosmic balance.

== Etymology and mythology ==
The name Bhootnath is a compound of two words: Bhoot (spirit or ghost) and Nath (lordship or mastery).

Bhootnath is a common name for Lord Shiva. This aspect of Shive is rooted in Vedic and Puranic traditions where The Skanda Purana elaborates on Shiva's role as Bhūtanātha, the guardian who controls spirits and protects devotees. This form of Shive highlights his omnipotence, empathy and ties to all living things and the afterlife. This aspect of Shiva, is invoked for exorcism, protection from evil spirits, and removal of negative energies.

== Iconography ==
Bhoothnath is often depicted with attributes such as a trident (Trishula), to represents his power to dispel evil, as well as a garland of skulls, representing his control over the realm of the departed. Sometimes Bhoothnath is depicted surrounded by ghostly figures signifying his role as the master of spirits.

== Regional worship ==
=== Goa ===
In Goan tradition, Bhootnath is recognized as the commander (senapati) of the Hindu deity Mahadeva or the leader of his attendant spirits, the Bhairavgana. Conversely, outside the region of Goa, Mahadeva himself is directly identified as Bhootnath. This association stems from the belief that Mahadeva resides in crematoriums (masand) and regulates the gatherings of ghosts and spirits (bhut-khet), who function as his divine army. Consequently, the deity is also referred to as Bhuteshwar

==== Daily offerings and local practices ====
Daily rituals typically include an offering (naivedya) of one payli (a local unit of measurement) of rice khichdi. Devotees also frequently make vows to light a ritual pipe (chilmi) for the deity. In the village of Avedem-Quepem, a specific custom involves a village devotee wearing a sacred cloth (cheer), tying ankle bells (ghagryo), and dancing in front of Bhootnath while striking a gong (jagant). Daily worship in Pernem is conducted by the Kothkar (treasury keeper).

==== Folklore ====
A popular legend in Amona (Bicholim) narrates that Bhootnath went out for a nocturnal stroll (bhovdek) and stopped at the local port (bandar) to wait for a ferry to cross the river. He was required to cross before the first cock crowed. However, the ferry was delayed, and a rooster crowed before his departure, forcing Bhootnath to remain permanently at the port.

== Temples ==
Baba Bhootnath Temple, located in the city of Mandi, Himachal Pradesh.

Bhootnath Temple, located in Rishikesh, Uttarakhand.
