= Naggar Castle =

Medieval castle, located in Kullu, Himachal Pradesh, India

Coordinates: 32.112°N 77.165°E

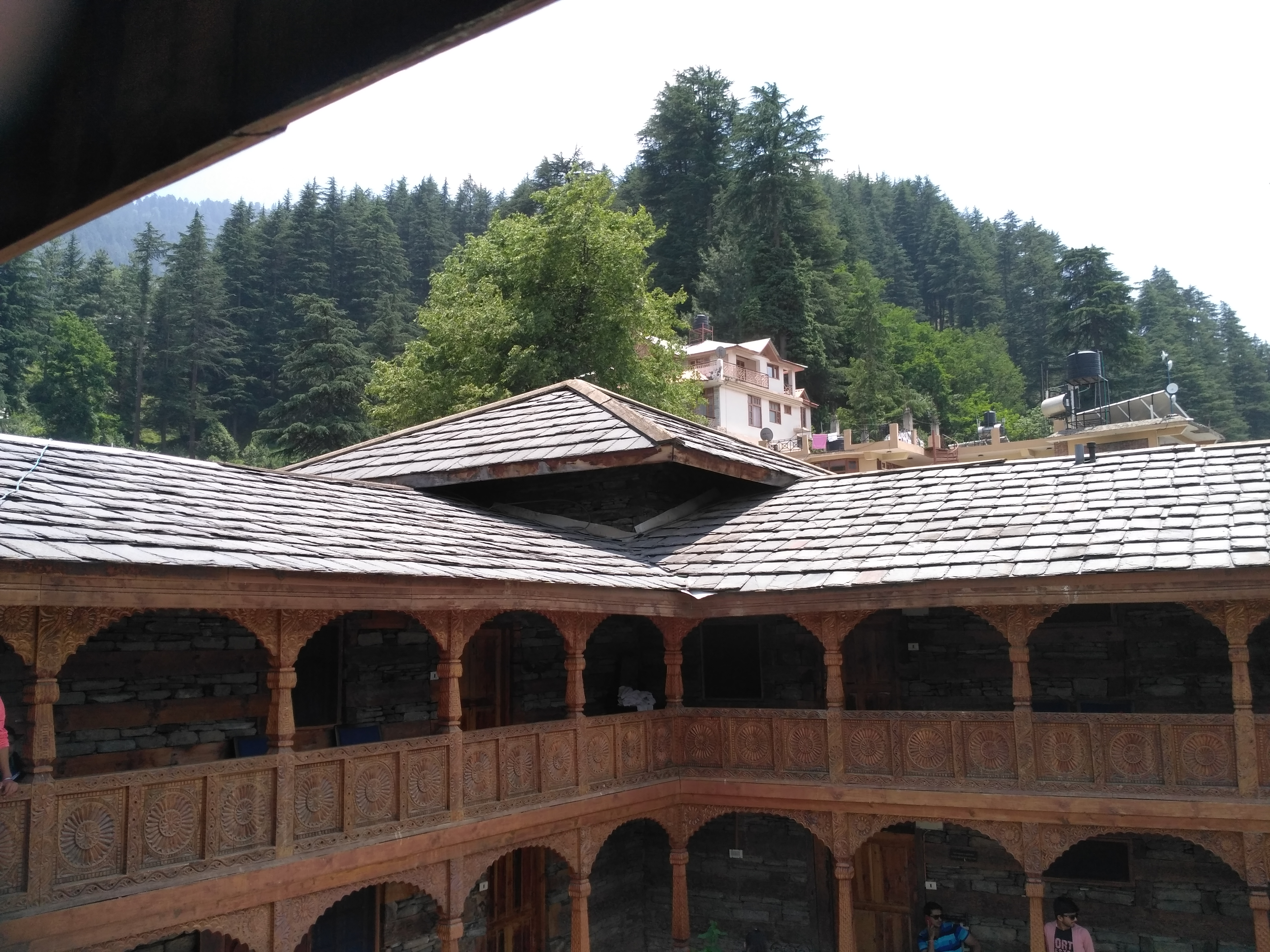
Naggar Castle

Naggar Castle is a medieval castle, located in Kullu, Himachal Pradesh, India. It was built by Raja Sidh Singh of Kullu around 1460 AD, it was taken over by the Himachal Pradesh Tourism Development Corporation (HPTDC), to run as a heritage hotel, in 1978.

== History ==
It was the official seat of kings for centuries. According to a legend, Raja Sidh Singh used stones from the abandoned palace (Gardhak) of Rana Bhonsal to build the castle.

== Gallery ==
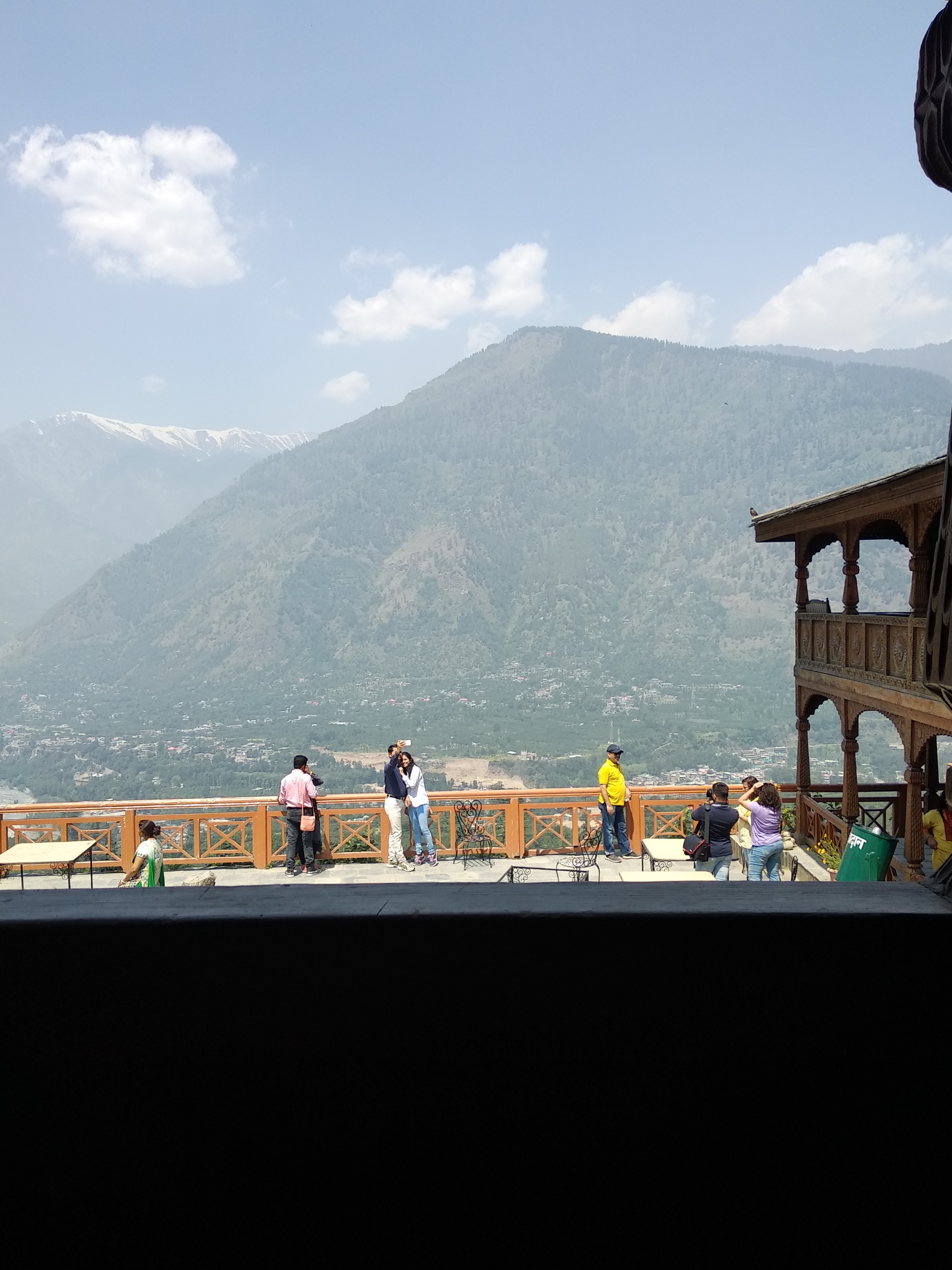
View from Naggar Castle

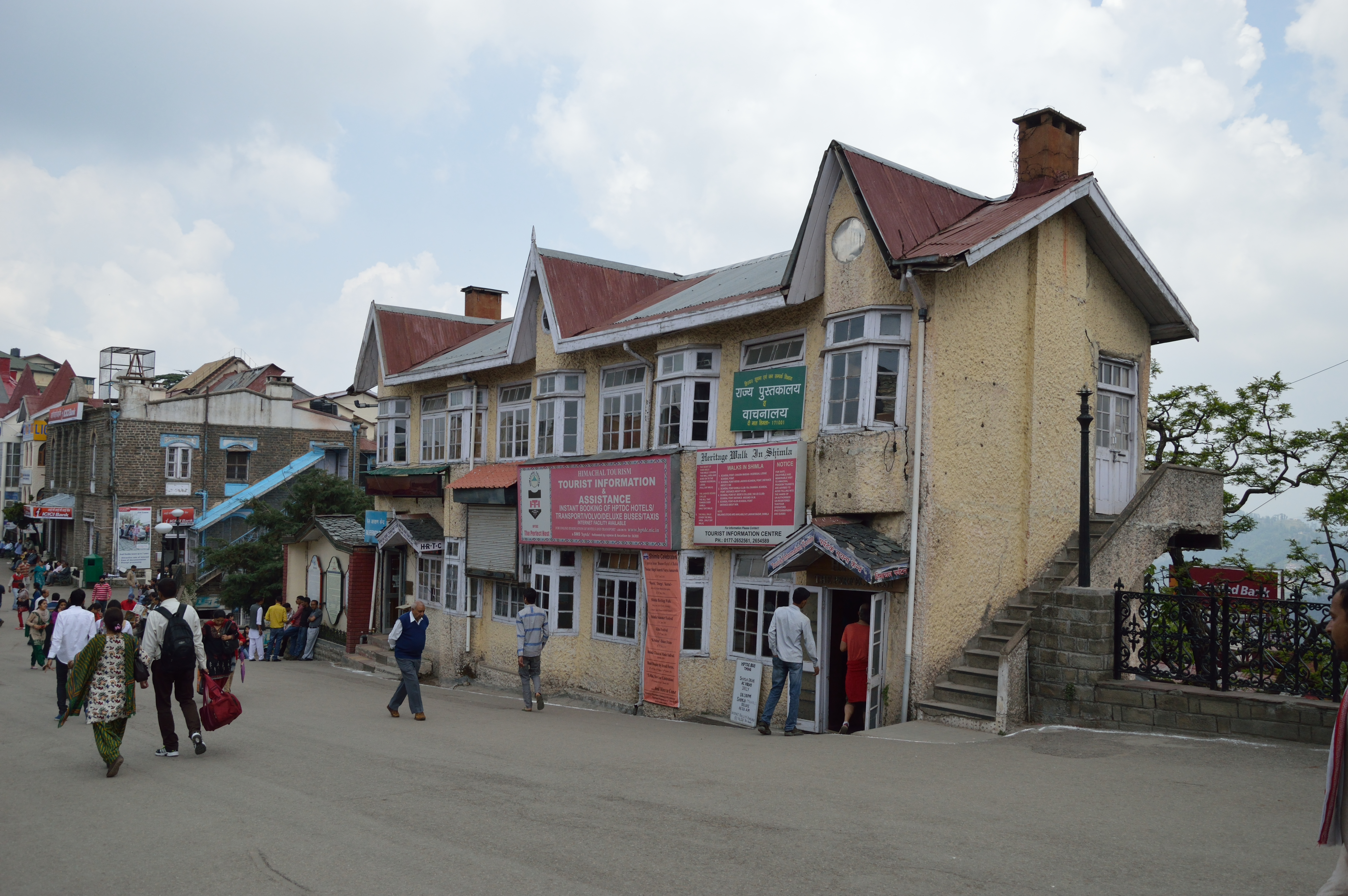
HPTDC Office, Shimla, Himachal Pradesh

== See also ==
- Naggar, an ancient town in Kullu district of Himachal Pradesh
