= Naggar, Himachal Pradesh =

Town in Himachal Pradesh

Naggar
- Town
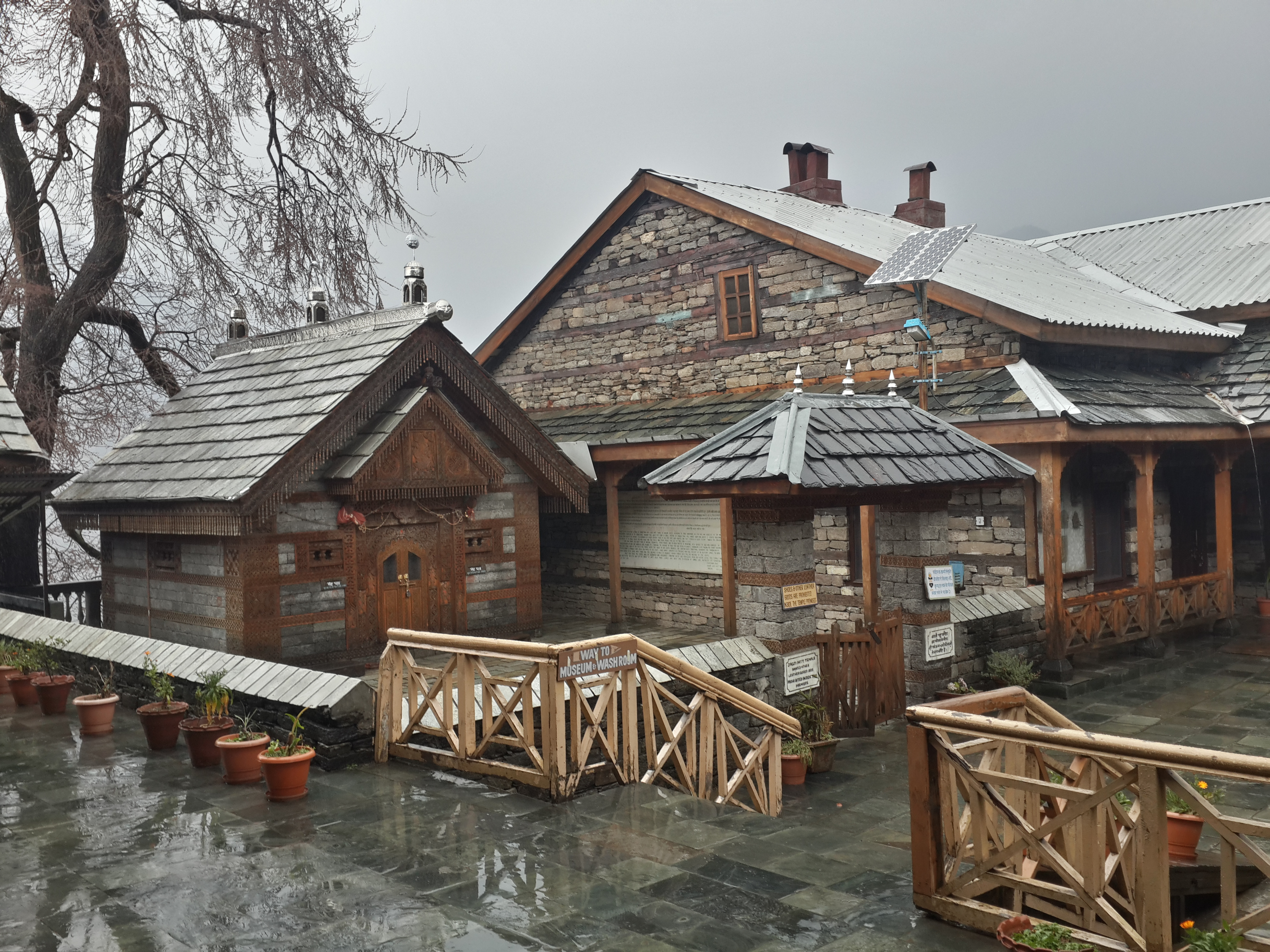
- Naggar Castle

- Location in Himachal Pradesh, India Naggar (India)
- Coordinates: 32.12°N 77.17°E
- Country: India
- State: Himachal Pradesh
- District: Kullu
- Elevation: 1,800 m (5,900 ft)

Languages
  - Official: Hindi
  - Regional: Kullui
- Time zone: UTC+5:30 (IST)
- Postal code: 175130
- Vehicle registration: HP
- Sex ratio: 9:8 ♂/♀

Situated on the left bank of the river Beas at an altitude of 1,800 meters, Naggar is an ancient town in Kullu district of Himachal Pradesh, India. It was once the capital of the Kullu kingdom.

== Geography ==
Naggar is located 22 kilometres (14 mi) north of the district headquarters at Kullu and 230 kilometres (140 mi) north of the state capital at Shimla.

It is bounded by Kullu Tehsil towards South, Spiti Tehsil towards East, Drang Tehsil towards South and Lahul Tehsil towards North. Manali, Keylong, Mandi, Sundarnagar and Hamirpur are some of the nearby towns to Naggar.

== Climate ==
The climate in Naggar is mild. In winter, there is much less rainfall than in summer. The average temperature is 16.6 °C. In a year, the average rainfall is 1,730 mm.

== History ==
Naggar was the capital of the erstwhile Kullu Rajas for about 1400 years. It was founded by the Visudh Pal and remained as the state headquarters until the capital was transferred to Kullu (Sultanpur) by Raja Jagat Singh.

Naggar Castle, the official seat of kings for centuries, was built by Raja Sidh Singh more than 500 years ago. According to a legend, he used stones from the abandoned palace (Gardhak) of Rana Bhonsal to build the castle. He ordered the labourers to form a human chain over the Beas River connecting its left and right banks to transfer the stones manually. The castle survived the earthquake of 1905. While most houses in the valley and the nearby city of Jawa were completely ruined, the castle's use of earthquake-proof techniques helped it sustain despite the calamity.

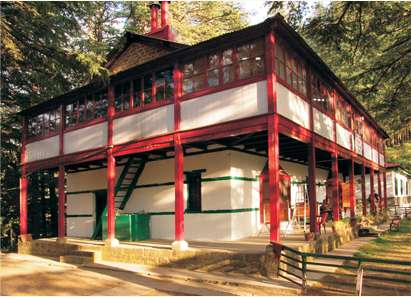
Himalayan Research Institute named Urusvati in Naggar.

In 1978 it was taken over by Himachal Pradesh Tourism Development Corporation (HPTDC), to run as a heritage hotel.

The Russian painter and explorer Nicholas Roerich settled in Naggar in the early 20th century. The Roerich Estate, his two-floor house, is now a museum and key attraction of the town featuring a collection of his popular paintings.

== Transport ==
=== Air ===
The nearest airport is Bhuntar Airport in Kullu (IATA code KUU) located in Bhuntar town at a distance of 40.2 km (25 mi) from Naggar. The airport is situated on NH21 at a distance of 10 km (6 mi) south of Kullu and about 50 km (31 mi) south of Manali. Also known as Kullu-Manali airport, Bhuntar Airport has a more than one kilometre long runway. Air India has regular flights to the airport from New Delhi.

=== Rail ===
The nearest narrow gauge railhead is at Joginder Nagar. One can travel to this railway station via Pathankot Junction, and further by a taxi or cab.

=== Road ===
Naggar is easily accessible through the buses run by HPTDC. These buses ply from Manali to Naggar via Khaknal. The road distance from Manali to Naggar via NH3 is 22 km (13.6 mi) while via Khaknal is 21 km (13 mi).

== Access ==
- Distance from Delhi: 589 km
- Distance from Shimla: 246 km
- Distance from Kullu (main town): 26 km
- Distance from Manali: 22 km

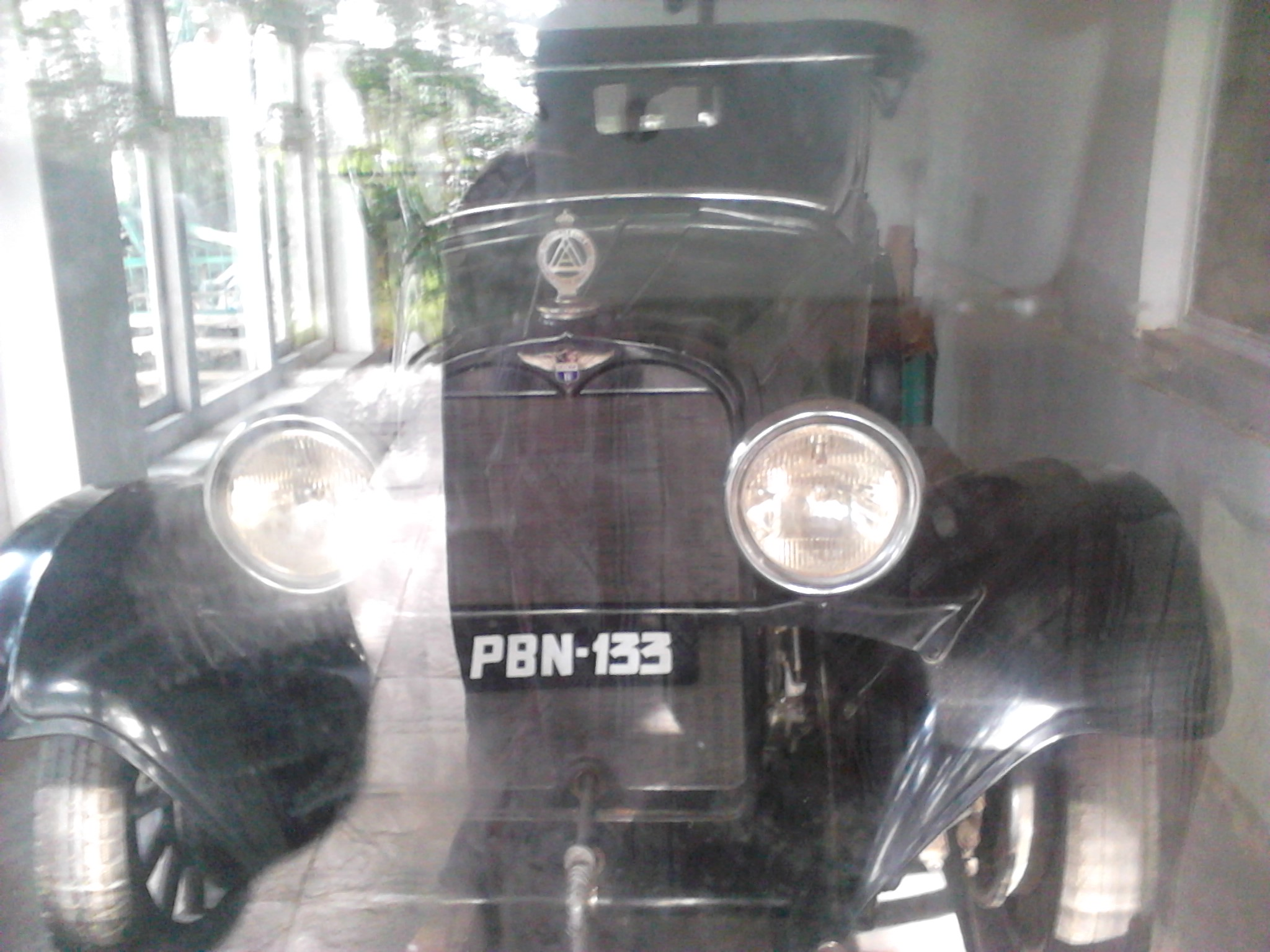
Car of Nicolas Roerich in his museum at Naggar

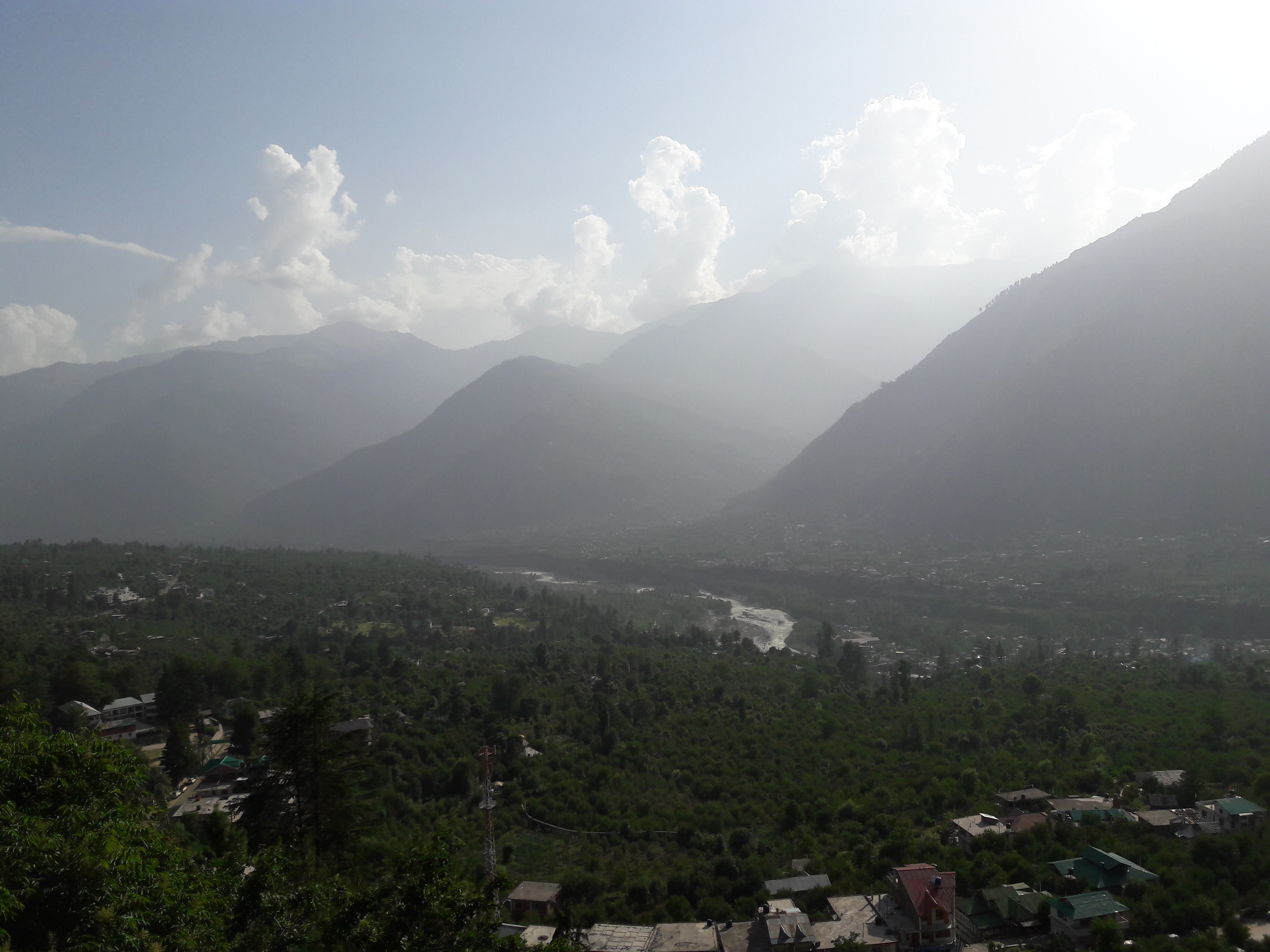
View of Beas and Kullu from the castle

== Attractions ==
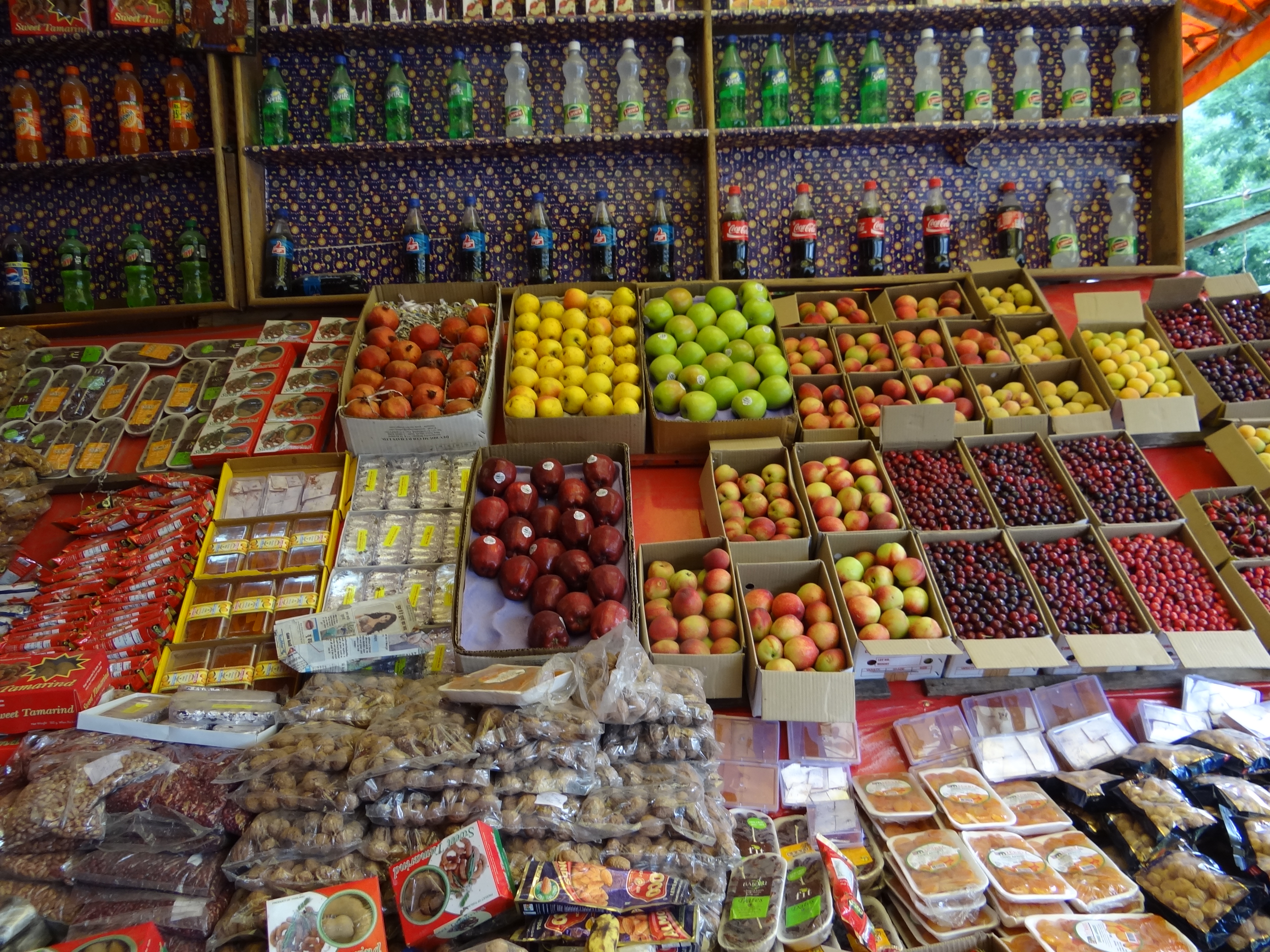
Fruit shop in Naggar

- Nicholas Roerich Art Gallery
- Gauri Shanker Temple
- Tripura Sundri Temple
- Vasuki Nag Temple
- Naggar Castle
- Krishna temple

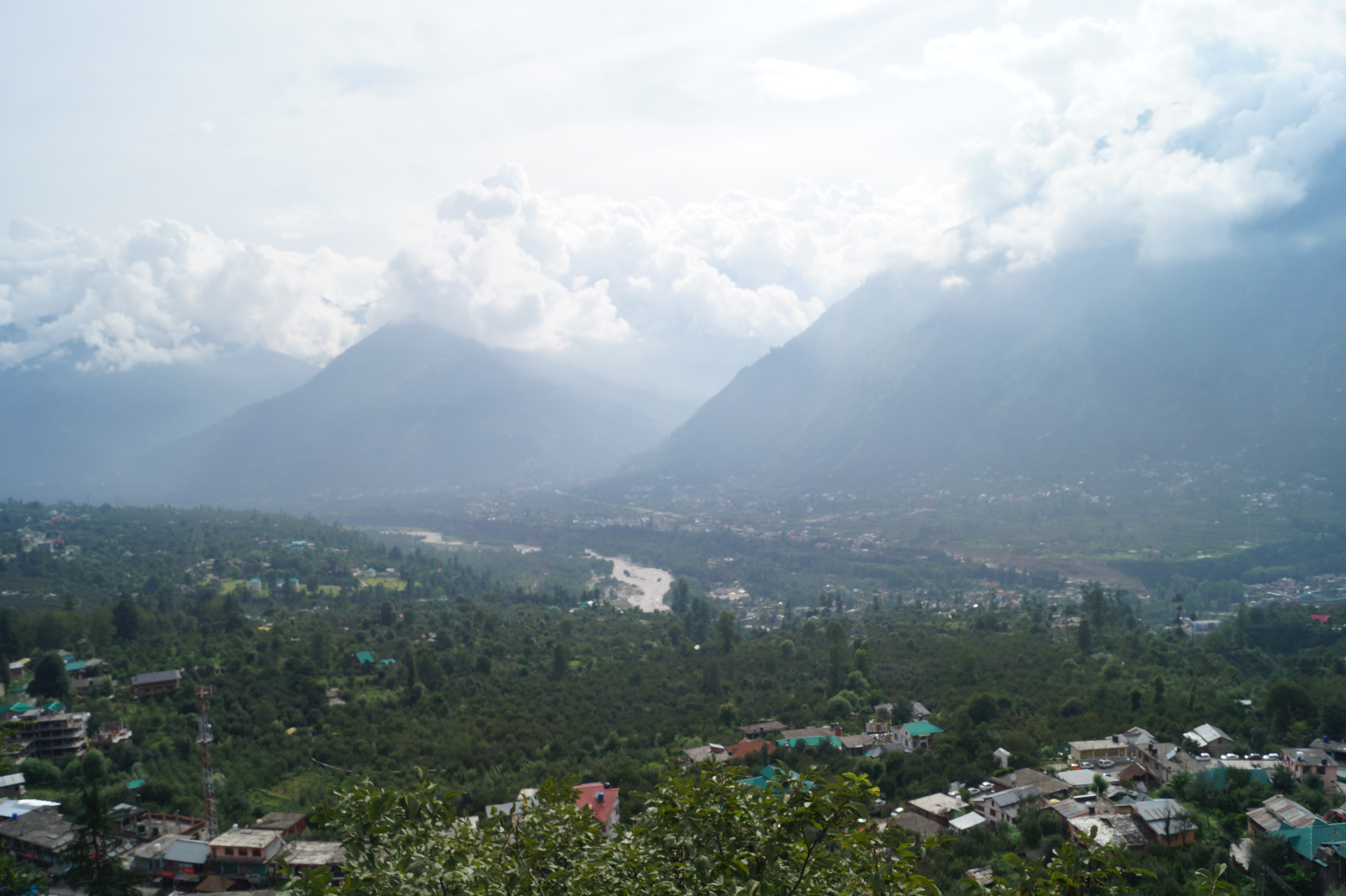
View of town from Naggar Castle
