= Tholing Monastery =

Tibetan Buddhist monastery in Tholing, Tibet, China

- Tibetan transcription(s); Tibetan: མཐོ་ལྡིང་དགོན་པ; Wylie transliteration: mtho lding dgon pa Other transcriptions: Toling; Chinese transcription(s); Simplified: 托林寺; Pinyin: Tuolin si
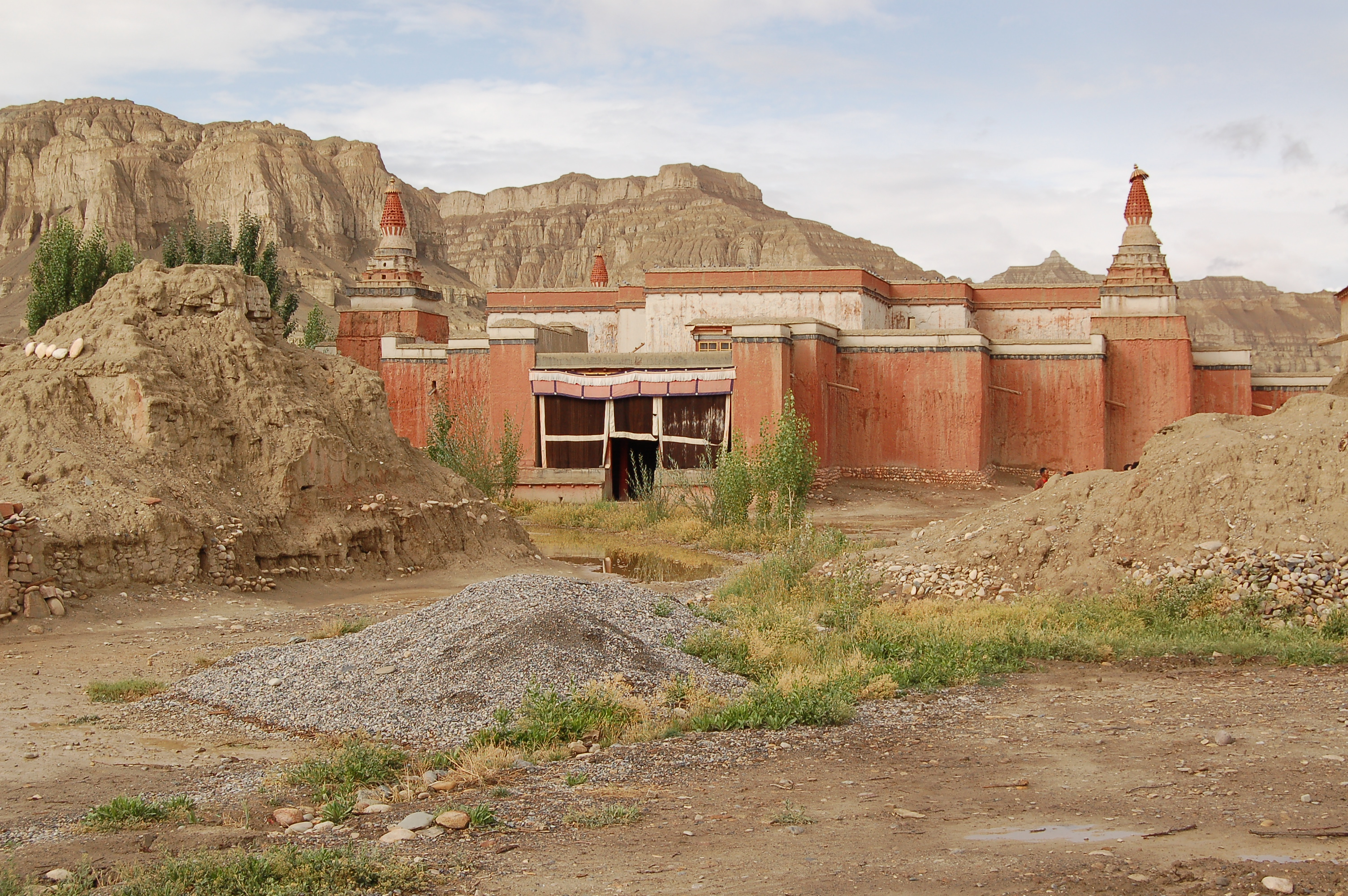
- The red temple of Tholing Monastery, built 997, surrounded by ruins.

- Location within Tibet Autonomous Region Tholing Monastery (Tibet)

Religion
- Affiliation: Tibetan Buddhism
- Sect: Kadampa
- Deity: Vairochana

Location
- Location: Tholing (Zanda), Zanda County, Ngari Prefecture, Tibet Autonomous Region
- Country: China
- Interactive map of Tholing Monastery
- Coordinates: 31°29′01″N 79°47′53″E

Architecture
- Founder: Rinchen Zangpo
- Established: 10th century

Tholing Monastery (or Toling, mtho lding dgon pa མཐོ་ལྡིང་དགོན་པ) (Tuolin si 托林寺) is the oldest monastery (or gompa) in the Ngari Prefecture of western Tibet. It is situated in Tholing (Zanda), Zanda County, near the border with India. It was built in 997 AD by Yeshe-Ö, the second King of the Guge Kingdom. In Tibetan language 'Tholing' means "hovering in the sky forever" and is reflected by the location of the monastery at an elevation of 12,400 feet (3,800 m). The complex includes three temples, the Yeshe-O Temple, the Lhakhang Karpo and the Dukhang. There are many ancient, precious, and well-preserved frescoes.

== Geography ==
The monastery is located in remote badlands of far western Tibet in Zanda County. It perches on an escarpment in the Grand Canyon along the Langchen Tsangpo (designated as Sutlej River, meaning "elephant river", in Tibet). It has a well laid out street, post office and telecommunication facilities. The isolated military installation of Zanda is nearby. Tholing is 12 miles (19 km) east of Tsaparang, which is 163 miles (262 km) from Darchen.

== History ==
The monastery is one of the first temples built at the start of the "second diffusion" of Buddhism in Tibet. It was built in 997 AD by King Yeshe-Ö, when Tholing was the capital of Guge. The king sponsored lay young men who would become noviciates of the monastery. For this purpose, he sponsored a fellowship for Rinchen Zangpo to travel to India to study and translate. He was one of 21 young monks who traveled to Vikramshila Mahavihara, a specialist institution in tantra, for training. Only two monks, Richen Zangpo and Lekpai Sherap, survived the severe climatic conditions, snake bites and diseases, and were able to return to Tibet. Rinchen Zangpo built three of the major temples at the monastery.

The king invited the Indian master Atiśa (982-1054) to Guge in 1042 AD. He spent three years in this monastery and with his immense knowledge of Buddhism, revived Buddhism in Tibet. He founded the Kadampa sect here, which adopted very austere methods. As a result, Buddhism spread from here to the whole of Tibet. Later, Atiśa's disciple was responsible for establishing the Kagyu sect with emphasis on physical and mental meditation techniques. They became the basis for Yellow Hat Sect, now the dominant Geluk sect in Tibet. In the later part of the 11th century, a Buddhist conference was arranged at Gyatsa Jhakhang (also known as Yeshe-Ö Temple) a 10th-century temple which was in ruins and has since been restored.

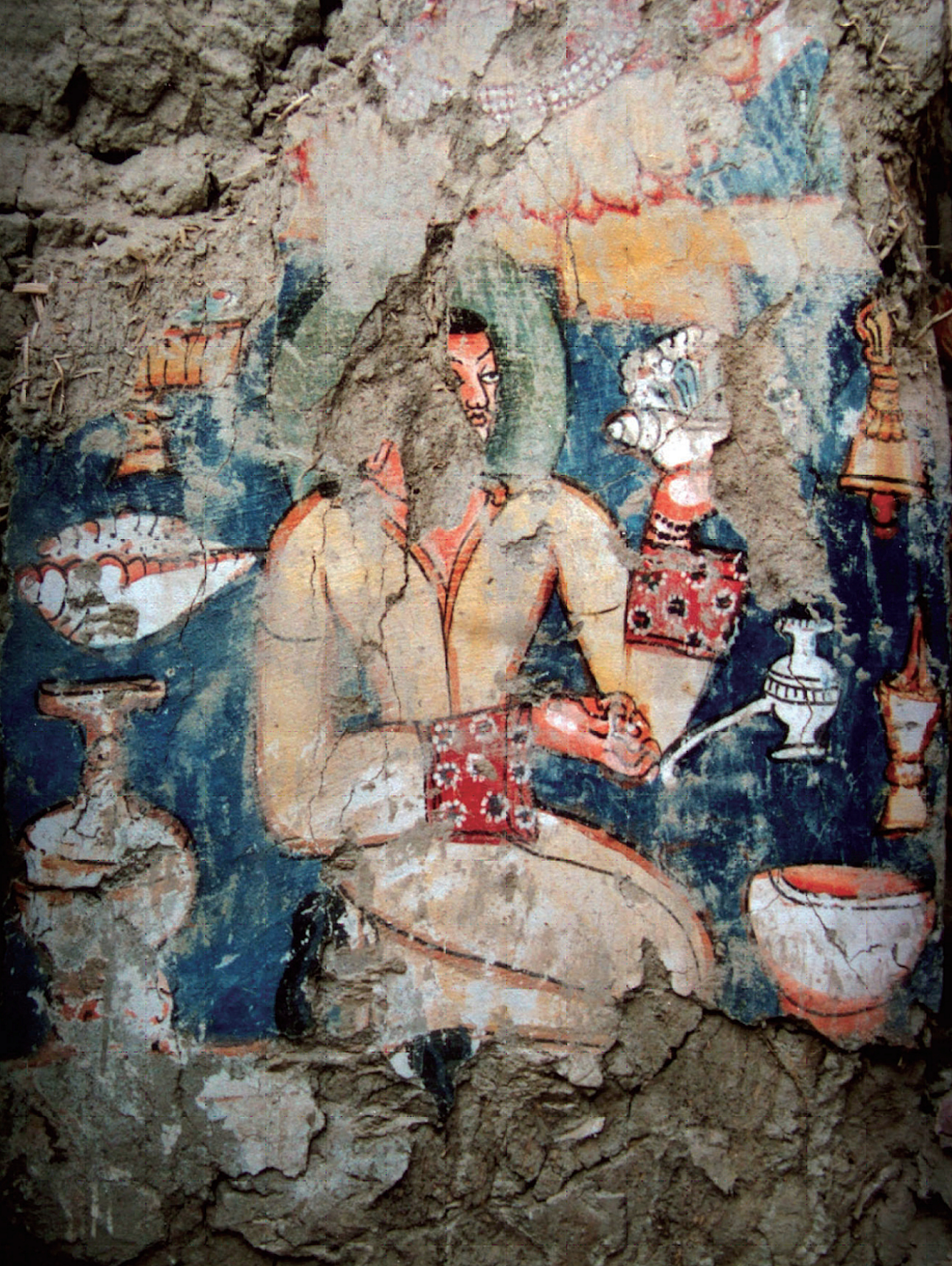
Donor depiction, presumably king Lha lde of Guge. Northwest stupa, Tholing Monastery, ca. 1025 CE.

Two chapels, dated to the fifteenth century, were used to store grains during the Cultural Revolution. Both have notable murals but those at Lakkhang Karpo are more prominent. Tholing became a portal to Tibet for Indian scholars to visit and spread religious-cultural ideas of Buddhism. Patronized by the king of Guge, this Buddhist monastery marked the evolution of ascetic Buddhism in Tibet, influenced by the Indian Buddhist scholars. In its time, the monastery was the most influential in the region. The influence of the Guge Kingdom, and the monastic center of Tholing came to be known in India from Kashmir to Assam.

Giuseppe Tucci visited the monastery in 1933 (Report by Professor Tucci on his travel to Western Tibet): "[…] the monastery of Toling is one of the oldest, richest and finest of Tibet. These documents are of unrivalled interest for the religious history of Tibet as well as for the history of Indo-Tibetan Art. […] The rain dropping through the ceiling left unrepaired for years is washing away the marvellous frescoes."

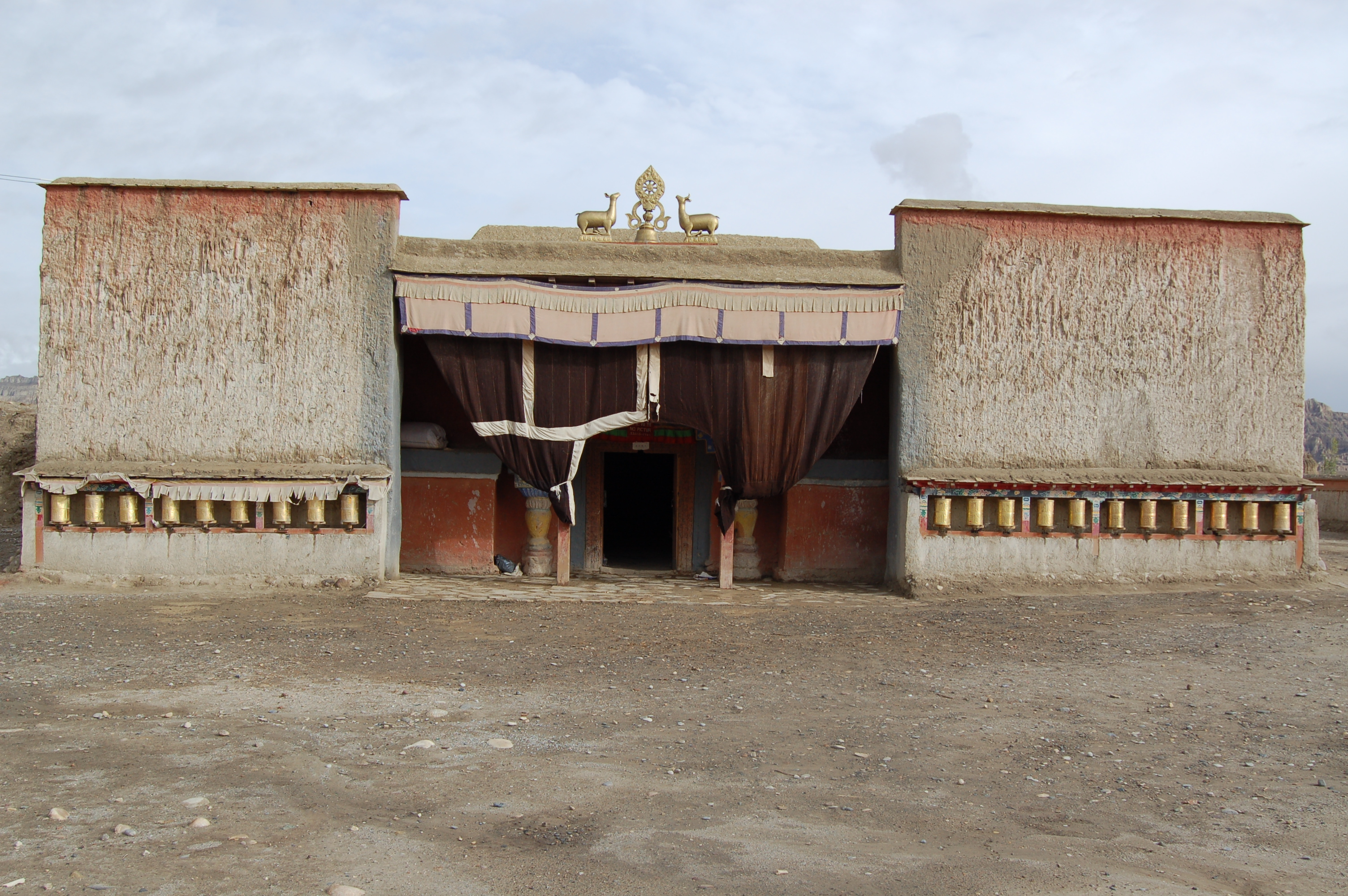
White Temple

The monastery became better known internationally, after Lama Govinda, a German Buddhist monk, accompanied by his wife, visited the monastery in 1948. He presented pictures of the monastery's decorations, statues and paintings to the outside world. During the years of the Cultural Revolution, the temples were destroyed or left to weather in the elements. In present day, the monastery is mostly in ruins. However, it still retains many images and scores of well-preserved murals which are made in the west Tibetan style.

In a recent report presented at the Seminar held in Vienna, from 6–8 April 2011, on the subject of "Art and History of the Cultural History of Western Tibet 8thto 15th century and Cultural Preservation", it is recorded that the Inner Asian Art Style has been identified in the paintings discovered from the cave temples in Zanda of Nagarri.

In the Lotsava Lhakhang in Riba, in Ngari, field research has revealed a painting of eight monks including Rinchen Zangpo of the group of monks sent to Kashmir by Yeshe O, to bring texts of scriptures of Mahayana Buddhism from there to West Tibet.

== Architecture and fittings ==
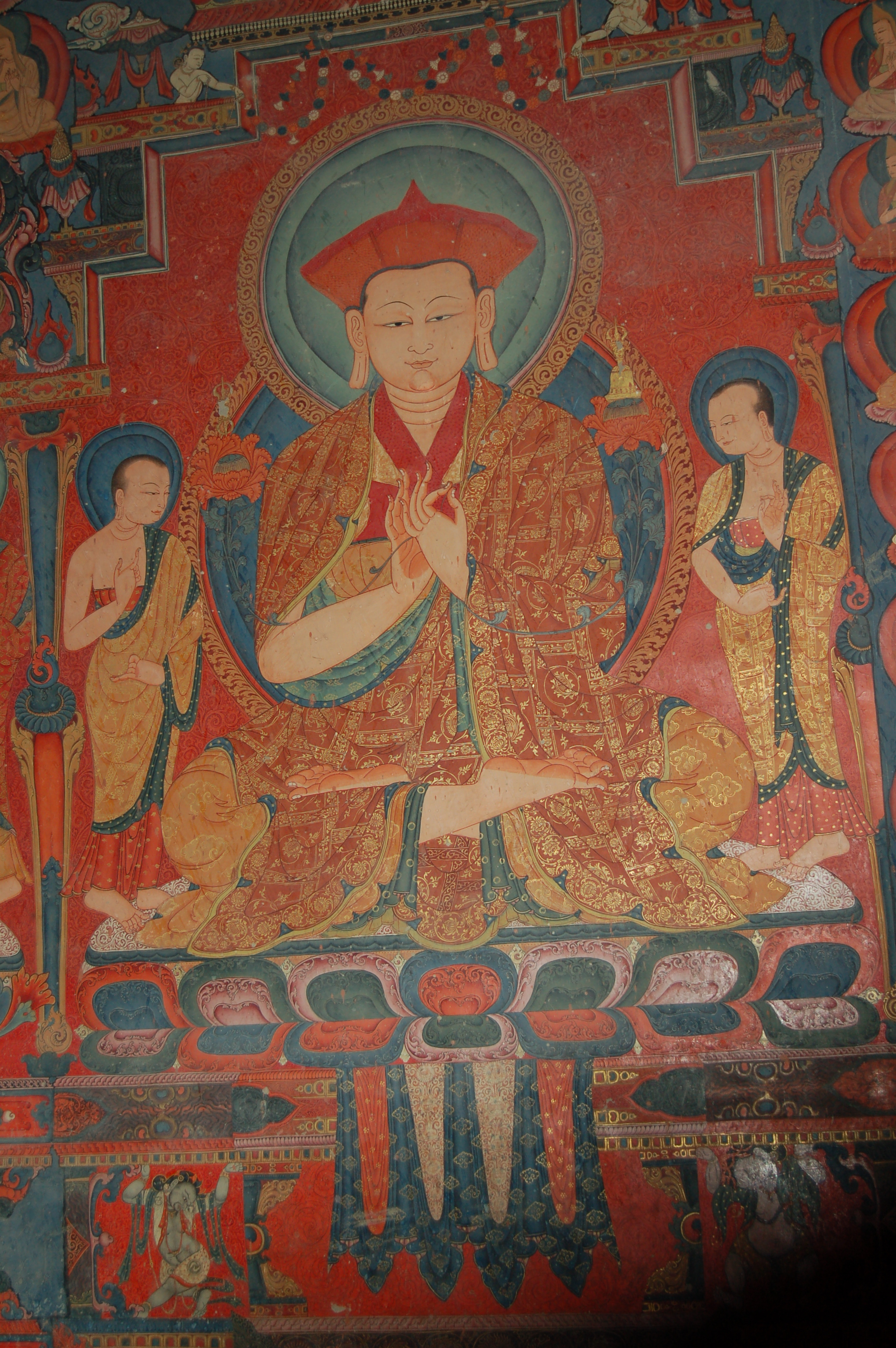
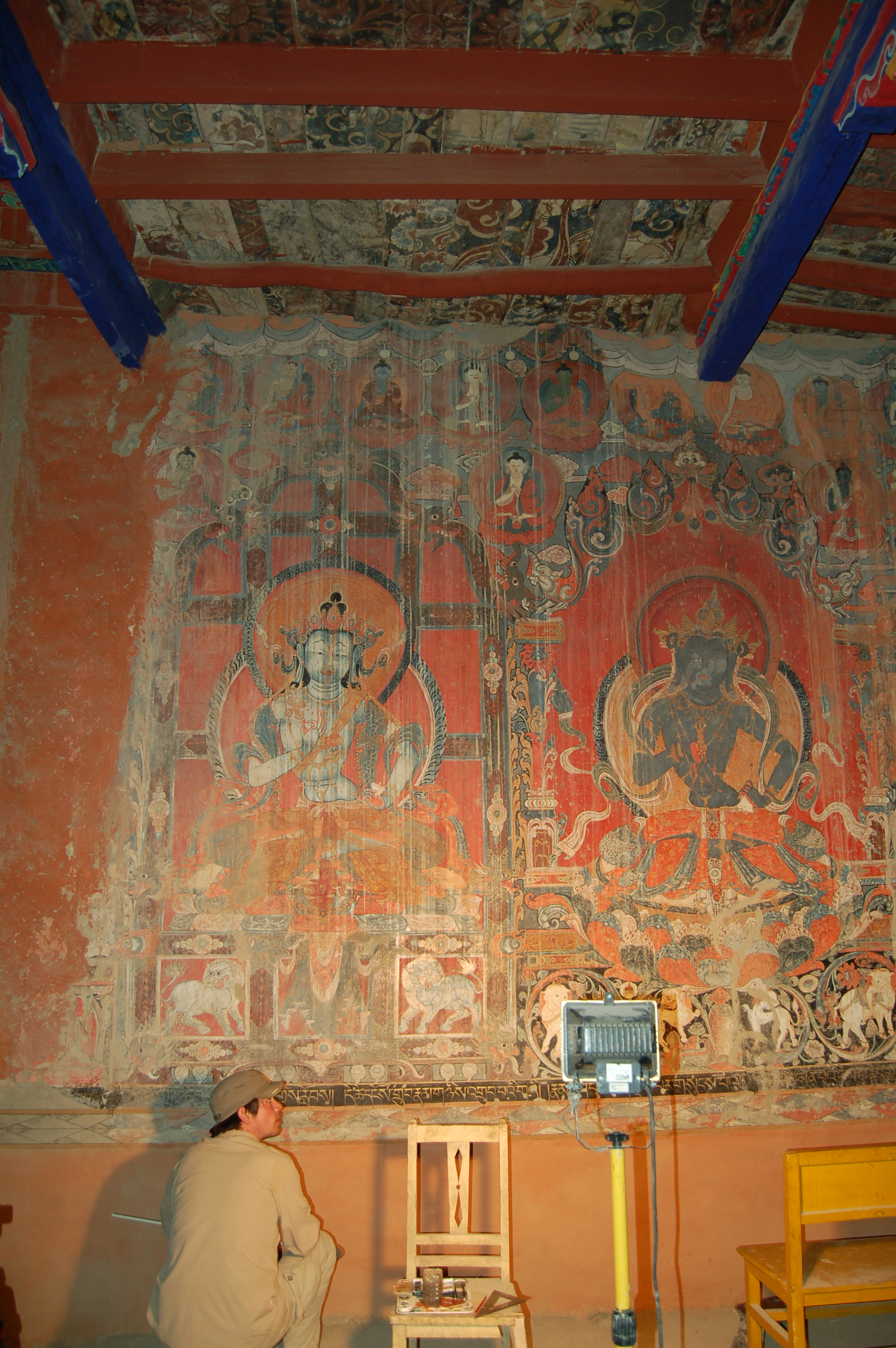
Left: Wallpainting of the White Temple. Right: Restoration in progress of wall painting in the White Temple.

The Tholing Monastery complex has many rectangular buildings. It is a walled complex facing east. Built of mud bricks, the style became the forerunner for similar temples built in the kingdom. Before the Cultural Revolution the monastery had six chapels. There are portrait paintings of Tsong Khappa, Sakya Panchen and many Buddhist monks dated to 15th and 16th centuries.

The most prominent among the extant temples, the Yeshe-Ö Temple (also Gyatsa temple, or the golden house), is built of mud-brick with red mud-brick towers. Colourful chortens are outside at each corner of this temple. Once a Vairochana image was deified here. The temple is reported to have been reconstructed after it had been demolished during the Cultural Revolution, in a mandala style. Yeshe-Ö Temple has elaborate-looking towers and its doors are painted red. During the Revolution, the images inside this temple were substantially damaged. The temple in the shape of a mandala contains several chapels. The murals in the two chapels, which are exquisite, survived demolition during the revolution as they were used as store houses for grains. There is also a museum hall in the entrance chapel. The Neten Lakhang and the Tongy Chapel, which were considered beautiful, were totally destroyed.

The Dukhang (Assembly Hall) is single-storied and has paintings of Yeshe-Ö and other important personages. These are painted with considerable detail, showing the clothing of those times. Deities deified in the walls of the hall, in a seated posture, are peaceful in appearance, and are clothed with textiles and jewelry. There are images of Gelukpa monks and a Lama. The paintings on the walls are considered to be “superb mural art.” They are traced to the 15th and 16th centuries, and are a fusion of styles from Tibet, Kashmir and Newari art of Nepal Himalayas. The Dukhang is where Rinchen Zangpo is said to have lived. Kashmiri art is seen here, as are the Dipankar, Sakyamuni and Maitreya, the Buddha images of the past, present and future. These have been rebuilt in the back chamber.

The Lhakhang Karpo (White Chapel) has a high ceiling with thin wooden pillars made of Deodar wood and is painted red. The floor is of cobblestones while the ceiling is decorated in geometric designs. The Lakhang Karpo's murals, dating to the 15th and 16th century centuries, are well preserved, including those of male figures on the right, and female figures on the left. The building now serves as storage for wood and stones.

== Gallery ==
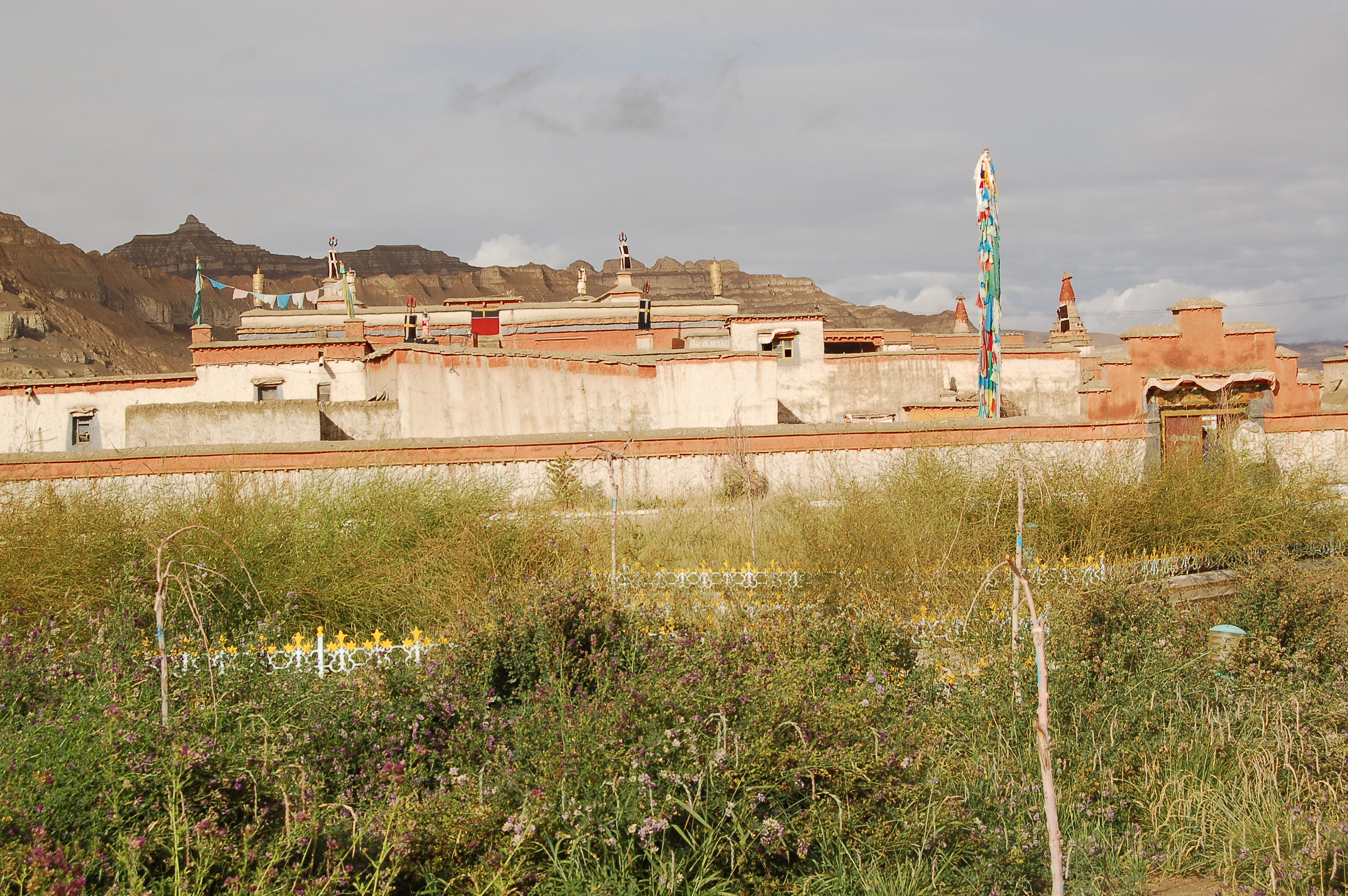
Tholing monastery in 2007

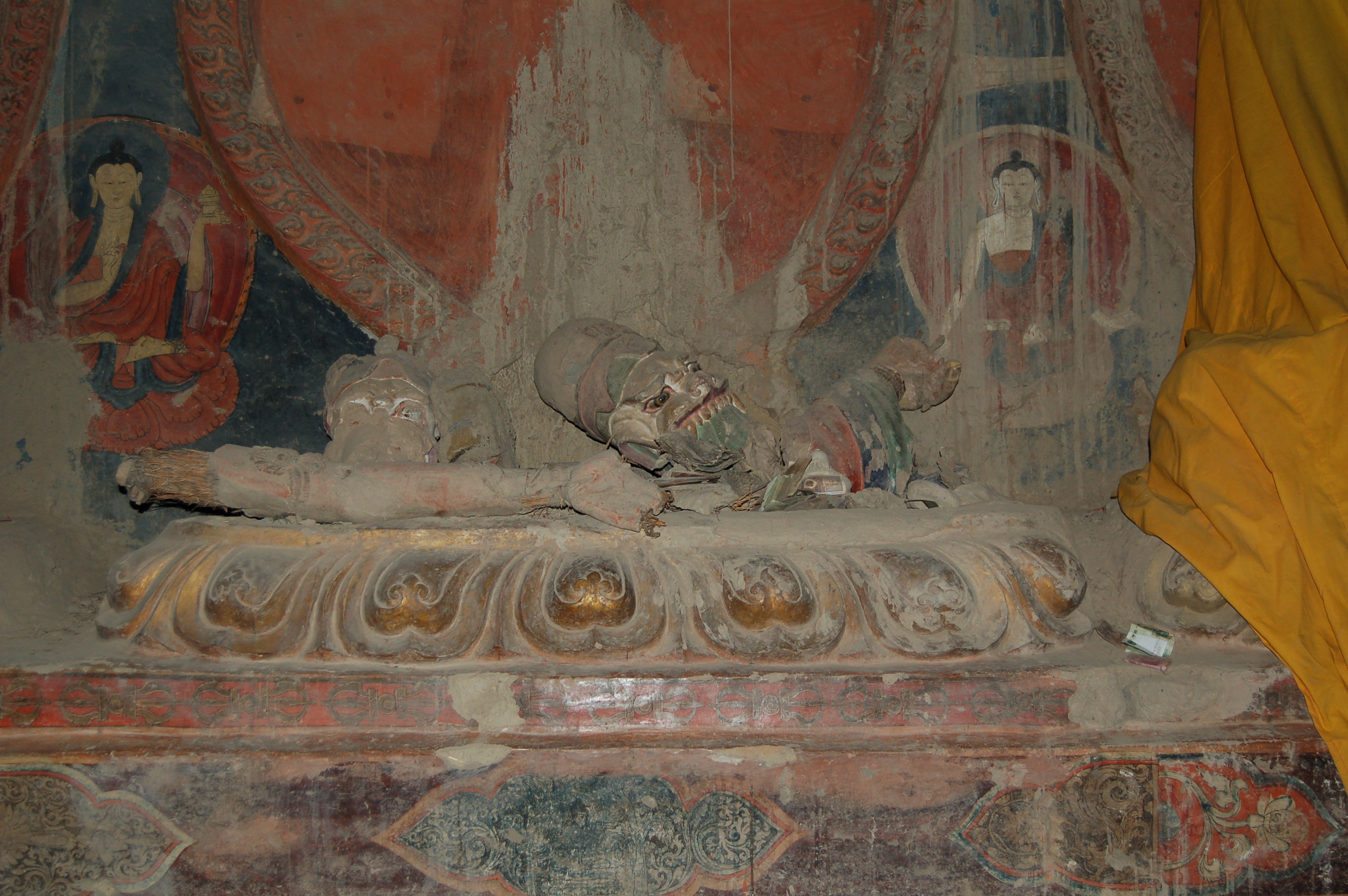
Destroyed holy monuments in Tholing Monastery.

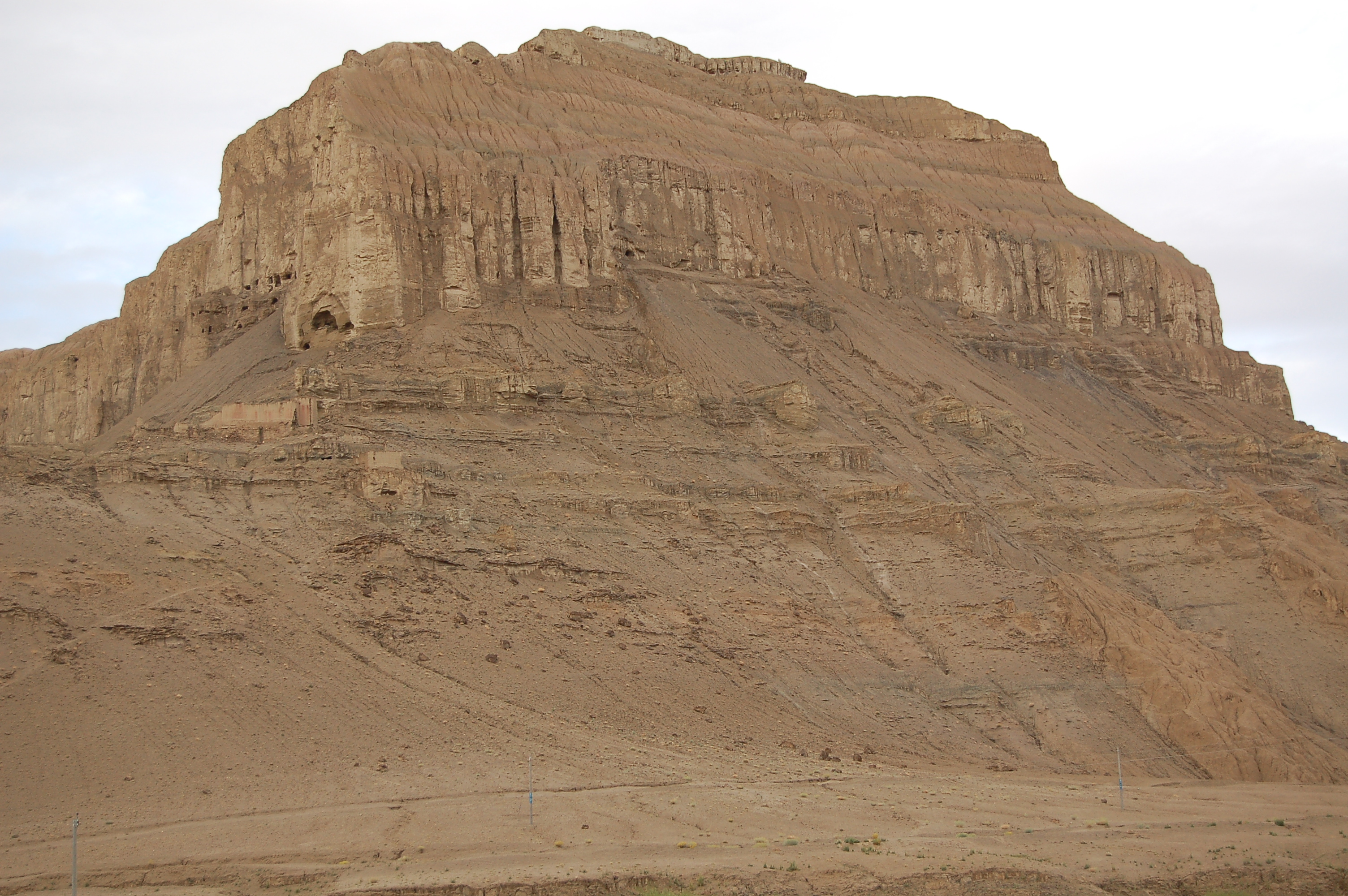
Caves near Tholing Monastery (Tibet).

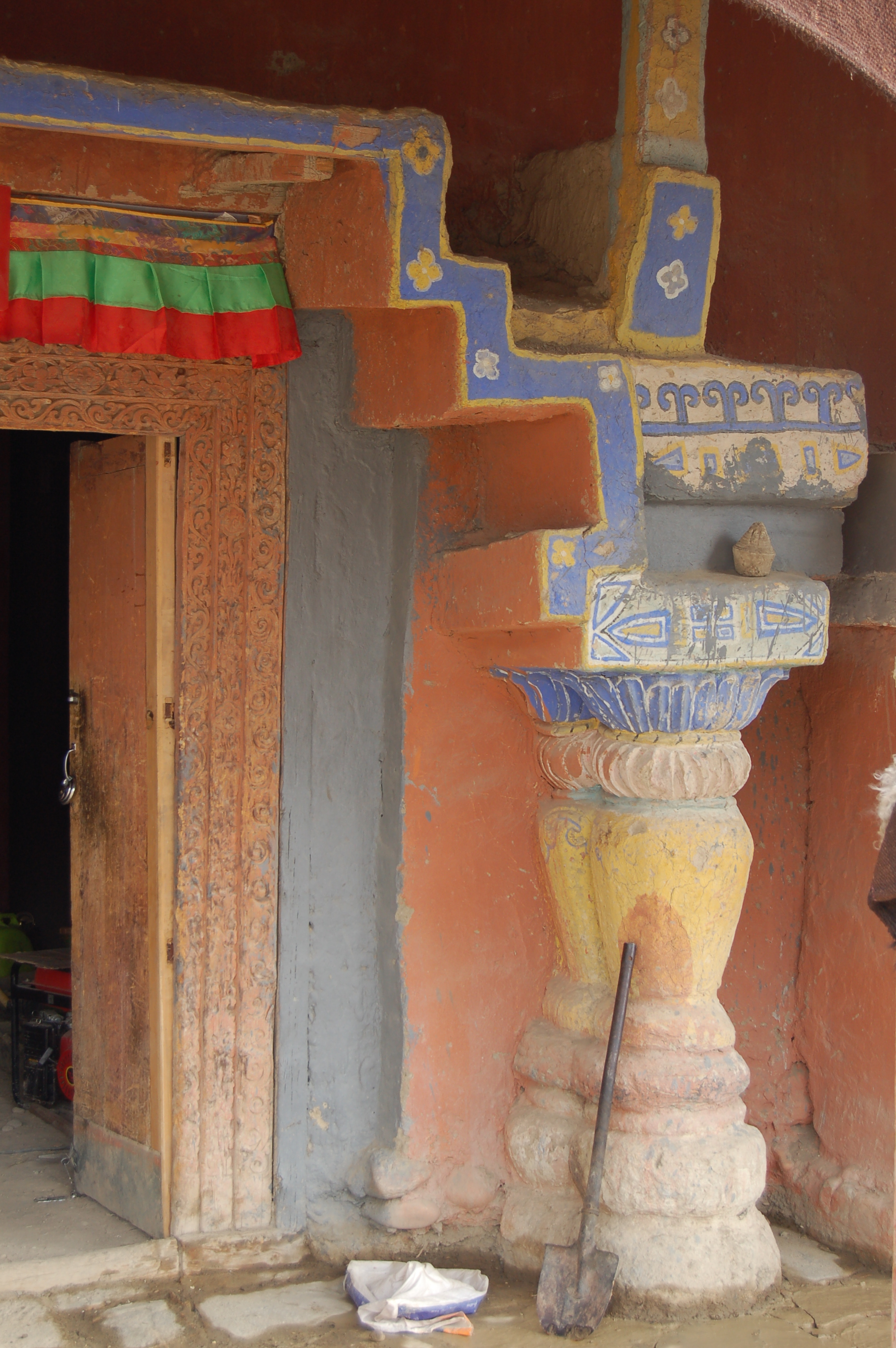
Entrance of the White Temple of Tholing Monastery.

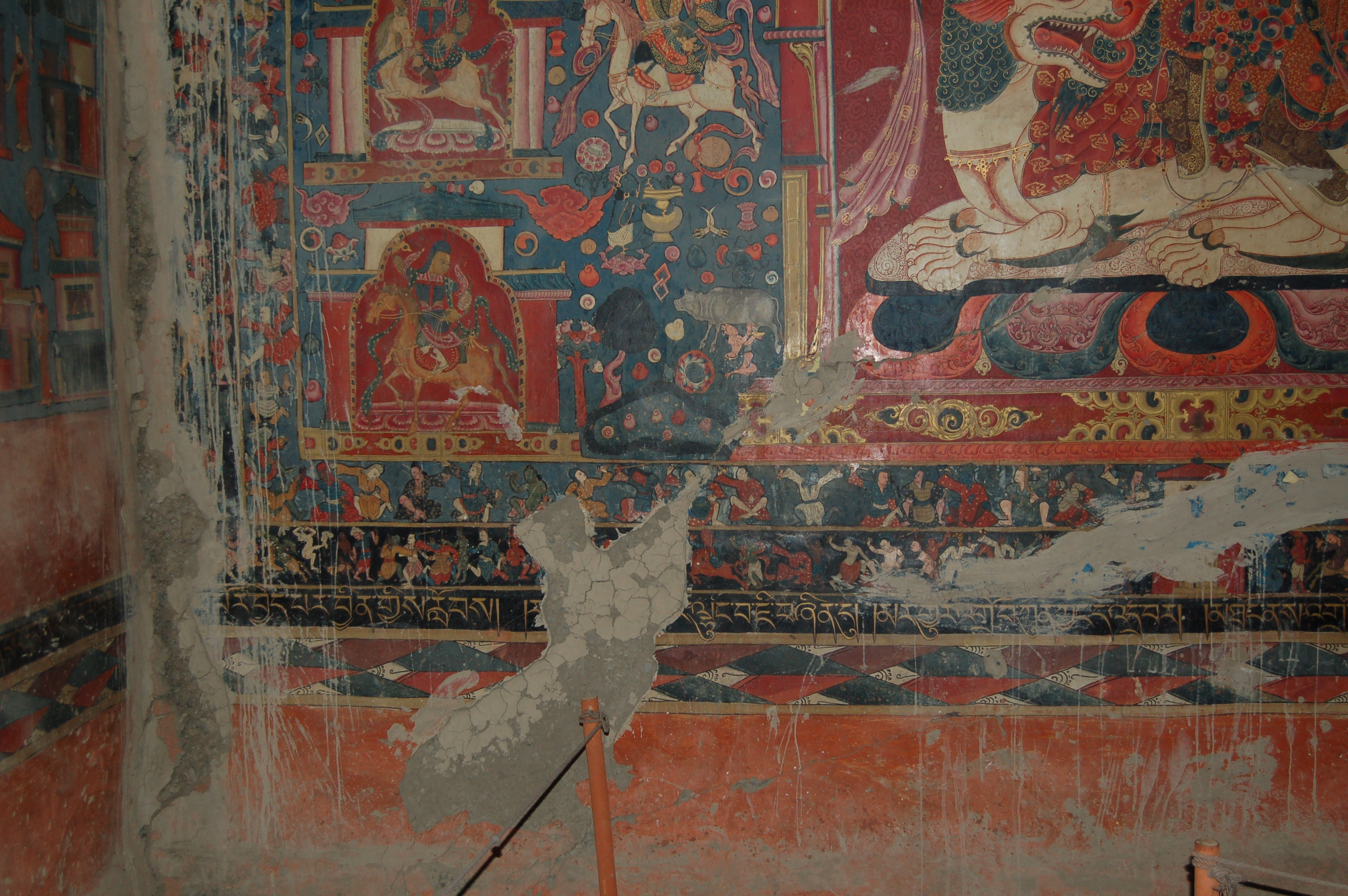
Tholing Monastery
