= Purang-Guge Kingdom =

Kingdom of Western Tibet established in the 10th century

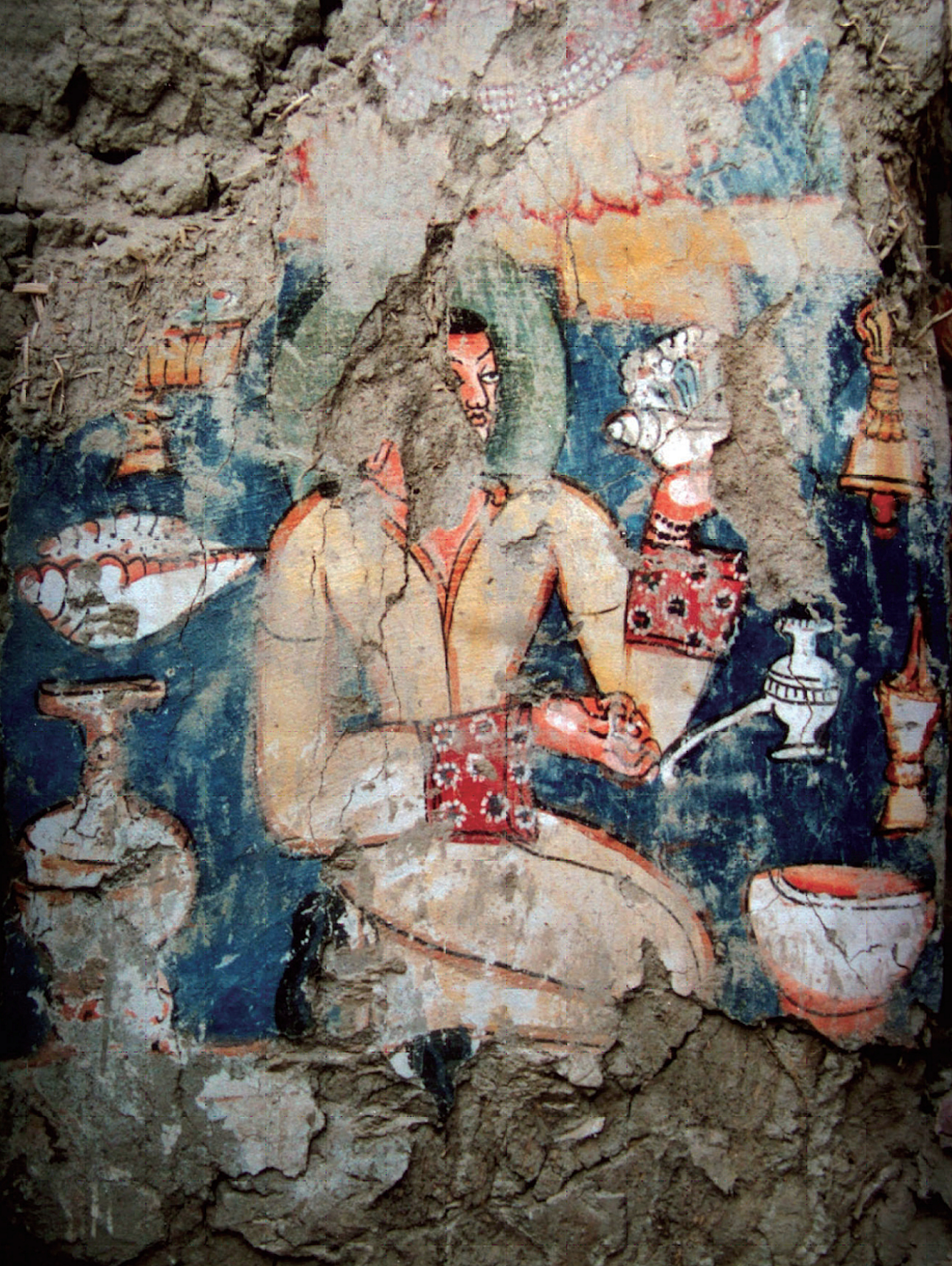
Donor depiction, presumably king Lha lde of Guge. Northwest stupa, Tholing Monastery, ca. 1025 CE.

Purang-Guge kingdom (Tibetan: པུ་ཧྲངས་གུ་གེ་, Wylie: pu hrangs gu ge) was a small Western Himalayan kingdom which was founded and flourished in the 10th century in western Tibet.

The original capital was at Purang (Tibetan: སྤུ་ཧྲེང་, Wylie: spu hreng) but was moved to Tholing in the Sutlej canyon southwest of Mount Kailash. It was divided into smaller kingdoms around the year 1100 CE. Tholing, at 12,400 feet (3,800 m), the last town before Tsaparang in the kingdom of Guge was then its capital, (163 miles from Darchen). It was founded by the great-grandson of Langdarma, who was assassinated, leading to the collapse of the Tibetan Empire.

Buddhist monuments at both Tsaparang and Tholing are now mostly in ruins except for a few statues and scores of murals in good condition, painted in the western Tibetan style.

While Langdarma persecuted Buddhism in Tibet, his descendant, King Yeshe-Ö, who ruled the Guge Kingdom in the 10th century with Tholing as its capital, was responsible for the second revival or "second diffusion" of Buddhism in Tibet; the reign of the Guge Kingdom was known more for the revival of Buddhism than for its conquests. He built Tholing Monastery in his capital city in the 997 AD along with two other temples built around the same time, Tabo Monastery in the Spiti Valley of Himachal Pradesh and Khochar Monastery (south of Purang); both these monasteries are functional.

== Geography ==
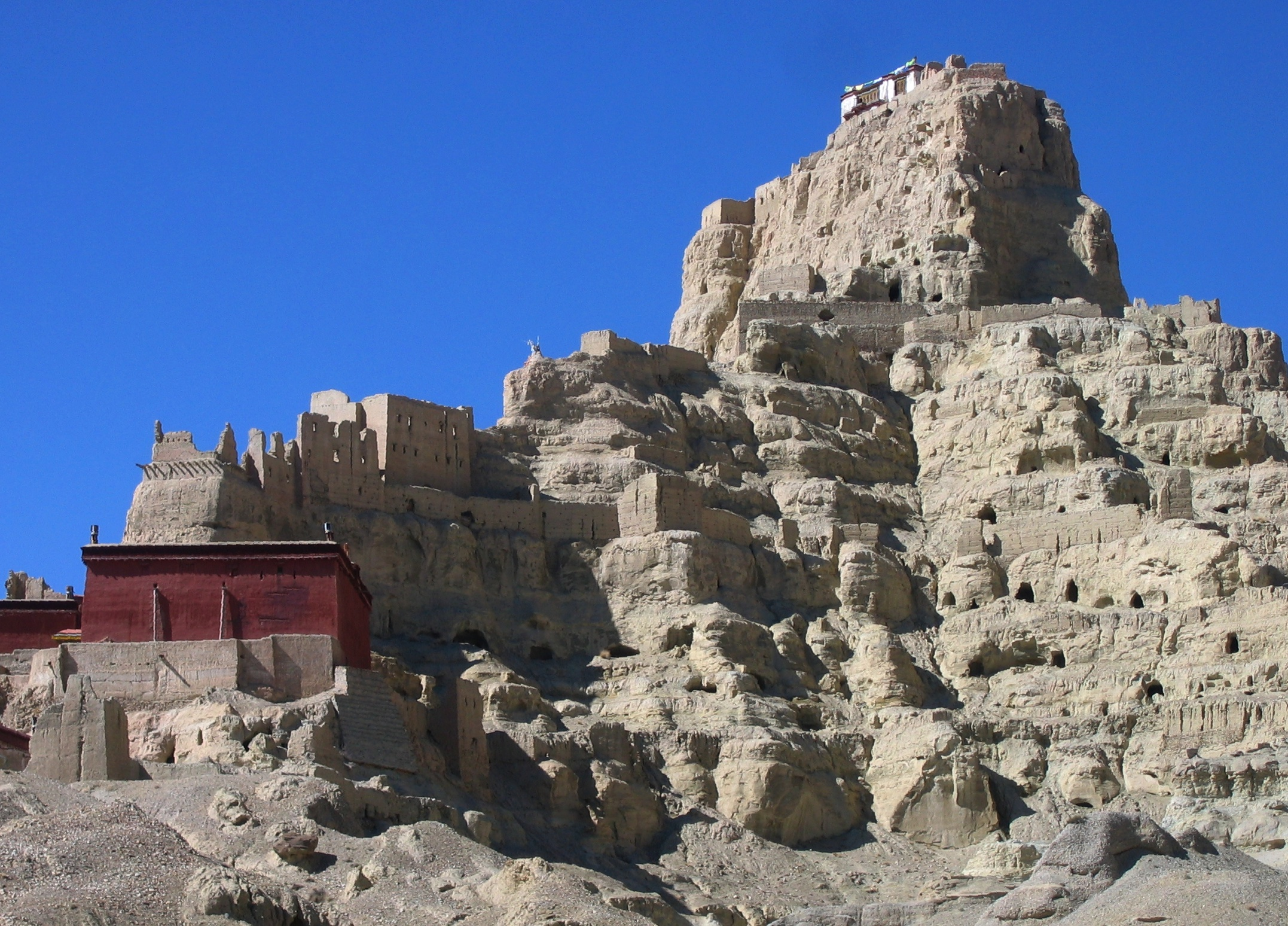
The ruins of Tsaparang, the ancient capital

The kingdom covered parts of western Tibet. Its first capital was Burang and the second one was Tsaparang, 12 miles (19 km) west of Tholing along the Sutlej. The old city of Tsaparang, now in ruins, is a "fairy tale of caves, passageways, honeycombed in a tall ridge of ancient ocean deposits". The king's palace is located on the upper part of the hills. It has a maze of chambers, and a balcony and windows looking into the valley.

Following the capture of the kingdom by Ladakh in 1630 CE, most buildings fell into decay except for a few temples which have survived in the lower flanks of the ridge. Like Tholing, their walls are studded with mural art and is now a museum. The main images are surrounded by mythical animals and floral designs.

== Early history ==
The emergence of the Purang-Guge Kingdom raised the position of western Tibet in Central Asia. It was founded in the region of Purang south of the Kailash mountains (Wylie: gangs rin po che) by descendants of the Central Tibetan monarchy, Kyide Nyimagon, and scions of other noble families such as the 'Bro clan. Preceding Purang-Guge was Zhangzhung. It is inferred from some inscriptions still visible in Tabo Monastery that non-Tibetan names noted initially in the pre-10th century period seem to have been replaced with Tibetan names once the region came under Tibetan religious influence. Some of the wooden temples in the region and the Durga temple (extensively damaged) attest to the cultist tantric practices prevailing in the area in the earlier periods but not witnessed in the monuments during the Purang-Guge reign.

After the rule of Kyide Nyimagon, Yeshe-Ö, king and monk, ruled the entire Western Himalayan region including the upper regions of Ladakh along with his brother. It was stable until it was divided up around 1100. Yeshe-Ö not only founded the temples but also encouraged the nobility of Tibet to do build temples across it. He also marginalized the esoteric forms of tantric practices (mostly by non-organised groups), which were prevalent then in Tibet and helped to consolidate the Tibetan Buddhist faith. The large number of artistic works made of bronzes are credited to Nagaraja (one of the two sons of Yeshe-Ö) collections. However, the contributions by Rinchen Zangpo (958-1055 AD) in translation of Sanskrit works and towards temple building during this period, which became part of the Tibetan Buddhist canon, are monumental.

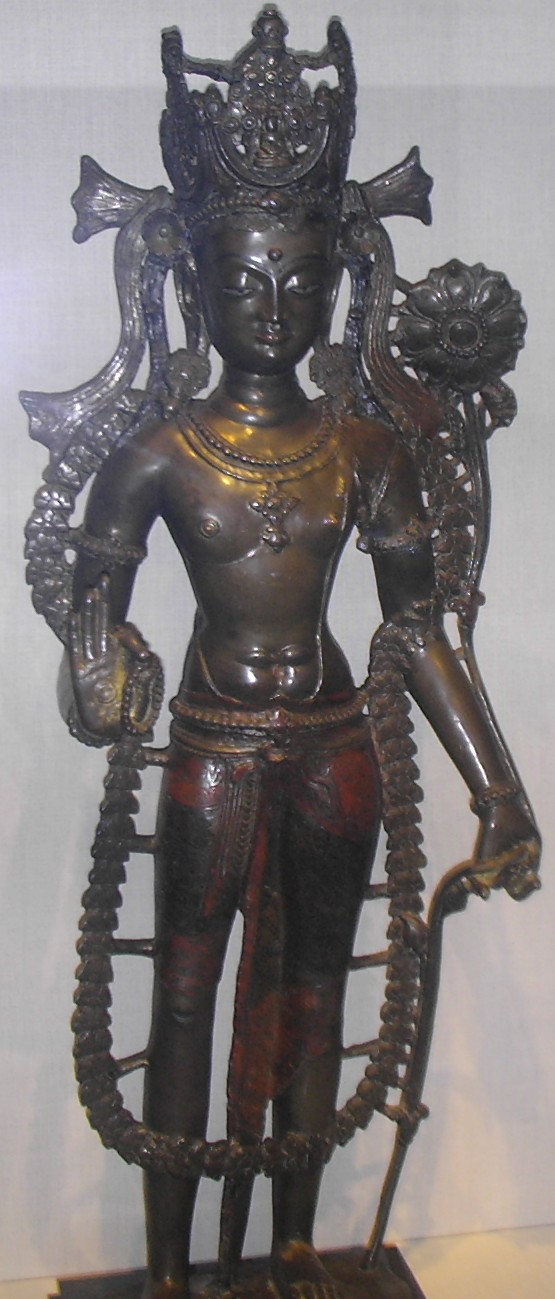
Statue of Avalokiteśvara made in the Guge Kingdom during the rule of Yeshe-Ö

In another version of the history, it is said that Langdarma was plagued by external troubles. The Uyghur Khaganate to the north collapsed under pressure from the Kyrgyz people in 840, and many displaced people fled to Tibet.

There were serious disturbances in Ü-Tsang as well. Due to the rivalries and disturbances following upon the death of Langdarma, there were serious conflicts among the rival groups claiming power, resulting in the collapse of the Tibetan Empire. This period was known traditionally as the Era of Fragmentation, dominated by rebellions against the remnants of imperial Tibet and the rise of regional warlords ensued.

As the royal claimants were minors, the issues did not escalate and a status quo was maintained until civil war broke out in 866. In some accounts it is said that Tsaparang was made the capital of Guge by Namde Ösung (Wylie: gnam lde 'od srung), one of the sons of Langdarma. Some other accounts mention that two of Langdarma's grandsons fled to Western Tibet around 919. The eldest one, Kyide Nyimagon (Wylie: skyid lde nyi ma mgon), established himself at Purang and conquered a large area including Maryul (Ladakh) and parts of the Spiti Valley. After his death, his kingdom was split up between his three sons into the kingdoms of Maryul, Guge–Purang and Zanskar.

However, in Central Tibet, the scions of the royal family became local chiefs, each with smaller areas under their control.

== Guge Kingdom ==
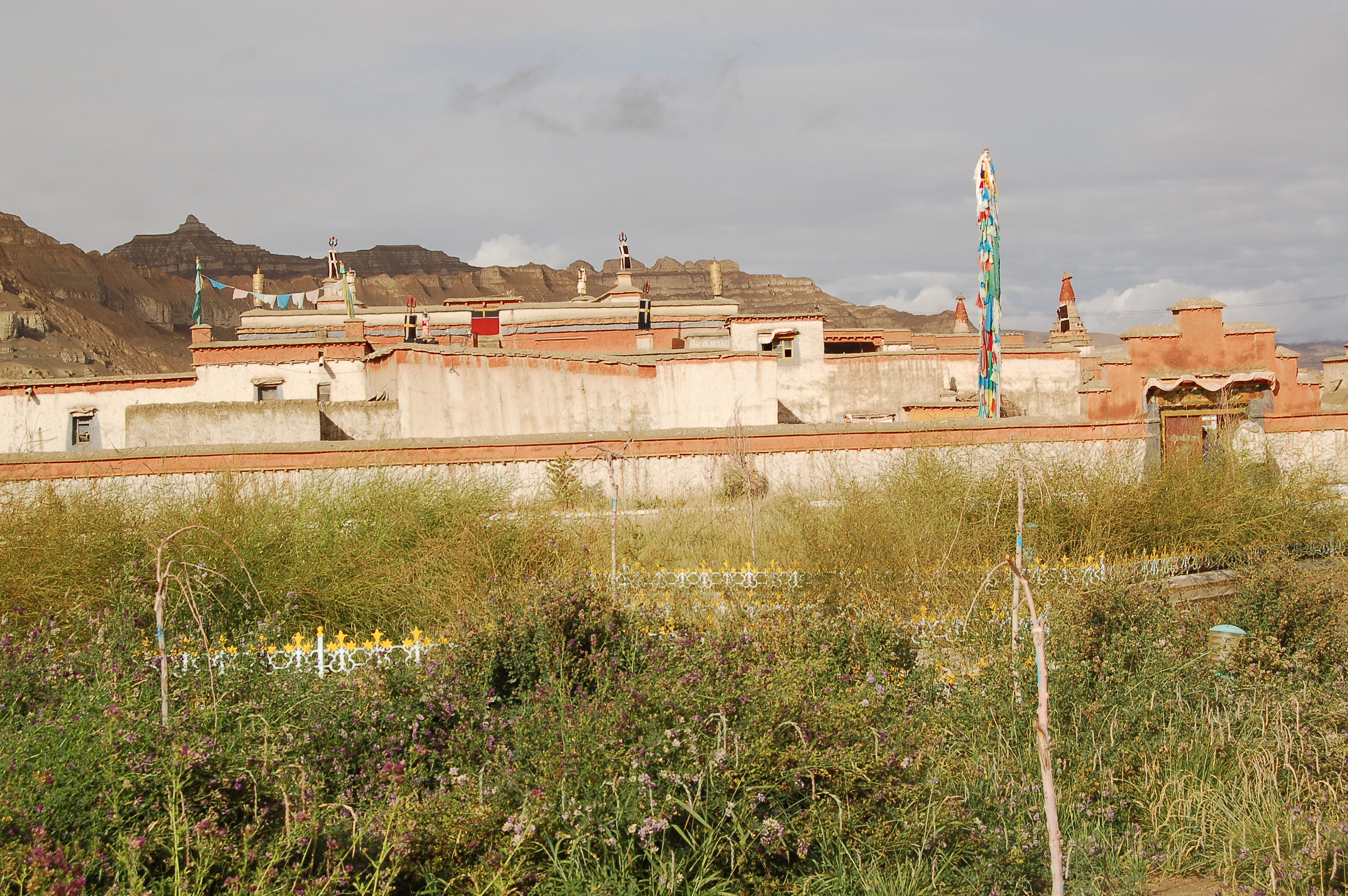
View of Tholing Monastery, built in the time of the Guge Kingdom.

The Guge Kingdom was established by Chogyal Yeshe-Ö in AD 967, with Tholing as the capital. Under his reign, Tholing became an important centre for Indian scholars to visit and spread Buddhist religion and culture. Before that, at the initiative of the King, specially chosen batch of 21 young and bright students from the monastery were sent to India and Kashmir to be trained in Buddhism and to translate Sanskrit texts on religion and the Tibetan language and to study at Vikramashila, a specialist institution in tantra. Unfortunately 19 of them could not survive the climate, snake bites and diseases and only two monks, Rinchen Zangpo and Lekpai Sherap, survived.

During the reigns of the second and third kings, Indian Buddhist religious, artistic, architectural, scriptural and philosophical traditions permeated Tibet through Guge; this is known as the "Second Advancement".

The emphasis during the Yeshe-Ö rule was religious education, religious architecture and religious reform. He raised a young band of monks. He dressed himself like a monk and resided in the Tholing Monastery. In 1042, the third king invited the Indian master Atiśa to Guge. Later in the 11th century a Buddhist conference was arranged at Gyatsa Jhakhang (also known as Yeshe-Ö Temple), an original 10th-century temple now in ruins. The Indian monk Atisha, stayed for three years at Tholing and became a famous master in Tibet. During his stay in Tholing, the famous Buddhist work he wrote was "Lamp of The Path to Enlightenment." He along with the first Abbot, Bin-chen Bzang-po, of Tholing were responsible for introducing the Indian arts to Tibet, particularly the murals depicting a fusion of several Indian styles. The famous murals are the "16 Vajara Dancers" and "The Birth of Sakyamuni," the founder of Buddhism. The monasteries were built in Tsaparang and Tholing with mud bricks, along with other temples and monasteries. The influence of the Guge Kingdom, particularly the monastic center of Tholing, was felt from Kashmir to Assam in India also.

Guge's capital was shifted to Tsaparang by 15th century. History also records that from 1624 to 1635 an effort was made by a mission headed by António de Andrade, a Portuguese Jesuit, to convert Guge to Roman Catholicism and some locals became Catholics and a church was also built. However, as result of local resentment at the Guge ruler's persecution of Buddhism monks, they approached the kingdom of Ladakh to intervene. The Ladakhis, who had sought for many years to incorporate Guge into their domain, invaded the kingdom, expelling most of the Christians and destroying the church.

In 1679–80, Tsaparang and the Guge kingdom were conquered by the Lhasa-based kingdom under the leadership of the 5th Dalai Lama, causing considerable damage. During the Cultural Revolution, further destruction of the statues and murals in both chapels by the Red Guards followed. Despite this destruction, many magnificent frescoes have survived.
