= Daba, Zanda County =

Daba མདའ་འབབ་ཤང
- Township
- Danbab Township
- Location in Tibet
- Coordinates: 31°13′44″N 79°55′29″E
- Country: People's Republic of China
- Autonomous region: Tibet
- Prefecture: Ngari Prefecture
- County: Zanda County
- Time zone: UTC+8 (China Standard)

Daba (Tibetan: མདའ་པ, Wylie: mda' pa; Chinese: 达巴乡; pinyin: Dábā Xiāng) or Danbab (Tibetan: མདའ་འབབ་ཤང, Wylie: mda' 'bab shang, ZWPY: Danbab Xang) is a township under the administration of Zanda County in the Tibet region of China, centred at the Daba village.

== Geography ==
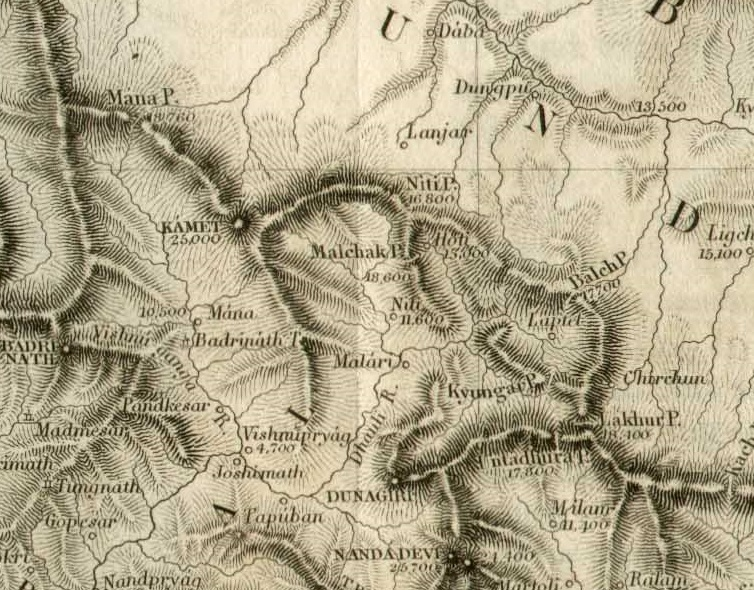
Daba mared towards the top, with respect to the border with India

The Daba village is on the bank of the Daba Chu river, a tributary of the Sutlej River. The township of Daba spans both the banks of the Sutlej river, up to the Burang County and the Manasarovar region. It stretches to the south until the Indian border.

Daba village and township are close to the Indian border. On the Indian side of the border are Garhwal and Kumaon regions of India's Uttarakhand state. The Niti Pass and the Kungri Bingri Pass have served as the main historical trade routes. Since 1954, China has disputed the Indian control over the Barahoti region along the border.

As of 2020, the Daba township has two other villages in addition to Daba:

- Dongbo Village (མདོང་པོ, 东波村)
- Kyunglung Village (ཁྱུང་ལུང, 曲龙村)

== History ==
In the mid-19th century, Henry Strachey mentioned that Daba Dzong was one of the two dzongs in the Guge region of Ngari, the other being Tsaparang. The Tibetan governor at Daba was called kharpön, subordinate to the garpön stationed at Gartok. He was also referred to as Deba or Deva at other times.

British explorer William Moorcroft travelled to Daba in 1812, via the Niti Pass and then proceeded to Gartok after receiving permission to do so. The surveyor of Garhwal and Kumaon, W. J. Webb, met traders from Daba while surveying the vicinity of the Niti Pass in 1819. He offered to establish a trade mart for Daba traders on the Indian side but was told that it required a permission from the "viceroy of Lhasa".

During the Dogra–Tibetan War, Zorawar Singh's forces occupied the Daba Dzong along with all other fortifications in Ngari. They were eventually repulsed by the Tibetan forces and fled to Kumaon.

During 17th century, Fateh Shah of Garhwal invaded Tibet, where his sword and armour were preserved in the monastery at Daba for a long time. The ruler of Daba refused to pay its taxes to the Fateh Shah so Garhwal again conquered Daba. Some areas of Tibet accepted dominance of Pawar kings of Garhwal.
