= Guge =

Historical kingdom in Western Tibet

Coordinates: 31°28′55″N 79°48′01″E

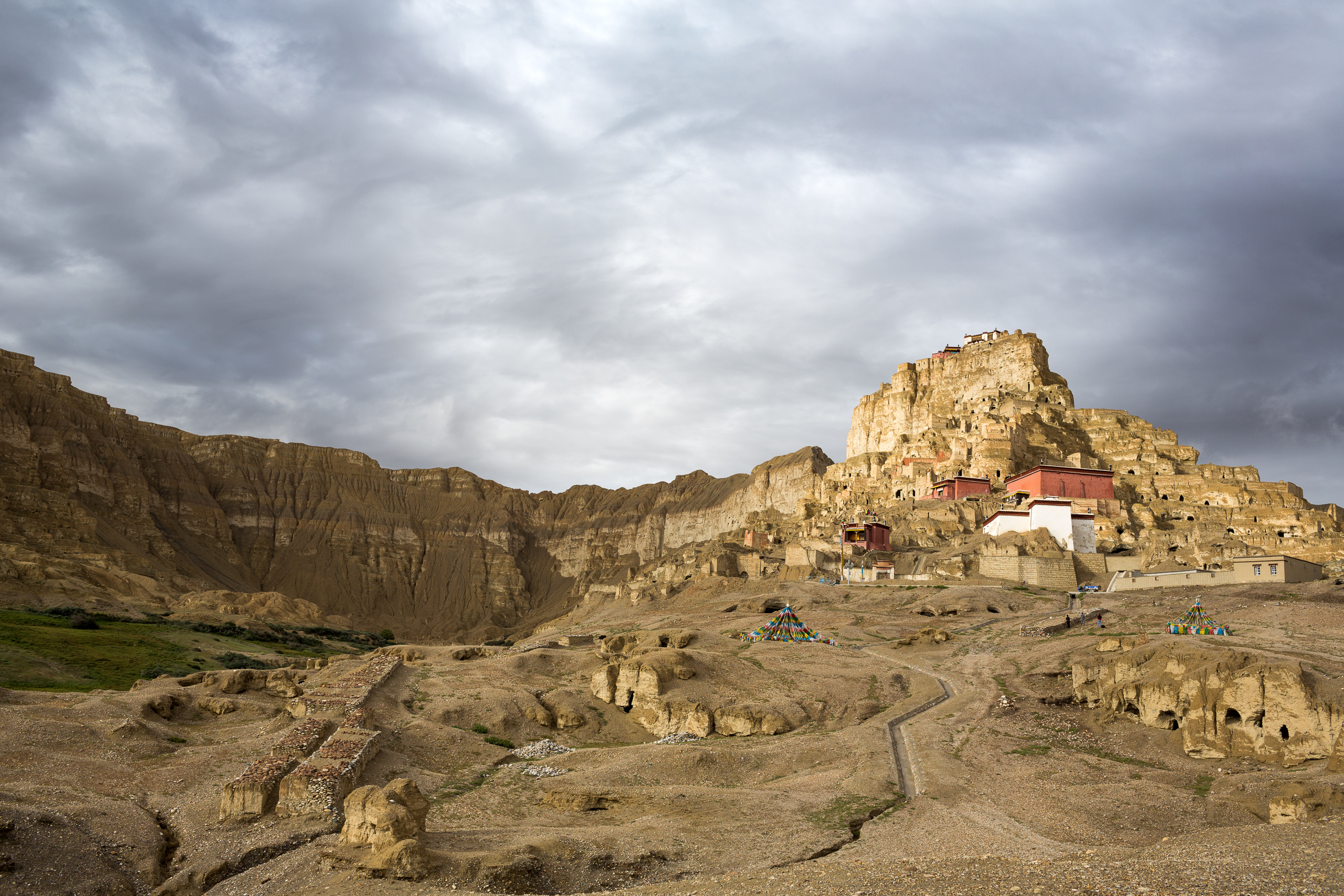
- Ruins of the Guge capital at Tsaparang

- Location of Guge and neighbouring polities in the early 1000s.
- Capital: Tsaparang
- Religion: Tantric Hinduism, Tibetan Buddhism, Shamanism, Bon
- Government: Monarchy
  - c. 910–c. 930: Kyide Nyimagon (first)
Preceded by	Succeeded by
Era of Fragmentation	Ladakh
- Today part of: China; India; Nepal

Guge (Tibetan: གུ་གེ་, Wylie: gu ge) was an ancient dynastic kingdom in Western Tibet. The kingdom was centered in present-day Zanda County, Ngari Prefecture, Tibet Autonomous Region. At various points in history after the 10th century AD, the kingdom held sway over a vast area including south-eastern Zanskar, Kinnaur district, and Spiti Valley, either by conquest or as tributaries. The ruins of the former capital of the Guge kingdom are located at Tsaparang in the Sutlej valley, not far from Mount Kailash and 1,200 miles (1,900 km) west from Lhasa.

== History ==
=== Founding ===
Guge was founded in the 10th century. Its capitals were located at Tholing and Tsaparang. Kyide Nyimagon, a great-grandson of Langdarma, the last monarch of the Tibetan Empire, fled to Ngari (West Tibet) from the insecure conditions in Ü-Tsang in 910. He established a kingdom around 912, annexing Purang and Guge. He established his capital in Guge.

Nyimagon later divided his lands into three parts. The king's eldest son Palgyigon became ruler of Maryul (Ladakh), his second son Trashigon (bKra shis mgon) received Guge-Purang, and the third son Detsukgon received Zanskar.

=== Second diffusion of Buddhism ===
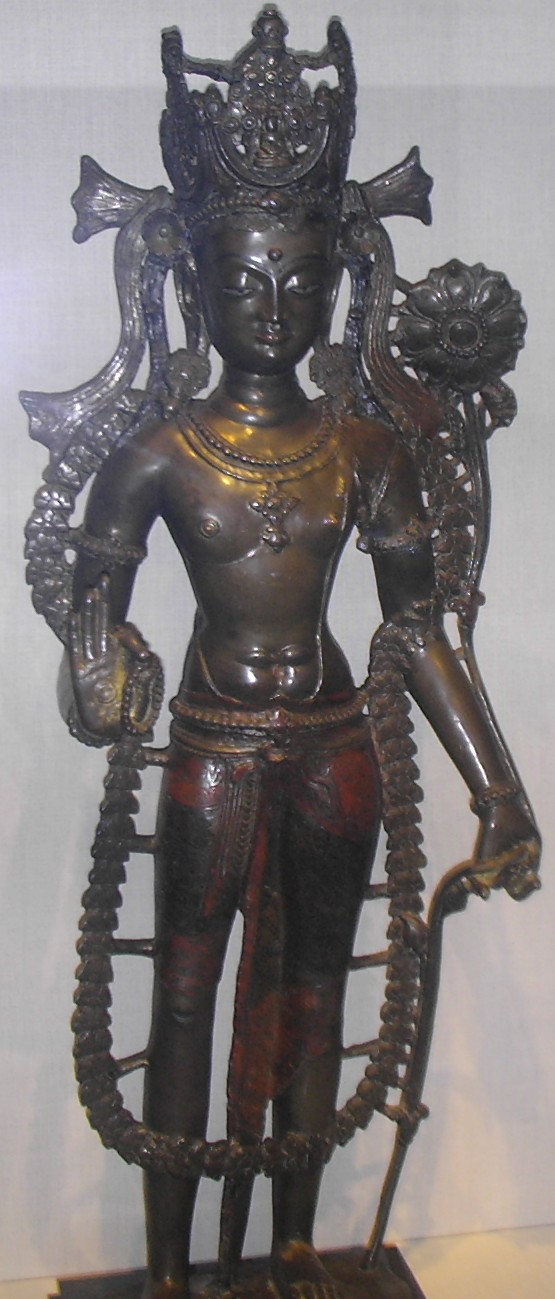
A brass alloy statue of the bodhisattva Avalokiteśvara, Guge, c. 1050 CE.

Trashigon was succeeded by his son Srong nge or Yeshe-Ö (Ye shes 'Od) (947–1024 or (959–1036), who was a renowned Buddhist figure. In his time a Tibetan lotsawa from Guge called Rinchen Zangpo (958–1055), after having studied in India, returned to his homeland as a monk to promote Buddhism. Together with the zeal of Yeshe-Ö, this marked the beginning of a new diffusion of Buddhist teachings in western Tibet. In 988 Yeshe-Ö took religious vows and left kingship to his younger brother Khor re.

According to later historiography, the Turkic Karluks (Gar log) took the Yeshe-Ö prisoner in a war. The episode has a prominent place in Tibetan history writing. The Karluks offered to set him free if he renounced Buddhism, which he refused to do. They then demanded his weight in gold to release him. His junior kinsman Byang chub 'Od visited him in his prison with a small retinue, but Yeshe-Ö admonished him not to use the gold at hand for ransom, but rather to invite the renowned Mahayana sage Atiśa (982–1054). Yeshe-Ö eventually died in prison from age and poor treatment. The story is historically debated since it contains chronological inconsistencies.

=== Successions ===
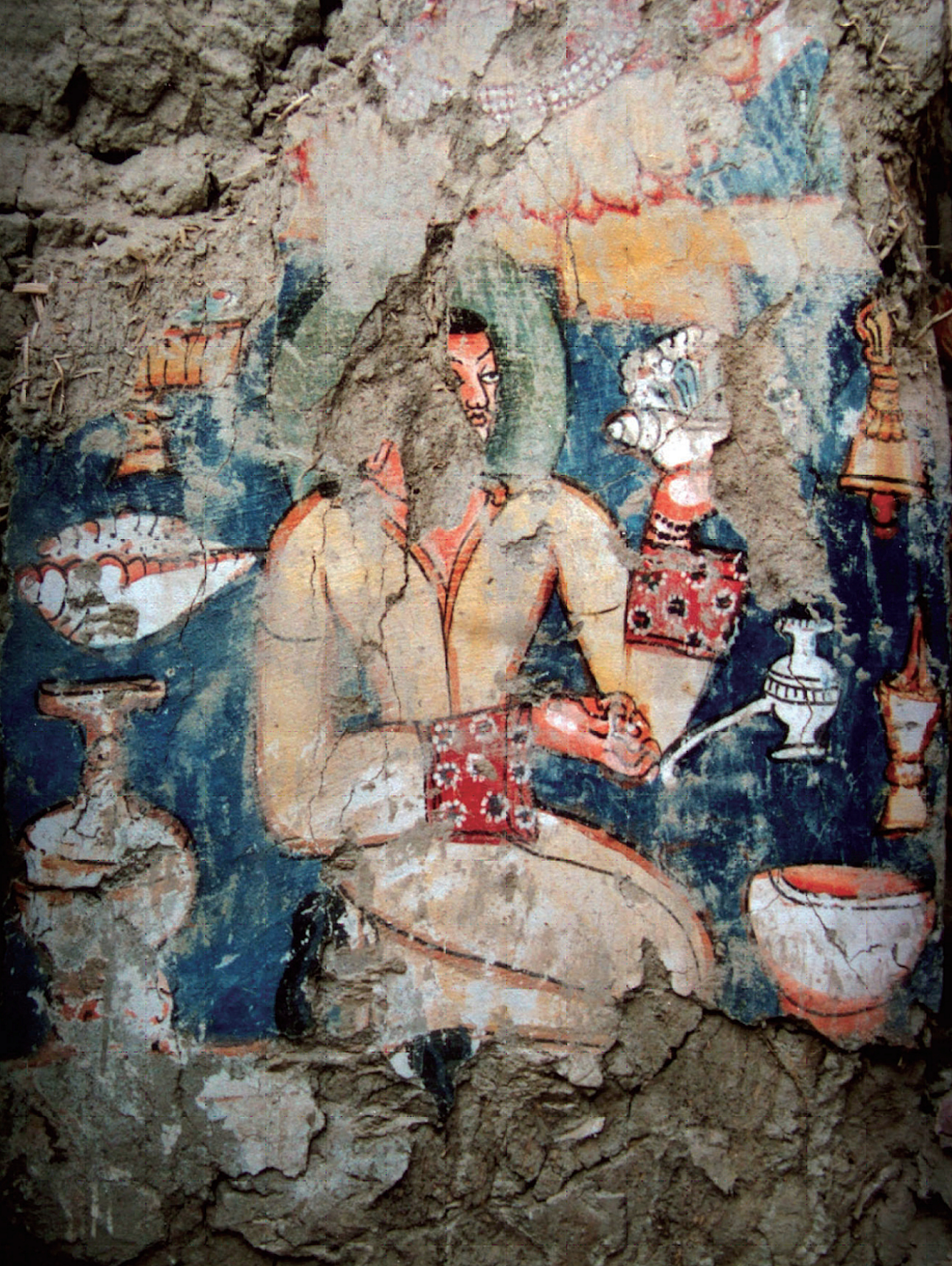
Donor depiction, presumably king Lha lde of Guge. Northwest stupa, Tholing Monastery, ca. 1025 CE.

In 1037, Khor re's eldest grandson 'Od lde was killed in a conflict with the Kara-Khanid Khanate from Central Asia, who subsequently ravaged Ngari. His brother Byang chub 'Od (984–1078), a Buddhist monk, took power as secular ruler. He was responsible for inviting Atiśa to Tibet in 1040 and thus ushering in the so-called Chidar (Phyi-dar) phase of Buddhism in Tibet. Byang chub 'Od's son rTse lde was murdered by his nephew in 1088. This event marked the break-up of the Guge-Purang kingdom, since one of his brothers was established as separate king of Purang. The usurping nephew dBang lde continued the royal dynasty in Guge.

A new Kara-Khanid invasion of Guge took place before 1137 and cost the life of the ruler, bKra shis rtse. Later in the same century the kingdom was temporarily divided. In 1240 the Mongol khagan, at least nominally, gave authority over the Ngari area to the Drigung Monastery in Ü-Tsang.

Grags pa lde was an important ruler who united the Guge area around 1265 and subjugated the related Ya rtse (Khasa) kingdom. After his death in 1277 Guge was dominated by the Sakya monastic regime. After 1363, with the decline of the Mongol-led Yuan dynasty and their Sakya protégés, Guge was again strengthened and took over Purang in 1378. Purang was henceforth contested between Guge and Mustang, but was finally integrated into the former. Guge also briefly ruled over Ladakh in the late 14th century. From 1499 the Guge king had to acknowledge the Rinpungpa rulers of Tsang. The 15th and 16th centuries were marked by a considerable Buddhist building activity by the kings, who frequently showed their devotion to the Gelug leaders later known as the Dalai Lamas.

=== Ladakhi invasions ===
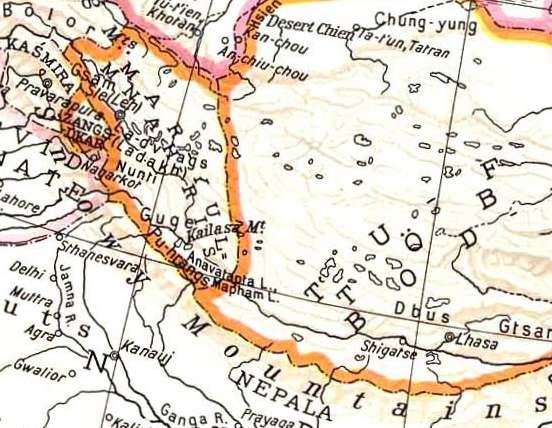
Guge in Maryul during 11th century

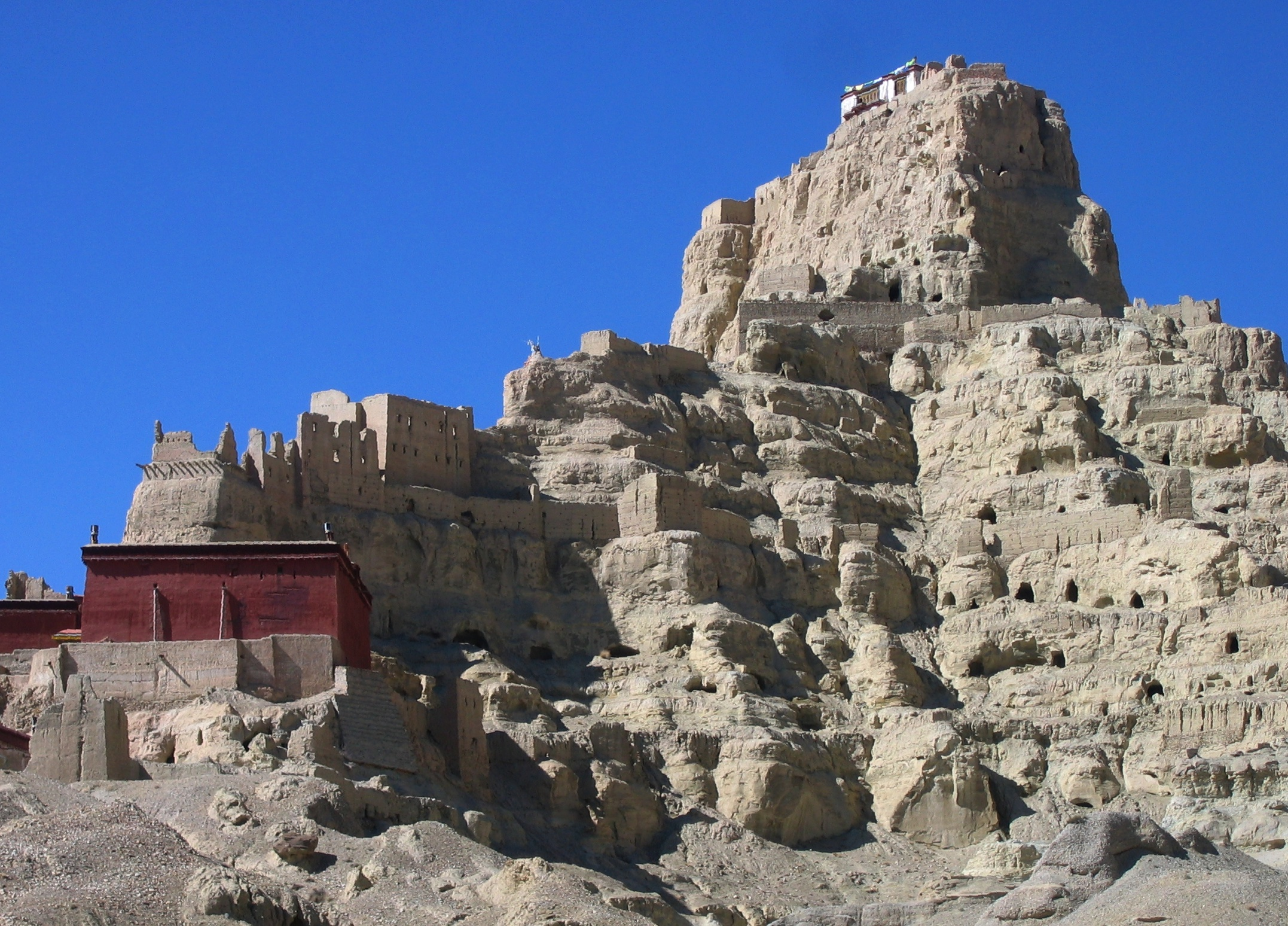
Tsaparang, the ruins of the ancient capital of Guge

The first Westerners to reach Guge were António de Andrade, a Jesuit missionary, and his companion brother Manuel Marques, in 1624. De Andrade reported seeing irrigation canals and rich crops in what is now a dry and desolate land. Perhaps as evidence of the kingdom's openness, de Andrade's party was allowed to construct a chapel in Tsaparang and instruct the people about Catholic Christianity. A letter by De Andrade relates that some military commanders revolted and called the Ladakhis to overthrow the ruler. There had been friction between Guge and Ladakh for many years, and the invitation was heeded in 1630. The Ladakhi forces laid siege to the almost impenetrable Tsaparang. The King's brother, who was chief lama and thus a staunch Buddhist, advised the pro-Christian ruler to surrender against keeping the state as tributary ruler. This treacherous advice was eventually accepted. Tibetan sources suggest that the Guge population was maintained in their old status. The last king, Tashi Drakpa De, (Khri bKra shis Grags pa lde) and his brother and other kin, were deported to Ladakh, where they lived comfortably until their death. The prince married a wife from the Ladakhi royal family.

=== Annexation to Central Tibet ===
Tsaparang and the Guge kingdom were later conquered in 1679–80 by the Lhasa-based Central Tibetan government under the leadership of the 5th Dalai Lama, driving out the Ladakhis.

== Historiography ==
Western archeologists heard about Guge again in the 1930s through the work of Italian Giuseppe Tucci. Tucci's work was mainly about the frescoes of Guge. Lama Anagarika Govinda and Li Gotami Govinda visited the kingdom of Guge, including Tholing and Tsaparang, in 1947–1949. Their tours of central and western Tibet are recorded in black-and-white photos.

== Rulers ==
A list of rulers of Guge and the related Ya rtse kingdom has been established by the Tibetologists Luciano Petech and Roberto Vitali

A. Royal ancestors of the Yarlung dynasty

- 'Od srungs (in Central Tibet 842–905) son of Glang Darma
- dPal 'Khor btsan (in Central Tibet 905–910) son
- Kyide Nyimagon (in Ngari Korsum, c. 912–?) son
- Palgyigon (received Ladakh, 10th century) son
- Detsukgon (received Zanskar, 10th century) brother

B. Kings of Guge and Purang.

- Trashigon (received Guge and Purang, fl. 947) brother
- Yeshe-Ö (?–988 or 959–1036) son
- Nagaraja (religious leader, d. 1023) son
- Devaraja (religious leader, d. 1026) brother
- Khor re (988–996) uncle
- Lha lde (996–1024) son
- 'Od lde btsan (1024–1037) son
- Byang chub 'Od (1037–1057) brother
- Zhi ba 'Od (religious leader, d. 1111) brother
- Che chen tsha rTse lde (1057–1088) son of Byang chub 'od

C. Kings of Ya rtse.

- Naga lde (early 12th century)
- bTsan phyug lde (mid-12th century)
- bKra shis lde (12th century)
- Grags btsan lde (12th century) brother of bTsan phyug lde)
- Grags pa lde (Kradhicalla) (fl. 1225)
- A sog lde (Ashokacalla) (fl. 1255–1278) son
- 'Ji dar sMal (Jitarimalla) (fl. 1287–1293) son
- A nan sMal (Anandamalla) (late 13th century) brother
- Ri'u sMal (Ripumalla) (fl. 1312–1214) son
- San gha sMal (Sangramamalla) (early 14th century) son
- Ajitamalla (1321–1328) son of Jitarimalla
- Kalyanamalla (14th century)
- Pratapamalla (14th century)
- Pu ni sMal (Punyamalla) (fl. 1336–1339) of Purang royalty
- sPri ti sMal (Prthivimalla) (fl. 1354–1358) son

D. Kings of Guge.

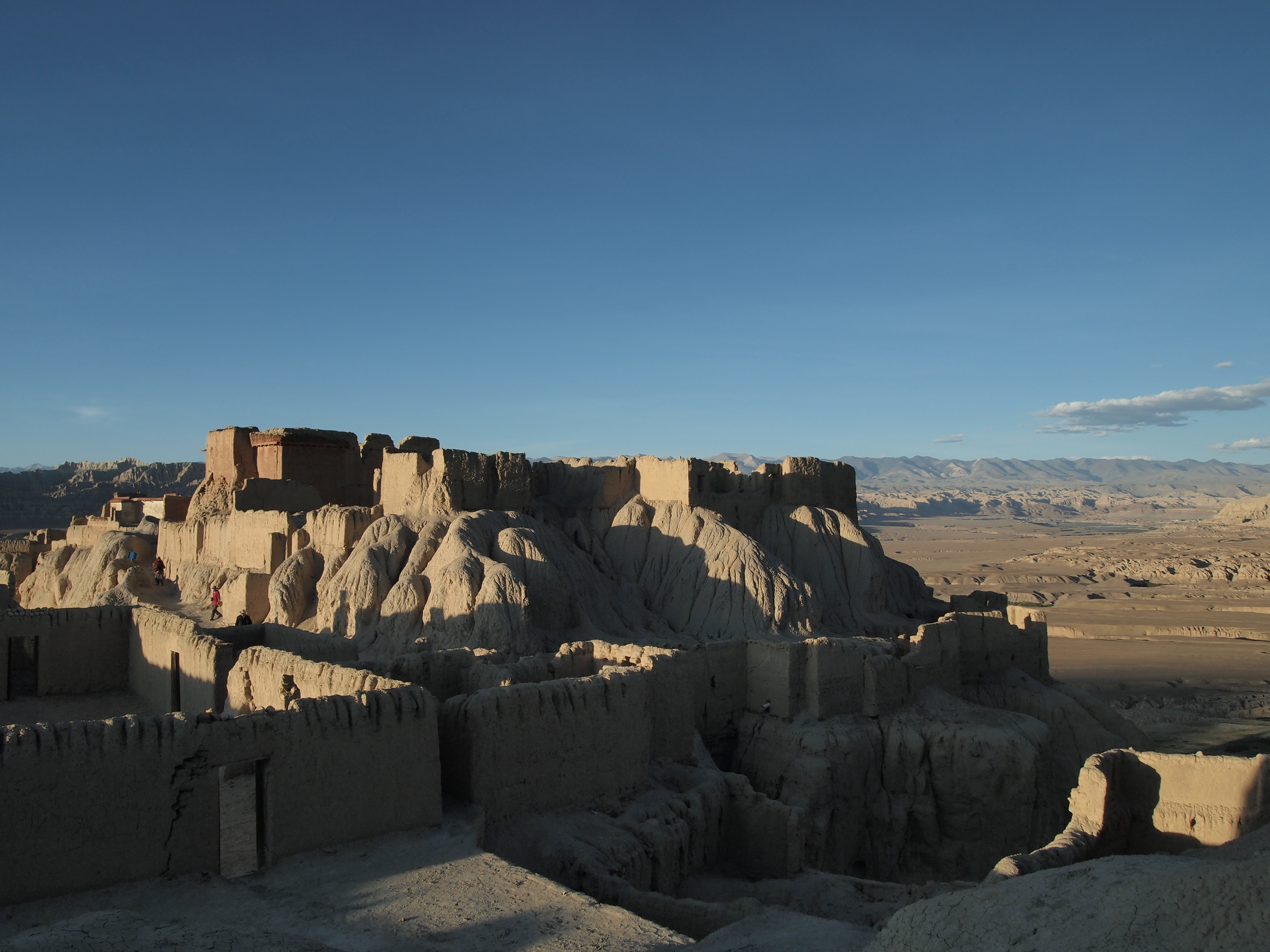
Ruins of Tsaparang.

- Bar lde (dBang lde) (1088 – c. 1095) nephew of Che chen tsha rTse lde
- bSod nams rtse (c. 1095 – early 12th century) son
- bKra shis rtse (before 1137) son
- Jo bo rGyal po (regent, mid-12th century) brother
- rTse 'bar btsan (12th century) son of bKra shis rtse
- sPyi lde btsan (12th century) son
- rNam lde btsan (12th/13th century) son
- Nyi ma lde (12th/13th century) son
- dGe 'bum (13th century) probably an outsider
- La ga (died c. 1260) of foreign origin
- Chos rgyal Grags pa (c. 1260–1265)
- Grags pa lde (c. 1265–1277) prince from Lho stod
- unknown rulers
- rNam rgyal lde (c. 1396 – 1424) son of a Guge ruler
- Nam mkha'i dBang po Phun tshogs lde (1424–1449) son
- rNam ri Sang rgyas lde (1449–?) son
- bLo bzang Rab brtan (died c. 1485) son
- sTod tsha 'Phags pa lha (c. 1485 – after 1499) son
- Shakya 'od (early 16th century) son
- Jig rten dBang phyug Pad kar lde (fl. 1537–1555) son?
- Ngag gi dBang phyug (16th century) son
- Nam mkha dBang phyug (16th century) son
- Khri Nyi ma dBang phyug (late 16th century) son
- Khri Grags pa'i dBang phyug (c. 1600) son
- Khri Nam rgyal Grags pa lde (fl. 1618) son
- Tashi Drakpa De (before 1622–1630) son
- Kingdom conquered by Ladakh (1630)
- Kingdom later conquered by Tibet under the Fifth Dalai Lama (1679–1680)

== See also ==
- Purang-Guge Kingdom
- Zhangzhung
- Tsaparang
- History of Tibet
- Ladakh Chronicles
- List of rulers of Tibet
