= Dipankar =

- Pronunciation: Dip+Ankar
- Gender: Male
- Language: Assamese, Bengali

Origin
- Meaning: One who has lamp in his hands
- Region of origin: Kolkata and punjab

Dipankar is a given name in Assam and West Bengal. It means "One who has the lamp in his hands or part of deep means light". People having this name are generally considered to be male.

== Notable people with this name ==
- Dipankar Srijnan Atisha (982–1054), Buddhist religious leader and master
- Deepankar De, Indian actor
- Dipankar Banerjee (general), Indian major general
- Dipankar Banerjee (metallurgist) (born 1952), Indian metallurgist and engineer
- Dipankar Bhattacharjee (born 1972), Indian badminton player
- Dipankar Das Sarma (born 1955), Indian scientist and chemist
- Dipankar Datta (born 1965), Indian judge
- Dipankar Gupta (born 1949), Indian sociologist
- Dipankar Home (born 1955), Indian theoretical physicist
- Swami Dipankar (spiritual leader)
