= Yeshe-Ö =

Tibetan lama-king (c. 959–1040)

Lhachen Yeshe-Ö
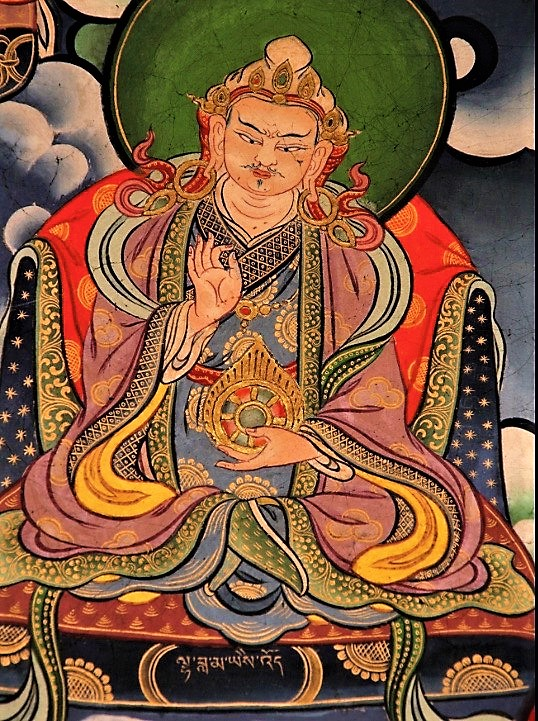

King of Guge
- Reign: 967–975
- Predecessor: Trashigon
- Successor: Khor-re
- Born: c. 959
- Died: c. 1040
- Issue: Nagaraja; Devaraja
- Father: Trashigon

Yeshe-Ö (c. 959–1040; Tibetan: ཡེ་ཤེས་འོད་, Wylie: ye shes 'od; spiritual names Lha bLama Yeshes 'Od, Byang Chub Ye Shes 'Od, Lha Bla Ma, Lalama Yixiwo, also Dharmaraja – 'Noble King') was the first notable lama-king in Tibet. Born as Khor-re, he is better known as Lhachen Yeshe-Ö, his spiritual name.

Yeshe-Ö was the second king in the succession of the kingdom of Guge in the southwestern Tibetan Plateau. Yeshe-Ö abdicated the throne in c. 975 to become a lama. In classical Tibetan historiography, the restoration of an organized and monastic tradition of Tibetan Buddhism is attributed to him. He built Tholing Monastery in 997 when Tholing was the capital of Guge. Yeshe-Ö' sponsored novitiates, including the great translator Rinchen Zangpo.

== Early life and rule ==
From a young age, Yeshe-Ö was interested in religious matters. He was the son of king Tashi-gon (bKra-shis-mgon), and ruled the merged kingdoms of Tashigon and Detsugon, covering the regions of Purang and Guge and Zanskar, Spiti and Lahaul and Upper Kinnaur. He ruled over the combined Purang-Guge Kingdom from 967.

Yeshe-Ö', better known by his spiritual name, Lhachen Yeshe-Ö, was the first notable lama-king in Tibet. His first act as king was to issue commands decreed under the title bka’ shog chen mo ('Great Dictums'), which reflected his primary aim of ruling his kingdom theocratically: it was the reason that he came to be known as 'a king and monk'. This orientation was to ensure propagation of Buddhism throughout Tibet. He commanded farmers and nomads to pay an endowment fee towards the maintenance of the monastery.

The 'second diffusion of Buddhism' in Tibet is solely attributed to Yeshe-Ö. He believed in reforming his kingdom under the ethos of three "R"s namely, religious education, religious architecture, and religious reform, during a time when the Indian Buddhist religious, artistic, architectural, scriptural and philosophical traditions permeated all the Tibetan world through Guge. Based on the practices followed in Kashmir and India, Yeshe-Ö deputed twenty-one specially chosen young novitiates to be trained as monks in Kashmir and other Buddhist learning centres. They were to study under Buddhist Gurus in renowned institutions, and to translate Buddhist scriptures from the Sanskrit to Tibetan. Of the novitiates, only two survived, Rinchen Zangpo and Lekpai Sherap. The others succumbed to the extreme weather conditions of northern India.

Rinchen Zangpo was such an impressive student that Yeshe-Ö made him responsible for the translation of other Sanskrit scriptures, as well as the building of monasteries in Tibet. The first one in western Tibet, Tholing, was built in 997, after Yeshe-Ö had been king for thirty years. The other main monasteries built under the king's initiative were Tabo Monastery in Ladakh, and the Khochar monastery.

He ruled, along with his brother, the entire Western Himalayan region. He founded temples and encouraged the nobility of Tibet. He opposed the esoteric forms of tantric practices (mostly by non-organised groups) which were prevalent in Tibet, and felt revulsion about the introduction of Tantrism into Tibet's new culture of Buddhism. His wish was to maintain a purer and more rationalistic form of religion in Tibet, and his views were quoted in the Blue Annals, written in the fifteenth century.

The large number of bronze works of art made of are credited to Nagaraja, one of his two sons.

== Legacy ==
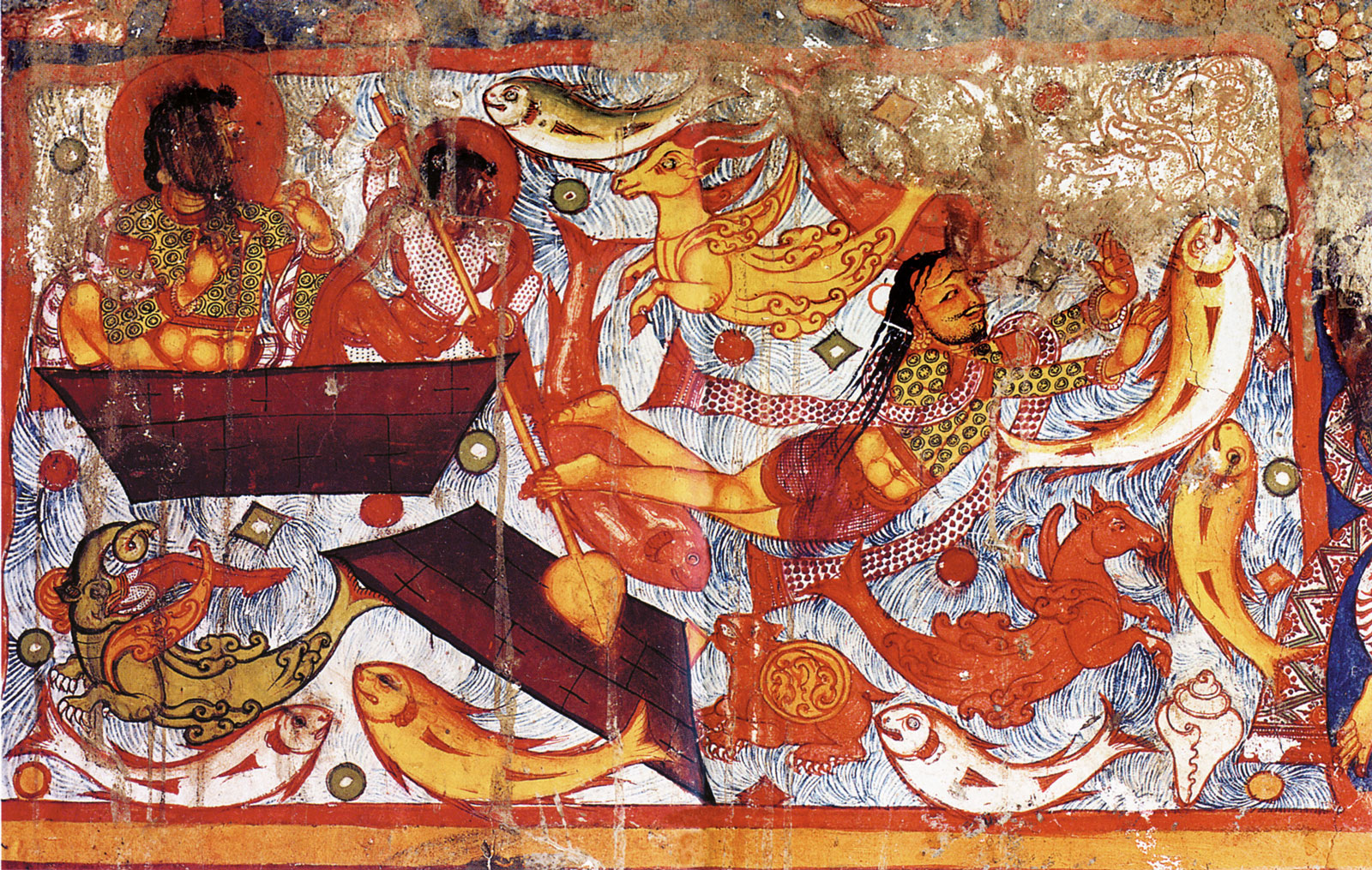
Avalokiteshvara painting of a fisherman in distress during a storm, in the northeast stupa of the Temple of Yeshe Ö, Tholing, (Kashmiri origin, c. 11th century)

The tenth century Yeshe-Ö temple is currently under reconstruction after the Red Guards damaged it during the Cultural Revolution in 1967. In the Lotsava Lakhang in Riba, in Ngari Prefecture, field research revealed a painting of eight monks, including Rinchen Zangpo, sent to Kashmir by Yeshe-Ö to bring texts of scriptures of Mahayana Buddhism from there to western Tibet.

== Bibliography ==
- Forte, Erika (2011). "Symposium Report" (PDF). Orientations. Quarry Bay, Hong Kong: Orientations Magazine Ltd.
- Gibbons, Peter; Pritchard-Jones, Siân (2010). The Mount Kailash Trek: Tibet's Sacred Mountain and Western Tibet. Milnthorpe: Cicerone Press Limited. ISBN 978-1-85284-514-8.
- Hāṇḍā, Om Chanda (2001). Buddhist Western Himalaya: A Politico-Religious History. New Delhi: Indus Publishing. ISBN 978-81-7387-124-5.
- Hāṇḍā, Om Chanda (2004). Buddhist Monasteries of Himachal. New Delhi: Indus Publishing. ISBN 978-81-7387-170-2.
- Lê Huu, Phước (2010). Buddhist Architecture. Grafikol. ISBN 978-0-9844043-0-8. OCLC 639315496.
- Powers, John; Templeman, David (2012). Historical Dictionary of Tibet. Lanham, MD: Scarecrow Press. ISBN 978-0-8108-7984-3. OCLC 807353050.
- Thakur, Laxman S. (November 1994). "A Tibetan Inscription by lHa Bla-ma Ye-shes-'od from dKor (sPu) Rediscovered". Journal of the Royal Asiatic Society. Third Series, Vol. 4 (3). Cambridge University Press: 369–375. doi:10.1017/S1356186300005988. JSTOR 25182940. S2CID 161412272. (registration required)
