= Zanda County =

Zanda County 札达县 • རྩ་མདའ་རྫོང་། Tsamda
- County
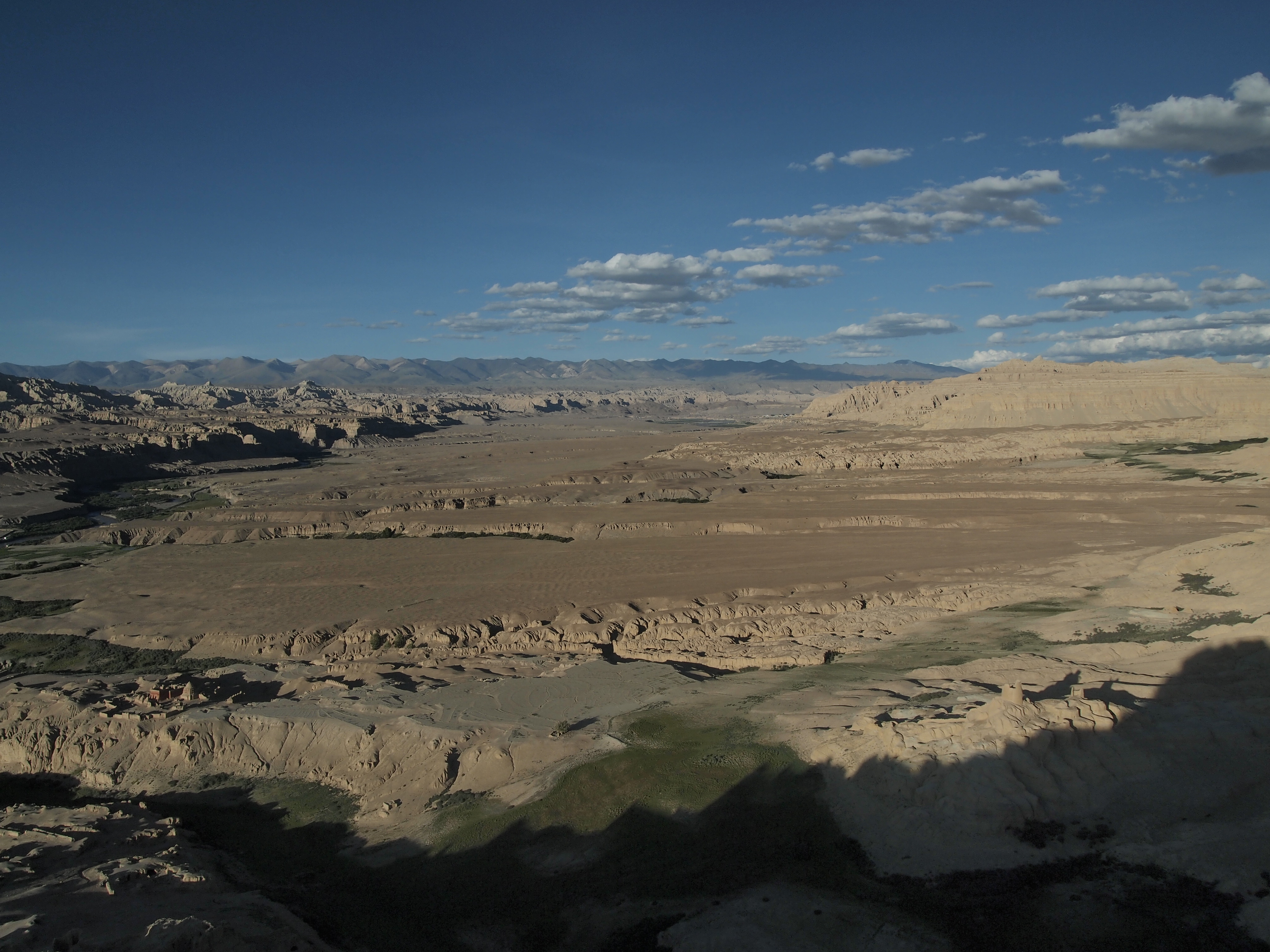
- Landscape of Zanda, viewed from Tsaparang.

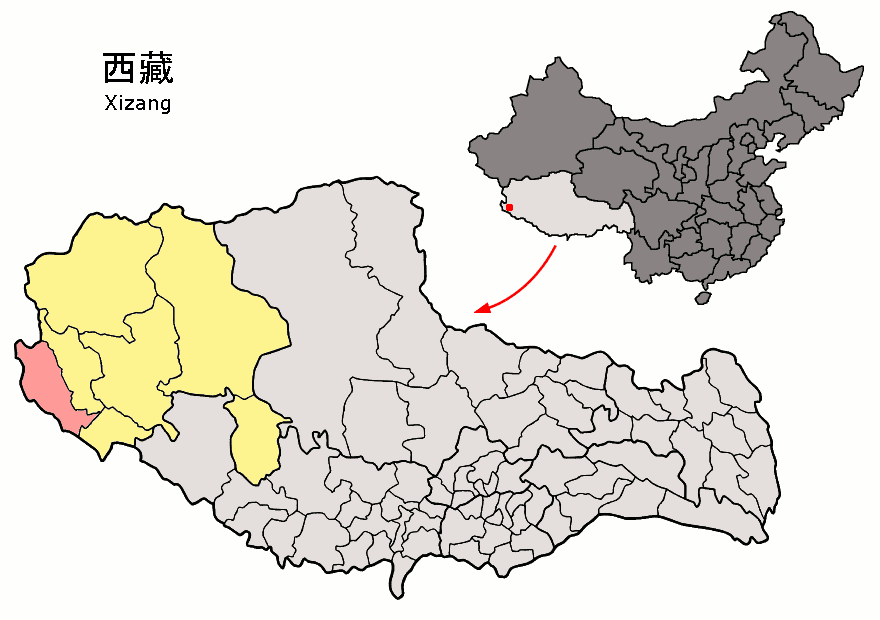
- Location of Zanda County within Tibet Autonomous Region

- Location of the seat in the Tibet AR Zanda (Tibet) Zanda (China)
- Coordinates (Zanda County government): 31.481°N 79.802°E
- Country: China
- Autonomous region: Tibet
- Prefecture: Ngari
- County seat: Tholing

Area
  - Total: 24,601.59 km^{2} (9,498.73 sq mi)

Population (2020)
  - Total: 8,454
  - Density: 0.3436/km^{2} (0.8900/sq mi)
- Time zone: UTC+8 (China Standard)
- Website: zd.al.gov.cn

Zanda County

Chinese name
- Simplified Chinese: 札达县
- Traditional Chinese: 札達縣
Transcriptions
Standard Mandarin
- Hanyu Pinyin: Zhádá Xiàn

Tibetan name
- Tibetan: རྩ་མདའ་རྫོང་།
Transcriptions
- Wylie: rtsa mda' rdzong
- THL: tsa da dzong
- Tibetan Pinyin: Zanda Zong

Zanda County or Tsamda County (Tibetan: རྩ་མདའ་རྫོང, Chinese: 札达县) is a county in the Ngari Prefecture to the extreme west of the Tibet Autonomous Region of China. Its seat of power is at Tholing, the former capital of the Guge kingdom. Zanda (Tsamda) was established in 1956 through a merger of Tsaparang and Daba counties.

Zanda County is bounded by India's Himachal Pradesh state to the west, Uttarakhand State to the south, Ladakh to the northwest, Gar County to the northeast and Burang County to the southeast. Ancient Zanda horse (Hipparion zandaense) skeletons have been found in Zanda County's Sutlej basin.

== Administrative divisions ==
Zanda county is divided into 1 town and 4 townships:

Name	Chinese	Hanyu Pinyin	Tibetan	Wylie
Town
Thoding Town (Tholing)	托林镇	Tuōlín zhèn	མཐོ་ལྡིང་གྲོང་རྡལ།	mtho lding grong rdal
Townships
Dzarong Township	萨让乡	Sàràng xiāng	རྫ་རོང་ཤང་།	rdza rong shang
Danbab Township (Daba)	达巴乡	Dábā xiāng	མདའ་འབབ་ཤང་།	mda' 'bab shang
Diyag Township	底雅乡	Dǐyǎ xiāng	ཏི་ཡག་ཤང་།	ti yag shang
Qangzê Township	香孜乡	Xiāngzī xiāng	བྱང་རྩེ་ཤང་།	byang rtse shang
Qusum Township	曲松乡	Qǔsōng xiāng	ཆུ་གསུམ་ཤང་།	chu gsum shang
Tsosib Sumkyil Township (Churup Sumkhel)	楚鲁松杰乡	Chǔlǔsōngjié xiāng	ཚོ་སྲིབ་གསུམ་དཀྱིལ་ཤང་།	tshe srib gsum dkyil shang

== See also ==
- Tsaparang
- Chepzi
