= Tsaparang =

Abandoned settlement in Tibet

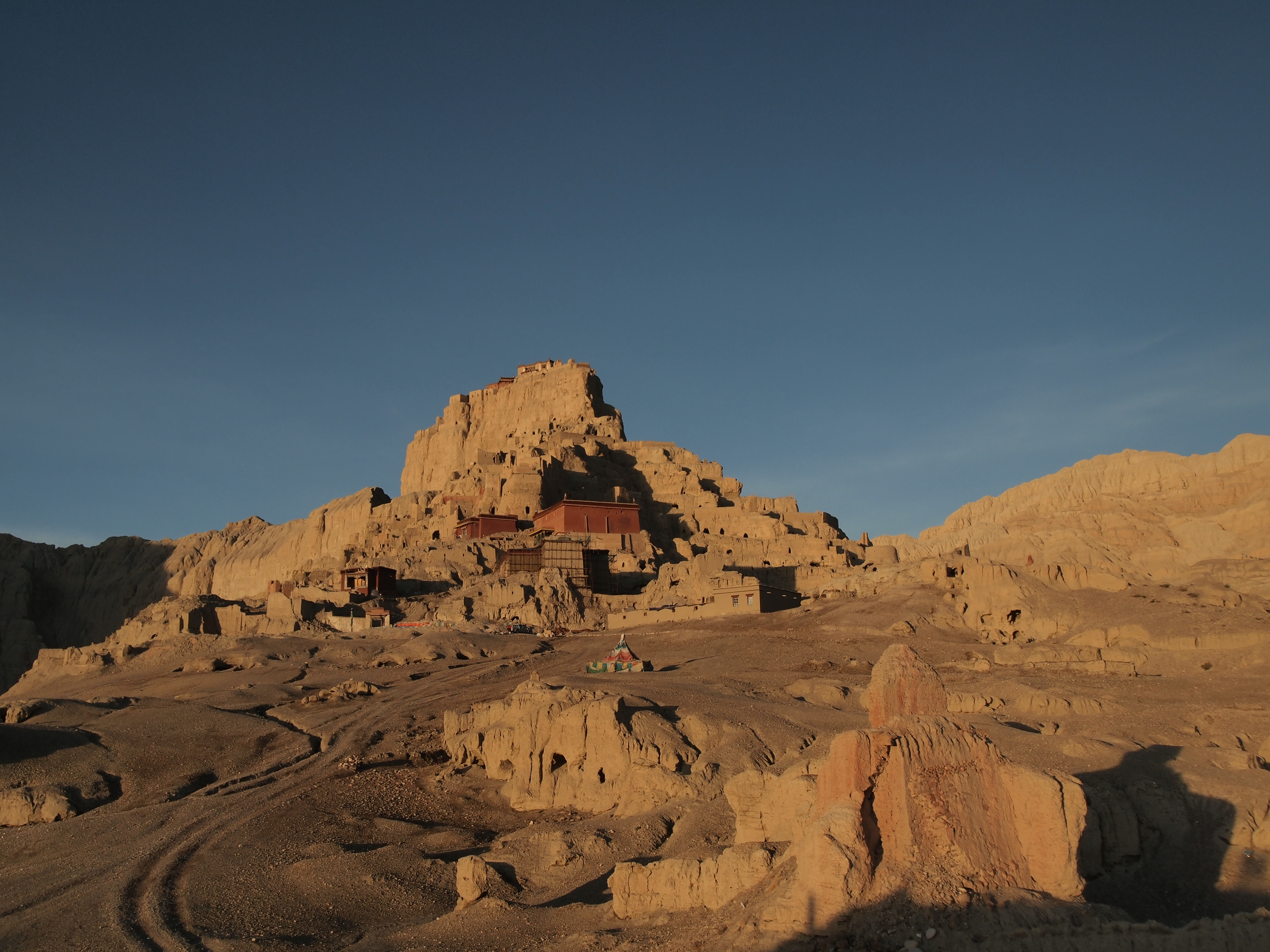
- The ruins of Tsaparang

- Location within Tibet Autonomous Region#Location within Ngari Prefecture Tsaparang (Ngari)
- 31°27′59″N 79°40′14″E
- Location: Zanda, Ngari, Tibet Autonomous Region, China
- Region: Tibet

History
- Built: 9th or 10th century CE
- Abandoned: 1680 CE

Site notes
- Elevation: 3,800 m (12,500 ft)

Tsaparang (Tibetan: རྩ་བྲང, Wylie: rtsa-brang) was the capital of the ancient kingdom of Guge in the Garuda Valley, through which the upper Sutlej River flows, in Ngari Prefecture (Western Tibet) near the border of Ladakh. It is 278 km south-southwest of Senggezangbo Town and 26 km west of the 11th-century monastery at Tholing, and not far west of Mount Kailash and Lake Manasarovar. The Tsaparang Dzong was located here. Nearby is the Bon monastery of Gurugem.

Tsaparang is a huge fortress perched on a pyramid-shaped rock rising about 500 to 600 feet (152 to 183 m) at the end of a long narrow spur. It contains numerous tunnels and caves that have been carved out of the rock. At its base was a village where the common people lived. Above them were two public temples - the Lhakhang Marpo (Red Chapel) and the Lhakhang Karpo (White Chapel), and quarters for the monks. Up, a twisting stone staircase in a tunnel were the royal quarters, and at the very top, the summer palace.

The English TV presenter and historian Michael Wood, in the "Shangri-La" episode of the BBC TV/PBS documentary series In Search of Myths and Heroes, suggested that Tsaparang was the historical origin of the legend of Shangri-La, and that its two great temples were once home to the kings of Guge in modern Tibet.

== History ==
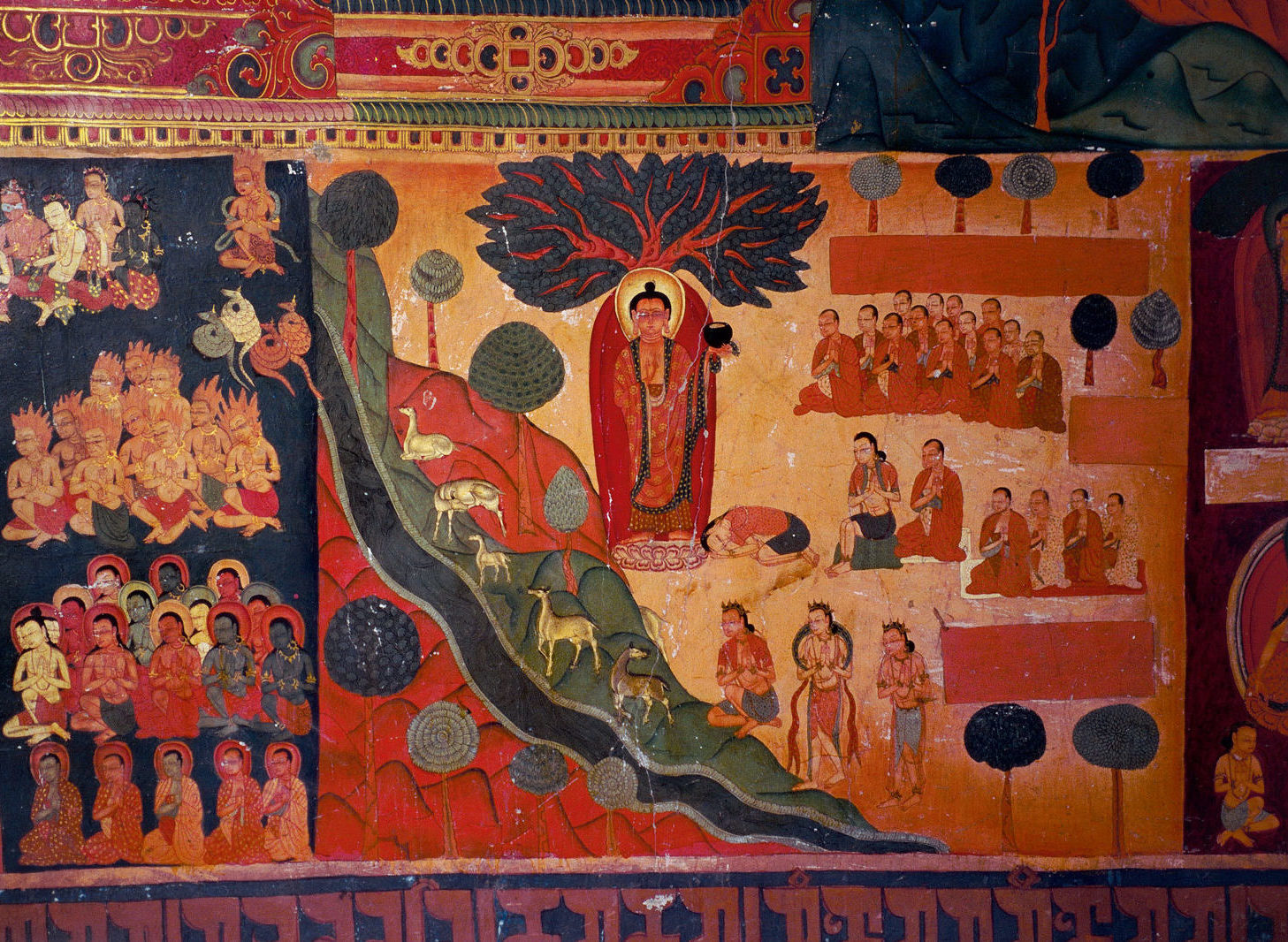
Painting showing the story of the Conversion of the Householder Yasa, who became a mendicant and was established as an Arhat, in the Red Temple in Tsparang, fifteenth century.

According to some accounts, Tsaparang was made the capital of the Kingdom of Guge by Namde Wosung, one of the sons of the Langdarma the anti-Buddhist king of Tibet 838-841 CE, after Langdarma was assassinated. The Tibetan Empire was then plunged into civil war and split into a number of independent kingdoms. Other accounts say that two of Langdarma's grandsons fled to Western Tibet about 919 CE. The eldest one, Kyide Nyiamagon, established himself at Purang and conquered a large area including Ladakh and parts of Spiti. After his death his kingdom was split up between his three sons into the kingdoms of Guge, Purang, and Maryul (= Ladakh).

Guge controlled an ancient trading route between India and Tibet. It emerged in the region previously known as Zhangzhung and became an important regional power by the 10th century CE.

"In the 11th century, King Yeshe-Ö, working with the famous Sanskrit translator, Rinchen Zangpo ('The Great Translator"), and the Indian master Atiśa, reintroduced Buddhism to western Tibet. Soon Tsaparang, and Tholing, also made of mud brick, were built, along with other temples and monasteries. The influence of the Guge Kingdom, particularly the monastic center of Tholing, was felt from Kashmir to Assam."

In the summer of 1624 two Portuguese Jesuit missionaries, Fr. António de Andrade and Brother Manuel Marques, came to the region looking for Christian kingdoms that had long been rumored to lay beyond the Himalayas. After a harrowing journey (they were the first known Europeans to traverse the Himalayas) they arrived in Tsaparang, where they managed to gain permission from the king of Guge to freely preach their religion throughout the kingdom, and left after less than a month. After gaining formal permission and funds to start a mission in Tibet from the Jesuit superior at Goa, Andrade, Marques, and three other Jesuits journeyed to Tsaparang the following summer and built a church at the foot of the citadel and another one at Rudok 130 miles (209 km) away. António de Andrade left Tibet in 1628, and in 1630 the king of Ladakh, Senge Namgyal, invaded and overthrew the kingdom of Guge, taking the pro-Jesuit king (Tri Tashi Drakpa) and his family captive. Under Ladakhi rule the mission quickly fell into disarray; Andrade was assassinated in Goa in 1634. In 1640 Manuel Marques led an expedition back in an attempt to reestablish the mission but he was captured and the rest of his party fled. He wrote a pitiful letter to the Jesuit headquarters at Agra in India begging to be rescued, but was never heard from again.

In 1679–80 Tsaparang and the Guge kingdom were conquered by Central Tibet, based in Lhasa under the 5th Dalai Lama. In spite of massive damage done then, and the destruction of most of the statues and murals in both chapels by the Red Guards during the Cultural Revolution, many magnificent frescoes have somehow survived.

== See also ==
- Catholic Church in Tibet
