= Tholing =

Tholing མཐོ་ལིང་གྲོང་བརྡལ 托林镇 Zanda
- Town
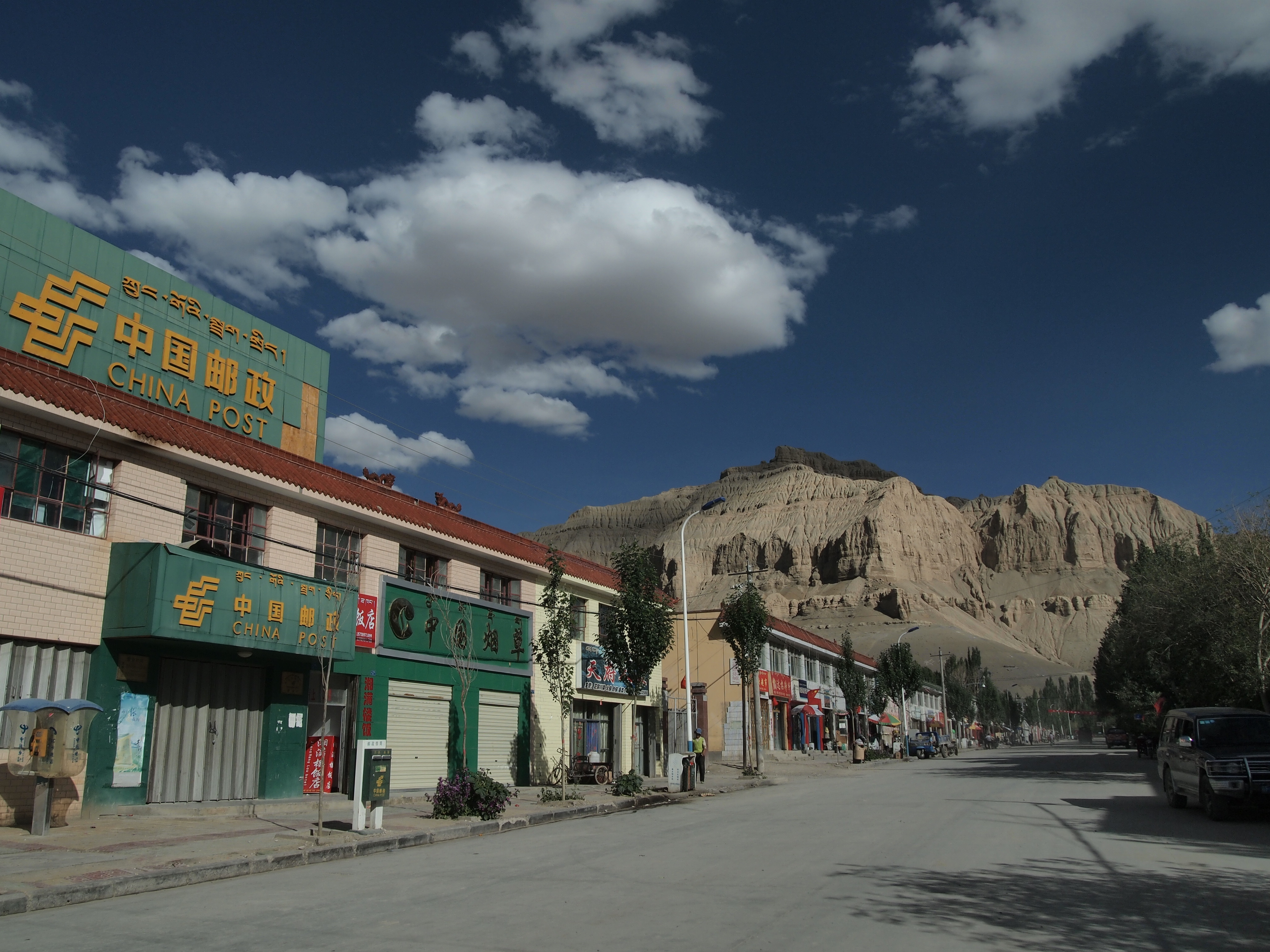

- Location in Tibet Autonomous Region
- Coordinates: 31°29′03″N 79°48′02″E
- Country: China
- Region: Tibet Autonomous Region
- Prefecture: Ngari
- County: Zanda

Area
  - Total: 0.3 km^{2} (0.12 sq mi)
- Elevation: 3,723 m (12,215 ft)

Population
  - Total: 600
  - Density: 2,000/km^{2} (5,200/sq mi)
  - Major Nationalities: Tibetan
  - Regional dialect: Tibetan language
- Time zone: UTC+8 (China Standard)
- Postal code: 859600
- Area code: 0897

Tholing (Tibetan: མཐོ་ལྡིང་, Wylie: mtho lding, literally "high place";Chinese: 托林; pinyin: Tuōlín), (Note: Alternative spellings: Toling, Tuolin, and Toding.) also called Zanda (Tibetan: རྩ་མདའ, Wylie: rtsa mda, THL: tsa da), (Note: Alternative spellings: Tsanda, Tsamda, Tsada, and Zada.) is a town and the seat of Zanda County, Ngari Prefecture, in the west of Tibet Autonomous Region, People's Republic of China. The town was the former capital of Guge Kingdom in western Tibet. Now it is an isolated military town. It has a well laid out new street, a post office, and telecommunication facilities. The Tholing Monastery, established in 997 AD, is in the suburbs of the town, in the Grand canyon of the Langchen Tsangpo. Historically, it was an important monastery; the second dissemination of Buddhism in Tibet emanated from it.

== History ==
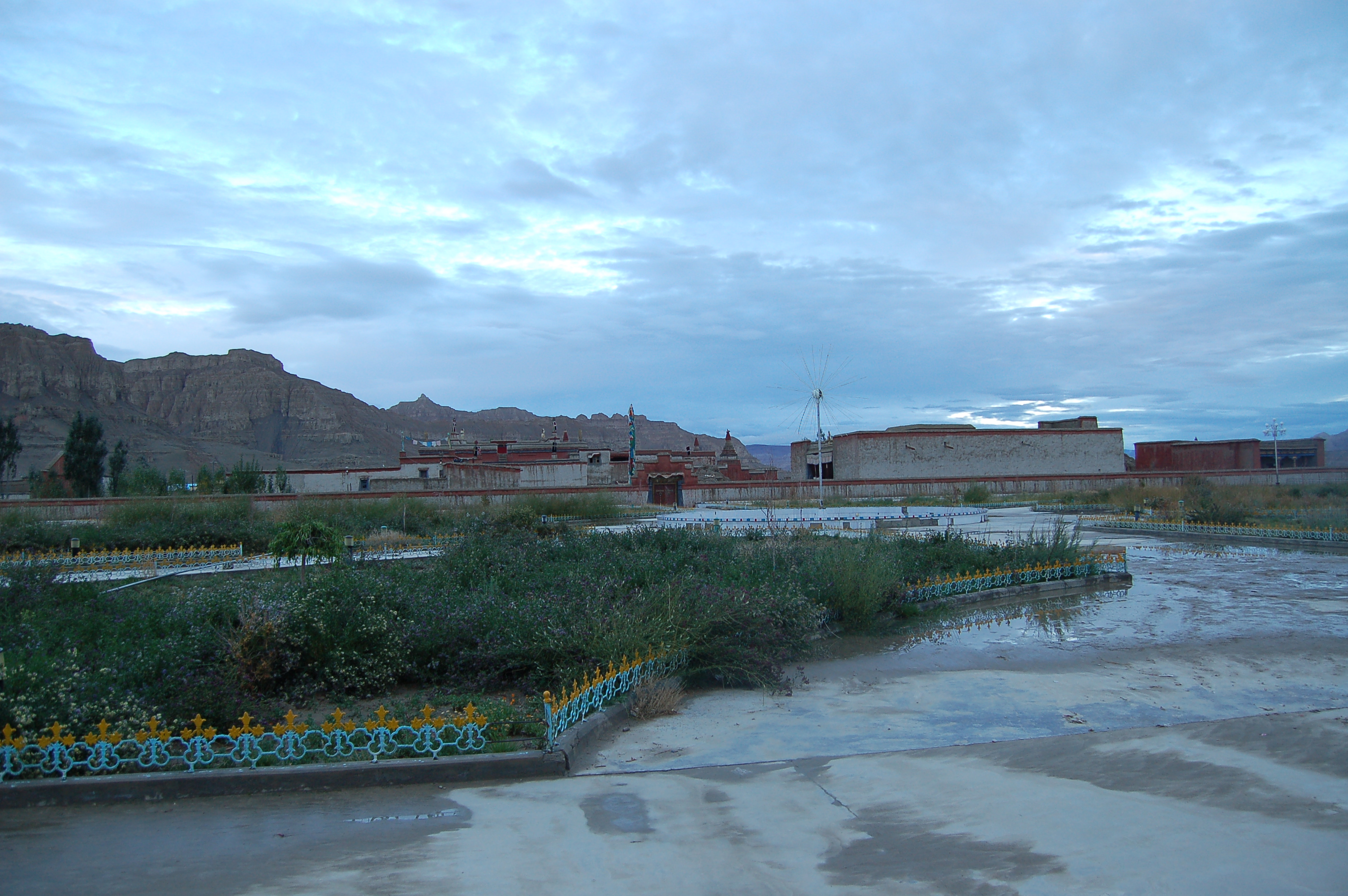
Tholing Monastery

Tholing was once the capital of the Ngari district in western Tibet. The town, the monastery, and Tsaparang, a rocky range with forts, played an important role the history of Tibetan Buddhism in west Tibet. Tholing and Tsaparang were the capital cities of the Parang-Guge Kingdom during the 10-11th centuries when Tibetan Buddhism civilization developed. Tholing was on an important trade route between India and Tibet. The Guge Kingdom fell into ruins by the end of 17th century, after the Ladakh army seized this kingdom in 1630.

== Geography ==
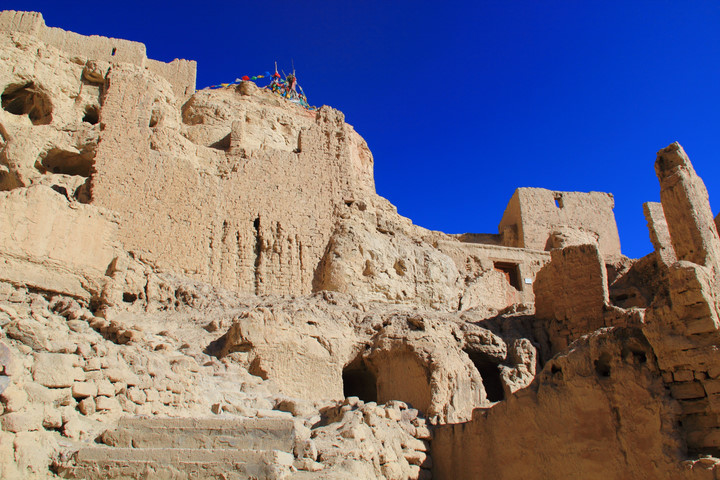
Ruins of Guge Kingdom

Recent maps only use the Zanda name, and not Tholing. Zanda sits at an elevation of 3,660 metres (12,010 ft). There are caves in the hills, and a few ruins of chortens located closer to the Sutlej River; the ruins are mostly destroyed but the murals are in very good condition. There are a few poplar trees in the town. A large army establishment is at the southern end of town whereas the Tibetan village is at the northern end of the town. There are a few guest houses between these two locations. The road to Zanda passes through very high snow-covered mountain ranges (in the elevation range of 5,200–5,500 metres (17,100–18,000 ft) along steep slopes and in the descent it passes through the canyon, crosses the Sutlej River at a bridge, and passes through a dry river bed before reaching Zanda.

== Notable buildings ==
Tholing's monastery ruins are within the town limits, while Tsparang's ruins, Gurugem monastery, are 20 kilometres (12 mi) away. Visits to Tholing monastery and the ruins of Tsaparang are only authorized by permit; it is issued by the Cultural Relics Bureau located at Lhasa. A 2011 report, on the "Art and History of the Cultural History of Western Tibet, 8th to 15th century, and Cultural Preservation", states that the Inner Asian Art Style has been identified in the paintings discovered from the cave temples in Zanda of Ngari. Much of the art and architecture were destroyed during the Cultural Revolution.

== Villages ==
The town of Tholing has jurisdiction over the following communities:

- Tuolin Residential Community (托林居委会)
- Bolin Village (波林村)
- Dongga Village (东嘎村)

== See also ==
- List of towns and villages in Tibet
