= Darchen =

Kangsa Village གངས་ས་གྲོང་ཚོ། དར་ཆེན 塔钦 Tarqên, Taqin, Lhara

Tibetan transcription(s)
  - Tibetan: གངས་ས་གྲོང་ཚོ།
  - ZYPY: Kangsa Chongco
  - Tibetan: དར་ཆེན
  - ZYPY: Tarqên

Chinese transcription(s)
  - Traditional: 塔欽
  - Simplified: 塔钦
  - Pinyin: tǎqīn
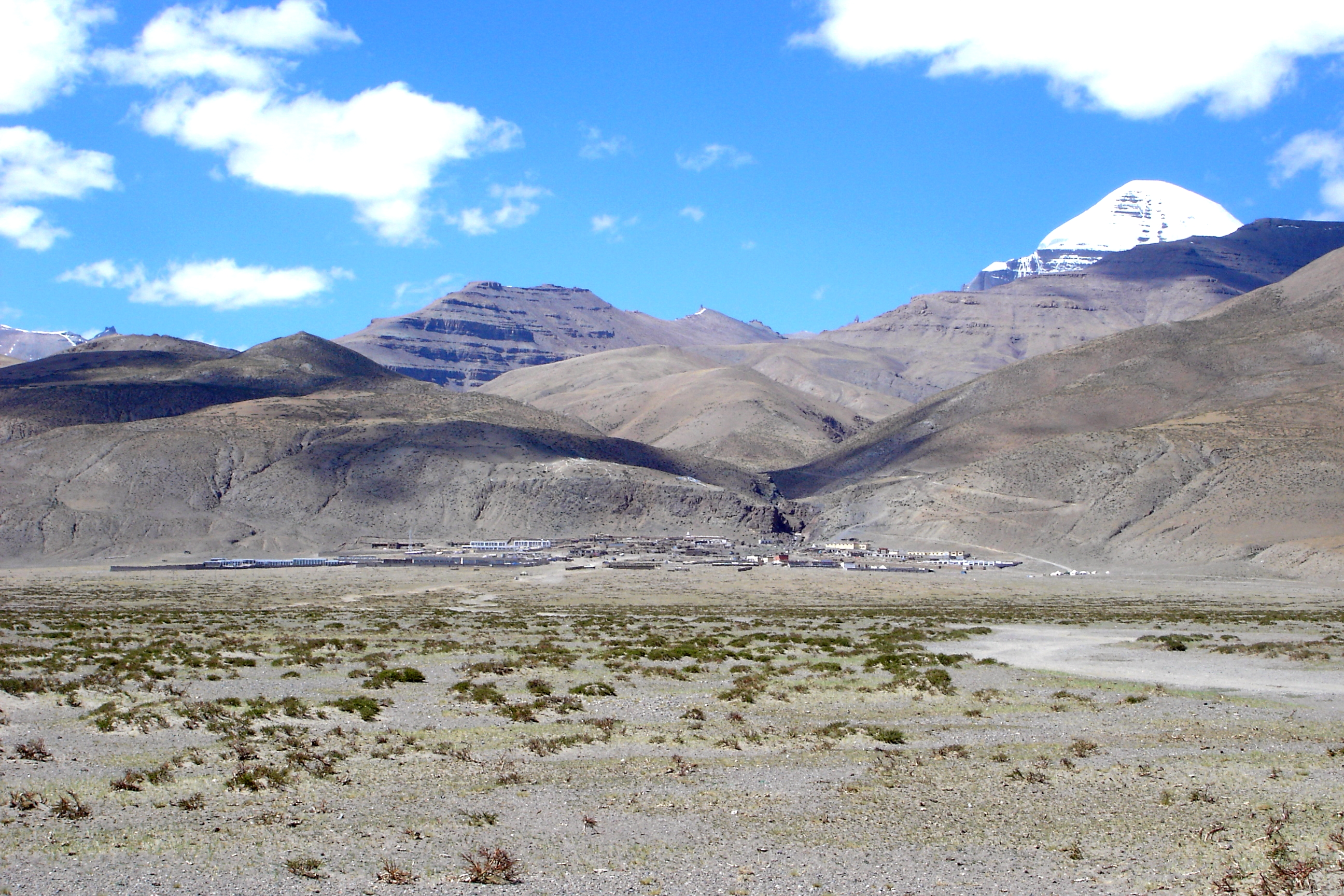
- Darchen
- Interactive map of Kangsa Village གངས་ས་གྲོང་ཚོ།
- Location within Tibet
- Coordinates: 30°58′35″N 81°17′13″E
- Country: China
- Region: Tibet
- Prefecture: Ngari Prefecture
- County: Burang County
- Elevation: 4,670 m (15,320 ft)

Population
  - Total
  - Major Nationalities: Tibetan
  - Regional dialect: Tibetan language
- Time zone: +8

Kangsa Village (Tibetan: གངས་ས་གྲོང་ཚོ།), poetically known as Darchen, Tarchan or Taqin (Tibetan: དར་ཆེན, ZWPY: Tarqên, simplified Chinese: 塔钦; traditional Chinese: 塔欽; pinyin: tǎqīn), is a former Bhutanese enclave, currently held by the People's Republic of China and the seat of the Parga Township, Purang County, Tibet Autonomous Region, China. Thus, it is commonly referred as Parga although there is another smaller settlement formally named Parga after which the Parga Township was named, located on the east of this settlement. It was also previously known as Lhara and still signposted as such. It was previously an important sheep station for nomads and their flocks and had only two permanent buildings; only one of which survived the Cultural Revolution and is now used to house Tibetan pilgrims.

Darchen is situated right in front of the sacred mountain, Mount Kailash. Its altitude is 4,670m (15,321 feet) and it is the starting and ending point for the parikrama/kora of Mount Kailash.

It is only a one-day bus drive (about 330 km) from the town of Shiquanhe or (Ali) to the northeast, where Gunsa Airport, opened 1 July 2010, is located, offering flights twice a week to Lhasa and Chengdu. A rough but motorable road extends from Darchen till a few kilometers beyond Diraphuk, below the Drolma La Pass on the Kailash pilgrimage route.

It contains a couple of restaurants and the Ganges guesthouse and restaurant, the Zhusu guesthouse next door, and the Gandise Hotel where Public Security Bureau (PSB) officers are stationed from spring until October, and where pilgrims must get their travel permit stamped, and buy a "ticket" if they wish to circumambulate Mt. Kailash. There are also a few houses, the Swiss-funded Tibetan Medical and Astro Institute and dispensary where doctors are trained in Traditional Tibetan medicine, a number of stores and kiosks, and some camping grounds. Traditionally, pilgrims only eat vegetarian food in the region due to its proximity to the sacred Lake Manasarovar and Mount Kailash.

== History ==
Darchen was once an exclave of Bhutan, held for almost 300 years and from where Bhutan raised revenue, until the People's Republic of China annexed it in 1959.

== Nearby monasteries ==
To the north of Tarqen there is a Tibetan Buddhist Monastery Qögu Gönba (ཆོས་སྐུ་དགོན་པ). Not very far to the south of Tarqen, the Qiu Gönba (Tibetan: བྱིའུ་དགོན་པ, Chinese: 极物寺, a.k.a. Jiu Monastery) is a Tibetan Buddhist Monastery at the settlement of Qiu or Jiu (བྱིའུ) or Xungba (གཞུང་པ) village of Parga township, by Lake Mapam Yumco.

== See also ==
- List of towns and villages in Tibet

== Bibliography ==
- Albinia, Alice. (2008) Empires of the Indus: The Story of a River. First American Edition (2010) W. W. Norton & Company, New York. ISBN 978-0-393-33860-7.
- Dorje, Gyurme. (2009) Tibet Handbook. Footprint Handbooks, Bath, England. ISBN 978-1-906098-32-2.
- Kotan Publishing (200) Mapping the Tibetan World. Reprint 2004. ISBN 0-9701716-0-9.
- Mayhew, Bradley and Kohn, Michael. (2005) Tibet. 6th Edition. ISBN 1-74059-523-8.
- Bubriski, Kevin and Abhimanyu Pandey. (2018) Kailash Yatra: a Long Walk to Mt Kailash through Humla. Penguin Random House, New Delhi. ISBN 978-0670091119
