= Rinchen Zangpo =

Tibetan lotsawa (958–1055)

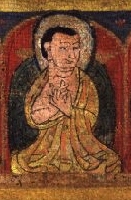
Richen Zangpo

Lochen Rinchen Zangpo (958–1055; Tibetan: རིན་ཆེན་བཟང་པོ་, Wylie: rin-chen bzang-po), also known as Mahaguru, was a principal lotsawa or translator of Sanskrit Buddhist texts into Tibetan during the second diffusion of Buddhism in Tibet, variously called the New Translation School, New Mantra School or New Tantra Tradition School. (Note: Tibetan: གསང་སྔགས་གསར་མ་, Wylie: gsang sngags gsar ma, THL: sang ngak sar ma.) He was a student of the famous Indian master, Atisha. His associates included (Locheng) Legpai Sherab. Zangpo's disciple Guge Kyithangpa Yeshepal wrote Zangpo's biography. He is said to have built over one hundred monasteries in Western Tibet, including the famous Tabo Monastery in Spiti, Himachal Pradesh, Poo in Kinnaur and Rinchenling monastery in Nepal.

Rinchen Zangpo had been sent as a young man by King Yeshe-Ö, the ruler of Zanskar, Guge, Spiti and Kinnaur, with other young scholars to Kashmir and other Buddhist centres to study and bring back Buddhist teachings to Western Tibet. He was possibly the single most important person for the 'Second Propagation of Buddhism' in Tibet. Some sources conflate him with his patron Yeshe-Ö as king of the western Himalayan Kingdom of Guge.

Among his translations are the Viśeṣastavaṭikā by Prajñāvarman, which he undertook together with Janārdhana.

== Bibliography ==
- Handa, O. C. (1987). Buddhist Monasteries in Himachal Pradesh. Indus Publishing Company, New Delhi.
- Kapadia, Harish. (1999). Spiti: Adventures in the Trans-Himalaya. Second Edition. Indus Publishing Company, New Delhi. ISBN 81-7387-093-4.
- McKay, Alex (ed.). (2003). Tibet and Her Neighbors: A History. Walther Konig. ISBN 3-88375-718-7
- Rizvi, Janet. (1996). Ladakh: Crossroads of High Asia. Second Revised Edition. Oxford University Press. ISBN 0-19-564546-4.
- Tucci, Giuseppe. (1988). Rin-chen-bzan-po and the Renaissance of Buddhism in Tibet Around the Millennium. First Italian Edition 1932. First draft English translation by Nancy Kipp Smith, under the direction of Thomas J. Pritzker. Edited by Lokesh Chandra. English version of Indo-Tibetica II. Aditya Rakashan, New Delhi. ISBN 81-85179-21-2.
