= Rutog =

Rutog may refer to:

- Rutog County, county in Tibet
- Rutog Town, town in Rutog County
- Rutog Dzong, historical Rutog town
