= 1954 Sino-Indian Agreement =

Agreement on trade relations between India and the Tibet region of China

The 1954 Sino-Indian Agreement, also called the Panchsheel Agreement, officially the Agreement on Trade and Intercourse Between Tibet Region and India, was signed by China and India in Peking on 29 April 1954. The preamble of the agreement stated the panchsheel, or the five principles of peaceful coexistence, that China proposed and India favoured. The agreement reflected the adjustment of the previously existing trade relations between Tibet and India to the changed context of India's decolonisation and China's assertion of suzerainty over Tibet. Bertil Lintner writes that in the agreement, "Tibet was referred to, for the first time in history, as 'the Tibet Region of China'".

The agreement expired on 6 June 1962, as per the original term limit, in the midst of the Sino-Indian border tensions. It was not renewed. By October of that year, war broke out between the two sides.

== Background ==
The background of the 1954 Agreement includes the Convention of Calcutta (between Britain and China, concerning Tibet), the Convention of Lhasa (between Britain and Tibet), the Convention Between Great Britain and China Respecting Tibet, the Anglo-Russian Convention, Anglo Chinese trade regulations of 1908 and 1914, the McMahon Line agreement between Tibet and British Raj, the failure of the Tibetan appeal to the UN, the Seven Point Agreement 1951 (between China and the Ganden Phodrang government of Tibet), the Sino-India negotiations concerning Tibet, 1951 to 1953, and the Sino–India conference on Tibetan trade and intercourse, December 1953 to April 1954.

=== Negotiations regarding inclusion of passes ===
In December 1953, the Sino–India conference on Tibetan trade and intercourse started. During the negotiations related to which passes to include, Indian diplomats were successful in the inclusion of only six passes. India tried putting forward other passes, but did not push China and backed away after China showed resistance. The Chinese also objected to the mention of Demchok as one of the passes.

According to Claude Arpi, the passes/routes mentioned by Delhi were:

- Tashigong, Gartok;
- Spanggur Tso To Rudok;
- Chiakang, Churkang, Ruksom;
- Tashigong, Churkang, Ruksom;
- Rudok, Ruksom, Rawang;
- Bodpo La;
- Shipki La;
- Keobarang;
- Shimdang;
- Gumrang (Khimokul);
- Tsang Chok La;
- Muling La;
- Mana Pass;
- Niti Pass;
- Tunjun La;
- Marhi La;
- Shalshal Pass;
- Kungri Bingri Pass;
- Darma Pass;
- Lampiya Dhura (Lampiya Lekh);
- Mangsha Dhura and
- Lipulekh.

== Summary of agreement ==
=== Preamble ===
The Five Principles of Peaceful Coexistence or Panchsheel upon which the articles of the treaty were based on are listed as:

1. mutual respect for each other's territorial integrity and sovereignty,
2. mutual non-aggression,
3. mutual non-interference in each other's internal affairs,
4. equality and mutual benefit, and
5. peaceful co-existing

=== Articles ===
Article I of the agreement paved the way for the establishment of Chinese trade agencies in New Delhi, Calcutta, and Kalimpong and Indian trade Agencies at Yatung, Gyantse, and Gartok. These trade agencies "would enjoy freedom from arrest while exercising their functions", among other privileges.

Article II stated that traders of both countries would trade at pre-determined places. "The Government of China agrees to specify Yatung, Gyantse, and Phari as markets for trade. The Government of India agrees that trade may be carried on in India, including places like, Kalimpong, Siliguri, and Calcutta, according to customary practice." Also, the "Government of China agrees to specify Gartok, Pulanchung (Taklakot), Gyanima-Khargo, Gyanima-Chakra, Ramura, Dongbra, Puling-Sumdo, Nabra, Shangtse, and Tashigong as markets for trade"; and in the future the Government of India shall specify markets "on the basis of equality and reciprocity to do so".

Article III covered pilgrimages by religious believers of the two countries and outlined certain provisions for pilgrims of both countries.

Article IV pointed out some passes and routes which traders and pilgrims may use: Shipki La pass, Mana pass, Niti pass, Kungri Bingri pass, Dharma pass, and Lipu Lekh pass.

Article V covered details related to certificates issued to traders that permitted traders to use other routes than those mentioned in Article IV as well as border transit procedures.

Article VI outlined that "upon ratification by both Governments and shall remain in force for eight (8) years" and the procedure for extension.

The agreement was signed Nedyam Raghavan, Plenipotentiary of the Government of the Republic of India, and Chang Han Fu, Plenipotentiary of the Central People's Government, People's Republic of China. Raghavan was the Indian Ambassador while Chang Han-fu was the Chinese Deputy Foreign Minister.

Further notes were exchanged.

== Criticism ==
Commentators in the West and also within India viewed the agreement as a "diplomatic blunder" on the part of Prime Minister Jawaharlal Nehru, especially after the 1962 war.

== Bibliography ==
- Bhasin, Avtar Singh (2021), Nehru, Tibet and China, Penguin Random House, ISBN 9780670094134
- Hoffmann, Steven A. (1990), India and the China Crisis, University of California Press, ISBN 978-0-520-06537-6
  - Hoffmann, Steven A. (2018) [first published 1990], India and the China Crisis, University of California Press, ISBN 978-0-520-06537-6
- Hsiao, Gene T. (2021), The Foreign Trade of China: Policy, Law, and Practice, Univ of California Press, ISBN 9780520315754
- Lintner, Bertil (2018), China's India War: Collision Course on the Roof of the World, OUP India, ISBN 978-0-19-909163-8
- Menon, Shivshankar (2016), Choices: Inside the Making of India's Foreign Policy, Brookings Institution Press, ISBN 978-0-8157-2911-2
- Raghavan, Srinath (2010), War and Peace in Modern India, Palgrave Macmillan, ISBN 978-1-137-00737-7
