= Bangda Lake =

Glacial lake in Tibet, China

- Yeshil Kul
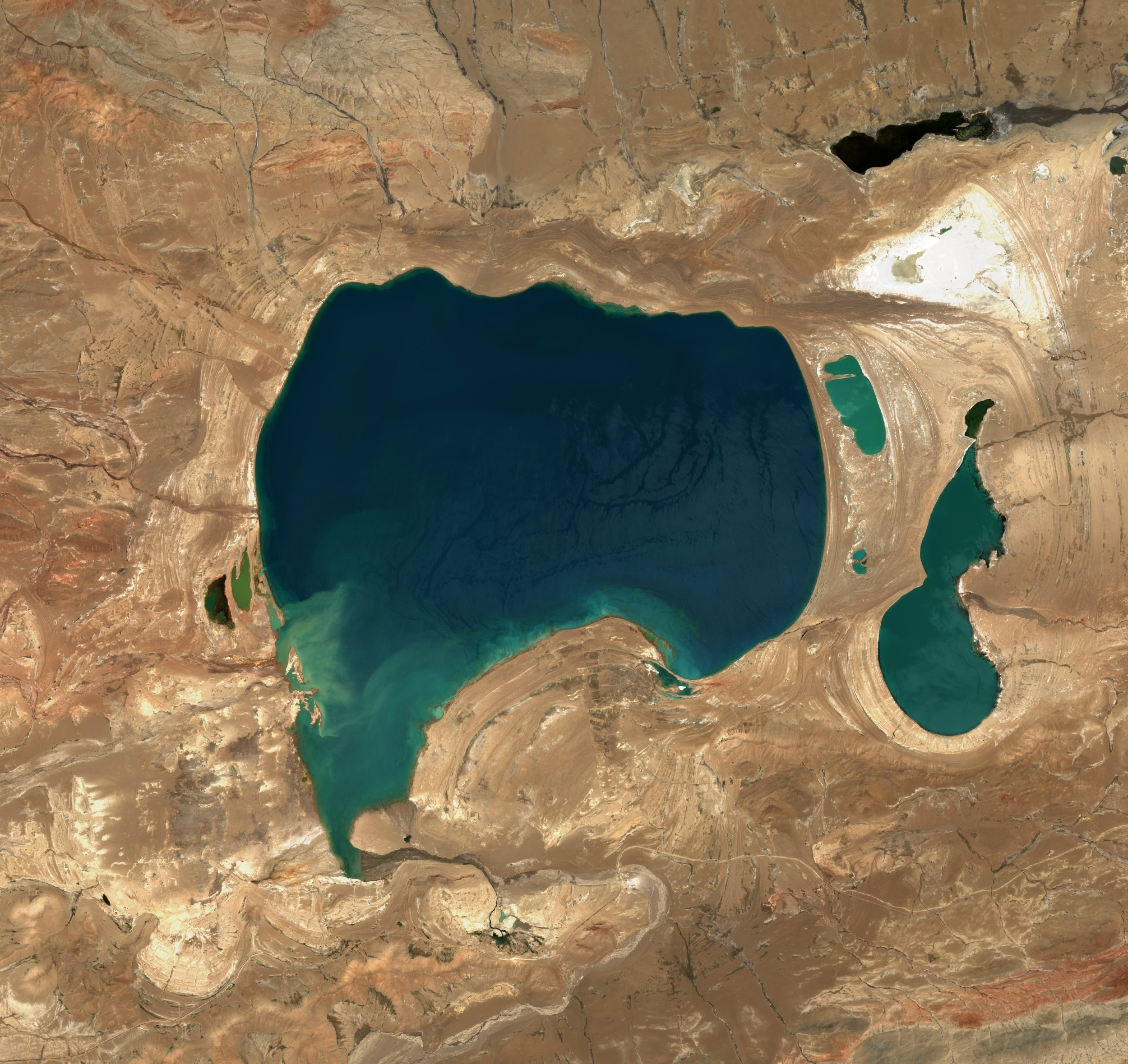
- Sentinel-2 image (2021)

- Location within Ngari
- Location: Rutog County, Ngari Prefecture, Tibet Autonomous Region, China
- Coordinates: 34°56′56″N 81°34′16″E
- Catchment area: 3,314.5 km^{2} (1,300 sq mi)
- Basin countries: China
- Max. length: 15 km (9 mi)
- Max. width: 9.7 km (6 mi)
- Surface area: 106.5 km^{2} (0 sq mi)
- Surface elevation: 4,902 m (16,083 ft)

Bangda Lake (Tibetan: པང་བཏགས་མཚོ, Wylie: pang btags mtsho, THL: pang tak tso; Chinese: 邦达错; pinyin: Bāngdá Cuò), (Note: Other forms include Bangdag, Pangtak and Pantak.) formerly called Yeshil Kul, (Note: Variations include Yashil Kul, Yashil Tso, Yashil Cho, Yahsierh Tso.) is a glacial lake in Ngari Prefecture in the northwest of the Tibet Autonomous Region of China. It lies south of the western Kunlun Mountains, only a few kilometres to the southeast of Guozha Lake (Lake Lighten). Located at an altitude of 4902 metres, it covers an area of 106 square kilometres with a maximum depth of 21.6 metres and has a drainage basin containing 90 glaciers.

== Location ==
Located at an elevation of 4,902 metres (16,083 ft), the Bangda Lake covers an area of 106 square kilometres with a maximum depth of 21.6 metres and contains 90 glaciers.

Yeshil Kul is located along an ancient travel route between Ladakh and Khotan via the Keriya Pass. The route runs along the Longmu Co fault up to Yeshil Kul, and then heads north to the Keriya Pass, after which the valleys of the Iksu, Polu and Keriya rivers are followed.

A "Xinjiang–Tibet Highway" was laid by the People's Republic of China between the Polu town and the vicinity of the Bangda Lake during 1950–1951, prior to its annexation of Tibet. Jeep tracks were then made over the relatively flat, hard terrain of the Longmu Co fault, leading to Rudok. A regular jeep traffic had commenced by 1953. China has recently constructed a highway that runs along the fault connecting the G219 and G216 highways.

== Maps ==
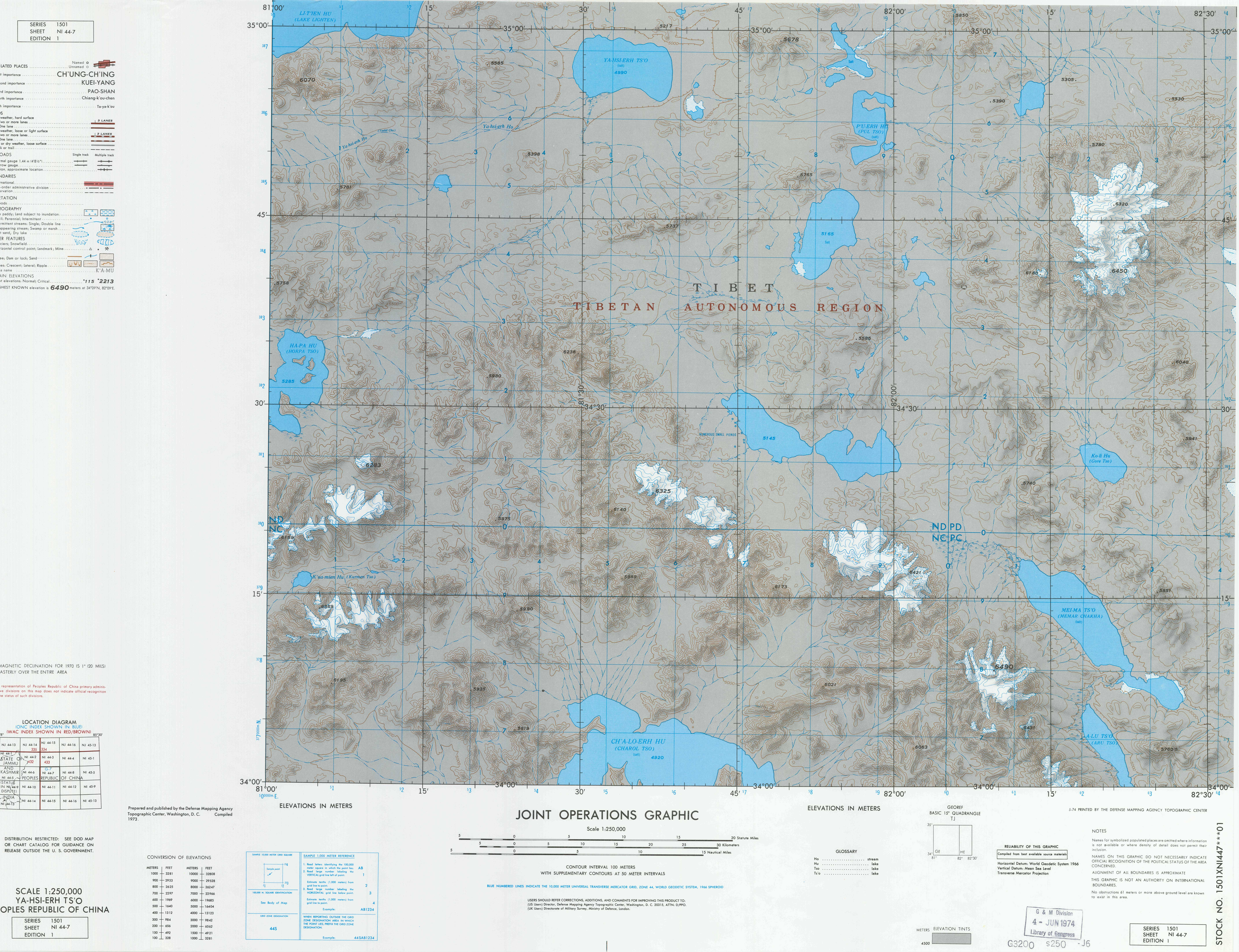
Map including Yahsierh Tso (Yeshil Kul)

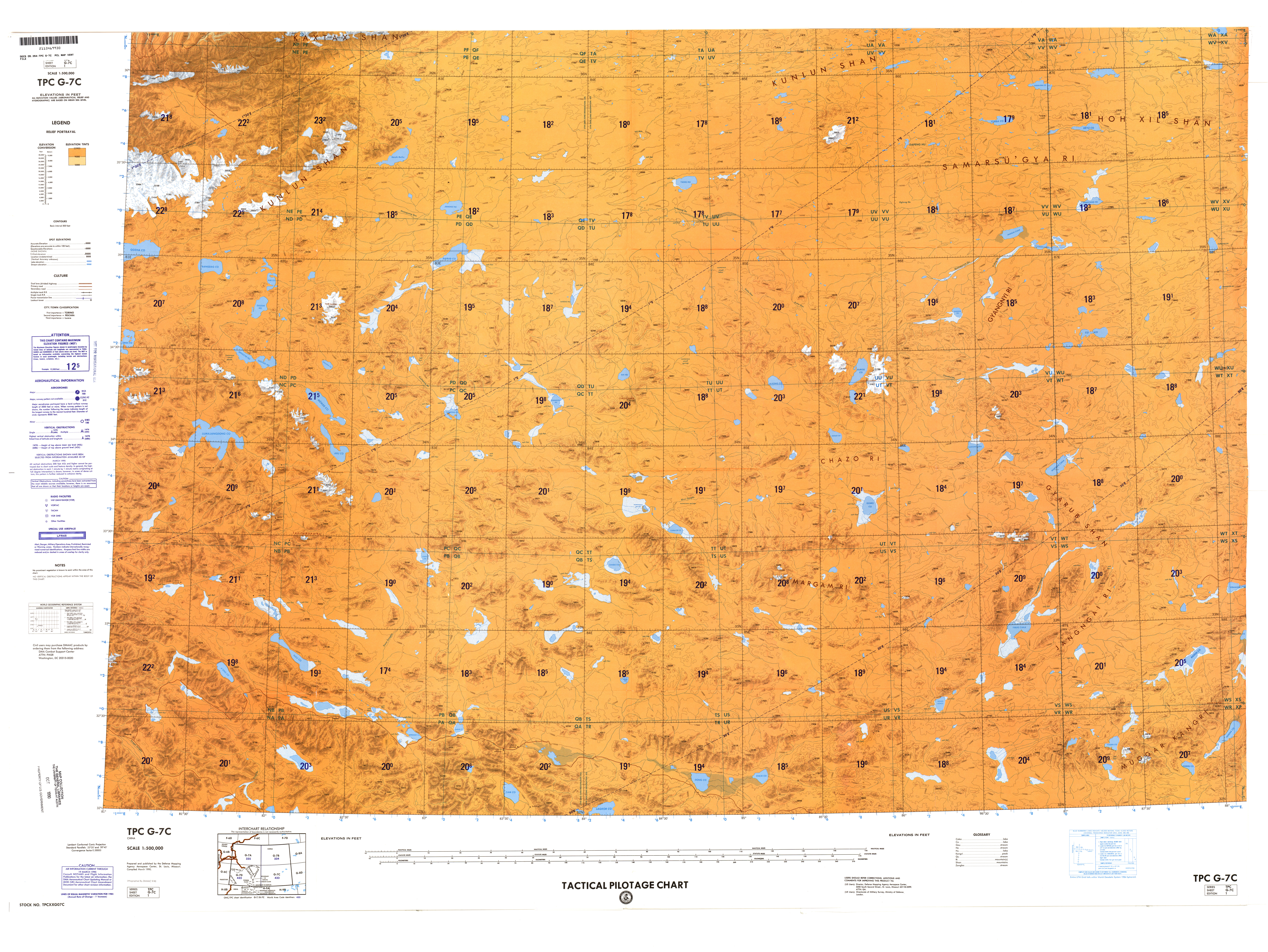
Map including Bangdag Co
