= Barahoti =

Barahoti Wu-Je
- Pasture land
- Barahoti
- Location within Uttarakhand Location within India
- Coordinates: 30.8333°N 79.9667°E
- Country: India
- District: Chamoli
- State: Uttarakhand
- Elevation: 4,700 m (15,400 ft)
- Time zone: UTC+5:30 (IST)

Barahoti (Bara Hoti, Hoti Plain), located in the 'middle sector' of the disputed Sino-Indian border, is a 3.9 square kilometres (1.5 sq mi) sloping plain situated in the Indian state of Uttarakhand, Chamoli district. It is disputed by China, which also disputes a 750 square kilometres (290 sq mi) area surrounding it. The entire disputed area also goes by the name "Barahoti", or sometimes "Barahoti–Sangchamalla–Lapthal disputed area". The entire area is on the Ganges side of the Sutlej–Ganges water divide, which is also the current Line of Actual Control between India and China.

Barahoti was the first location in Indian territory claimed by China in 1954. and is also called Wu-Je or Wure (Chinese: 乌热; pinyin: Wū rè). In 1960, China added Lapthal and Sangchamalla to the dispute and said that three places formed one composite area.

== Geography ==
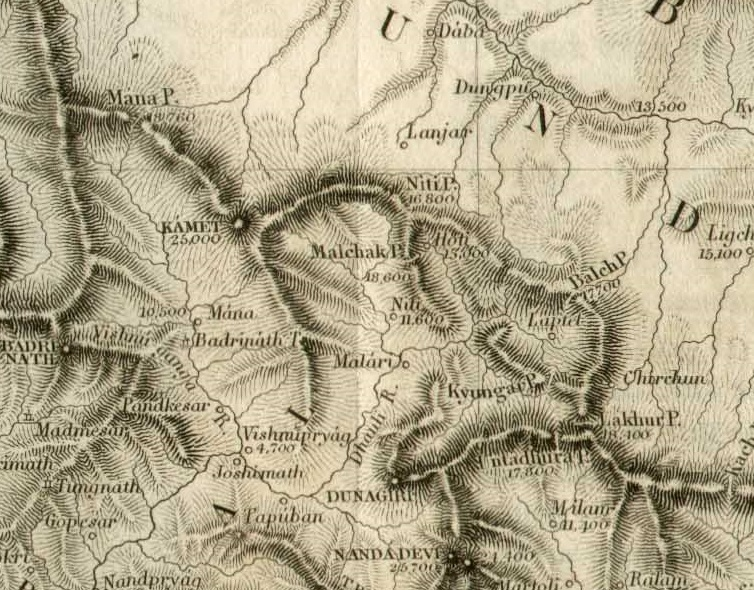
Map 1: The Barahoti disputed area in a map by Henry Strachey (1851); (Note: This map shows a ridge to the north of the Girthi Ganga river, but omits the ridge to its south. The omitted ridge is the one indicated in the Himalayan Gazetteer.) the pastures Barahoti, Lapthal and Sangcha lie in the oval shaped bowl at the right.

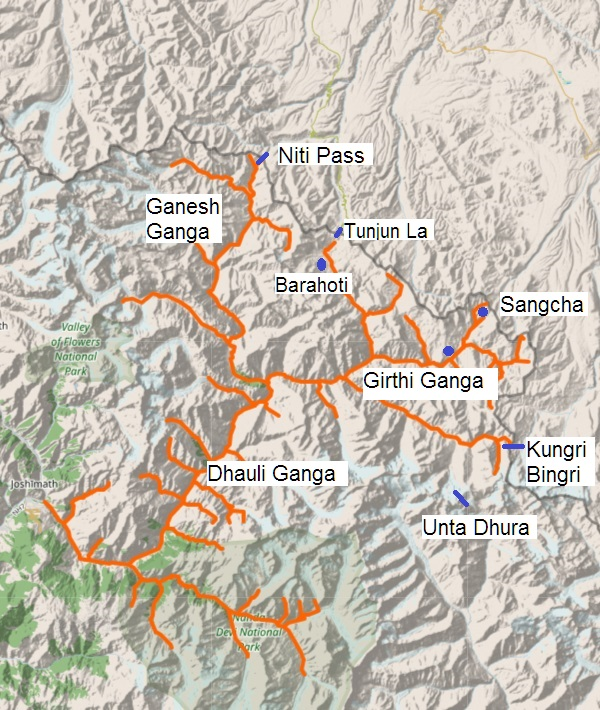
Map 2: Dhauliganga River basin; the river cuts through the crest of the Himalaya indicated by the glaciated ridge line (shaded light blue). Passes are marked in blue. Not marked on this map are also Mahri la & Shalshal la passes between Tunjun la & Sangcha pass, and Balcha-Dhura la between Sangcha pass and Kungri-Bingri la.

The Himalayan Gazetteer (1884) states that the watershed that forms the boundary between India and Tibet in the region of Uttarakhand is "a simple longitudinal range" for the most part, but its structure is a little complicated between the Niti Pass and Unta Dhura. Here the ridge that might have otherwise formed the watershed is broken through by the Girthi Ganga river and its tributaries (the Hoti and Lapthal rivers) and, therefore, the watershed is thrown to the northeast by about 10 miles. (Maps 1 and 2)

The three large pastures of Barahoti, Lapthal and Sangcha lie within this region. The region is bounded in the northeast (Note: It is northeast by compass direction. But sources often refer to it as "north", and the other directions in a corresponding way.) by a continuous ridge with passes called Niti, Tunjun, Marhi, Shalshal, Balcha and Kungri Bingri, beyond which lay the "great plateau of Guge". The Line of Actual Control (LAC) between India and China lies on this ridge. To the southwest of the region is the ridge line mentioned in the Himalayan Gazetteer, with a narrow gorge in the middle. The northwestern half of the ridge line is the Hoti ridge, separating the Niti valley and the Hoti river valley. The southeastern half is the ridge that bounds the Girthi Ganga valley. The narrow gorge between the two halves houses the Girthi Ganga river and was said to have been impassable for human travellers. The only access traditionally was over the bounding ridges via mountain passes.

Further southwest of the region are the glaciated high ridges of Himalaya, one in the west (belonging to the Kamet Group) and one in the east (belonging to the Nanda Devi Group). Between the two lies the valley of the Dhauliganga River. (Map 2)

The Barahoti pasture is a sloping plain that is said to be 3.9 square kilometres (1.5 sq mi) in area. It is about 4 km southwest of Tunjun La (4921m, 30.8778°N 79.9810°E) on the bank of the Hoti river (or Yong Gad). The main pasture is on the northeastern face of the Hoti ridge. It can be crossed from the Niti valley via two passes, the Chor Hoti pass (5360m, 30.7993°N 79.9151°E) and Marchauk La (5560m, 30.8384°N 79.9085°E). The Chor Hoti pass leads to the valley of Rimkim Gad, at the bottom of which (known as Rimkhim) India currently has a border police post.

In addition to the main pasture, sources also speak of the "Barahoti bowl", which appears to include the entire drainage basin of the Hoti river, which contains several smaller pastures. The Chinese diplomats refer to it as "Wu-Je" (or Wure) and describe it as 15 km long (along the border ridge) and 10 km wide. Indian news reports also mention an 80 square kilometre-area.

Lapthal (or Laptel, 30.7333°N 80.1333°E Chinese: 拉不底) is a large pasture towards the eastern end of the bowl. It is on the bank of the Lapthal river (or Kio Gad) in the Pithoragarh district of Kumaon. It is accessed from the Johar Valley of the Pithoragarh district via Unta Dhura (5350m, 30.5763°N 80.1725°E), through the Girthi Ganga valley, and the Kyungar La pass (5250m, 30.6509°N 80.1588°E).

Sangcha (30.7749°N 80.1722°E Chinese: 香扎) is a third pasture in the bowl, northeast of Lapthal, on a tributary of a stream called Jhangu Gad below the Balcha Dhura pass (5338m, 30.7867°N 80.1924°E). It has two named campsites, Sangcha-talla and Sancha-malla ("lower and upper Sangcha"), the latter of which entered the Chinese nomenclature as "Barahoti–Lapthal–Sangchamalla area".

A side route from the Unta Dhura pass leads to the top of the Girthi Ganga valley, where there is a pass called Kungri Bingri (Kingri Bingri, or Lakhur pass, 5540m, 30.6249°N 80.2127°E) into Tibet. The Bhotiya traders of the Johar valley in Pithoragarh have traditionally used this route for their trade with Tibet. Some traders would also cross into the Lapthal valley via Kyungar La and reach the Shalshal Pass (4940m, 30.8225°N 80.0700°E) in the middle of the boundary ridge.

== History ==
=== 1700s ===
Two land-deeds —one sanctioned by P'olha in 1729 and another by 7th Dalai Lama in 1737 — support that the boundary lay just north of Barahoti, in the opinion of India. In contrast, China interprets the documents to regard Barahoti (Wu-je) as part of Daba Dzong.

=== 1842–1887 ===
Frontier villages in the Kumaon —that served as important conduits in the trans-Tibetan trade of Bhotias— were exempted from paying any taxes to the British authority at the behest of then-commissioner G. T. Lushington, c. late 1842. By and large a fiscal tactic to revitalise a thawed trade, the policy was warmly welcomed by Bhotias and met with success. (Note: The extent of its contribution, amidst a spectrum of realpolitik factors, to the revitalisation is debatable.) However, that Tibet collected a variety of taxes (incl. land tax) from these areas, Lushington was soon advised to assert territorial sovereignty; he refused to tamper with "long established" customs lest it fomented a needless enmity with Tibet and affected the trade.

Lushington died six years later but his policies would be practised for about the next fifty years despite occasional disturbances, as at Barahoti. (Note: In 1884, one major-general G.N. Channer went on a hunting trip and came across Tibet collecting land-taxes from (what was apparently) British territory. Since about 1895, he would take up this cause and repeatedly urge his higher-ups to terminate "the malpractices of the Thibetan Jongpen"; then-Commissioner Sanderson was hardly fond of Tibet's ways either. In light of confluent claims to sovereignty for multiple decades, there appeared to be significant confusion on the location of the actual border and it was agreed upon to have the Bhotias recognize themselves as British subjects at the earliest and stall Tibetan intrigues by themselves. However, the Bhotias hardly cared for British interests and went about defending the payment of land-taxes as a tradition, to secure their relations with Tibet. A direct proposal was also floated before the Tibetan Governor who rejected it outright. As the trade got severely affected, the Government restricted Tibet from venturing to its territories for collection of taxes but allowed them to charge the Bhotias in their own territory – of whatever form.) K. Gopalachari, an Indian officer of the Historical Division of the Ministry of External Affairs writing for the International Studies Journal, notes Barahoti to have had paid taxes to Garhwal Kingdom, since at-least 1815.

In 1848, explorer R. Strachey remarked the area to be claimed by Tibet, despite lying within the watershed (and falling within Britain's understanding of their boundary with Tibet). He went on to note that the native Bhotias had hardly any ideas about the precise boundaries, and found the issue unworthy of any settlement — "geographers on both sides may [be] left to put the boundary in their maps where they please". The following year, he would pass through Barahoti into Tibet via the Tunjun-la pass and consider it to be British territory in his maps.

In 1866, surveyor Nain Singh had noted of Lhasa's frontier-camp to be situated at Lapthal — he was interrogated about the purpose of his visit.

=== 1888 ===
Tibetan intrusions into Barahoti were first reported in June 1888 — explorer Kishan Singh observed some ten or twelve Tibetans to have set up a camp, locally known as the Guard House.

=== 1889 ===
A near-similar event occurred around September 1889 and they even compelled the touring Assistant Commissioner of Kumaon to withdraw to safety.

The local Patwari (Durga Dutt), unable to resist the intrusion, intimated the Commissioner of Kumaon Division who in turn, informed the Foreign Office. Also, Dutt arranged for a letter to be dispatched to the governor of the adjacent Tibetan province about violations of boundary via two of the intruding Tibetans themselves (Jampal and Panda) but the letter was returned without being opened, a few days later. Soon, commissioner Erskine confirmed that a Tibetan customs-house was operating in what was British territory, but felt no need to raise any hullaballoo over it.

However, back in the Foreign Office, Undersecretary G. R. Irwin (and others) deemed of it to be an encroachment which ought not be tolerated and a 200 strong column of sepoys was dispatched from Sobha around early November, 1889. But by the time they reached Barahoti —late November— winter was in its peak, and Tibetans had long retreated back. Major Pulley remarked that Barahoti exhibited not a sign of life and it was hard for him to imagine a more desolate and uninhabitable place.

C. W. Brown, in his magnum opus on Tibetan-Bhotia trade, feels Britain to have had fundamentally misunderstood Tibet's actions. Lhasa had gone about its usual practice of vesting ordinary natives (typically two to four) from its frontier villages as messengers to declare the trading session open, collect due trade-taxes from a temporary outpost, and prevent non-complying (Bhotiya) traders from entering into Tibet. There was no motive to usurp territory.

=== 1890 ===
In early June 1890, a few Tibetans were back at Barahoti and a picket was reestablished. To and fro discussions proliferated within the concerned ministry about tackling the issue though some doubted whether it was a cause, significant enough to pursue. However, the government soon perceived the traders to be acting on behalf of Tibet in that they enforced certain "bonds" on natives.

On 29 June the Government decided to ask the North-Western Provinces to deal with these intrusions strictly, and enforce territorial claims at Barahoti. Two days later, on the basis of a letter from the local patwari (Durga Dutta), the ministry evaluated that Tibet had acknowledged British sovereignty over Barahoti, and only engaged in routine cross-border trade. However, the letter was "not lucidly written" and officials proposed that a civil officer be sent to the disputed territory for dual purposes of conducting a detailed investigation as well as enforcing territorial sovereignty.

In November, the Deputy Collector of Kumaon (Dharma Nand Joshi) was sent down to convince the Serji about the alignment of international boundary along a series of mountain-passes and the watershed, running north of Barahoti. However, he was suggested to take his concerns to Lhasa.

=== 1905 ===
In 1905, Charles A Sherring, a fellow of the Royal Geographical Society (and Deputy Commissioner in the Indian Civil Services) toured across Western Tibet from India. He noted of Barahoti to lie in Indian territory, and the border pass at Tunjun-la.

=== 1914 ===
In the Simla Convention, Charles Alfred Bell intimated Paljor Dorje Shatra about Barahoti lying within British territory; the border was claimed to pass through Tunjun-la pass and a map was provided to the same effect.

According to India, that Tibet failed to raise any objections, the principle of acquiescence applies. China rejects this interpretation. Shatra had only wished to "investigate the matter" and Tibet continued to send troops for years, implying a rejection of Bell's arguments.

=== 1952 ===
In July 1952, the Indian Intelligence Bureau (IB) prepared a note titled "Border Disputes and Collection of Taxes by Tibetans in Garhwal District". It stated that there appeared to be a border dispute regarding the Barahoti plain. After recounting the history during the British Raj, it remarked that Tibetans appear to have reestablished a post at Barahoti in the recent years. It recounted an incident in 1951, when the Dzongpen of Daba took umbrage at Indian traders setting up trade at the Hoti plain and even served them notices. The IB went on to criticize the absence of Garhwal authorities in the region (Note: However, mountaineers Gurdial Singh and R. Greenwood noted that, in 1951, the Uttar Pradesh Provincial Armed Constabulary had set up a camp in Barahoti running between June and September. Two members of the P.A.C. even helped them to climb Pt. 17,750.) and speculated that, if the Tibetans were allowed to continue their activity, they might eventually claim the territory. It supported the idea of the Deputy Commissioner visiting Barahoti annually with an armed escort and hoisting the Indian flag.

The Ministry of External Affairs, however, believed that the Tibetan officials' actions were due to suffering loss of revenue as the Indian traders were not using the customary trading location at Nabra in Tibet. The State Government (Note: The Barahoti region was part of the state of Uttar Pradesh in 1952; it became part of Uttarakhand when it was split off from Uttar Pradesh in 2000.) disagreed that any "encroachment" had taken place in any area barring the odd Tibetan tax-collectors, who nonetheless went back on persuasion. Highlighting the difficulty of arranging any meaningful defence at such remote high altitude locations, (Note: A couple of months earlier, The Ministry of Defence itself had noted of such difficulties in its comments on the situation in Nilang/Jadhang. It urged the MEA to claim only those disputed territories which could be "effectively protected or controlled".) it hoped for a quick diplomatic resolution to avoid such sporadic "embarrassment".

=== 1953–1954 ===
For the 1954 trade agreement, India had proposed to include 22 border-passes with China, including the Niti Pass, Tunjun La, Marhi La, Shalshal Pass and Kungri Bingri pass. China is believed to have objected to them and, in the end, only the Niti Pass and Kungri Bingri Pass in the vicinity of the Barahoti area were included. This left the door open for China to contest the areas below the other passes.

On 17 July 1954, two months after signing the agreement, China lodged an official complaint about thirty Indian troops invading into "Wu-je of the Ali [Ngari] area of the Tibet region of China". It claimed that they had crossed Niti Pass in order to do so, which was said to be in violation of the Panchsheel. China requested India to withdraw all troops from the area. India responded that the troops were stationed at the Barahoti plain, which is "south-east of the Niti Pass and in Indian territory". India also pointed out that some Tibetan officials had attempted to enter Barahoti without proper documents. These accusations and counter-accusations would proliferate over the next three years.

=== 1955 ===
On 28 June, India alleged that Chinese troops were camping at Hoti without proper documents. China rejected the claims and a fortnight later, complained about twenty five Indian troops having "crossed into Wu-je" around 25 June to construct fortifications, close to their garrison. In a reply, MEA emphasised that such steps were only taken in Barahoti and expressed doubt about the exact location of Wu-je — Chinese ambassador had noted it to lie 12 miles north of Tunjun-La while Barahoti laid south of the pass.

In mid-August, India noted that a Tibetan official had trespassed into Hoti to collect grazing taxes from Indian herdsmen only to meet with a refutation and counter-claims of Indian troops having crossed into Wu-je and engaging in "reconnaissance activities on the Chinese Garrison". In November, India reiterated its previous claims, reemphasized that Barahoti laid 2 miles south of the pass, and blamed the Chinese for intruding into Barahoti and setting up camps close to Indian forces; it also noted that an Indian detachment had spotted Chinese Forces camping about 12 miles South of Niti Pass, in Damzan. Finally, winter brought an end to these disputes.

=== 1956–57 ===
The next year, as the area became approachable with the advent of summer and yet simmering for dispute, Beijing proposed that a joint-expedition to these areas be mounted. It further suggested that both the sides agree to not send any troops until the cartographic dispute was resolved via diplomatic channels. However, it asserted of "historical records" bearing evidence to the fact of Tunjun-la being in Chinese territory, rather than some border pass. A memorandum was submitted to these effects on 8 June.

A week later India accepted the proposal but it was subject to China accepting Tunjun-la as the border. Some futile negotiations notwithstanding, neither party budged and around October, the investigation was dropped. However, India accepted the clause of not using force and China affirmed it in February 1957. Thus, no disputes would arise throughout the year. Later that year, China would again raise requests for holding a conference (followed by a joint-investigation) on Barahoti.

=== 1958–61 ===
==== Conference ====
In February 1958, Subimal Dutt (Foreign Sec. of India) proposed to Prime Minister Nehru that India agree to hold a conference — it would allow a glimpse into the workings of Chinese mind on at least one border dispute even if India were to accept the superiority of Chinese claims. Accordingly, one was held from 19 April to 3 May 1958.

The talks failed with Dutt highlighting, in particular, about how China refused to divulge the precise geographic coordinates of Wu-je —vaguely defined as south of Tunjun-la; ran for 15 km (north to south) and 10 km (east to west)— and instead proposed a joint-investigation, which was likely a tactic to map their claims. He also found out India's case to be far stronger than he had presumed, and while India had nothing to lose from accepting a southward shift of border at Barahoti, there were far integral issues at play — China sought to reject all British maps as tools of colonial knowledge and repudiate the principle of watershed. If India conceded once, it would be hard to negotiate other border disputes. He then sought Nehru's consent to have civil officials regularly visit Barahoti, that China did not accept India's proposal to prohibit such visits.

Nehru would later intimate premier Zhou about how the Chinese delegation failed to provide any material evidence contrary to the "extensive documentary evidence", submitted by Indian side.

==== Disputes ====
Hardly had the talks ended, than China complained of armed Indian officials arriving in the area on July 8. India deemed it to be routine "revenue settlement operations" by the Government of Uttar Pradesh, mounted only as a reciprocation to China sending their civil officials on 29 June but rejected the charges of carrying arms. Later that year, according to Indian Government, once winter set in and Indian border posts were dismantled, two adjacent areas (on east and west) —Lapthal and Sangchamalla— were intruded by Chinese troops only for China to claim all the three places (individually) next year.

On 23 January 1959, in a letter to Nehru, Zhou regretted the delay in arriving at a settlement about Wu-je, being hampered by the lack of on-spot investigations; he went on to refer to all relevant disputes as "minor affairs", which were impossible to avoid pending a formal delineation of boundary.

In May 1959, Nehru claimed in the Lower House of Parliament that as Indian troops made to Barahoti in summer (c. a couple of weeks back), they did not spot any Chinese forces and as of then, the only inhabitants were an unarmed police party from the Uttar Pradesh Government. He emphasised that pending renewal of negotiations on a rather minor affair, the territory was being considered as a neutral zone and the government did not plan on tackling the characteristic winter aggression of China by stationing forces. (Note: A few months later, Nehru would again defend his choice of keeping Barahoti undefended in winter — anybody who was stationed at Barahoti in winter, was to be cutoff from the rest of India for about seven months and such drastic measures were hardly warranted. He went on to emphasise that people do not get emotionally attached to disputes that were inherited as a colonial legacy.)

in 1960, China would claim the composite area spanning across the three places were included in '59 as disputed territories.

=== 2000–present ===
The border continue to be undemarcated in the area and the plains remain a demilitarised zone patrolled by Indo-Tibetan Border Police who do not carry firearms. As per an agreement in 2005, firearms in the area are not allowed.

In 2013, the Chief Minister of Uttarakhand told New Delhi that 37 incursion attempts had been made between 2007 and 2012 in Barahoti. In contrast, an IB note had documented 120 intrusions across 2010 and 2011. Transgressions have been reported by the Indian media almost every year. Small Hindu shrines, established by Indian patrol parties, have reportedly been pulled down multiple times.

Anthropologist Nayanika Mathur notes that Barahoti remains a forgotten non-state space and is hardly visible in local discourse — it is primarily used by the Bhotiya tribesmen and their Tibetan counterparts as a grazing ground.

== Bibliography ==
- Arpi, Claude (August 2020). "The History of Barahoti Plain" (PDF).
- Atkinson, Edwin Thomas (1981) [1884], The Himalayan Gazetteer, Volume 3, Part 2, Cosmo Publications – via archive.org
- Bajpai, S. C. (May 1964), "Barahoti—On Sino-Indian Border: An Historical Appraisal", Parliamentary Studies, Volumes 7-10, Indian Bureau of Parliamentary Studies
- Gopalachari, K. (1963-01-01). "The India-China Boundary Question". International Studies. 5 (1–2): 33–42. doi:10.1177/002088176300500103. ISSN 0020-8817. S2CID 154040023.
- Gupta, Shishir (2014), The Himalayan Face-Off: Chinese Assertion and the Indian Riposte, Hachette India, ISBN 978-93-5009-606-2
- Hamond, Robert (1942). "Through Western Tibet in 1939". The Geographical Journal. 99 (1): 1–12. doi:10.2307/1788090. ISSN 0016-7398. JSTOR 1788090.
- Hoffmann, Steven A. (1990), India and the China Crisis, University of California Press, ISBN 978-0-520-06537-6
- Raghavan, Srinath (2010), War and Peace in Modern India, Palgrave Macmillan, ISBN 978-1-137-00737-7
- Sherring, Charles A. (1906), Western Tibet and the British Borderland, T. G. Longstaff, Edward Arnold – via archive.org
