= Aweng Cuo =

Alpine lake in Tibet

- Aweng Tso
- ཨ་ལོང་མཚོ (Standard Tibetan)
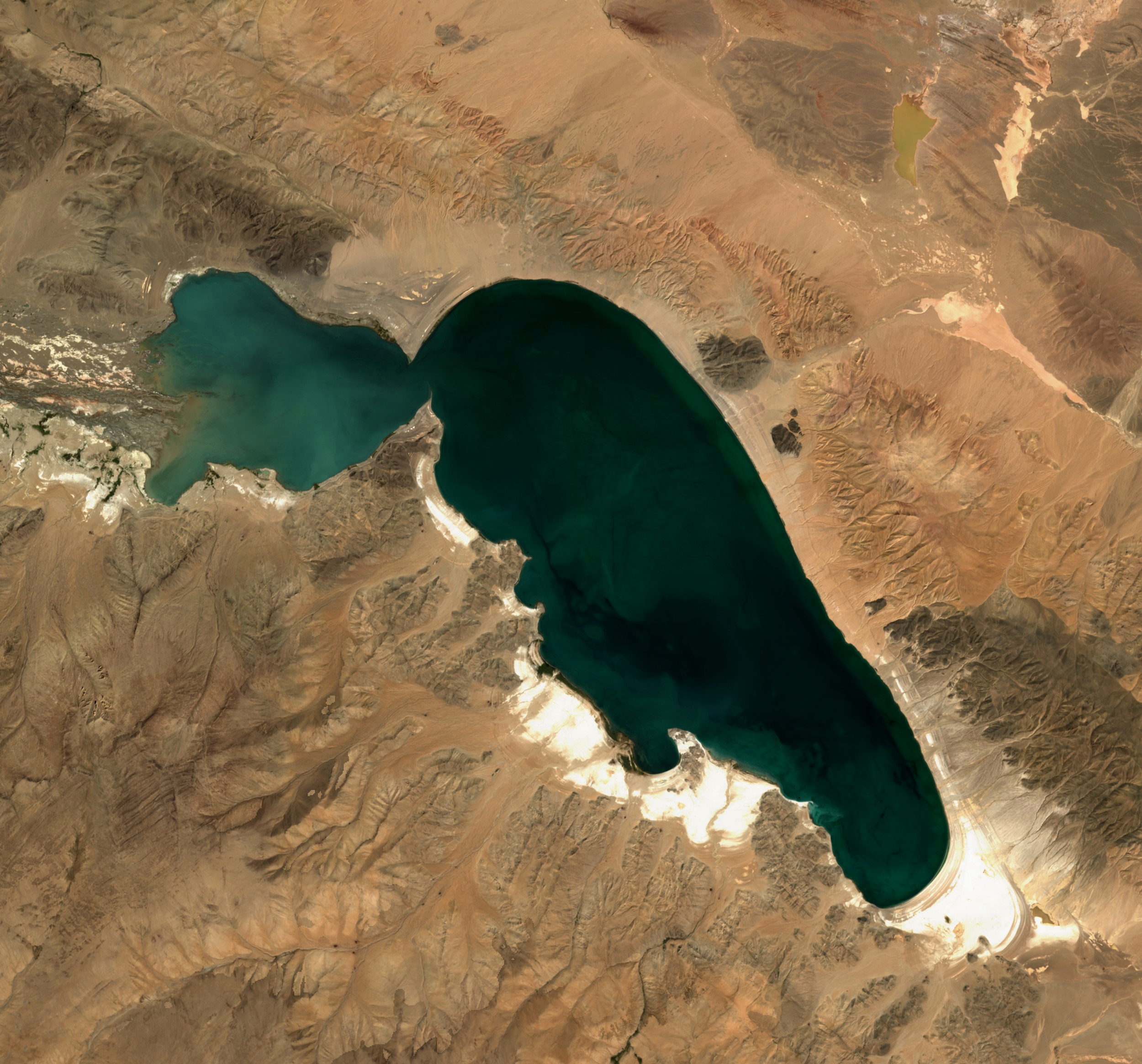
- Sentinel-2 image (2021)

- Location within Tibet
- Location: Ritu County, Ali Prefecture, Tibet, China
- Coordinates: 32°45′48″N 81°44′01″E
- Surface area: 56 km^{2} (22 sq mi)
- Surface elevation: 4,425 m (14,518 ft)
- Frozen: Winter

Aweng Cuo or Aweng Co (Chinese: 阿翁错; pinyin: awng cuò) or Aweng Tso (Tibetan: ཨ་ལོང་མཚོ, Wylie: aweng mtsho, THL: aweng tso) is a high-altitude alpine lake in Tibet, China.

== Location ==
The lake is located at 4,425 m (14,518 ft) above sea level in Ritu County, Ali Prefecture of Tibet Autonomous Region. Lhasa, the regional capital is located 960 km east of the lake.

The lake covers an area of 56 square km in its entirety. It extends for a total of 10.3 km east to west and 12.1 km in the north–south direction.

== Climate ==
During the Holocene, the Indian monsoon had the most significant impact on Aweng Cuo. At the beginning of the Holocene epoch, when the summer insolation was at its highest point, the monsoonal impact was powerful, and the climate was warm and moist. During the middle of the Holocene (6–3 ka), the summer and winter insolation were relatively weak, and Aweng Cuo was chilly and dry. This suggests that the Indian monsoon became less powerful during this time.
