= Orba Co =

- འོར་པ་མཚོ (Standard Tibetan)
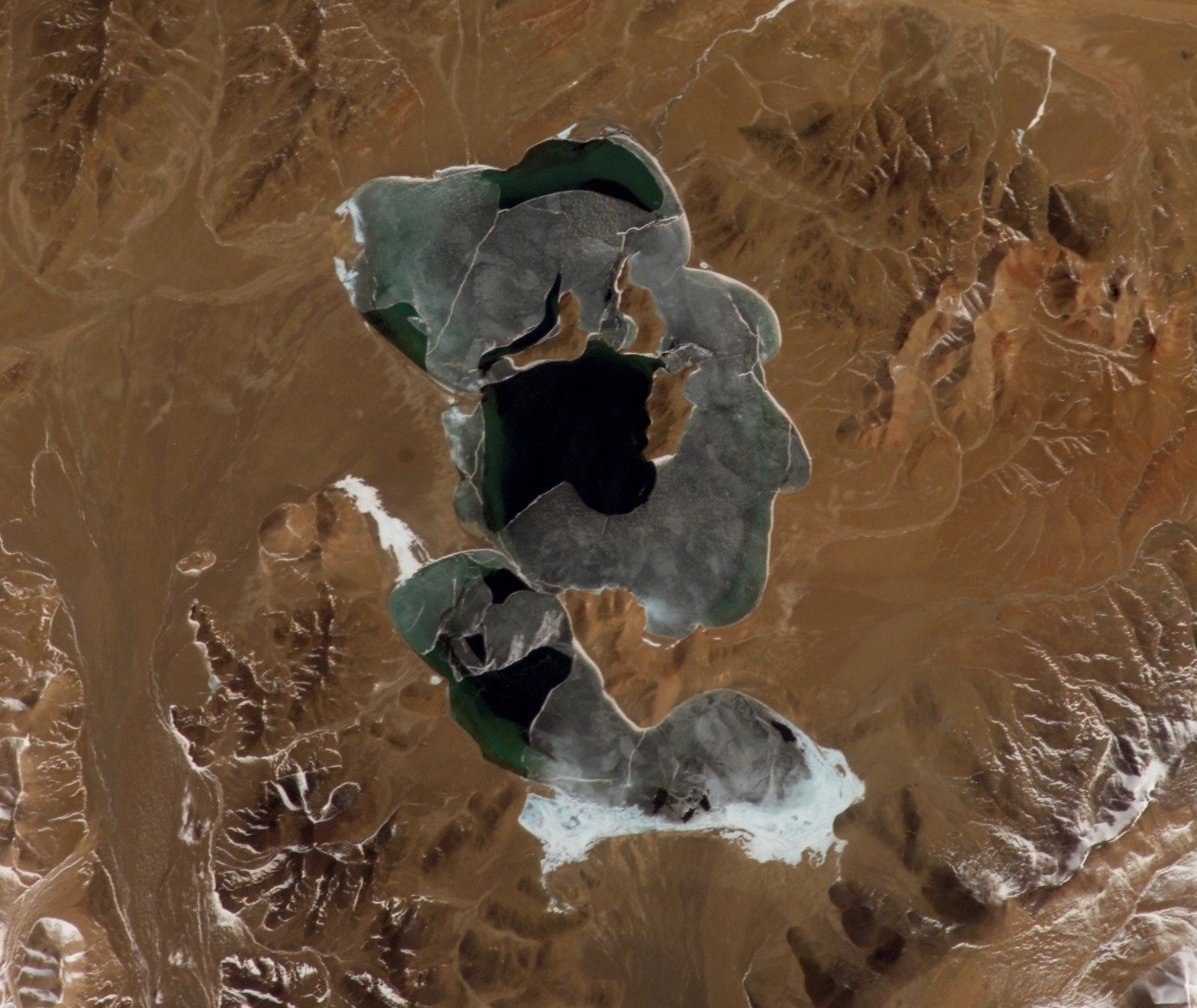
- View of lake taken during ISS Expedition 14

- Location within Ngari
- Location: Rutog County, Ngari Prefecture, Tibet Autonomous Region
- Coordinates: 34°32′44″N 81°2′21″E
- Type: Lake
- Surface elevation: 5,209 m (17,090 ft)
- Islands: Four

Orba Co, also Wo Erba or Wo Erbacuo (Chinese: 窝尔巴错; pinyin: Wōěrbā cuò; Tibetan: འོར་པ་མཚོ, Wylie: 'or pa mtsho), is a saline lake in Rutog County in the Ngari Prefecture in the northwest of the Tibet Autonomous Region of China.

It lies at an elevation of 5,209 metres (17,090 ft), to the southeast of Longmu Lake.

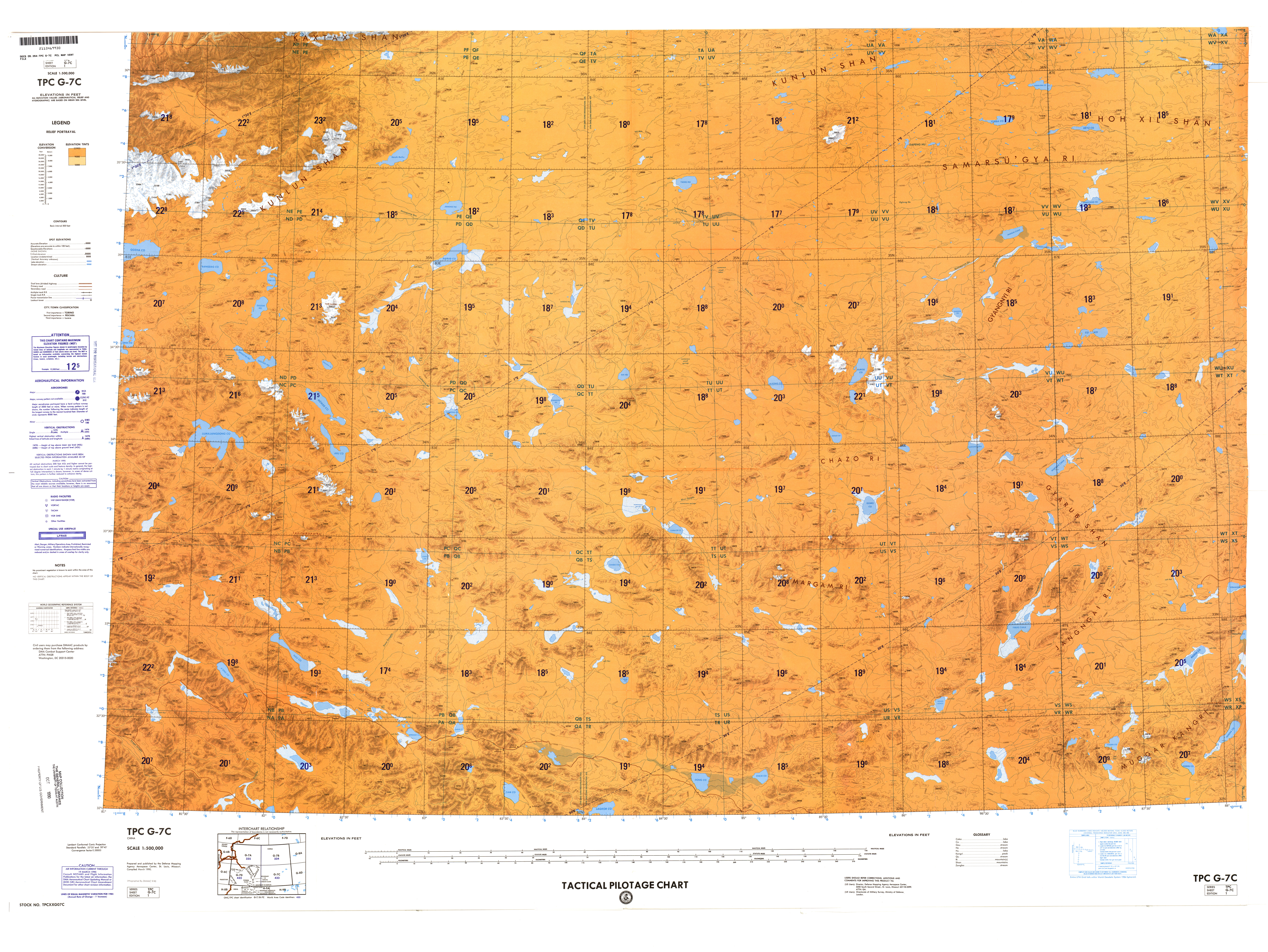
Map including Orba Co
