= Guozha Lake =

Glacial lake in Tibet, China

- Kotra Tso
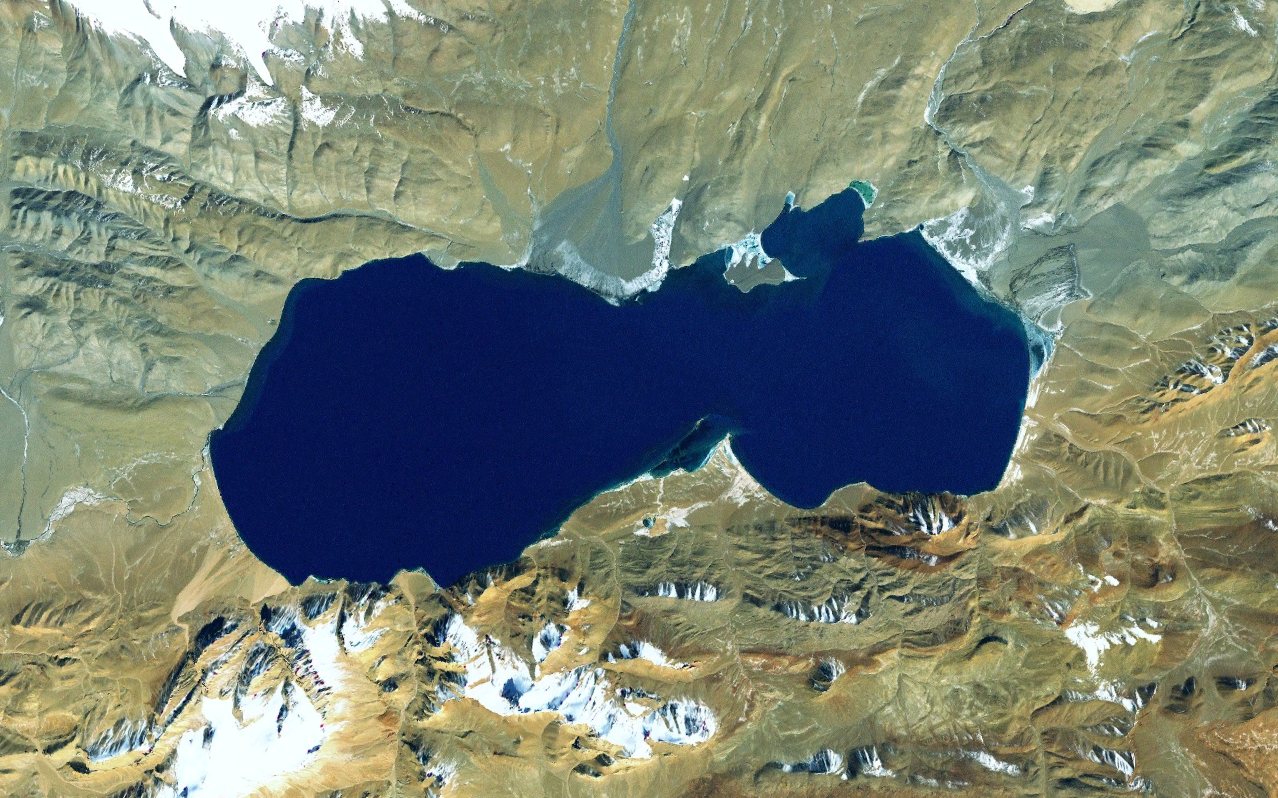
- Guozha Lake viewed from space

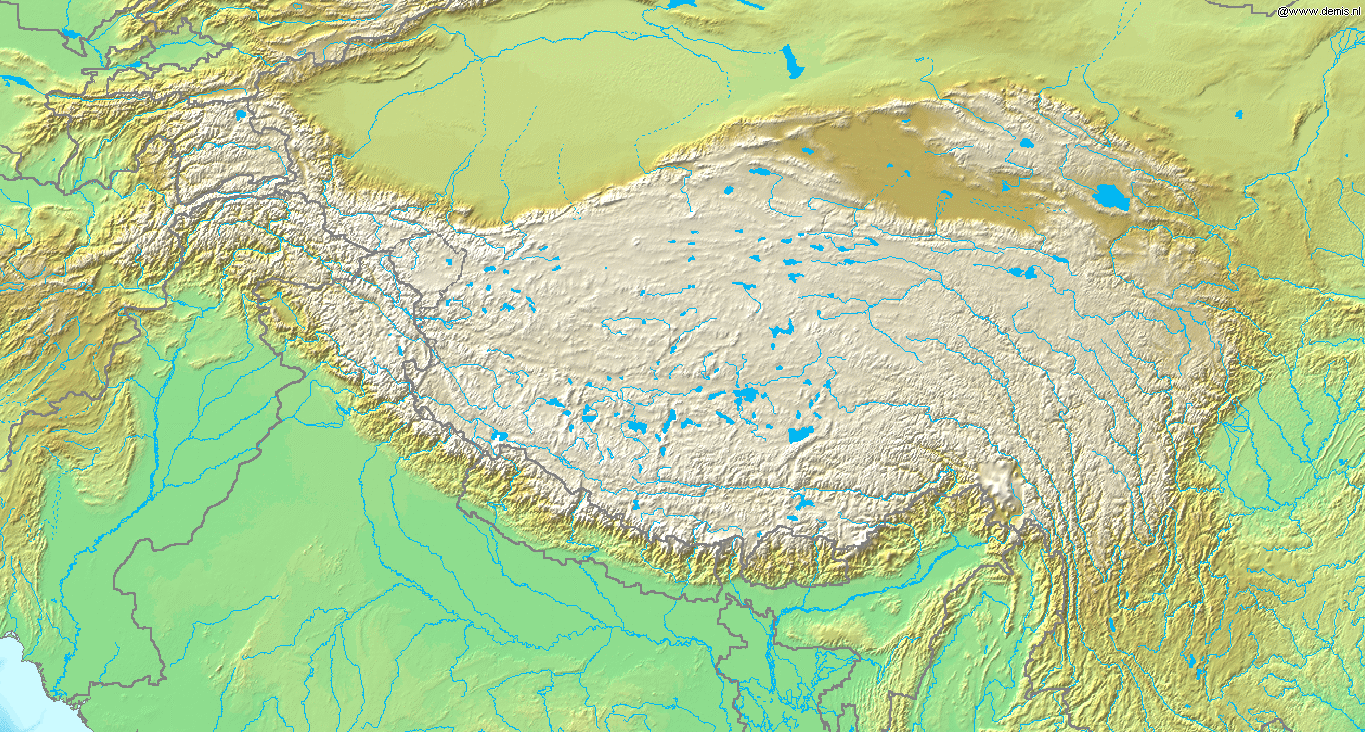
- Location within Tibetan Plateau
- Location: Rutog County, Tibet, China
- Coordinates: 35°1′53″N 81°5′11″E
- Basin countries: China
- Max. length: 30.4 km (19 mi)
- Max. width: 11.6 km (7 mi)
- Surface area: 252.6 km^{2} (100 sq mi)
- Max. depth: 81.9 m (269 ft)
- Shore length^{1}: 104 km (65 mi)
- Surface elevation: 5,080 m (16,667 ft)
- ^{1} Shore length is not a well-defined measure.

Kotra Tso (Tibetan: ཀོ་བཀྲ་མཚ, Wylie: ko bkra mtsha, THL: ko tra tsa), or Guozha Lake (Chinese: 郭扎错; pinyin: Guō zhā cuò), (Note: Alternative spellings include Gozha Co, Gozha Tso or Guozhacuo.) previously called Lake Lighten, (Note: The Indian Government documents spell the name as Lake Leighten.) is a glacial lake in Rutog County in the Ngari Prefecture in the northwest of the Tibet Autonomous Region of China. It lies in the western Kunlun Mountains to the northwest of Bangda Lake, not far from the regional border with Xinjiang. Located at an altitude of 5080 metres, it covers an area of 244 square kilometres with a maximum depth of 81.9 metres and has a drainage basin containing 62 glaciers.

India's claim line in Aksai Chin runs along the water-parting line of Lake Lighten and the Amtogor Lake to the west. However, China has claimed the whole of Aksai Chin in 1959.

== Maps ==
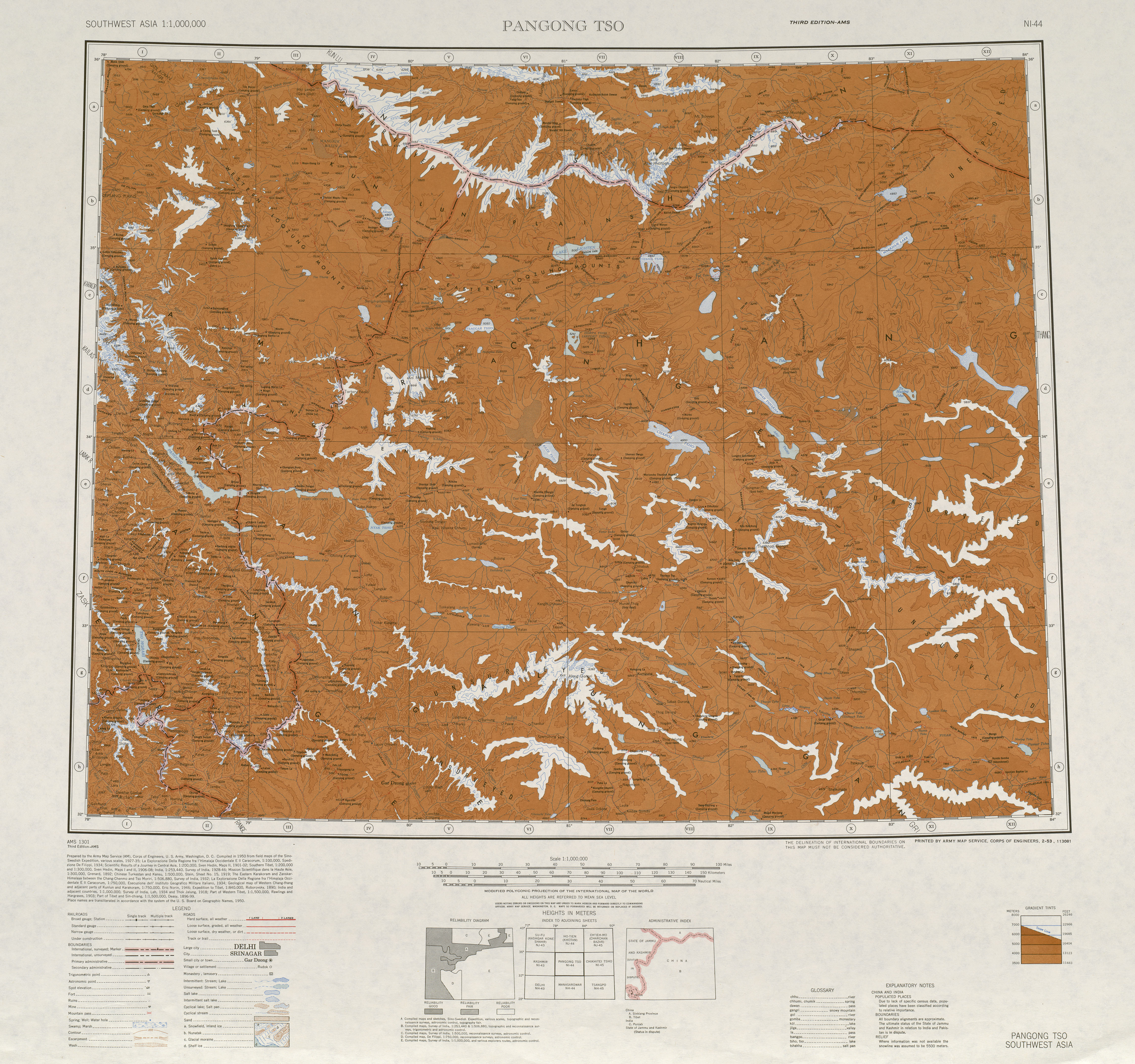
Map including Lake Lighten and surrounding region (AMS, 1950) (Note: From map: "THE DELINEATION OF INTERNATIONAL BOUNDARIES ON THIS MAP MUST NOT BE CONSIDERED AUTHORITATIVE.")

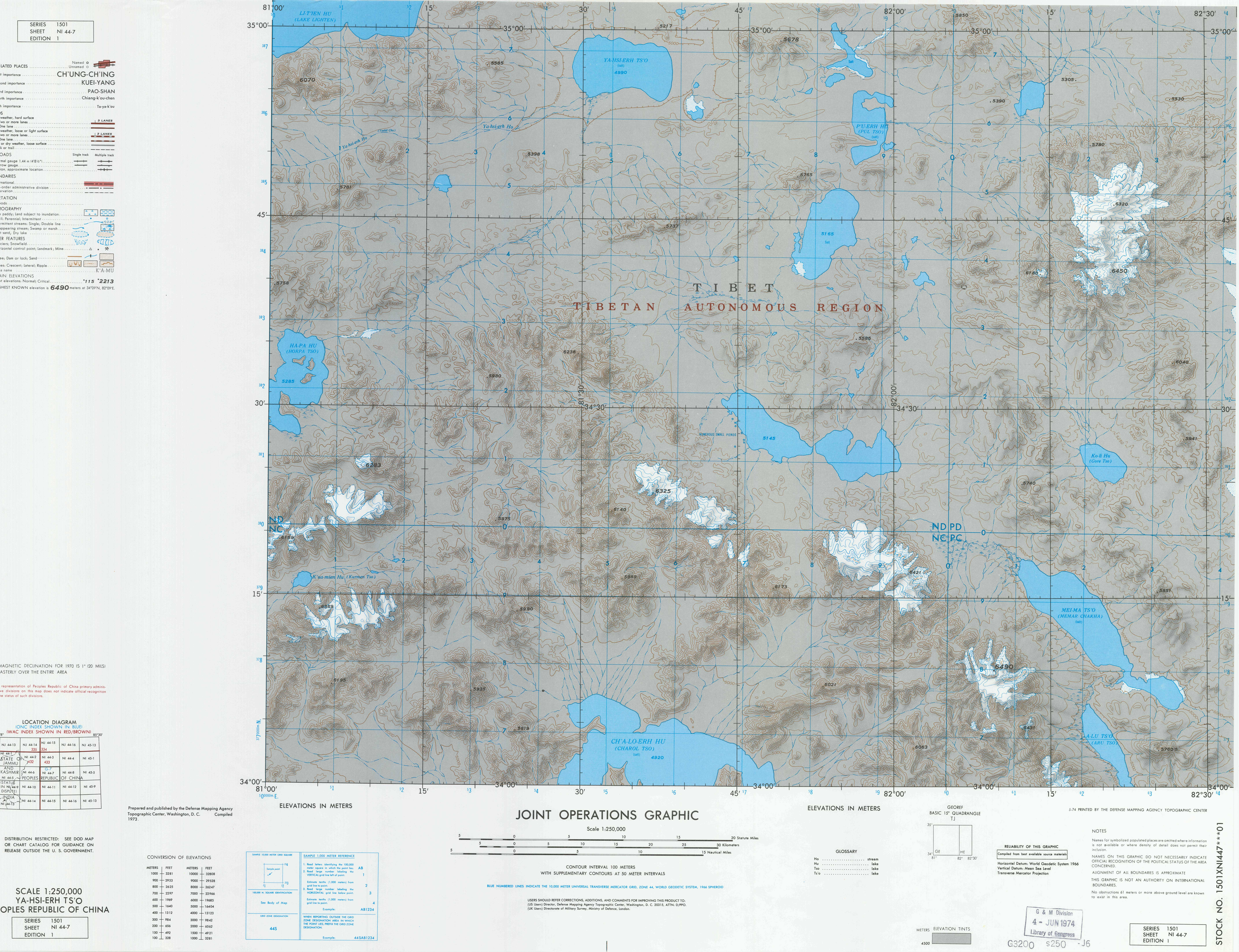
Map including LI-T'IEN HU (Lake Lighten)) (DMA, 1973)
