= Risum Township =

Risum Township རི་གསུམ་ཤང Roksum
- Township
- Risong Township
- Location in Tibet
- Coordinates: 33°11.0′N 79°50.4′E
- Country: People's Republic of China
- Region: Tibet
- Prefecture: Ngari
- County: Rutog
- Elevation: 4,335 m (14,222 ft)
- Time zone: UTC+8 (China Standard)

Risum Township (Tibetan: རི་གསུམ་ཤང, Wylie: ri gsum shang) or Risong Township (simplified Chinese: 日松乡; traditional Chinese: 日松鄉; pinyin: Rìsōng Xiāng), traditionally called Roksum in English, (Note: Alternative spelling: Rokjung (Tibetan: རུ་ཟུང, Wylie: ru zung.)) is a township of Rutog County, in far western Tibet Autonomous Region, People's Republic of China. It is directly serviced by China National Highway 219. The closest airport is the Ali Kunsha Airport.

== Villages ==
Villages incorporated in the township are:

- Deru Village (德汝村) 33°22′15″N 79°41′43″E
- Jiagang Village (甲岗村) 32°52′27″N 79°50′30″E
- Guoba Village (过巴村)33°07′03″N 80°03′23″E
- Risum Village 33°11′50″N 79°49′14″E lies at an altitude of 4,353 metres (14,281 ft). The village has a population of about 14 people. It is located 28 kilometres (17 mi) south of Pangong Tso, a large lake, and 81 km (50 mi) north of the seat of Ngari Prefecture. It lies approximately 22 km (13.9 mi) south of Rutog and 29 km (18.3 mi) north of Jaggang.

== Bibliography ==
- Montgomerie, T. G. (1870), "Narrative Report of the Trans-Himalayan Explorations during 1868", Journal of the Asiatic Society of Bengal, 36 (part 2, issue 1): 47–
