= Jaggang =

Chakgang/Jaggang 甲岗村
- Village
- Jiagang Cun
- Location within Tibet
- Coordinates: 32.882°N 79.792°E
- Country: China
- Region: Tibet
- Prefecture: Ngari Prefecture
- County: Rutog County
- Township: Risong Township
- Elevation: 4,523 m (14,839 ft)

Population (2018)
  - Total: 700+
  - Major Nationalities: Tibetan
  - Regional dialect: Tibetan language

Jaggang
- Chinese: 甲岗村
- Hanyu Pinyin: jiǎ gǎng cūn
- Literal meaning: Jiagang Village
Transcriptions
Standard Mandarin
- Hanyu Pinyin: jiǎ gǎng cūn

Chakgang, (Note: Variations of the traditional spelling include Chagkang, Chagang, and Chakang.) or Jaggang (Tibetan: ལྕགས་སྒང, Wylie: lcags sgang; Chinese: 甲岗; pinyin: Jiǎ gǎng, often transliterated as Jiagang), is a village in the Rutog County, Ngari Prefecture in the Tibet region of China. It is located on a wide plain at a major junction in the Maga Zangbo valley where several tributary streams join the river. It is traditionally known for its barley cultivation. The area was used as a base for Chinese military operations in the Demchok sector in the 1962 Sino-Indian War.

Jiagang Cun (Chinese: 甲岗村; pinyin: Jiǎ gǎng cūn), i.e., "Jaggang Village", includes a wider area in the Maga Zangbo valley with numerous settlements. Between 2014 and 2018, a model village was constructed at the former campsite called Jibajiawu, upstream on Maga Zangbo 15 km west of Chakgang, which was also described as being part of Jiagang Cun. The development received significant publicity. Jiagang Cun is said to have a high proportion of communist party members (106 out of a population of 1000). The 11th Panchen Lama visited the village in July 2019 to examine the living conditions afforded by the new development of the area.

== Geography ==
Jaggang/Jiagang villages

The location of Chakgang is often marked on maps and atlases as being half-way between Rutog and Shiquanhe. The location is virtually identical with that of Churkang in older maps. The location is on a wide plain in the Maga Zangbo valley where a number of routes arrive, from Ladakh via Chang La, from Demchok via Jara La, and from Tashigang and Shiquanhe via Kalinka La. A monthly fair used to be held at this location, visited by traders from Ladakh and Lahul, who would exchange the produce of India for pashm, wool, salt and other products.

The Maga Zangbo (or Tsangpo) river is formed from the streams on the southern slopes of the mountains south of Rutog. It flows in a wide arc, eventually trending north and draining into the Pangong Lake at its eastern end. Churkang and Chakgang are at the location where the river starts flowing north, and several streams from the south and east join it. The land is fertile and barley has been traditionally cultivated in the area.

At present, under Chinese administration, a village has been incorporated under the name "Jiagang Cun", which appears to include several settlements other than Chakgang. At a location called Jibajiawu (or Gie Bajiawu), 15 km west of Chakgang, a model village has been constructed between 2014 and 2018, which is described as part of Jiagang Cun. In the valley to the east of Chakgang, two further villages at Womai Xiong and Queding are also marked as belonging to the Jiagang Cun area. Another settlement called Chiakang (Chinese: 且砍; pinyin: Qiě kǎn) further upstream on Maga Zangbo may also be part of Jiagang Cun.

== Sino-Indian border dispute ==
The Maga Zangbo river valley and Jaggang are adjacent to the Demchok sector disputed between India and China. India claims a border running along the Chang La and Jara La passes whereas China claims a border running west of the Indus Valley. In addition, the Xinjiang–Tibet Road (currently G219) that runs through Indian-claimed Aksai Chin region also runs through Jaggang. For all these reasons, Jaggang is considered a key border village of Chinese-controlled Tibet and it is frequently presented as such in official media.

The village is located about 80 kilometers from the county seat of Rutog Town, and 80 kilometres northeast of the Dumchele border trading point in the Skakjung valley (Indus valley).

A 40 km-long 'class 9 fair weather road' from Churkang to Chang La was built prior to the 1962 Sino-Indian War. The road has now been extended to Dumchele.

== Demographics ==
In 2016, there were 691 people in 185 households in Jaggang village. This increased to 197 households with 723 people in 2018. The per capita income in 2016 was CN¥ 8,060 yuan (US$1228.10).

In 2019 the village had 106 Chinese Communist Party members.

== Economy ==
The village has a collective economy focusing on manufacturing, border trade, development of nurseries and husbandry. The residents are provided with government subsidies for living in the border regions. The village has access to water, electricity and cellular network coverage.

== See also ==
- Risong Township

== Bibliography ==
- Sandhu, P. J. S.; Shankar, Vinay; Dwivedi, G. G. (2015), 1962: A View from the Other Side of the Hill, Vij Books India Pvt Ltd, ISBN 978-93-84464-37-0
