= Longmu Lake =

Lungmu Lake
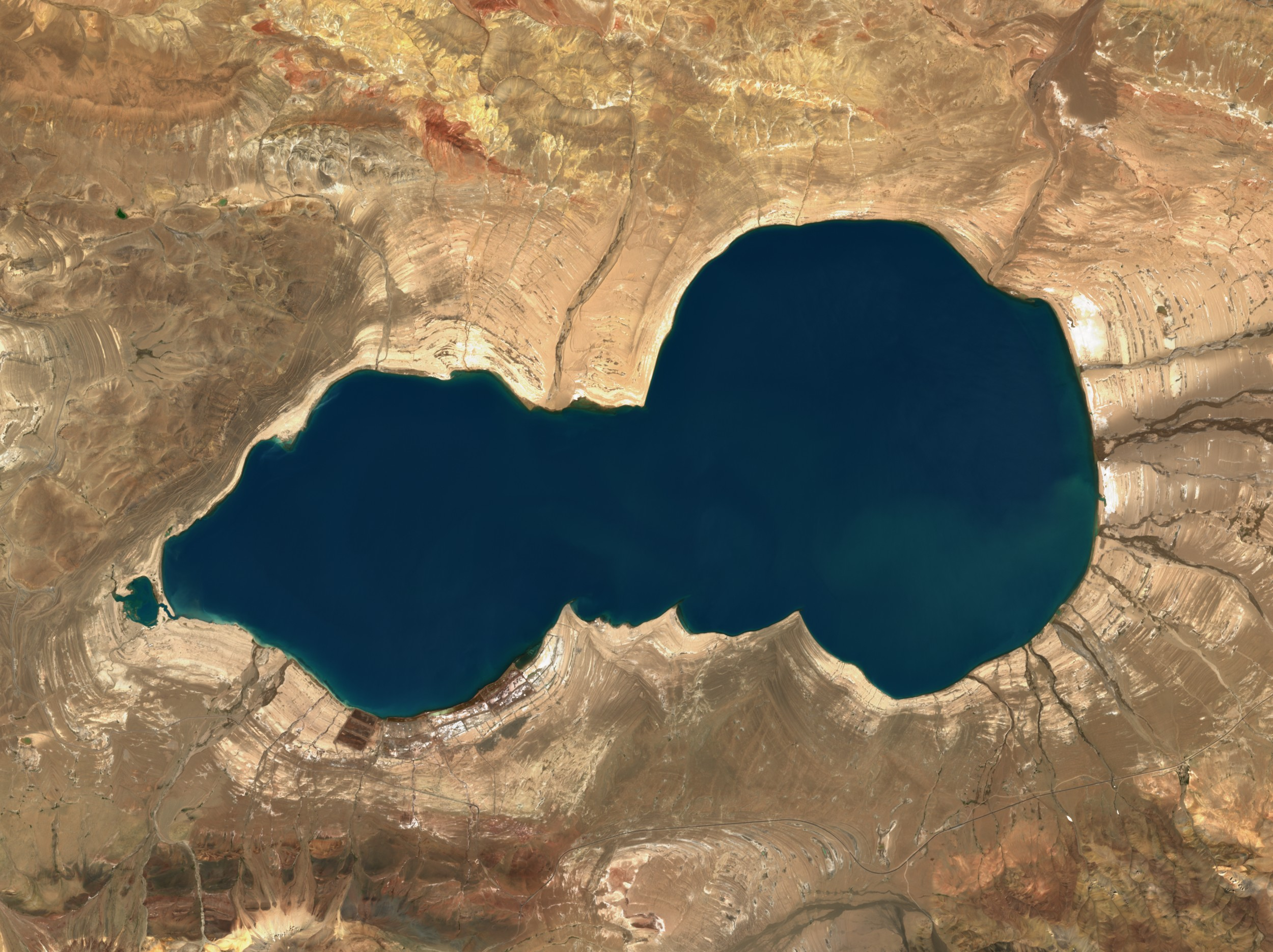
- Sentinel-2 image (2021)

- Location within Ngari
- Location: Rutog County, Ngari Prefecture, Tibet Autonomous Region, China
- Coordinates: 34°36′52″N 80°27′36″E
- Lake type: Salt lake
- Catchment area: 570 km^{2} (200 sq mi)
- Basin countries: China
- Max. length: 17.2 km (11 mi)
- Max. width: 9.1 km (6 mi)
- Surface area: 97 km^{2} (0 sq mi)
- Average depth: 1 m (3 ft)
- Surface elevation: 5,002 m (16,411 ft)

Lungmu (Tibetan: ལུང་མུ་མཚོ, Wylie: lung mu mtsho; Chinese: 龙木错; pinyin: Lóngmù Cuò), also Longmu, Longmu Co or Longmucuo, is a glacial lake in Rutog County in the Ngari Prefecture in the northwest of the Tibet Autonomous Region of China. It was explored in 1989 in a Sino-French expedition to western Tibet.

== Climate ==
Climate data for Longmu Lake
Month	Jan	Feb	Mar	Apr	May	Jun	Jul	Aug	Sep	Oct	Nov	Dec	Year
Mean daily maximum °C (°F)	−12.4 (9.7)	−10.3 (13.5)	−5.5 (22.1)	0.8 (33.4)	5.7 (42.3)	11.6 (52.9)	15.4 (59.7)	14.9 (58.8)	10.4 (50.7)	2.6 (36.7)	−4.3 (24.3)	−9.5 (14.9)	1.6 (34.9)
Daily mean °C (°F)	−19.4 (−2.9)	−16.9 (1.6)	−11.9 (10.6)	−5.9 (21.4)	−1.5 (29.3)	4.1 (39.4)	8.1 (46.6)	7.8 (46.0)	2.8 (37.0)	−5.3 (22.5)	−12.1 (10.2)	−17.0 (1.4)	−5.6 (21.9)
Mean daily minimum °C (°F)	−26.3 (−15.3)	−23.5 (−10.3)	−18.2 (−0.8)	−12.6 (9.3)	−8.6 (16.5)	−3.3 (26.1)	0.9 (33.6)	0.7 (33.3)	−4.7 (23.5)	−13.2 (8.2)	−19.8 (−3.6)	−24.4 (−11.9)	−12.7 (9.1)
Average precipitation mm (inches)	1 (0.0)	1 (0.0)	1 (0.0)	2 (0.1)	4 (0.2)	4 (0.2)	11 (0.4)	16 (0.6)	3 (0.1)	1 (0.0)	1 (0.0)	2 (0.1)	47 (1.7)
Source: Climate-Data.org

== Map gallery ==
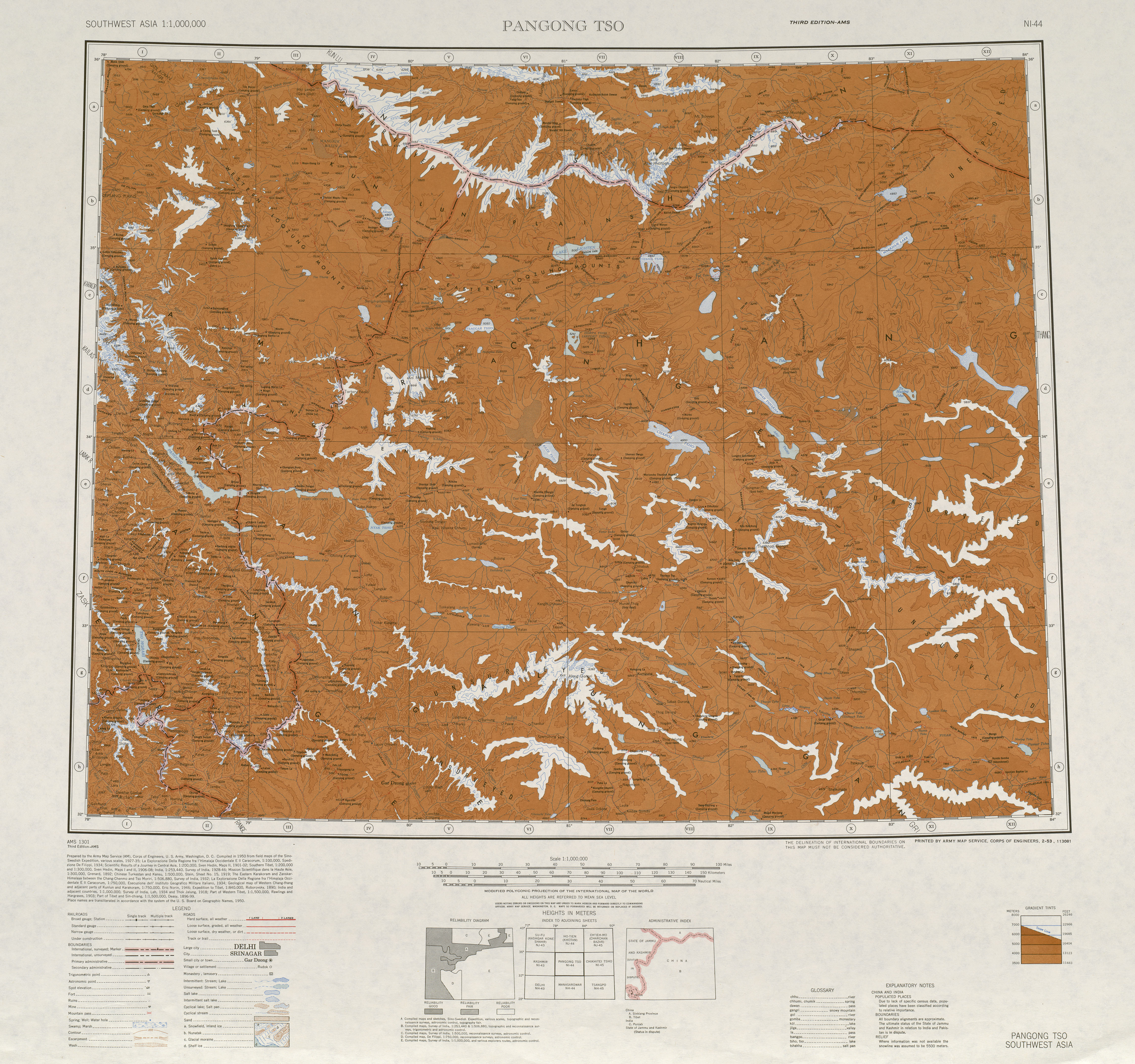
Map including Longmu Lake (labeled as TSAGGAR TSHO) and surrounding region (AMS, 1950) (Note: From map: "THE DELINEATION OF INTERNATIONAL BOUNDARIES ON THIS MAP MUST NOT BE CONSIDERED AUTHORITATIVE.")
