= International Studies (journal) =

- Discipline: International Relations, Political Science, South Asian Politics
- Language: English
- Edited by: Gulshan Sachdeva

Publication details
- History: April 1959
- Publisher: SAGE Publications
- Frequency: Triannual

Standard abbreviations
- ISO 4: Int. Stud.

Indexing
- ISSN: 0020-8817 (print); 0973-0702 (web)

Links
- Journal homepage; Online access; Online archive

International Studies publishes original research articles on a wide range of issues and problems, as well as on the theoretical debates of contemporary relevance in the broader field of International Relations and Area Studies. Published in association with Jawaharlal Nehru University, New Delhi. This journal is a member of the Committee on Publication Ethics (COPE). The journal was established in 1959.
