= Rudok =

Village in Rutog County, Ngari, Tibet

Rudok རུ་ཐོག་དགོན Rutok, Rutog
- Village
- 日土村
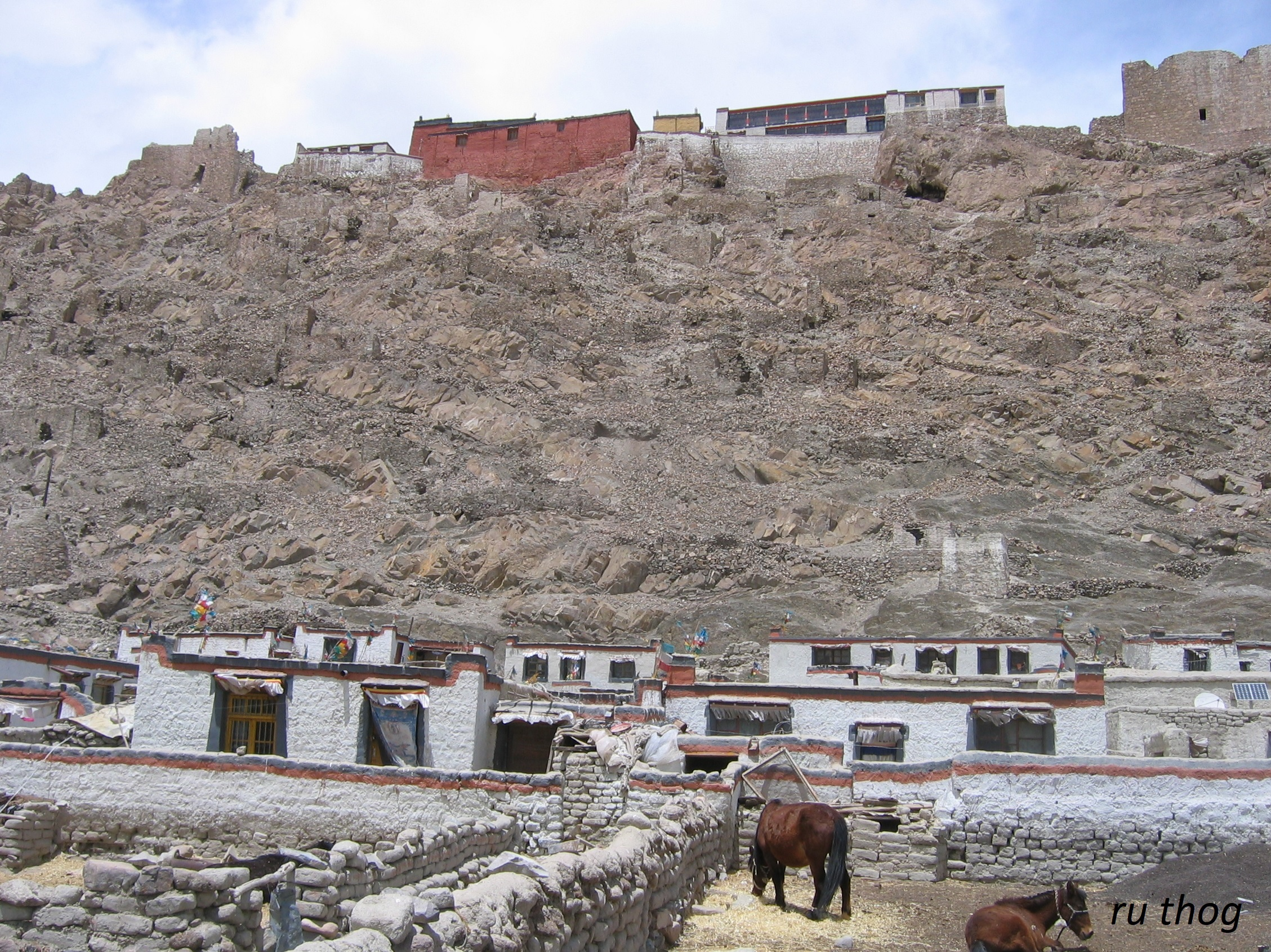
- Rudok village and dzong (The hillside is dotted with the ruins of numerous buildings destroyed during the cultural revolution)

- Location within Tibet Location within China
- Coordinates: 33.4161°N 79.6433°E
- Country: China
- Province: Tibet Autonomous Region
- Prefecture: Ngari Prefecture
- County: Rutog County
- Township: Rutog Town
- Established: c. 1000
- Elevation: 4,250 m (13,940 ft)
- Area code: +86 (0) 897

Rudok, also spelt Rutok and Rutog, (Note: The standard British spelling of the town is "Rudok". Encyclopedia Britannica states that the modern spelling is "Rutog". Tourist guides often spell it as "Rutok". Other spellings include Ruduk, Ruthog, and Rodakh.) (Note: Luciano Petech transliterates the name as Ru-t'og, while Zahiruddin Ahmad writes Ru-thogs.) is a town that served as the historical capital of the Rudok area in Western Tibet on the frontier with Ladakh. In the 1911 Encyclopædia Britannica, it is described as being "picturesquely situated" on the side of a hill standing isolated in the plain near the east end of Lake Pangong.

After the collapse of the Tibetan Empire, control of Rudok alternated between Guge and Maryul (Ladakh). Rudok was separated from Ladakh after the Tibet–Ladakh–Mughal War in 1684 and annexed to Central Tibet. During the Qing dynasty, Rudok was the location of a Chinese outpost. Close economic relations between Ladakh and Rudok nevertheless continued until the Chinese annexation of Tibet in 1949. China discontinued trade between Ladakh and Rudok, opening an alternative route via Demchok instead, and developed Rudok into a military base.

Around the year 2000, the Chinese administration of Tibet built a new Rutog Town about 10 km east of Rudok, adjacent to the China National Highway 219, and moved the county headquarters there. The original town is now regarded as a "village" (Chinese: 日土村; pinyin: Rì tǔ cūn) within the township of the new town. The original town also took considerable damage during the Cultural Revolution and lost much of its grandeur. It is still recommended as a tourist destination by a number of guide books.

== Geography ==
Rutog Dzong (日土村) and Rutog Town (日土县)

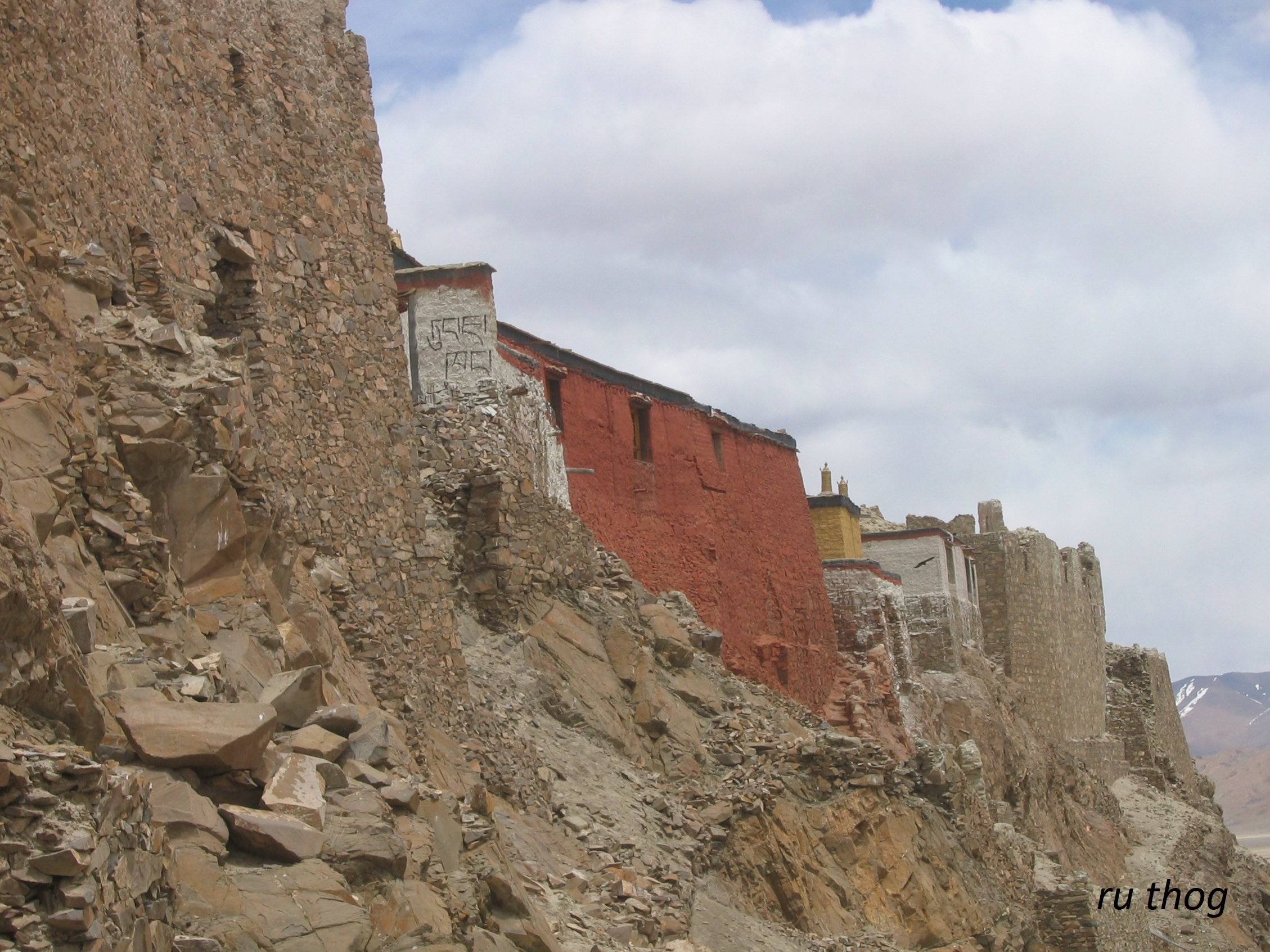
Rudok monastery

Rudok is centred on a small hill on the bank of a tributary called Chuling Chu of the Maga Tsangpo river. Chuling Chu joins the latter about 4 km downstream and the combined river flows into the southeastern end of the Pangong Lake further 4 km down. Maga Tsangpo is one of the largest affluents of the Pangong Lake.

E. B. Wakefield, the first European to visit Rudok in 1929, described the purple and black hill, rising high above the level of the surrounding plain, crowned by the Dzongpön's palace, which seemed "beautiful and impressive and worthy of [its] sanctity". The village was built around the hill, at its base as well as on the hill slopes. The houses were built in tiers, whitewashed and walled in.

According to the 1911 Encyclopedia Britannica, at the top of the hill were a large palace (dzong) and several monasteries painted in red. Modern travel literature names them as Sharje, Lhakhang, Marpo, and Nubradan monasteries. According to another travel book, the monasteries were destroyed during the Chinese Cultural Revolution. One of them (Lhakhang) was rebuilt in 1983–84. It had only six monks in 1999.

An early monastery called "Lhundrub" was located here, belonging to the New Tantra Tradition School of Rinchen Zangpo. It appears to have been adapted by the Gelugpa school at a later time. It is currently referred to as Lhundrub Chode monastery.

=== Climate ===
Rudok is over 4,000 m. above sea-level. The winter climate of Rudok and of all the towns of the Tsangpo basin, owing to the intense dryness of the air and the light fall of snow, seems to be bracing and exhilarating rather than severe.

== History ==
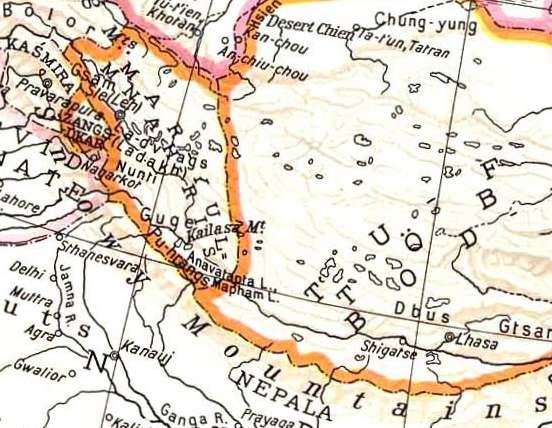
Maryul in 1100–1200 CE (said to have included Guge)

In the vicinity of Rudok are ancient petroglyphs which resemble those of Gilgit and Ladakh. They were chiselled using stone tools, and depict animals, human figures and Bön symbols. They are believed to have been carved prior to the 7th century when Ladakh as well as Rudok were part of the Zhangzhung empire based in the Langqên Zangbo valley.

After the Zhangzhung empire was conquered by the Yarlung dynasty of Central Tibet, both Ladakh and Rudok came under Tibetan control. Roughly two hundreds later (around 900 CE), the Tibetan Empire fragmented with the assassination of the emperor Langdarma. One of Langdarma's descendants, Kyide Nyimagon, founded a new empire in Western Tibet (Ngari Khorsum). After his death, the kingdom was divided among his three sons. Ladakh and Rutog were among the inheritance of Lhachen Palgyigon, the eldest son, who established the kingdom of Maryul in modern day Ladakh. The second son received Guge and Purang. One late source states that Rudok was included in Guge rather than Maryul, which might indicate that it did not stay long with the descendants of Palgyigon and fell into Guge's orbit. António de Andrade, Jesuit missionary to Guge, established a mission in Rudok in 1627. Some years later, it was driven out.

According to the 1911 Encyclopædia Britannica, a Chinese outpost had existed at Rudok for many years. A visitor to Rudok in 1906 described the place as "a picturesque village on a rocky eminence, but largely in ruins".

=== Chinese control ===
Rudok with respect to Sino-Indian border

In 1950, as the People's Republic of China sent forces to Lhasa in order to annex Tibet, it also sent a small force from Khotan in Xinjiang to western Tibet, taking its people by surprise. According to Indian intelligence, the force travelled via the Keriya Pass to Gar Gunsa (Gartok) via a tedious route and arrived there in June 1951. Chinese accounts seem to corroborate this information. In October, the Chinese started to explore the possibility of opening a road route to Xinjiang via Rudok (through Keriya La). In late 1952, the 2nd Cavalry Regiment based at Gartok garrisoned Rudok with 150 men and 800 camels. The Indian trade agent stationed at Gartok was denied permission to visit trade marts at Rudok. By 1953, the Chinese had a motorable jeep track between Xinjiang and Rudok.

During the negotiations for the 1954 trade agreement with India, the Chinese declined to allow trade between Ladakh and Rudok, bringing to an end a centuries-old trading relationship. Indian negotiators believed it was due to the presence of military installations in the area. An alternative route to Tashigang via Demchok was agreed and incorporated in the agreement.

During the 1962 war, China stationed a battalion of forces at Rudok (Ritu Dzong), a battalion at the Indus crossing, and a cavalry regiment at Jiagang for operations in the Demchok sector (Parigas/Balijiasi). Jiagang also functioned as the command headquarters. Starting around 26/27 October, the forces attacked the Indian border posts at the Demchok village, and Jara La and Chang La passes, and forced them to withdraw to the west of the Indus river. The Demchok sector has since been divided between the two countries.

== Maps ==
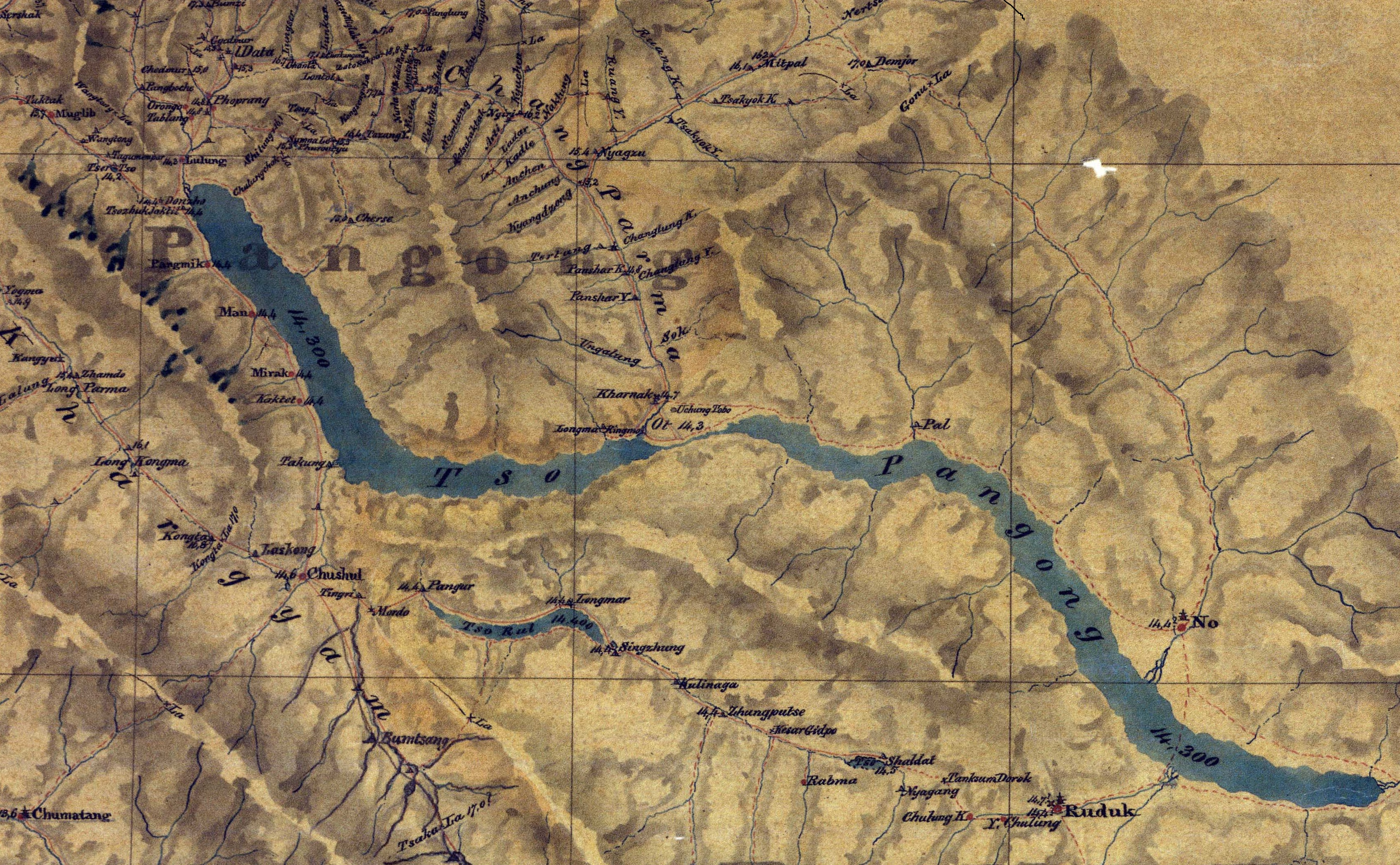
Map of the Pangong lake region with Rudok at the southeast (Strachey, 1851)

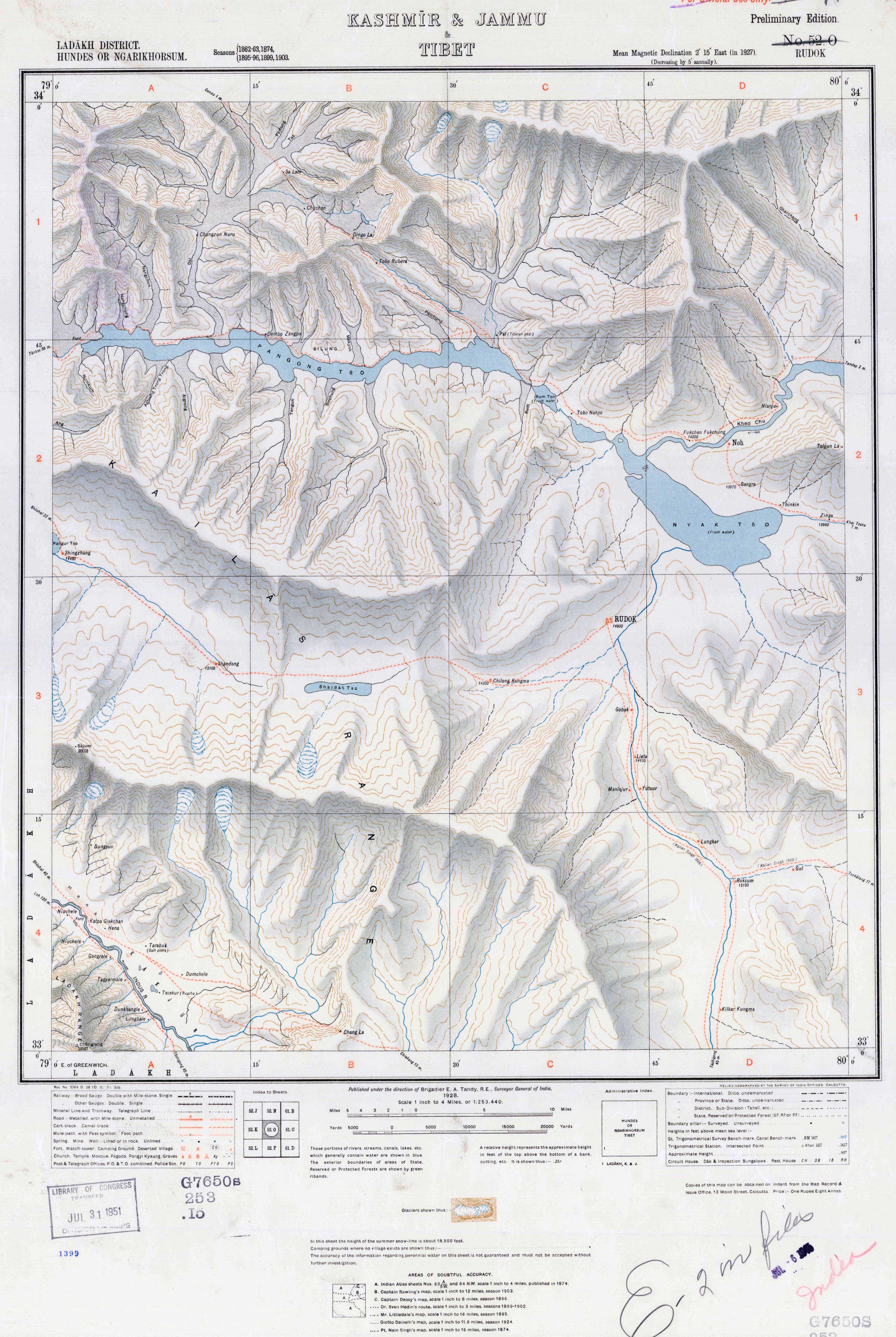
Map of the Pangong lake region with Rudok at the southeast (Survey of India, 1928)

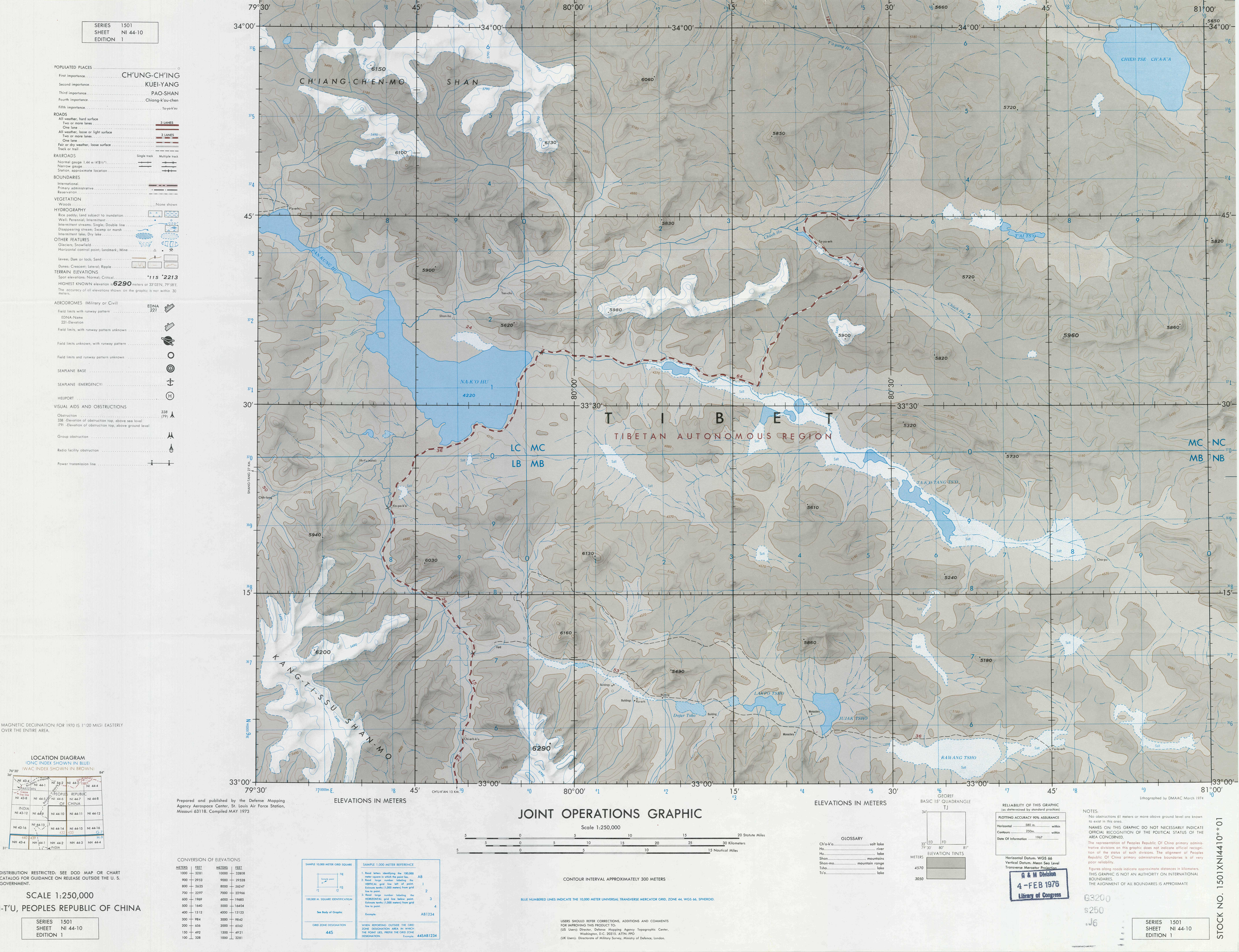
Map including Rudok, labeled as Ko-pa-k'o (DMA, 1973)

== Bibliography ==
Historical and scholarly sources

- Ahmad, Zahiruddin (1963), "Tibet and Ladakh: A History", Far Eastern Affairs, St. Antony's Papers, vol. 14, Chatto & Windus, pp. 23–
- Bhasin, Avtar Singh (2021), Nehru, Tibet and China, Penguin Random House, ISBN 9780670094134
- Cunningham, Alexander (1854), Ladak: Physical, Statistical, Historical, London: Wm. H. Allen and Co – via archive.org
- Fisher, Margaret W.; Rose, Leo E.; Huttenback, Robert A. (1963), Himalayan Battleground: Sino-Indian Rivalry in Ladakh, Praeger – via archive.org
- Handa, O. C. (2001), Buddhist Western Himalaya: A Politico-Religious History, Indus Publishing Company, ISBN 978-81-7387-124-5
- Howard, Neil; Howard, Kath (2014), "Historic Ruins in the Gya Valley, Eastern Ladakh, and a Consideration of Their Relationship to the History of Ladakh and Maryul", in Lo Bue, Erberto; Bray, John (eds.), Art and Architecture in Ladakh: Cross-cultural Transmissions in the Himalayas and Karakoram, pp. 68–99, ISBN 9789004271807
- Mullik, B. N. (1971), My Years with Nehru: The Chinese Betrayal, Allied Publishers – via archive.org
- Petech, Luciano (1977), The Kingdom of Ladakh, c. 950–1842 A.D. (PDF), Instituto Italiano Per il Medio ed Estremo Oriente – via academia.edu
- Sandhu, P. J. S.; Shankar, Vinay; Dwivedi, G. G. (2015), 1962: A View from the Other Side of the Hill, Vij Books India Pvt Ltd, ISBN 978-93-84464-37-0
- Sherring, Charles A. (1906), Western Tibet and the British Borderland, T. G. Longstaff, Edward Arnold – via archive.org
- Wakefield, E. B. (1961), "A Journey to Western Tibet, 1929" (PDF), The Alpine Journal: 118–133

Travel literature

- Chan, Victor (1994), Tibet Handbook, Chico, CA: Moon Publications, ISBN 9780918373908 – via archive.org
- Mayhew, Bradley; Bellezza, John Vincent; Wheeler, Tony; Taylor, Chris (1999), Tibet, Lonely Planet, ISBN 9780864426376 – via archive.org

Official reports

- Palat, Madhavan K., ed. (2016) [1962], "Report of the Officials of the Governments of India and the People's Republic of China on the Boundary Question", Selected Works of Jawaharlal Nehru, Second Series, Volume 66, Jawaharlal Nehru Memorial Fund/Oxford University Press, ISBN 978-01-994670-1-3 – via archive.org
