= Rutog County =

Rutog County 日土县 • རུ་ཐོག་རྫོང་། Rudok, Ritu
- County
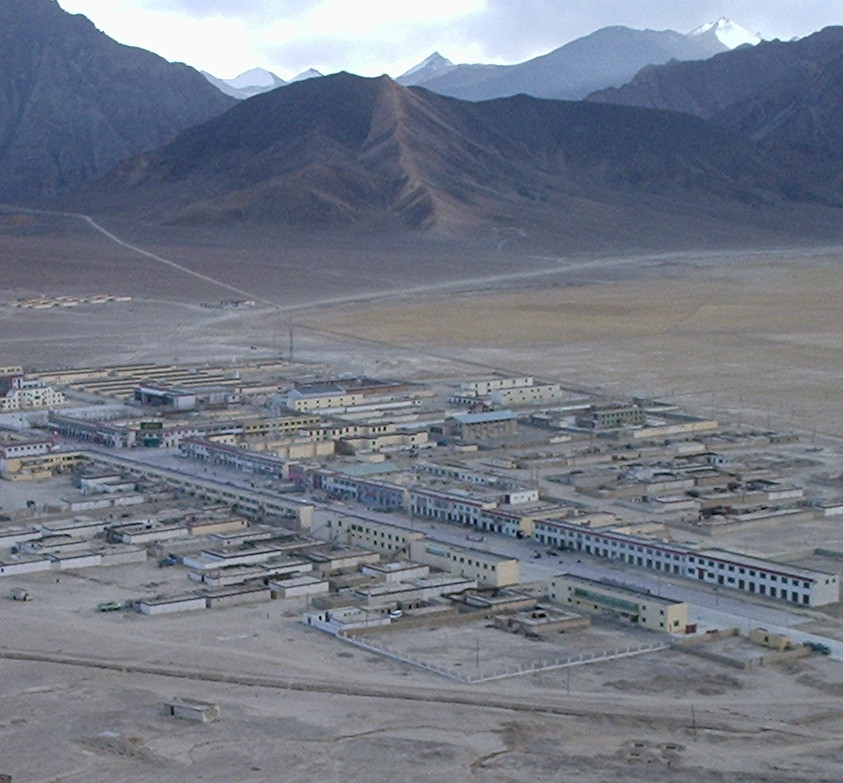
- Rutog Town

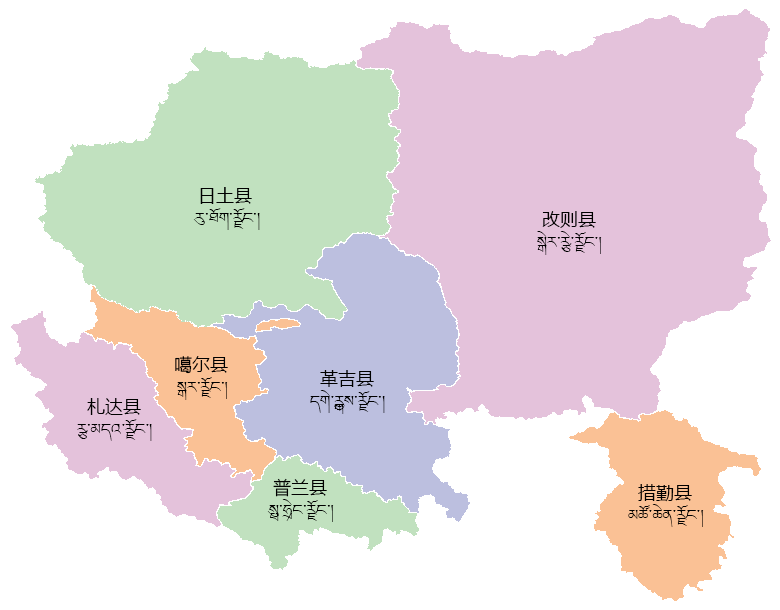
- Map showing Rutog County (green, upper left) in Ngari Prefecture

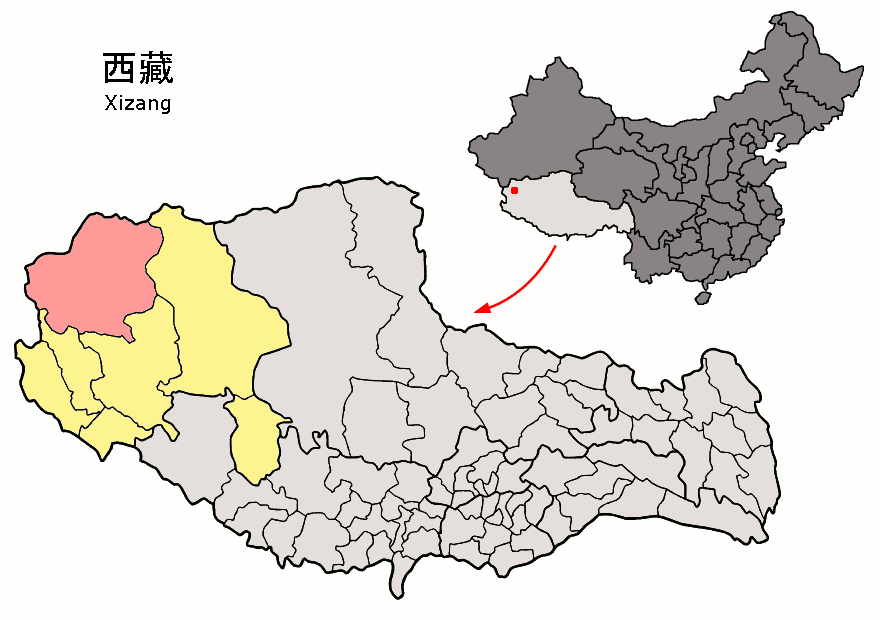
- Location of Rutog County (red) within Ngari Prefecture (yellow) and the Tibet Autonomous Region

- Location of the seat in the Tibet AR Rutog (Tibet) Rutog (China)
- Coordinates (Rutog County government): 33°22′48″N 79°43′55″E
- Country: China
- Autonomous region: Tibet
- Prefecture: Ngari
- County seat: Rutog

Area
  - Total: 81,046 km^{2} (31,292 sq mi)

Population (2020)
  - Total: 11,167
  - Density: 0.13779/km^{2} (0.35686/sq mi)

Ethnic groups
  - Major ethnic groups: Tibetan
- Time zone: UTC+8 (China Standard)
- Postal code: 859700
- Website: rt.al.gov.cn (in Chinese)

Rutog County

Chinese name
- Simplified Chinese: 日土县
- Traditional Chinese: 日土縣
Transcriptions
Standard Mandarin
- Hanyu Pinyin: Rìtǔ Xiàn

Tibetan name
- Tibetan: རུ་ཐོག་རྫོང་།
Transcriptions
- Wylie: ru thog rdzong
- Tibetan Pinyin: Rutog Zong

Rutog County (Tibetan: རུ་ཐོག་རྫོང་།, Chinese: 日土县) is a county in Ngari Prefecture, Tibet Autonomous Region, China. The county seat is the new Rutog Town, located some 1,140 km (710 mi) or 700 miles west-northwest of the Tibetan capital, Lhasa. Rutog County shares a border with India, which is disputed.

The county has a rich history of folk tales, myths, legends, proverbs and folk songs and has many caves, rock paintings and other relics. The Xinjiang-Tibet Highway runs through the Rutog County for 340 km (210 mi). The modern county established in March 1961 covers 74,500 km^{2} (28,800 sq mi). It has a very low population density with a population of just over 10,000.

== Name ==
'Rutog' is Tibetan for "mountain shaped like a spear and fork".

== Geography and climate ==
Rutog County is located in northwestern Tibet, in the Ngari Prefecture, with a number of territorial borders. It is divided into 12 townships and 30 village committees. The average altitude of the county is 4,500 m (14,800 ft) with a maximum altitude of 6,800 m (22,300 ft).

To the north, Rutog County shares borders with Hotan County (Hetian), Qira County (Cele) and Keriya County (Yutian) in Hotan Prefecture (Hetian), Xinjiang. To the east, the county borders Gêrzê County. The disputed Aksai Chin plateau, which China administers as part of the Hotan County is to the northwest of Rutog County. To the west lies Ladakh, a union territory of India, with which Rutog has had a long historical relationship.

Lakes in Rutog County include Bangda Lake, Guozha Lake, Longmu Lake, Lumajangdong Co and Wo Erba Lake. The eastern part of the Pangong Lake lies in the Rutog County, while the western part is in Ladakh.

Rutog County has a rough subarctic climate with long, very cold, sometimes snowy winters and short, cool, humid summers (Dfc) owing its extreme altitude.

== History ==
Rutog was part of the Maryul kingdom (modern Ladakh), when it was established in the 10th century. It was again consolidated as part of Ladakh during the reign of Sengge Namgyal, but was later conquered by Lhasa through the Tibet-Ladakh-Mughal War. Rutog and Ladakh continued to have extensive trading relations at all times, with occasional disputes over borders.

The headquarters of the region was at Old Rudok (Rutog Dzong; 33.4175°N 79.6427°E), a hill top location, which boasted a fort as well as several monasteries. During the period of the British Raj in India, European visitors were expressly prohibited from visiting the Rudok, but the British official E. B. Wakefield managed to visit it in 1939.

With the 1950 Chinese annexation of Tibet, Rutog became part of the Tibet Autonomous Region of China. In October 1983, the county seat was moved from Old Rudok to the village of Derub (Chinese: 德汝昆孜; pinyin: Dé rǔ kūn zī; 33.3718°N 79.6961°E). The present Rutog Town was built sometime around 1999 a short distance away from Derub. The site of the new town appears to have been originally a suburb of the Derub village called Gyelgosang (Tibetan: རྒྱལ་སྒོ་བསངས, Wylie: rgyal sgo bsangs, THL: gyel go sang; 33.3837°N 79.7318°E).

== Administrative divisions ==
Rutog county is divided into 1 town and 4 townships:

Name	Chinese	Hanyu Pinyin	Tibetan	Wylie
Town
Rutog Town	日土镇	Rìtǔ zhèn	རུ་ཐོག་གྲོང་རྡལ།	ri thog grong rdal
Townships
Rabang Township	热帮乡	Rèbāng xiāng	ར་སྤང་ཤང་།	ra spang shang
Risum Township	日松乡	Rìsōng xiāng	རི་གསུམ་ཤང་།	ri gsum shang
Dungru Township (Tungru)	东汝乡	Dōngrǔ xiāng	དུང་རུ་ཤང་།	dung ru shang
Domar Township	多玛乡	Duōmǎ xiāng	རྡོ་དམར་ཤང་།	rdo dmar shang

== Demographics and economy ==
Historical population
Year	Pop.	±% p.a.
2000	7,175	—
2010	9,738	+3.10%

As of 1996, the residents of the county were Tibetan, there is also a Ladakhi minority.

Rutog County's economy is based around farming and animal husbandry. Aside from wool, butter, hides, cattle cashmere, etc. are produced. In Rutog County, the main growing crop is barley and yaks, sheep, goats, horses and other livestock are important to the economy. Rutog County has many wild animals and plants, including the black-necked crane, goose, wild yak, Tibetan antelope, Mongolian gazelle, black sheep, kiang, and bear. A number of rare animals are protected by the government and are of high value. Known mineral resources are gold, lead, chromite, borax, and salt.

In the five years from 2006 to 2011, Rutog County produced 72 tons of cashmere wool worth 16 million yuan (US$2.5 million in 2011). China produces 75% of the world's cashmere wool.

In 1984, the average per capita income of Rutog County residents was 478 yuan.

The China National Highway 219 passes through Rutog County.

== Incidents ==
At around 11 AM on 17 July 2016, nine people, 350 sheep and 110 yaks were buried in an avalanche near the Aru Lake (at 34°02′45.4″N 82°17′24.6″E), about 250 kilometres (160 mi) from Rutog Town. The avalanche fell on a grazing area and the snow was as much as 8 m (26 ft) deep. The local government dispatched rescuers and equipment to the site of the avalanche. The avalanche was described by NASA as one of the largest avalanches in history. On 21 September 2016, another similarly large avalanche occurred just to the south.

== Historical maps ==
Historical maps including Rutog:

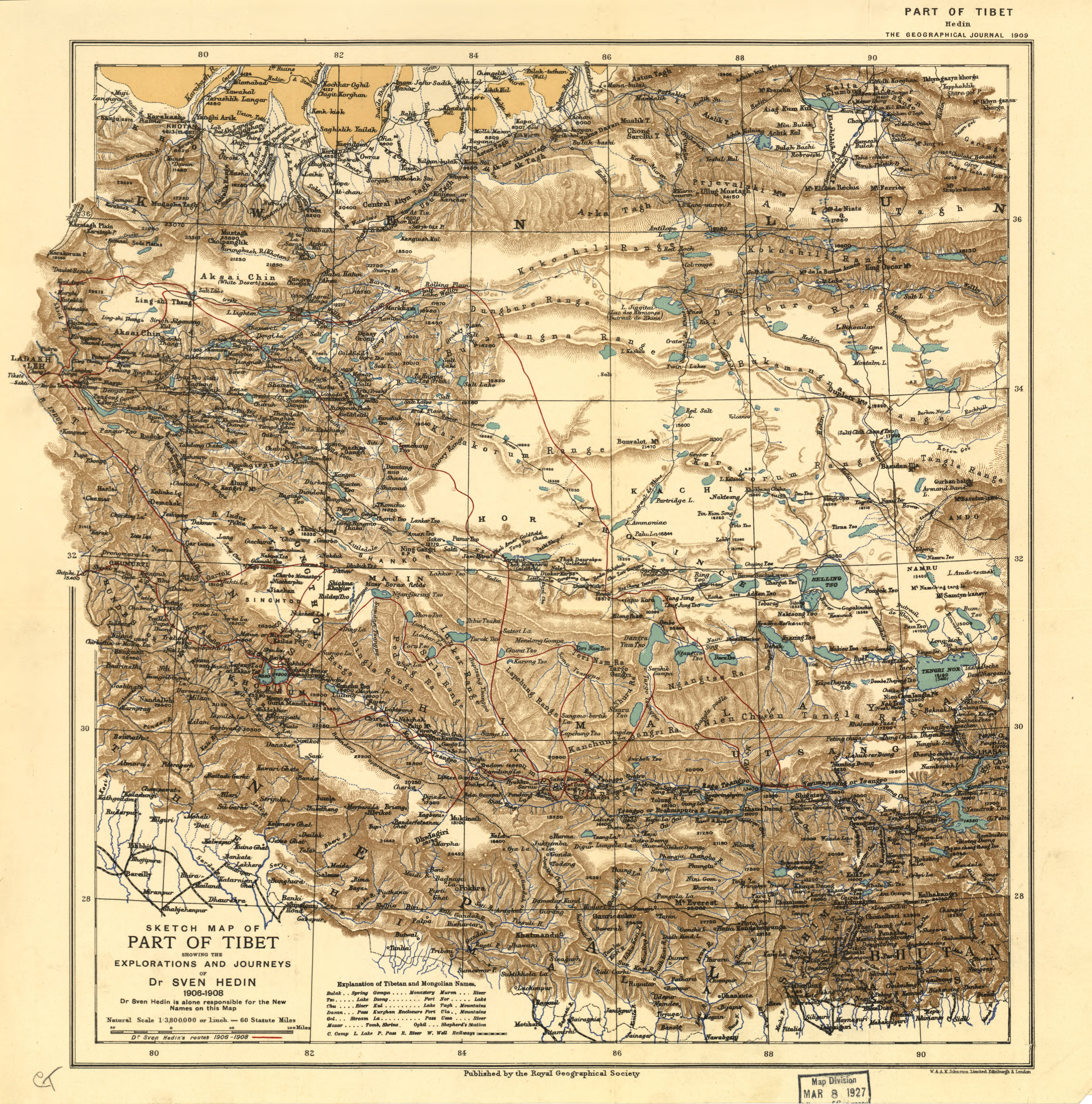
Map of the expeditions of Sven Hedin (1906–8) including Rutog (labeled as Rudok) (RGS, early 20th century)

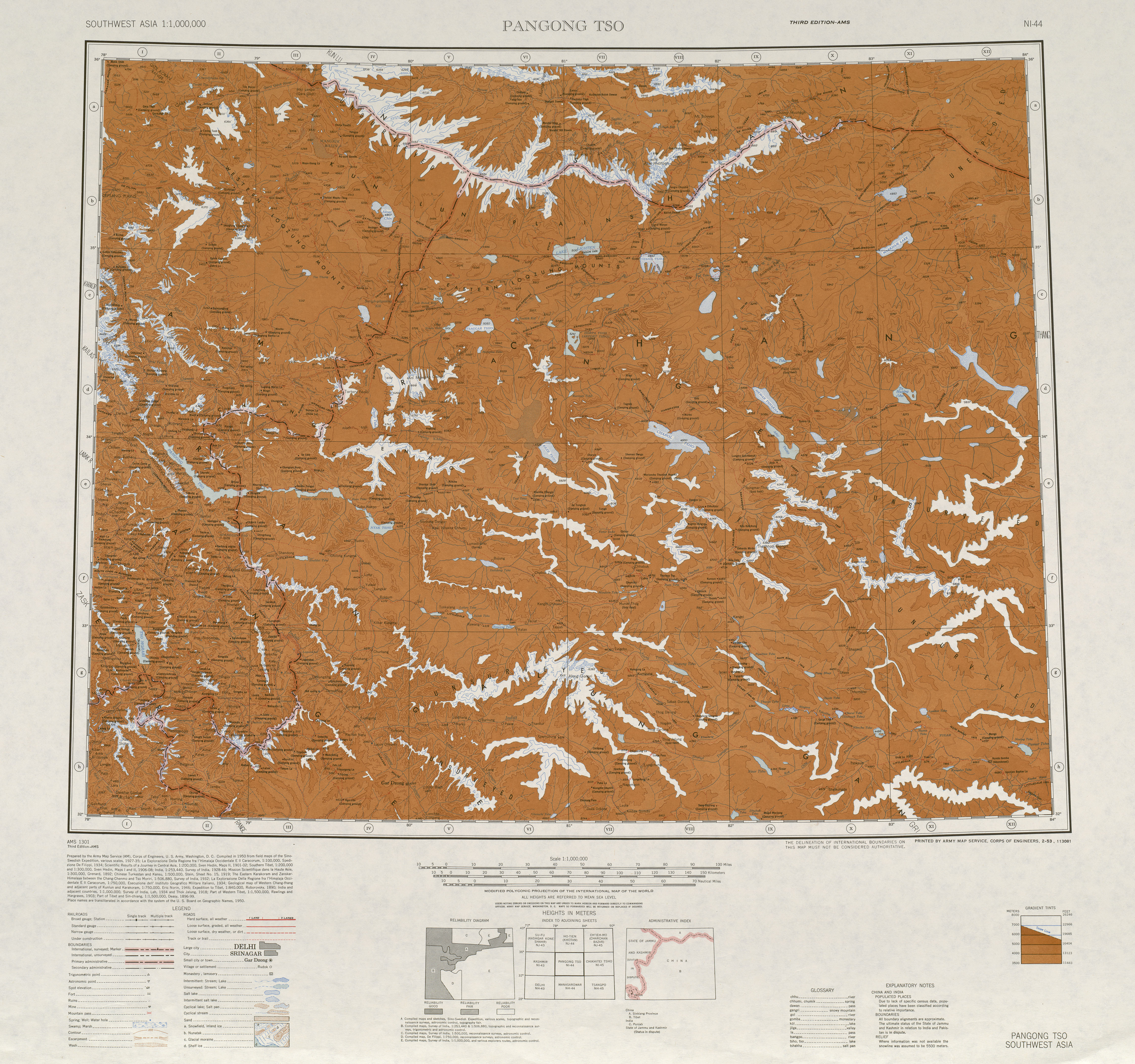
Map including Rutog (labeled as Rudok) (AMS, 1950) (Note: From map: "THE DELINEATION OF INTERNATIONAL BOUNDARIES ON THIS MAP MUST NOT BE CONSIDERED AUTHORITATIVE.")

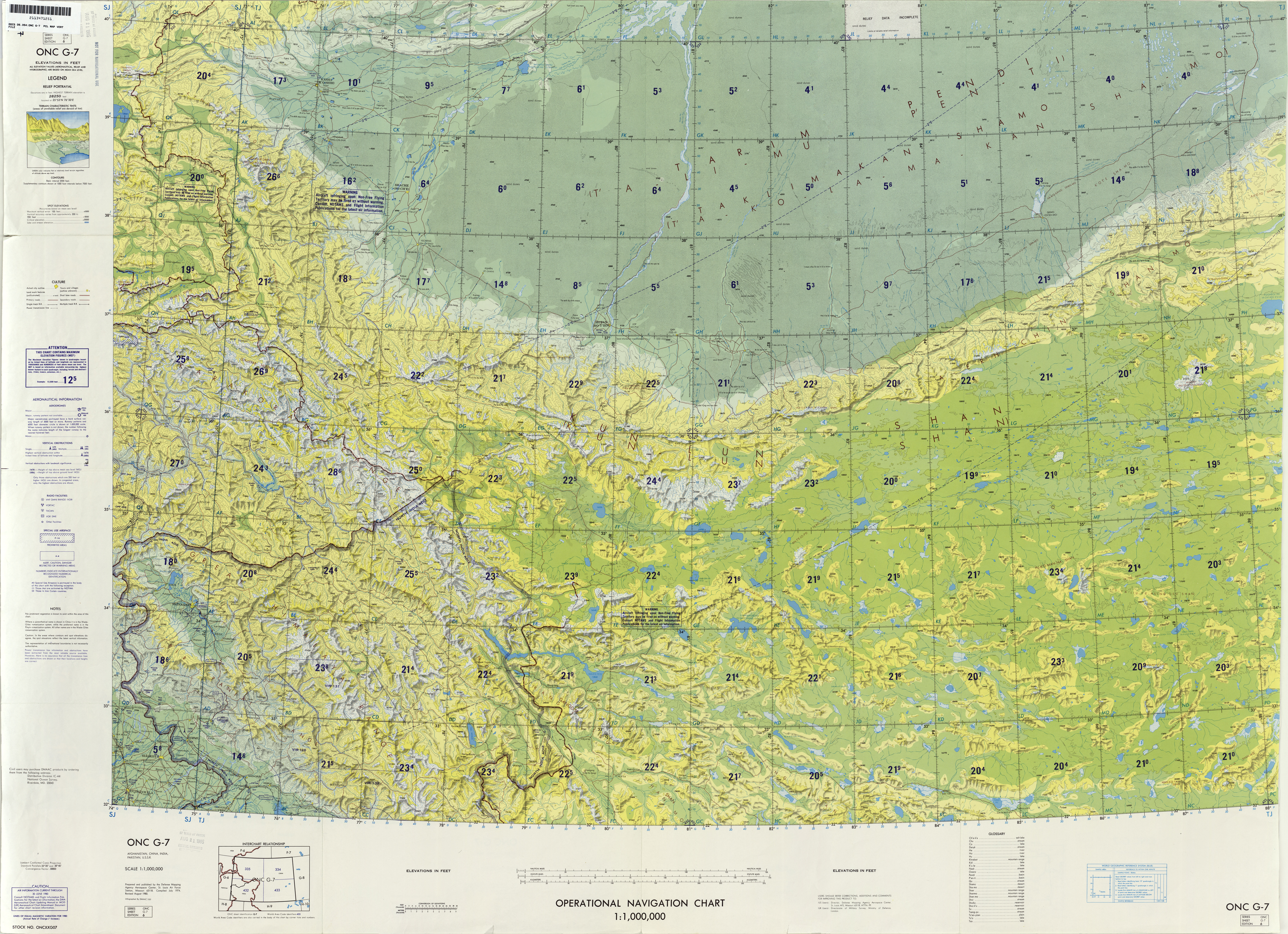
Map including the Rutog County area (DMA, 1980)

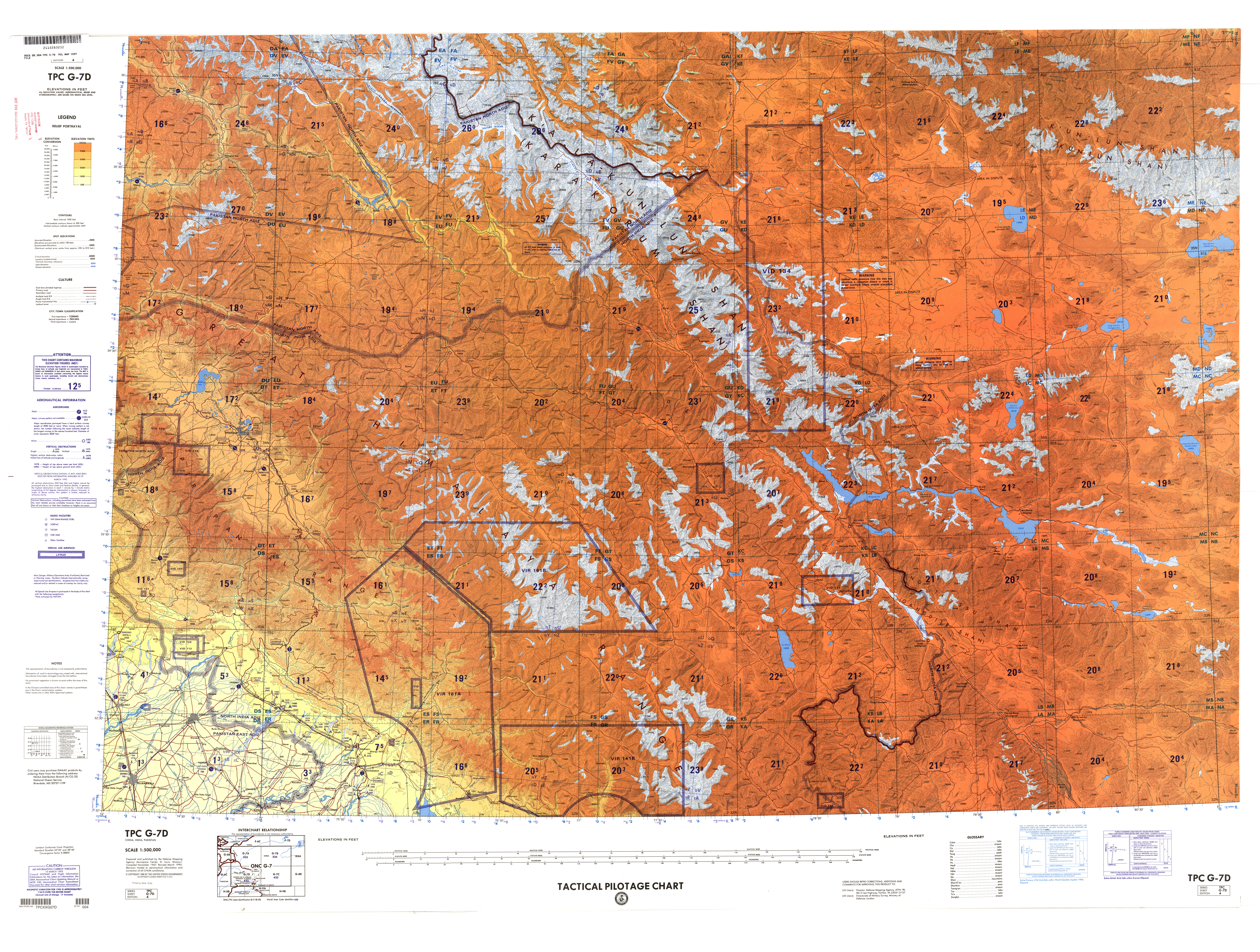
Map including Rutog (Jih-t'u) (DMA, 1995)

== See also ==
- Aksai Chin
- 2020 China–India skirmishes
