= Rutog Town =

Town in the Tibet Autonomous Region

Rutog Town / Rituzhen རུ་ཐོང་གྲོང་རྡལ / 日土镇 Derub, Gyelgosang
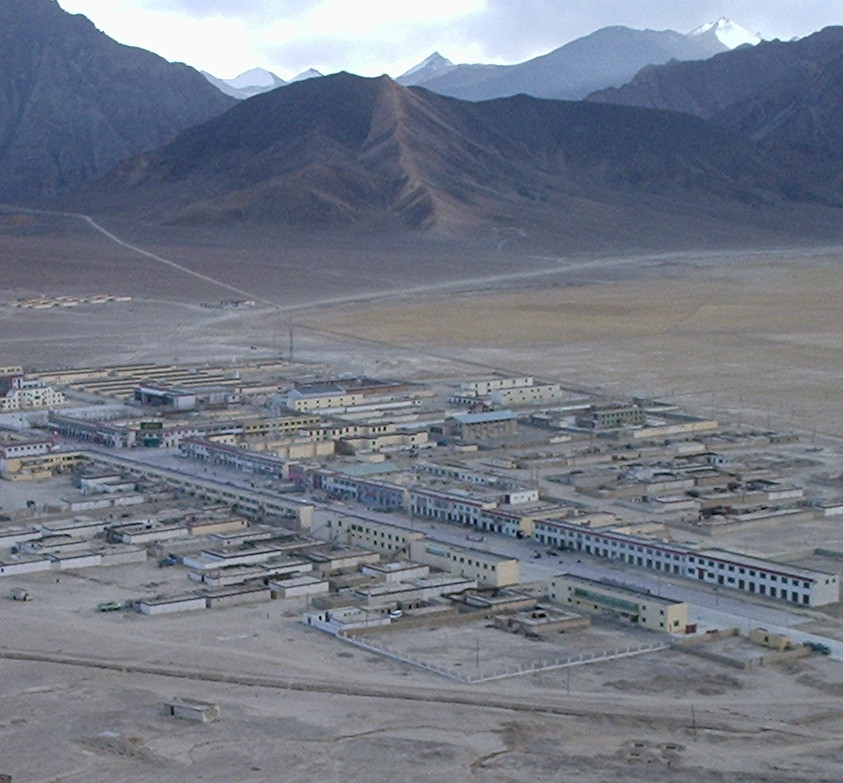
- Interactive map of Rutog Town / Rituzhen
- Location within Tibet
- Coordinates: 33°23′6″N 79°43′48″E
- Country: People's Republic of China
- Province: Tibet Autonomous Region
- Prefecture: Ngari Prefecture
- County: Rutog County
- Elevation: 4,280 m (14,040 ft)

Population
  - Total: 1,000
- Time zone: UTC+8 (CST)

The Rutog Town (Tibetan: རུ་ཐོང་གྲོང་རྡལ, ZWPY: Rutog Chongdai), called Rituzhen in Chinese (Chinese: 日土镇 ; pinyin: Rìtǔ zhèn), is a town and the seat of Rutog County in the far western Tibet Autonomous Region.

The town was built around in 1999 on the China National Highway 219. Prior to that, the seat of the county was at Rudok, about 10 km northwest.

The new Rutog Town is located 120 kilometres by road northwest of Shiquanhe (also called Ali or Ngari) and 10 kilometres south of Lake Pangong. The town has a population of about 1000 people.

== Town and garrison ==
The location contains a small Gyelgosang community (Tibetan: རྒྱལ་སྒོ་བསངས, Wylie: rgyal sgo bsangs, THL: gyel go sang, ZWPY: Gyaigosang; Chinese: 杰果桑社区; pinyin: Jié guǒ sāng shèqū) of the Derub village (33.3718°N 79.6961°E). (Note: Alternative spellings: Derup and Deru (Tibetan: སྡེ་རུབ, Wylie: sde rub; Chinese: 德汝; pinyin: Dé rǔ cūn). The village also bears the name Kugtang (Tibetan: ཁུག་ཐང, Wylie: khug thang; Chinese: 库让; pinyin: Kù ràng).) Lacking a river of its own, it is watered by a canal dug from the Maga Tsangpo river at Derub.

Tibetologist Gyurme Dorje states that the newly built town is basically a Chinese military garrison, as does the Lonely Planet guide. Indian sources describe it as a major military base for China near the disputed border with India allowing it to press its claims militarily. According to Indian writer Brahma Chellaney, the town serves as a base for China's military operations against India along the disputed Sino-Indian border in Ladakh and what he called the "salami tactics".

Normally able to accommodate 5,000 troops, the camp's capacity was expanded to house 15,000 to 18,000 troops by 2021. Satellite imagery indicated that China broke ground in August 2019, and started extending the facilities in the waterless valley to the northeast of the town. New garrison facilities, radar stations, surface-to-air missile sites, heliports and tank drills have been constructed.

== Township ==
The extended township of Rutog contains the Old Rudok town and the valley of Shaldat and Spanggur lakes towards the Ladakh border. It is bounded in the north by the Pangong lake and in the south by the Maga Tsangpo basin. The valley contains villages such as Chulung 'Ogma (33.3795°N 79.5308°E), Recho (or Retso; 33.4087°N 79.1977°E) and Shingzhang (33.4973°N 79.0387°E) at the southeastern end of Spanggur Lake.

== Transportation ==
The China National Highway 219 (G219) connects Rutog to Shiquanhe, the capital of the Ngari Prefecture, Gar Günsa, the home of Ngari Gunsa Airport, and other venues to the southeast. In the north, the highway passes through the disputed Aksai Chin region and goes to Kashgar. The Lonely Planet guide mentioned in 1999 that the visitors coming from Kashgar were required to have a permit to enter Rutog.

At Derub, a road called Musi Xian branches off from G219 towards the Spanggur Lake near the Indian border. Yeban Xian branches off from Musi Xian near Shaldat Lake and heads to the Indus Valley and, via Demchok, into the Tsamda County. At the northeastern end of the Pangong Lake, another offshoot of G219 called Banying Xian heads to the Chinese military base at Kongka La.

In addition, China has recently started constructing a bridge over the Pangong Lake near the Khurnak Plain. This is intended to link up Musi Xian and Banying Xian, so that China can move troops and resources speedily across the two sides of the Pangong Lake.

== See also ==
- List of towns and villages in Tibet

== Bibliography ==
- Dorje, Gyurme (2004), Footprint Tibet Handbook with Bhutan (3rd ed.), Bath: Footprint Handbooks, ISBN 1-903471-30-3 – via archive.org
- Mayhew, Bradley; Bellezza, John Vincent; Wheeler, Tony; Taylor, Chris (1999), Tibet, Lonely Planet, ISBN 9780864426376 – via archive.org
