= Gartok =

Gartok Gar Yarsa
- Location within Tibet
- Coordinates: 31.7280°N 80.3371°E
- Country: People's Republic of China
- Province: Tibet Autonomous Region
- Prefecture: Ngari Prefecture
- County: Gar County
- Elevation: 4,450 m (14,600 ft)
- Time zone: UTC+8 (CST)

Gartok (Tibetan: སྒར་ཐོག, Wylie: sGar-thog) (Note: Variants of the spelling include Gartog, Gardokh, Gartokh, Ghertope, while Garo appears to be an alternative form of the name.) is made of twin encampment settlements of Gar Günsa and Gar Yarsa (Tibetan: སྒར་དབྱར་ས, Wylie: sGar-dbyar-sa, Wade–Giles: Ka-erh-ya-sha) in the Gar County in the Ngari Prefecture of Tibet. Gar Gunsa served as the winter encampment and Gar Yarsa as the summer encampment. But in British nomenclature, the name Gartok was applied only to Gar Yarsa and the practice continues to date.

Gartok was established as Lhasa's administrative headquarters for Western Tibet (Ngari) after it conquered it from Ladakh in 1684. A senior official called Garpön was stationed here. Gartok (Gar Yarsa) also served as Western Tibet's principal trade-market. But the village itself was small and is said to have been quite poor. After the Chinese annexation of Tibet, the headquarters of Western Tibet was moved to Shiquanhe.

Gar Yarsa is situated on the bank of the Gartang River, one of the headwaters of the Indus River, at the base of the Kailash Range, at an elevation of 4,460 metres (14,630 ft).

== Name ==
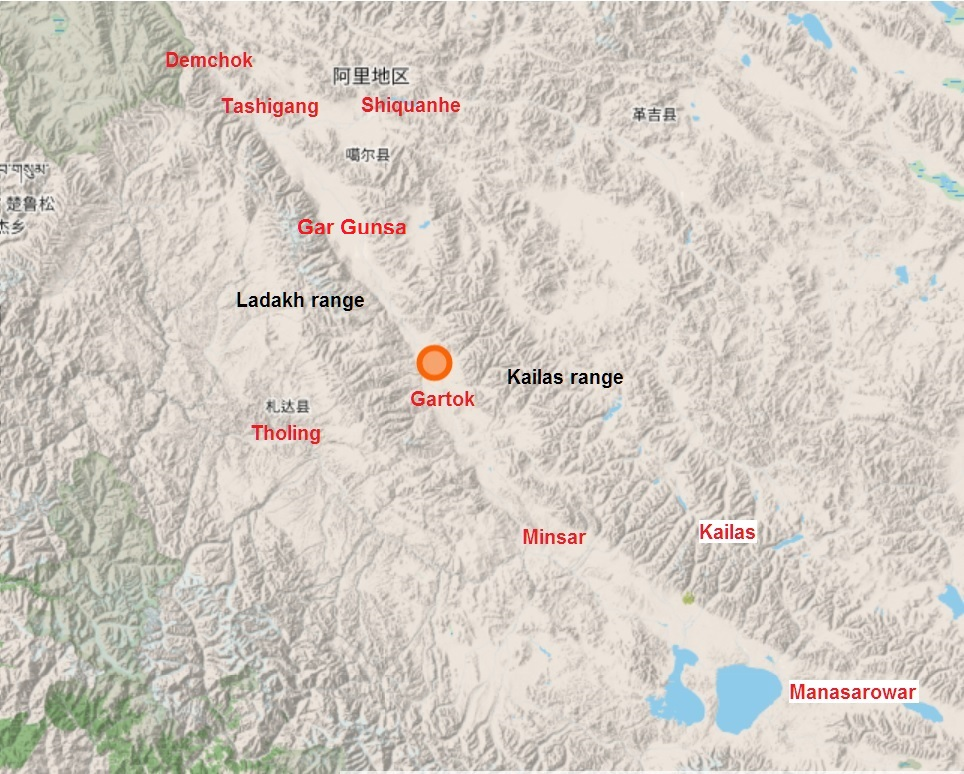
Gartok and vicinity

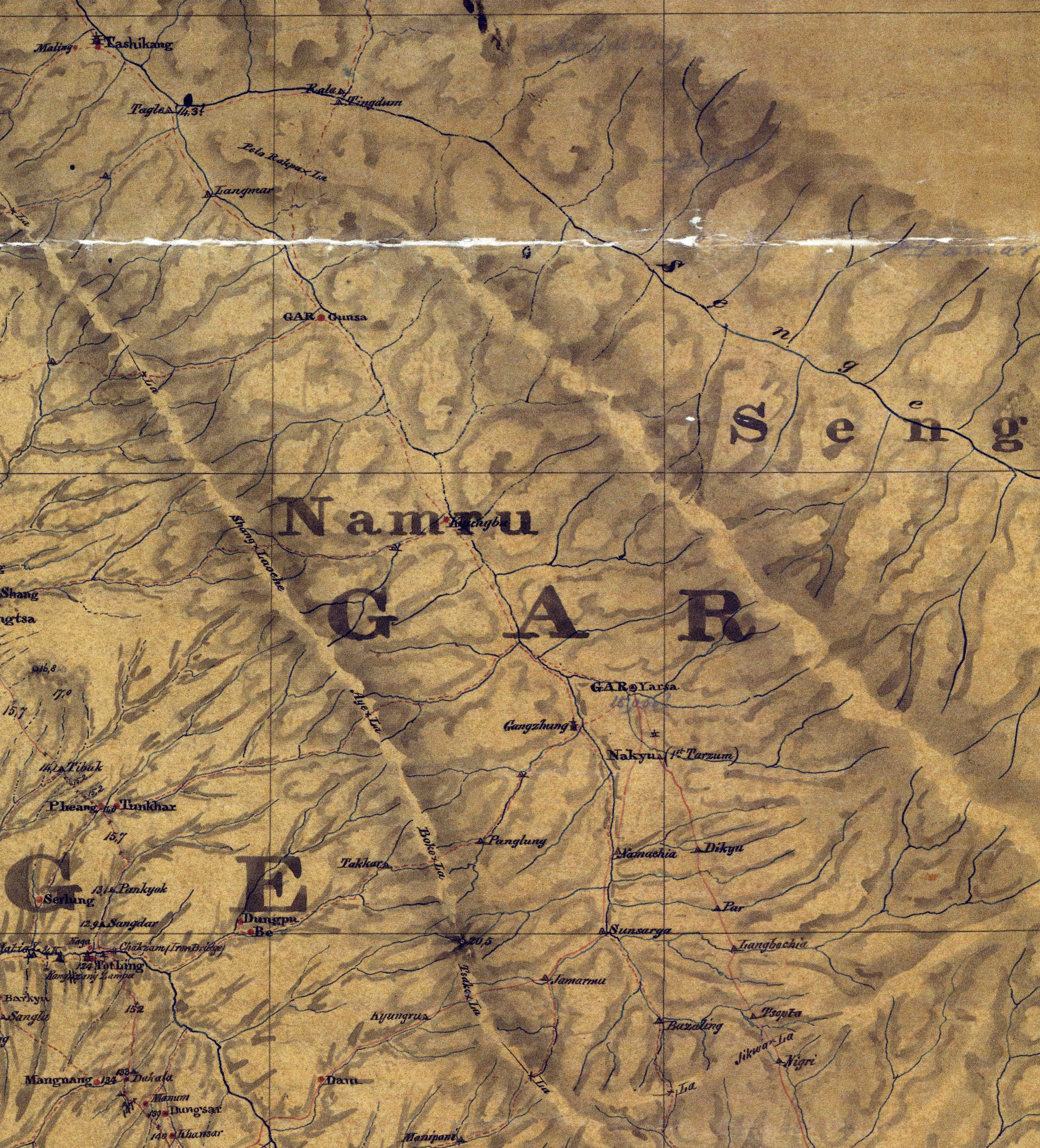
Map of the Gar valley by Strachey (1851) showing Gar Gunsa and Gar Yarsa. The Gartang river joins Senge Zangbu at a location called Tagle, with Langmar and Rala nearby.

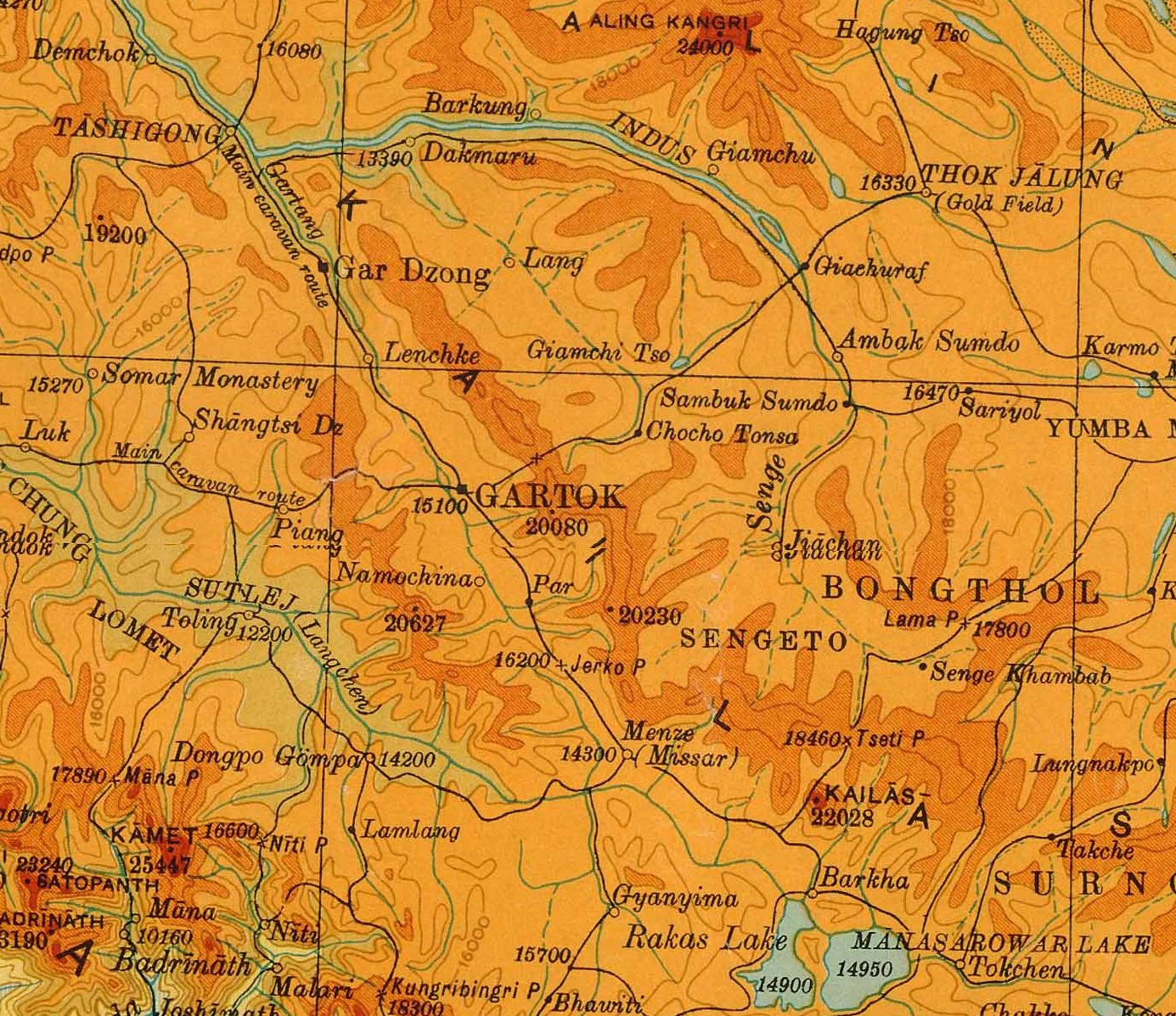
Map of the Gar valley in a Survey of India map (1936), showing Gartok (Gar Yarsa) and Gar Dzong (Gar Gunsa)

Gar (Wylie: sGar) means "encampment". During the 15th and 16th centuries, the Karma Kagyu lamas moved through the length and breadth of Tibet in "Great Encampments" or garchen. The term is also often used for military camps.

British sources interpreted "Gar Yarsa" as the "summer camp". However, the ninth century bilingual text Mahāvyutpatti translated yarsa as Sanskrit वार्षिकावासः (vārṣikāvāsaḥ), literally, the residence of the rainy season. (Note: Mahāvyutpatti gives a different term for summer residence: Sanskrit ग्रैष्मिकावासः (graiṣmikāvāsaḥ) is said to correspond to Tibetan: དཔྱིད་ས་, Wylie: dpyid sa.) Even though Gar Yarsa has acquired the name "Gartok" in popular parlance, officially, "Gartok" consists of both Gar Yarsa and Gar Gunsa (the "winter camp"). The latter is forty miles downstream on Gartang at a lower altitude.

The Lhasan administrators of Western Tibet based at Gartok were called Garpöns. They lived in Gar Gunsa for nine months of the year, and stayed at Gar Yarsa August–October.

== Description ==
Gar Yarsa lies on the road between Ladakh and Shigatse, (Note: Moorcroft writes that the road from Ladakh was a six days' journey, along the course of the Indus river, which was "tolerably level" and "thinly coated with coarse pasturage".) northeast of the present day Indian state of Himachal Pradesh, with all of which it has had trade relations. William Moorcroft regarded the Gar Valley as part of Changtang, whose main occupation was the production of pashmina wool.

By all accounts, Gar Yarsa appears to have been a small village. Moorcroft wrote that it was little more than an encampment, with a number of blanket tents and a few houses built of sun-dried bricks. Ladakhi envoy Abdul Wahid Radhu stated that nomad tents outnumbered solid houses. British explorer Cecil Rawling stated that Gartok had only "three good sized houses and twelve miserable hovels". The Garpons resided there for three months a year, during which Gartok became a busy centre of commerce. No less than 500 nomads and merchants would congregate there at any given time.

The village also has a small temple referred to as "Gar Yarsa gompa".

== History ==
=== Tibet–Ladakh-Mughal War ===
The rise of Gartok as the seat of Lhasa's authority in western Tibet occurred after the Tibet–Ladakh–Mughal War (1681–1684). Prior to this, the Gar Valley was part of Guge, which was either independent or under the control of Ladakh. In 1630, Ladakh had annexed the entire kingdom of Guge, including the Gar Valley. Through the war, Central Tibet, based in Lhasa, challenged Ladakh's supremacy.

During the war, the large army of Galdan Chhewang, Tibet's general, is said to have encamped in the Gar Valley. The first clash with Ladakhi forces took place near the confluence of the Gartang and Sengge Zangbo, with the locations Langmar and Rala mentioned in the sources.

After the end of the war, Galdan Chhewang organised the administration of the new province Ngari, and appointed Lozang Péma (Wylie: blo bzang pad ma) as governor (gzim dpon) before returning to Lhasa. (Note: This appears to have been Blo-bzan‐padma-bkra-śis-lde (Losang Béma Tashidé, 1676-1743), the last member of Guge's dynasty. He moved to Central Tibet in 1692 and remained there till his death.) The Tibetan government appointed prefects (rdzoṅ sdod) to the traditional districts of Purang, Tsaparang and Tashigang. But eventually Tashigang lost its importance, and Gartok took its place. Lhasa-appointed governors for the whole of Ngari, called Garpons, took their seat at Gartok.

Commercially, Gartok had the advantage of being equidistant between the Changtang, whose shepherds brought pashmina wool for sale, and their buyers in Ladakh and Bashahr.

=== 19th century ===
William Moorcroft was the first British official to set foot in western Tibet. He arrived in Daba in 1812, along with another adventurer Hearshey, disguised as an Indian gosain merchant. He was hoping to find Central Asian horses for East India Company's stud as well as any other profitable merchandise such as the pashmina wool. The officials in Daba sent him on to Gartok. The Garpon received them civilly and agreed to sell the goods they wanted. He was later punished by Lhasa with three years imprisonment, for permitting foreigners into the country.

The prohibition against foreigners did not apply to customary traders from Indian borderlands. However the sale of pashmina wool was limited to Ladakhis, as per the Treaty of Tingmosgang of 1684. Some wool did make it to Bashahr, which was an ally of Tibet during the Tibet–Ladakh–Mughal War, as well as Zanskar (along with its territories of Lahul and Spiti), which was part of the family of west Tibetan kingdoms. The British tried to exploit these connections later for acquiring pashmina wool.

In 1817, after the Anglo-Nepalese War, W. J. Webb, the East Indian Company's surveyor of Kumaon and Garhwal, also made efforts to enter Tibet for the purpose of surveying. He earned the trust of the Tibetan officials and was permitted limited entry, beyond which the officials said permission would be needed from Lhasa and Peking.

=== Early 20th century ===
Following the Younghusband Expedition to Tibet, the Convention of Lhasa was signed in 1904 between Tibet and the British Empire. As per the Convention, Gartok, together with Yatung and Gyantse, were to have trade marts for traders from British India, as well as British trade agents who would supervise the trade and resolve any issues. A British party under Captain C. H. D. Ryder, returned from Lhasa to India via Gartok, to ascertain its suitability as a trade agency. They found only a few dozen people in winter quarters, their houses being in the midst of a bare plain. They spent only one day at Gartok and found it deserted at that time of the year.

The British Empire elected to appoint a native Indian trade agent at Gartok, the first being Thakur Jai Chand. Jai Chand found the conditions harsh, living in "extreme isolation and discomfort" in a three-room mud hut, along with a medical assistant and a clerk. Having no authority and access to the region's leaders, Jai Chand was able to achieve little. The medical dispensary was however said to have been utilised to some extent. By 1907, it was clear that Gartok trade agency was a "dead end", but the British continued to maintain it in order to assert their treaty rights. Scholar Alex McKay remarks that Purang would have been the right place for a trade agency, being the trading and administrative centre. However, Gartok was chosen due to lack of knowledge at the time of the Younghusband expedition.

=== Post-World War period ===
In 1950, as the People's Republic of China sent forces to Lhasa in order to annex Tibet, it also sent a small force from Khotan in Xinjiang to Western Tibet, taking its people by surprise. The force travelled via the Keriya Pass to Gartok via a tedious route, arriving there in June 1951. In October 1951, the Chinese started to explore the possibility of opening a road route between Xinjiang and Rudok (through Keriya La). In late 1952, the 2nd Cavalry Regiment based at Gartok garrisoned Rudok with 150 men and 800 camels. The Indian trade agent at Gartok was denied permission to visit trade marts at Rudok. By 1953, the Chinese had a motorable jeep track between Xinjiang and Rudok.

In 1954, the Indian government and the Chinese government negotiated a new trade agreement, whereby India continued to maintain the three trade agencies, and China obtained the reciprocal right to operate trade agencies in India (which were in Delhi, Calcutta and Kalimpong). China declined to allow trade between Ladakh and Rudok. Instead, the "customary route" via Demchok and Tashigang was the only one allowed.

Sometime around this, China also appears to have changed course regarding the road from Xinjiang to Western Tibet, and chosen a route from Karghilik passing through the Karakash Valley and the Indian-claimed Aksai Chin region. The Indian trade agent was told by Chinese officials in September 1955 that they were constructing a Xinjiang–Gartok road via Rudok. In March 1957, the road was announced to have been completed.

== Bibliography ==
- Bhasin, Avtar Singh (2021), Nehru, Tibet and China, Penguin Random House, ISBN 9780670094134
- Fisher, Margaret W.; Rose, Leo E.; Huttenback, Robert A. (1963), Himalayan Battleground: Sino-Indian Rivalry in Ladakh, Praeger – via archive.org
- Handa, O. C. (2001), Buddhist Western Himalaya: A politico-religious history, Indus Publishing, ISBN 978-81-7387-124-5
- Lange, Diana (2020), An Atlas of the Himalayas by a 19th Century Tibetan Lama: A Journey of Discovery, BRILL, ISBN 978-90-04-41688-8
- McKay, A. C. (1992), "The Establishment of the British Trade Agencies in Tibet: A Survey", Journal of the Royal Asiatic Society, 2 (3): 399–421, doi:10.1017/S1356186300003023
- Meyer, Karl E.; Brysac, Shareen Blair (2009), Tournament of Shadows: The Great Game and the Race for Empire in Central Asia, Basic Books, ISBN 978-0-7867-3678-2
- Moorcroft, William; Trebeck, George (2004), Travels in the Himalayan Provinces of Hindustan and the Punjab in Ladakh and Kashmir: In Peshawar, Kabul, Kunduz and Bokhara from 1819 to 1825, Volume 1, London: John Murray, ISBN 978-81-206-0497-1 – via archive.org
- Mullik, B. N. (1971), My Years with Nehru: The Chinese Betrayal, Allied Publishers – via archive.org
- Petech, Luciano (September 1947), "The Tibetan-Ladakhi Moghul War of 1681-83", The Indian Historical Quarterly, 23 (3): 169– – via archive.org
- Petech, Luciano (1977), The Kingdom of Ladakh, c. 950–1842 A.D., Instituto Italiano Per il Medio ed Estremo Oriente – via archive.org
- Rawling, C. G. (1905), The Great Plateau, being an Account of Exploration in Central Tibet, 1903, and of the Gartok Expedition, 1904—1905, London: E. Arnold – via archive.org
- Wakefield, E. B. (1961), "A Journey to Western Tibet, 1929" (PDF), The Alpine Journal: 118–133
