= Cherko la =

Mountain pass in Gar, Ngari, Tibet

Cherko La
- Location within Ngari
- Elevation: 4,810 metres (15,780 ft)
- Traversed by: G219

Third Approach
- Location: Gar, Ngari, Tibet, China
- Range: Gangdise Shan (Transhimalaya, Tibetan Plateau)
- Coordinates: 31°21′N 80°36′E

Cherko la
- Traditional Chinese: 加果拉達坂
- Simplified Chinese: 加果拉达坂
Transcriptions

Cherko la (Chinese: 加果拉达坂) is a mountain pass in Gar, Ngari, Tibet. It forms the watershed between Langqen Zangbo and Gar Tsangpo, a headwater of Sengge Zangbo.
