= Günsa =

Günsa 昆沙乡
- Township
- Location in the Tibet Autonomous Region
- Coordinates: 32°06′51″N 80°03′37″E
- Country: People's Republic of China
- Autonomous region: Tibet
- Prefecture: Ngari
- County: Gar
- Elevation: 4,270 m (14,010 ft)

Population (2020)
  - Total: 2,718
- Time zone: UTC+8 (CST)

Gar Günsa (Tibetan: སྒར་དགུན་ས, Wylie: sgar dgun sa), also called Günsa or Kunsa (simplified Chinese: 昆沙乡; traditional Chinese: 昆沙鄉; pinyin: Kūnshā Xiāng), is a township in Gar County in the Ngari Prefecture of the Tibet region of China. Gar Günsa is situated on the bank of the Gartang River, one of the headwaters of the Indus River flowing to the south of the Kailash Range, at an elevation of 4,270 metres (14,010 ft). Gar Günsa, along with its sister encampment Gar Yarsa, used to be the administrative headquarters for Western Tibet (Ngari) and jointly referred to as Gartok. In 1965, the headquarters of Ngari was moved to Shiquanhe, which also serves as the headquarters of the Ngari Prefecture as whole.

The seat of the township is Gar Chongsar (སྒར་གྲོང་གསར; 噶尔新村; Gá'ěr Xīncūn; 'Gar New Village'). The Ngari Gunsa Airport is adjacent to the village. Two other administrative villages, Sogmai (སོག་སྨད) and Namru (གནམ་རུ) are part of the township.

== Name ==
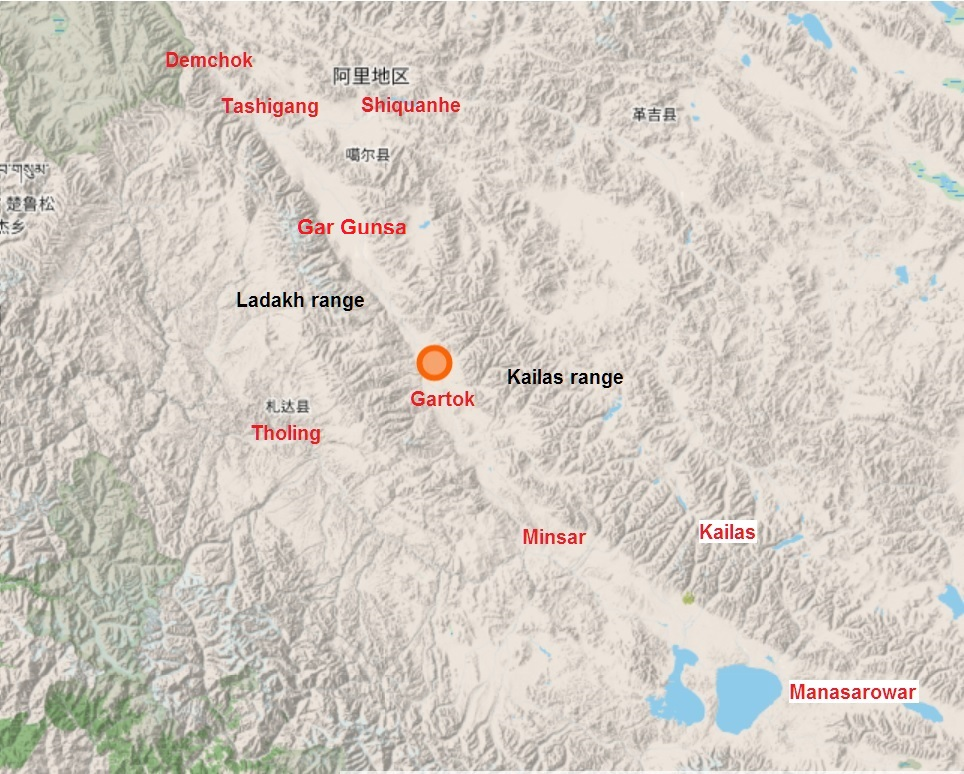
Gar Valley

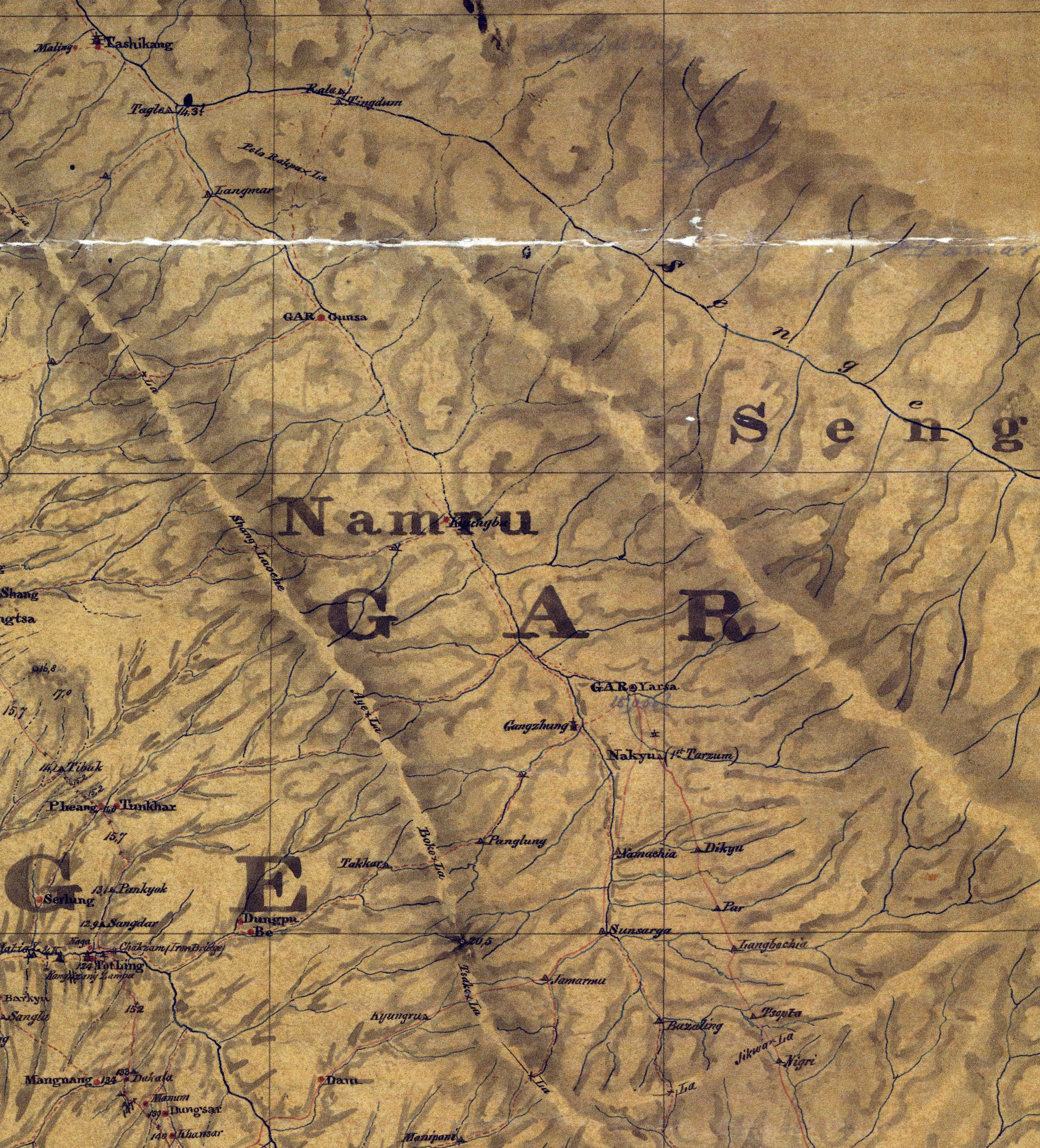
Map of the Gar valley by Strachey (1851) showing Gar Gunsa and Gar Yarsa. The Gartang river joins Sengge Zangbo at a location called Tagle, with Langmar and Rala nearby.

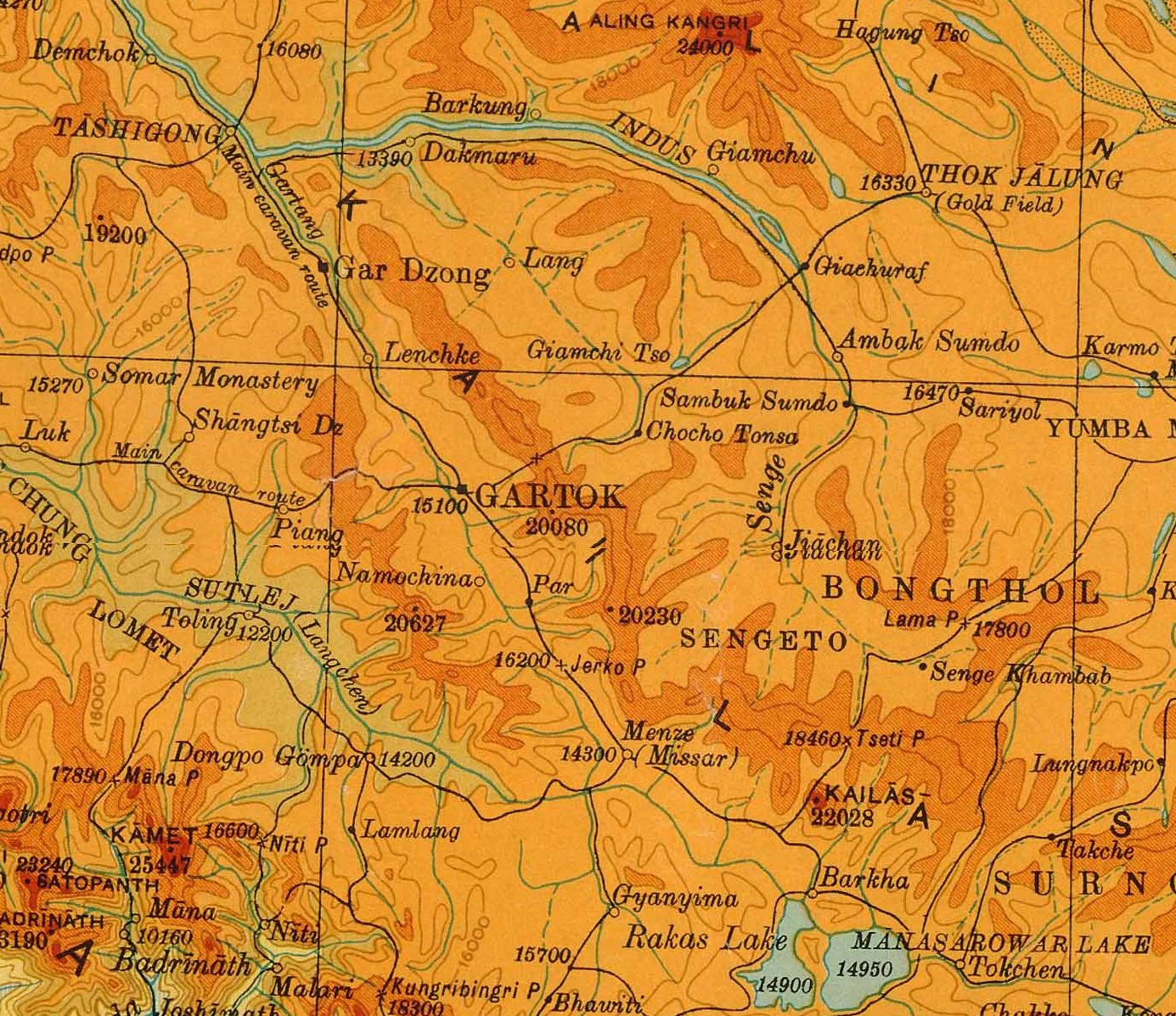
Map of the Gar valley in a Survey of India map (1936), showing Gartok (Gar Yarsa) and Gar Dzong (Gar Gunsa)

Gar (Wylie: sGar) means "encampment". During the 15th and 16th centuries, the Karma Kagyu lamas moved through the length and breadth of Tibet in "Great Encampments" or garchen. The term is also used often for military camps.

Gar Günsa means the "winter camp". The ninth century bilingual text Mahāvyutpatti translated günsa as Sanskrit हैमन्तिकावासः (haimantikāvāsaḥ), literally, the residence of the winter season. Even though Gar Yarsa has acquired the name "Gartok" in popular parlance, officially, "Gartok" consisted of both Gar Günsa and Gar Yarsa (the "summer camp"). The latter is forty miles upstream on Gartang at a higher altitude.

== History ==
=== Tibetan administration ===
Gar Günsa, along with its sister encampment Gar Yarsa, was referred to as "Gartok", and served as Lhasa's administrative headquarters for Western Tibet (Ngari) after it was conquered from Ladakh in 1684. A senior official called Garpön was stationed here. The Garpöns lived in Gar Gunsa for nine months in the year, and stayed at Gar Yarsa during August–October.

But in the British nomenclature, the name "Gartok" was applied only to Gar Yarsa and the practice continues till date.

=== Chinese administration ===
After the Chinese annexation of Tibet, Gar Günsa continued to function as the headquarters of Western Tibet till 1965, after which it was moved to Shiquanhe. It was felt that the living conditions in Gar Günsa were extremely difficult.

== See also ==
- List of towns and villages in Tibet

== Bibliography ==
- Handa, O. C. (2001), Buddhist Western Himalaya: A politico-religious history, Indus Publishing, ISBN 978-81-7387-124-5
- Lange, Diana (2020), An Atlas of the Himalayas by a 19th Century Tibetan Lama: A Journey of Discovery, BRILL, ISBN 978-90-04-41688-8
- Meyer, Karl E.; Brysac, Shareen Blair (2009), Tournament of Shadows: The Great Game and the Race for Empire in Central Asia, Basic Books, ISBN 978-0-7867-3678-2
- Moorcroft, William; Trebeck, George (2004), Travels in the Himalayan Provinces of Hindustan and the Punjab in Ladakh and Kashmir: In Peshawar, Kabul, Kunduz and Bokhara from 1819 to 1825, Volume 1, London: John Murray, ISBN 978-81-206-0497-1 – via archive.org
- Petech, Luciano (September 1947), "The Tibetan-Ladakhi Moghul War of 1681-83", The Indian Historical Quarterly, 23 (3): 169– – via archive.org
- Petech, Luciano (1977), The Kingdom of Ladakh, c. 950–1842 A.D. (PDF), Instituto Italiano Per il Medio ed Estremo Oriente – via academia.edu
- Rawling, C. G. (1905), The Great Plateau, being an Account of Exploration in Central Tibet, 1903, and of the Gartok Expedition, 1904—1905, London: E. Arnold – via archive.org
