= Sogmai =

Sogmai 索麦村 Suomai
- Village
- Location in the Tibet Autonomous Region
- Coordinates: 32°06′32″N 80°01′51″E
- Country: People's Republic of China
- Autonomous region: Tibet
- Prefecture: Ngari
- County: Gar
- Township: Günsa

Sogmai (Tibetan: སོག་སྨད་གྲོང་ཚོ།, ZWPY: Sogmä Chongco), or Suomai (simplified Chinese: 索麦村; traditional Chinese: 索麥村; pinyin: Suǒmài Cūn) is a village in Günsa Township, Gar County, Tibet Autonomous Region, China. It is the site of the Ngari Gunsa Airport.

== See also ==
- List of towns and villages in Tibet
