= Mayum La =

Mountain pass in Tibet, China

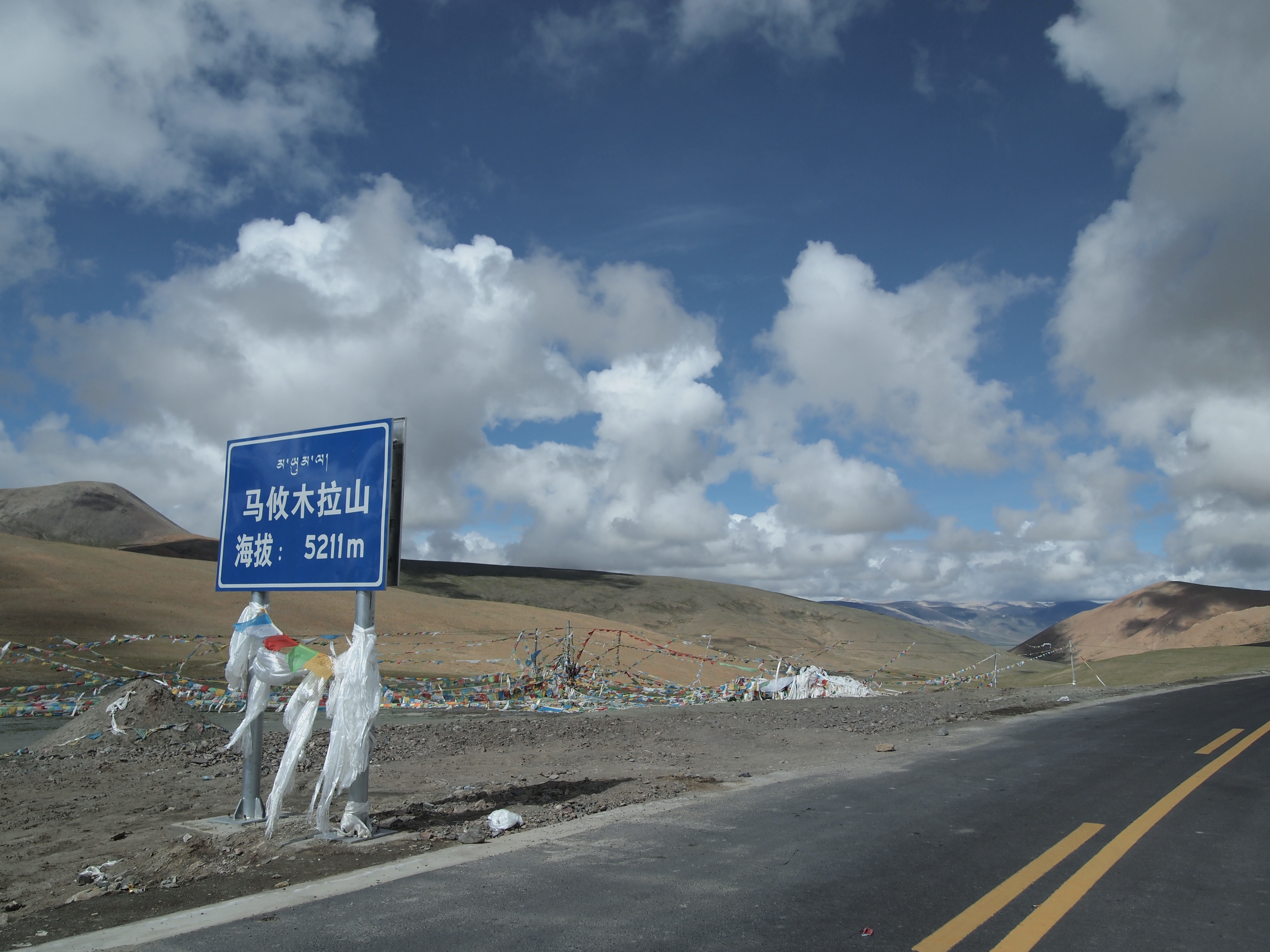
- G219 at Mayum La

- Location within Ngari
- Elevation: 5,211 metres (17,096 ft)
- Traversed by: G219

Third Approach
- Location: Burang, Ngari, Tibet, China
- Range: Gangdise Shan, Transhimalaya, Tibetan Plateau
- Coordinates: 30°36′53″N 82°25′38″E

Tibetan name
- Tibetan: མ་ཡུམ་ལ
Transcriptions
- Wylie: ma yum la
- THL: ma yum la

Chinese name
- Simplified Chinese: 马攸木拉
Transcriptions
Standard Mandarin
- Hanyu Pinyin: Mǎyōumù lā

Mayum La (Chinese: 马攸木拉达坂), also known as Mariám La, is a mountain pass to the east of Lake Manasarovar. It separates the drainage divide of the Dangque Zangbo, which is a headwater of Yarlung Tsangpo (Brahmaputra), and Langqen Zangbo (Sutlej River) in Tibet.
