= Tashigang, Ngari Prefecture =

Tashigang བཀྲ་ཤིས་སྒང་་
- Zhaxigang Village
- Location within Tibet
- Coordinates: 32°30′35″N 79°40′34″E
- Country: China
- Region: Tibet
- Prefecture: Ngari Prefecture
- County: Gar County
- Postal code: 859000
- Area code: 0897

Zhaxigang
- Chinese: 扎西崗村
- Simplified Chinese: 扎西岗村
- Hanyu Pinyin: Zhā xī gǎng cūn
- Literal meaning: "Tashigang Village"
Transcriptions
Standard Mandarin
- Hanyu Pinyin: Zhā xī gǎng cūn

Tashigang (Note: Alternative spellings include Trashigang, Tashikang, Tashigong and Tashegong. Older spellings were "Tushigung" (also "Chang Tushigung"), "Trescy-Khang", and "Tuzhzheegong".) (Tibetan: བཀྲ་ཤིས་སྒང་, Wylie: bkra shis sgang, THL: tra shi gang, transl. "auspicious hillock"), with a Chinese spelling Zhaxigang (Chinese: 扎西崗村; pinyin: Zhā xī gǎng cūn), is a village in the Gar County of the Ngari Prefecture, Tibet. The village forms the central district of the Zhaxigang Township. It houses an ancient monastery dating to the 11th century.

== Geography ==
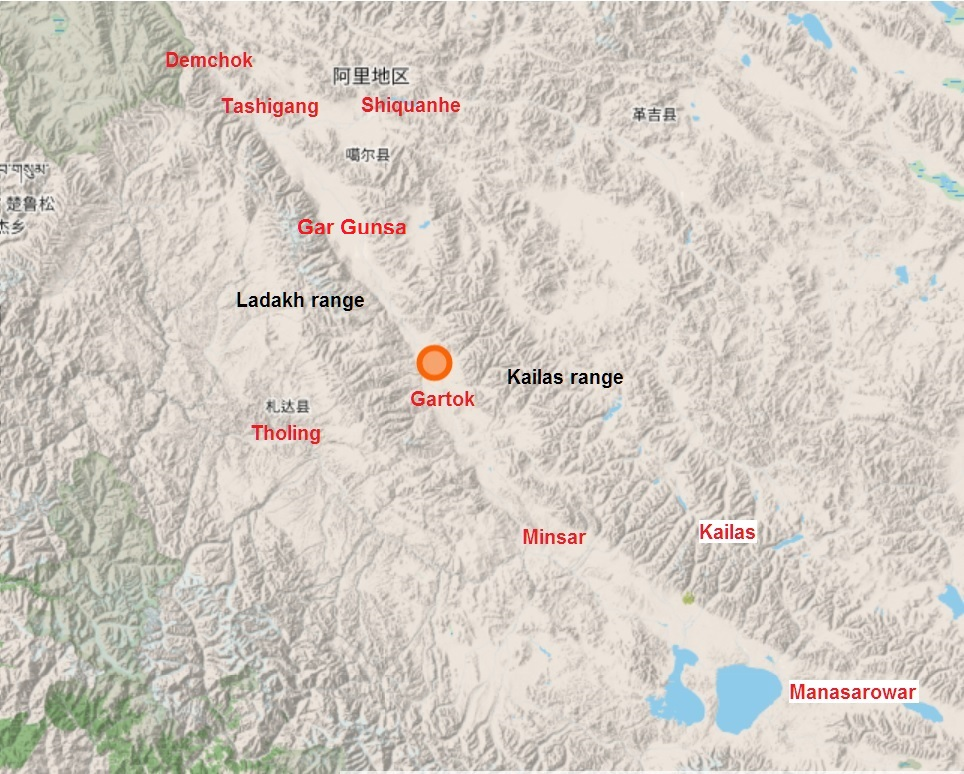
Gar and Sengge Zangbo valleys, with Tashigang at their confluence; Demchok is further down the Indus Valley (which is a continuation of the Gar Valley).

Tashigang is in the Indus Valley, close to the border with Ladakh (Indian union territory), near the confluence of the Sengge Zangbo and Gartang rivers (the two headwaters of the Indus River). Sven Hedin described the Tashigang monastery as follows:

Right in front of us the monastery Tashi-gang gradually grows larger. Its walls are erected on the top of an isolated rock of solid porphyrite, which crops up from the bottom of the Indus valley like an island drawn out from north to south. ... on the short side stand two round free-standing towers, ... The whole is surrounded by a moat 10 feet deep...

Tashigang was described by European travellers in the 18th and 19th centuries as the first Tibetan village, as they travelled from Ladakh towards Kailas–Manasarovar. It was at a distance of a day's march from Demchok, which was regarded as the Ladakh–Tibet border since the 17th-century Treaty of Tingmosgang between the two nations.

== History ==
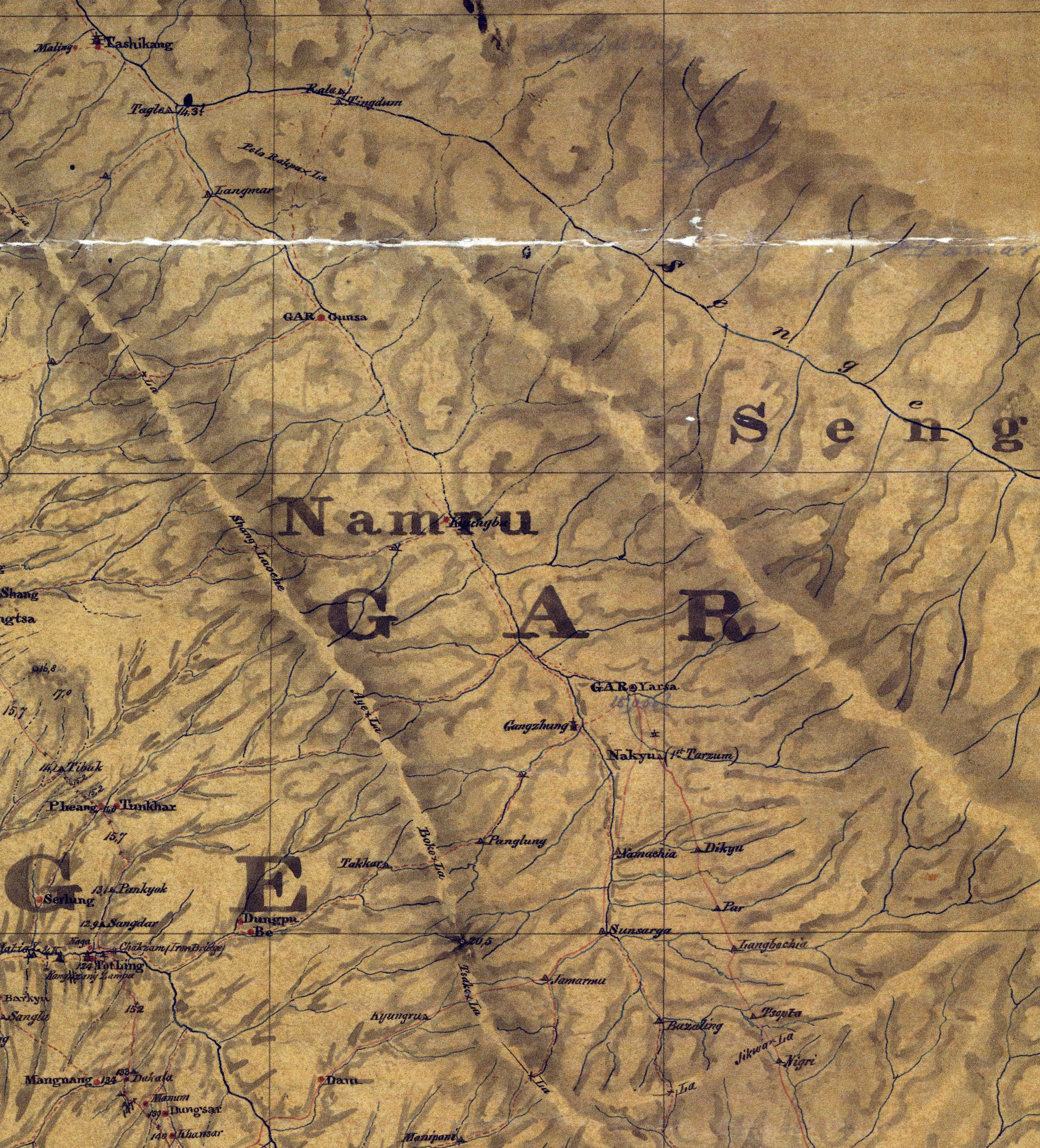
Gar and Sengge Zangbo valleys mapped by Henry Strachey, 1851

=== Early medieval period ===
During the Tibetan Era of Fragmentation, Kyide Nyimagon, a descendant of emperor Langdarma escaped to Western Tibet (then called Ngari or Ngari Khorsum) and established a small kingdom at Rala in the Sengge Zangbo valley close to Tashigang. He built a red fort (Kharmar). (Note: The ruins of a red fort claimed to have been built by Nyimagon are located at 32.48230°N 79.85917°E. A close-up photograph was published in Chinese National Geography.) (See Strachey's map for Rala.) Subsequently, Nyimagon expanded his kingdom to the entire Ngari. After his death, the kingdom was divided among his three sons, the eldest son receiving Maryul (Ladakh and Rudok), the second son receiving Guge-Purang and the third son Zanskar (in western Ladakh). According to the current interpretations of the sources, Ladakh's southern border was at Demchok Karpo, a stony white peak beside the Ladakhi village of Demchok. This would lead to the conclusion that Tashigang and the original Kharmar fort were part of Guge.

=== Medieval period ===
A monastery was founded at Tashigang by the New Tantra Tradition school of Rinchen Zangpo during the 10th–11th centuries. During the 13th–14th centuries, it was converted into a Kagyu monastery, along with several others in western Guge. Karl Ryavec suggests that this may have happened due to some political decline in the kingdom.

Ladakhi ruler Sengge Namgyal (r. 1616–1642) conquered and annexed Guge in 1630. He is credited with building a new monastery at Tashigang. It was a Drukpa monastery associated with Taktsang Repa.

During the reign of Sengge Namgyal's successor, Deldan Namgyal, Ladakh faced an invasion from Central Tibet under the Fifth Dalai Lama, who was at that time being assisted by the Mongol army. The forces defeated the Ladakhis in Guge, key battles being fought near Rala, and then invaded Ladakh itself. After three years of siege, the Ladakhis requested the help of Kashmiris (under Mughal empire), who drove them out of Ladakh. The retreating troops fled to Tashigang where they ensconced themselves in its fort.

Twenty five Mongol military officers are said to have settled in Tashigang. In 1715, the Jesuit missionary Ippolito Desideri found the region garrisoned by a body of "Tartar" (Mongol) and Tibetan troops, headed by a "Tartar prince". Even today, their descendants are called sog dmag ("the twenty-five Mongol Warriors"). The Drukpa monastery of Tashigang was converted to the Gelugpa order.

== Demographics ==
In 2013, Zhaxigang Village consisted of 111 households with a total of 332 people.

== Bibliography ==
- Gazetteer of Kashmir and Ladak, Calcutta: Superintendent of Government Printing, 1890
- Palat, Madhavan K., ed. (2016) [1962], "Report of the Officials of the Governments of India and the People's Republic of China on the Boundary Question", Selected Works of Jawaharlal Nehru, Second Series, Volume 66, Jawaharlal Nehru Memorial Fund/Oxford University Press, ISBN 978-01-994670-1-3 – via archive.org
- Ahmad, Zahiruddin (July 1960), "The Ancient Frontier of Ladakh", The World Today, 16 (7): 313–318, JSTOR 40393242
- Ahmad, Zahiruddin (September–December 1968), "New Light on the Tibet-Ladakh-Mughal War of 1679–84", East and West, 18 (3/4), Istituto Italiano per l'Africa e l'Oriente (IsIAO): 340–361, JSTOR 29755343
- Cheema, Brig Amar (2015), The Crimson Chinar: The Kashmir Conflict: A Politico Military Perspective, Lancer Publishers, pp. 51–, ISBN 978-81-7062-301-4
- Emmer, Gerhard (2007), "Dga' Ldan Tshe Dbang Dpal Bzang Po and the Tibet-Ladakh-Mughal War of 1679-84", Proceedings of the Tenth Seminar of the IATS, 2003. Volume 9: The Mongolia-Tibet Interface: Opening New Research Terrains in Inner Asia, BRILL, pp. 81–108, ISBN 978-90-474-2171-9
- Fisher, Margaret W.; Rose, Leo E.; Huttenback, Robert A. (1963), Himalayan Battleground: Sino-Indian Rivalry in Ladakh, Praeger – via archive.org
- Handa, O. C. (2001), Buddhist Western Himalaya: A politico-religious history, Indus Publishing, ISBN 978-81-7387-124-5
- Jinpa, Nawang (Autumn 2015), "Why Did Tibet and Ladakh Clash in the 17th Century?: Rethinking the Background to the 'Mongol War' in Ngari (1679-1684)", The Tibet Journal, 40 (2): 113–150, JSTOR /tibetjournal.40.2.113
- Lange, Diana (2017), "Decoding Mid-19th Century Maps of the Border Area between Western Tibet, Ladakh, and Spiti", Revue d'Études Tibétaines, The Spiti Valley Recovering the Past and Exploring the Present
- Ryavec, Karl E. (2015), A Historical Atlas of Tibet, University of Chicago Press, ISBN 978-0-226-24394-8
- Shakabpa, Tsepon Wangchuk Deden (2009), One Hundred Thousand Moons: An Advanced Political History of Tibet, BRILL, ISBN 978-90-04-17732-1
