= Zhaxigang Township =

Zhaxigang Township 扎西岗乡 • བཀྲ་ཤིས་སྒང་
- Location within Tibet
- Coordinates: 32°30′35″N 79°40′34″E
- Country: China
- Region: Tibet
- Prefecture: Ngari Prefecture
- County: Gar County
- Postal code: 857000
- Area code: 0892

Zhaxigang Township (Tibetan: བཀྲ་ཤིས་སྒང་, Wylie: bkra shis sgang, THL: tra shi gang, transl. "auspicious hillock"; simplified Chinese: 扎西岗乡; traditional Chinese: 扎西崗鄉; pinyin: Zhāxīgǎng xiāng) is a township-level administrative unit under the jurisdiction of Gar County, Ngari Prefecture, Tibet Autonomous Region. It has jurisdiction over Zhaxigang Village, Luma Village and Dianjiao Village.

According to the data of the Fifth National Population Census, the resident population of Zhaxigang Township was 729. And its Statistical division code is 542523203000.
