= Zoco =

Zoco may refer to:

- Ignacio Zoco (1939–2015), Spanish soccer player of the 1960s
- Zoco, Tibet
- A brand name of the Spanish liqueur Patxaran
