= Langbo Kangri =

Mountain peak in Nepal

- Location within Nepal Location within Tibet Location within China Location within Asia

Highest point
- Elevation: 6,648 m (21,811 ft)
- Prominence: 1,476 m (4,843 ft)
- Coordinates: 28°29′51″N 85°09′25″E

Geography
- Countries: Nepal and China
- Parent range: Himalayas

Langbo Kangri (also known as Langpo Kangri) is a mountain peak in the Himalayas on the border of Nepal and Tibet Autonomous Region of China.

== Location ==
The peak's location is shared between Nepal's Gandaki Province and China's Ngari Prefecture at 6,648 m (21,811 ft) above sea level. The prominence is at 1,476 m (4,843 ft).

The peak is located 12.17 km north-northeast of Yangra Kangri (Ganesh I), to which a ridge connects it. The gap height is 1474 m. At 3.88 km further north rises the Pashuwo at 6,177 m (20,266 ft).

== Climbing history ==
There are no documented ascents of Langbo Kangri.
