= Ali CMB Polarization Telescope =

Radio telescope in China

- Location: Ngari Prefecture, Tibet Autonomous Region, People's Republic of China
- Coordinates: 32°18′38″N 80°01′50″E
- Organization: Institute of High Energy Physics
- Altitude: 5,250 m (17,220 ft)
- Built: 2017–2025
- First light: 2025
- Diameter: 720 mm (2 ft 4 in)
- Location within Tibet

The Ali CMB Polarization Telescope (AliCPT) is a telescope for the measurement of primordial gravitational waves (gravitational echoes of the Big Bang) located in Ngari (Ali) Prefecture, Tibet Autonomous Region, China. It is a 90/150 GHz two-lens refracting telescope with a 72 cm aperture. AliCPT is the only cosmic microwave background (CMB) imager in the northern hemisphere. The telescope is operated by an international collaboration led by the Institute of High Energy Physics, Chinese Academy of Sciences, with scientists from China, the United States and Europe. The telescope started operations in 2025.

== Construction ==
Since the 1990s, China, Japan, and South Korea had been in talks to construct a large high-altitude observatory in western China. A site near Shiquanhe, Tibet was selected in 2007. By 2012, atmospheric conditions from the site's elevation 5,050 m (16,570 ft) above sea level were roughly characterized, initial facilities (including two small domes) were built, and a 25 cm pathfinder telescope project was in place, with 50 and 60 cm telescopes planned for 2013 and 2014 and a 3 m telescope in the indefinite future: but the ambitions for the site included the possibilities of megaprojects like a 30 m-class competitor to E-ELT and a 10–20 m class spectrometer as a sequel to LAMOST.

Also planned for the site was the Ali CMB Polarization Telescope (AliCPT) for studying the polarization of the cosmic microwave background (CMB). This location is, during winter, high and dry, similar to the South Pole location of the BICEP and Keck Array telescopes, with a logistical advantage of being 30 minutes' drive from the airport and city.

Construction begun on the first CMB telescope, codenamed Ngari No.1, in 2017. It was subsequently officially named AliCPT-1.

== Site ==
AliCPT-1 is located in Ngari (Ali) Prefecture of Tibet, on a high peak of the Gangdise Mountains at 5,250 m (17,220 ft) above sea level. The site is located 30 km away from Shiquanhe and 20 km away from the Ngari Gunsa Airport. The site is equipped with three weather stations monitoring pressure, wind speed and direction, and temperature. Grid power is the main power source on site, complemented by solar panels, a diesel power generator, and a UPS power backup system. The site is also equipped with high-speed wired data service, full environmental heater/air conditioner units, and all the facilities needed to assemble and operate the receiver, including a crane and a workshop in a high-bay room. An on-site oxygen system is also available.
