= Shiquanhe =

Shiquanhe 狮泉河镇 · སེང་གེ་ཁ་འབབ་གྲོང་རྡལ།
- Town
- Sênggêzangbo
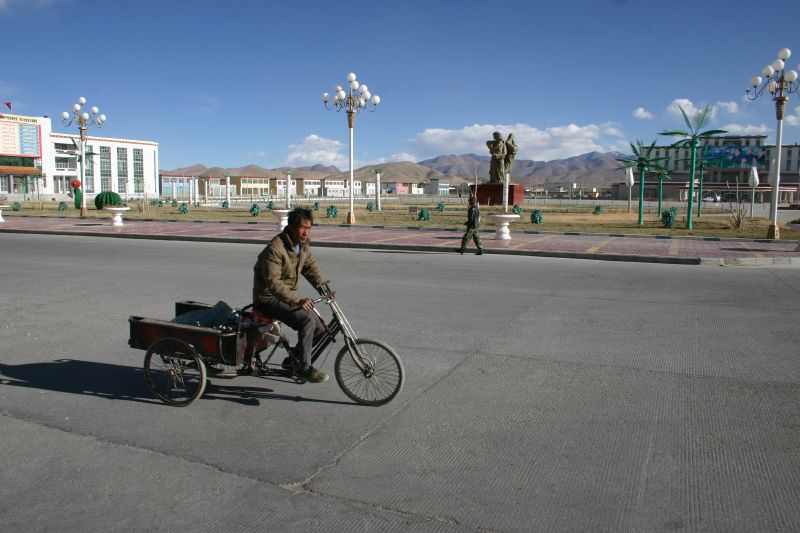
- The main square in Shiquanhe

- Location of Shiquanhe in Tibet Autonomous Region Location of Shiquanhe in Ngari Prefecture Location of Shiquanhe in China
- Coordinates (Shiquanhe town government): 32°29′35″N 80°06′06″E
- Country: People's Republic of China
- Region: Tibet Autonomous Region
- Prefecture: Ngari
- County: Gar
- Elevation: 4,255 m (13,960 ft)

Population (2020)
  - Total: 24,112
- Time zone: UTC+8 (CST)
- Postal code: 859000

Shiquanhe

Chinese name
- Simplified Chinese: 狮泉河
- Traditional Chinese: 獅泉河
Transcriptions
Standard Mandarin
- Hanyu Pinyin: Shīquánhé

Tibetan name
- Tibetan: སེང་གེ་ཁ་འབབ་གྲོང་རྡལ།་
Transcriptions
- Wylie: seng ge kha 'bab grong rdal
- Tibetan Pinyin: Sênggêkanbab Chongdai

Shiquanhe (Chinese: 狮泉河镇; lit. 'Lion Spring River Town'), known in Tibetan as Sênggêkanbab (Tibetan: སེང་གེ་ཁ་འབབ་, Wylie: seng ge kha 'bab, THL: seng gé kha bap) or Sênggêzangbo, is the main town and administrative seat of Ngari Prefecture, Tibet Autonomous Region, China. Shiquanhe is located on the bank of Sênggê Zangbo, the source stream of the Indus River, close to its confluence with the Gartang River.

== Name ==
This modern Chinese-built town is named after the Sengge Zangbo river, the main headwater of the Indus River, on whose banks it is located. It is called "Sengge Zangbo" or "Sengge Khabab" in Tibetan and "Shiquanhe" in Chinese. (Note: The name Shiquanhe is originally the name of the river; in Tibetan, it is Sengge Zangbo (in SASM/GNC/SRC transcriptions, sometimes simply Senge Zangbo), Senge Zangbu (森格藏布) or Sengghe Tsangpo (in a transcription used in Western books). The source of that river, a hot spring supposedly resembles a lion's mouth; hence the name, interpreted as "river flowing from lion's mouth".)

Being the headquarters of Ngari Prefecture (which is known in Chinese under the Sinicized form of its name, Ali Prefecture), the town is also commonly known in English as Ngari or Ali (Chinese: 阿里; pinyin: Ālǐ) Town; this is what many guidebooks use as the primary name for the town. In Tibetan, Ngari is only the name for the prefecture, and not the town.

Being the county seat of the Gar County, it is also referred to as Gar (simplified Chinese: 噶尔; traditional Chinese: 噶爾; pinyin: Ga'er). it may be labeled that way on maps.

== Description ==
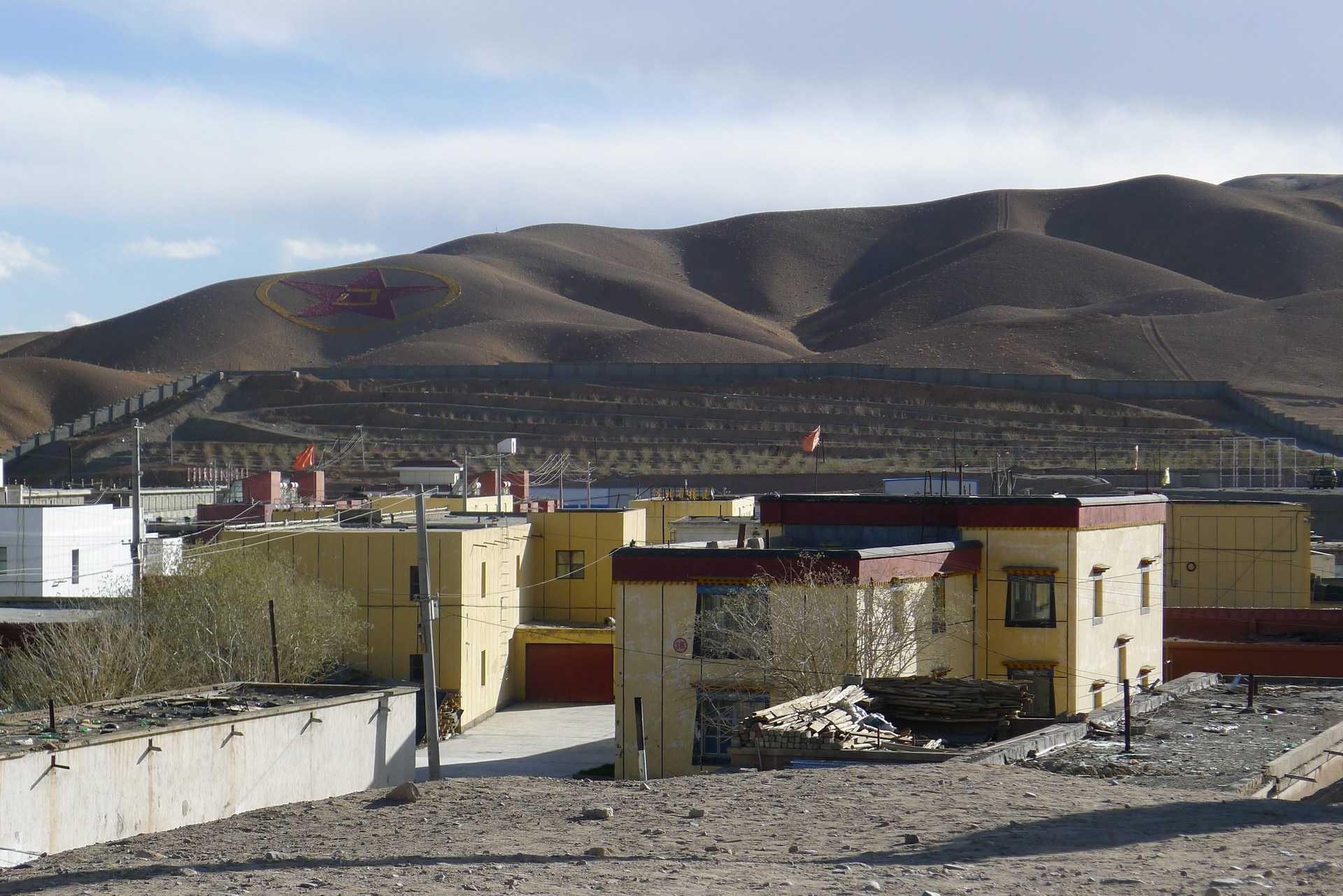
A view of the northern hill slopes from Shiquanhe; A giant PLA emblem is imprinted on the hillside on the left

When the Ngari Prefecture was established by the People's Republic of China in 1959, its capital was at Günsa (or Gar Gunsa), at the settlement called Gar Chongsar (སྒར་གྲོང་གསར), which is now the location of the Ngari Gunsa Airport.

In 1965, the capital was moved from Günsa to the newly built Shiquanhe town in 1965, due to the extremely difficult living conditions at the former. At that time, Shiquanhe had a population of 400 people.

Shiquanhe is a modern Chinese-style town, situated at the confluence of the Sengge River and the Longchu River. The population of Shiquanhe grew from just over 1,500 in 1978 to over 20,000 in 2008. Shiquanhe has a lion statue in the middle of the town. It has high-rise buildings, restaurants, general stores and nightclubs. There are several primary schools and a secondary school. It also has two banks, one of which, the Agricultural Bank of China, near the army post west of the roundabout, has foreign exchange facilities. There is also a post and telecom office.

== History ==
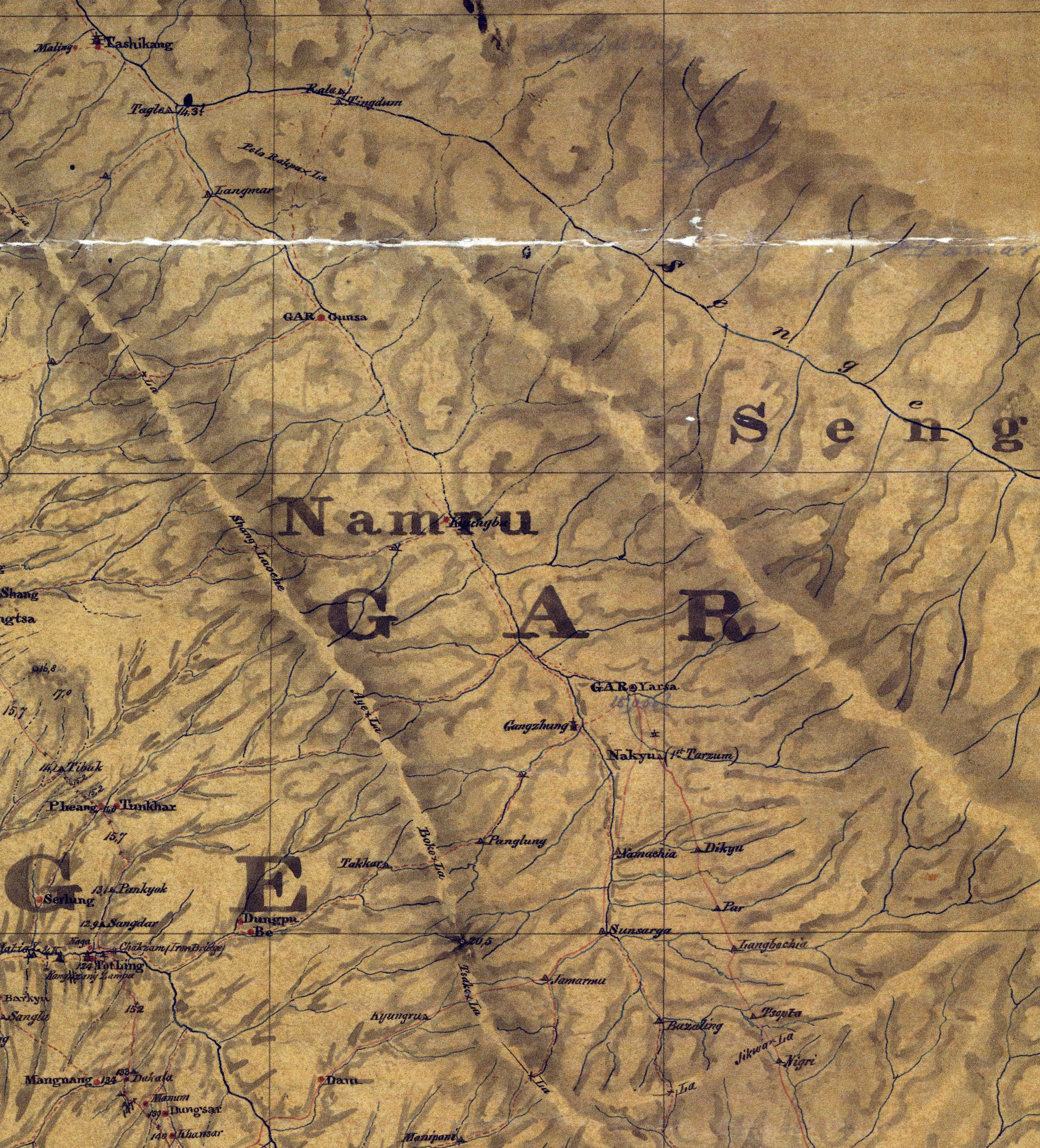
Sketch map of Gar and Sengge valleys, Henry Strachey, 1851

Even though Shiquanhe is a modern town, its location has been of significant importance in history. Not only is it situated in a wide valley of Sengge Zangbo with an abundance of cultivable land, it also lies along a trade route between Gar Gunsa and Rudok, which continues on to Ladakh in the west via the Pangong Lake, and, in the other direction, to Lhasa via the Mayum La pass. The region was historically known as Rala (Chinese: 热拉). (See Strachey's map.)

During the Tibetan Era of Fragmentation in the 10th century, Kyide Nyimagon, a descendant of emperor Langdarma, came to Ngari in the midst of chaos in Central Tibet and started a new kingdom in Rala. He is said to have started by building a Kharmar (reddish fort) in the region, also called Ralajong. (Note: The ruins of a red fort claimed to have been built by Nyimagon are located at 32.48230°N 79.85917°E.) Later he expanded into the Sutlej Valley and Burang by marrying a princess of Burang. This kingdom came to be known as Guge-Purang.

By the 17th century, Ladakh annexed the entire kingdom of Guge and invited retaliation from Central Tibet under the 5th Dalai Lama. The large of army of Galdan Chhewang, Tibet's general, encamped in the Gar Valley. The first clash with the Ladakhi forces took place near the confluence of the Gartang and Sengge Zangbo, with the locations Langmar and Rala mentioned in the sources. The Ladakhis were defeated and Galdan Chhewang pursued them to Ladakh, leading to the Tibet–Ladakh–Mughal War and the Treaty of Tingmosgang.

== Transportation ==
Ngari Gunsa Airport, near the town of Shiquanhe, started operations on 1 July 2010, becoming the fourth civil airport in Tibet. Air China operates two flights a week from Chengdu to Ngari Gunsa via Lhasa, on Tuesdays and Fridays.

== Climate ==
Shiquanhe has a cold desert climate (Köppen climate classification: BWk) with short, very mild summers and very cold, dry winters.

Climate data for Shiquanhe, elevation 4,279 m (14,039 ft), (1991–2020 normals)
Month	Jan	Feb	Mar	Apr	May	Jun	Jul	Aug	Sep	Oct	Nov	Dec	Year
Record high °C (°F)	6.4 (43.5)	9.5 (49.1)	14.5 (58.1)	15.7 (60.3)	20.5 (68.9)	25.2 (77.4)	32.1 (89.8)	26.4 (79.5)	23.7 (74.7)	16.7 (62.1)	12.7 (54.9)	7.1 (44.8)	32.1 (89.8)
Mean daily maximum °C (°F)	−4.0 (24.8)	−1.8 (28.8)	2.7 (36.9)	8.1 (46.6)	13.0 (55.4)	18.5 (65.3)	22.0 (71.6)	20.8 (69.4)	16.8 (62.2)	8.8 (47.8)	3.6 (38.5)	−0.6 (30.9)	9.0 (48.2)
Daily mean °C (°F)	−11.7 (10.9)	−9.0 (15.8)	−4.4 (24.1)	0.9 (33.6)	5.7 (42.3)	11.3 (52.3)	15.0 (59.0)	14.2 (57.6)	9.9 (49.8)	1.3 (34.3)	−4.7 (23.5)	−9.0 (15.8)	1.6 (34.9)
Mean daily minimum °C (°F)	−19.3 (−2.7)	−16.6 (2.1)	−12.3 (9.9)	−7.0 (19.4)	−2.0 (28.4)	4.1 (39.4)	8.5 (47.3)	8.1 (46.6)	2.8 (37.0)	−7.0 (19.4)	−13.0 (8.6)	−17.1 (1.2)	−5.9 (21.4)
Record low °C (°F)	−36.7 (−34.1)	−30.2 (−22.4)	−25.3 (−13.5)	−17.9 (−0.2)	−11.2 (11.8)	−6.6 (20.1)	−0.6 (30.9)	−0.4 (31.3)	−10.0 (14.0)	−17.0 (1.4)	−23.5 (−10.3)	−32.9 (−27.2)	−36.7 (−34.1)
Average precipitation mm (inches)	1.6 (0.06)	1.7 (0.07)	1.1 (0.04)	1.3 (0.05)	2.9 (0.11)	5.8 (0.23)	22.9 (0.90)	25.3 (1.00)	5.5 (0.22)	1.7 (0.07)	0.2 (0.01)	0.6 (0.02)	70.6 (2.78)
Average precipitation days (≥ 0.1 mm)	1.8	2.0	1.3	0.9	2.0	2.8	7.0	8.7	3.1	0.7	0.4	0.6	31.3
Average snowy days	3.9	4.3	3.6	3.5	4.8	2.1	0.1	0.3	1.0	1.4	1.0	1.6	27.6
Average relative humidity (%)	34	33	29	27	28	30	37	42	34	24	24	26	31
Mean monthly sunshine hours	250.1	241.3	299.1	304.9	332.8	333.6	309.9	289.9	299.7	311.1	274.7	262.6	3,509.7
Percentage possible sunshine	78	77	80	78	77	78	72	71	82	90	88	85	80
Source: China Meteorological Administration all-time extreme temperature

== Ngari Observatory ==
Shiquanhe is the location of the Ngari Observatory, which includes AliCPT, a telescope for the measurement of primordial gravitational waves (gravitational echoes of the Big Bang). The site was chosen for its dry climate (about 1 millimeter of precipitation per year).
