= Zoco, Tibet =

Zoco གཙོ་ཚོ Tsotso, Goicang, Zuozuo
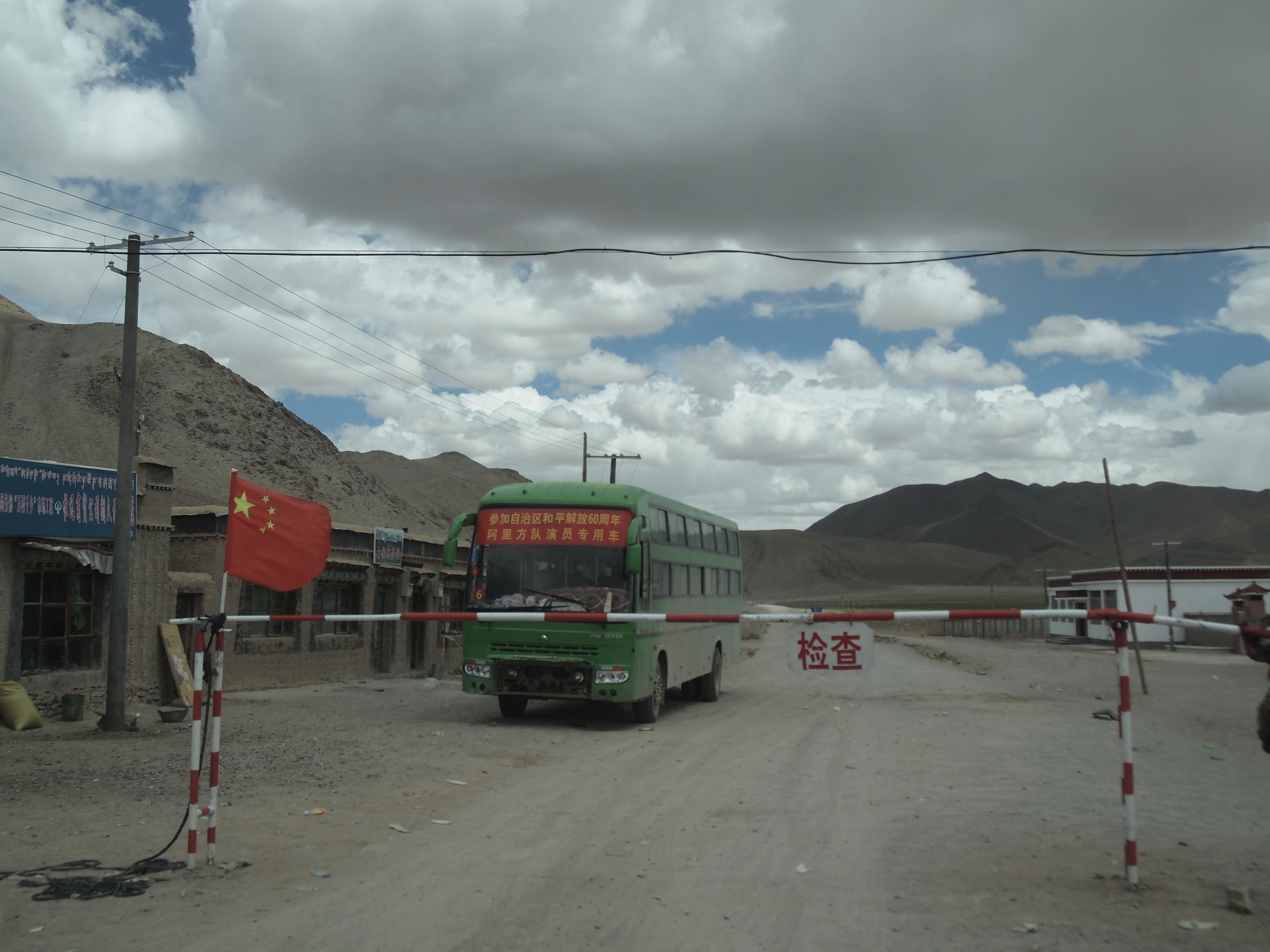
- Interactive map of Zoco
- Location within Tibet Autonomous Region
- Coordinates: 32.3590°N 80.4275°E
- Country: China
- Region: Tibet Autonomous Region

Population
  - Total
  - Major Nationalities: Tibetan
  - Regional dialect: Tibetan language
- Time zone: +8

Zoco or Tsotso (Tibetan: གཙོ་ཚོ, Wylie: gtso tsho, THL: tso tso; Chinese: 左左乡; pinyin: Zuǒ zuǒ xiāng), also called Goicang (Tibetan: རྒོད་ཚང་, Wylie: rgod tshang, THL: gö tsang) is a township in Gar County, Ngari Prefecture of Tibet Autonomous Region of China.

== See also ==
- List of towns and villages in Tibet
