= Maquan River =

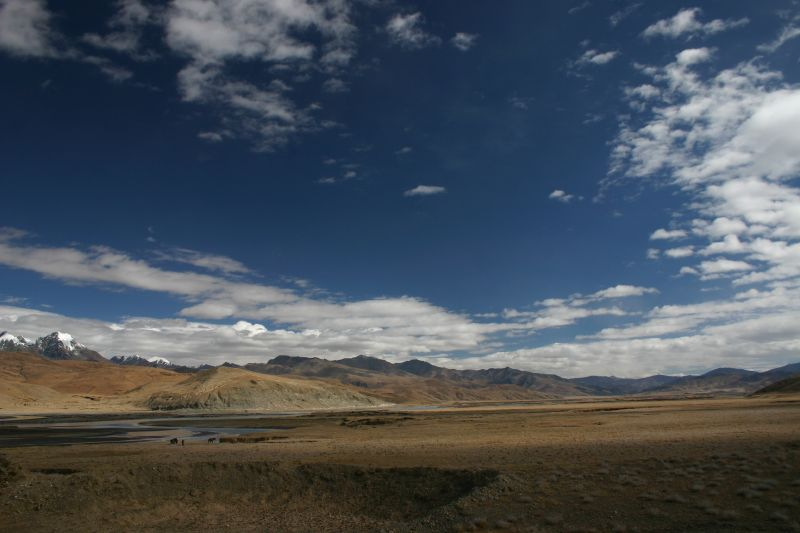

- Location in China

Location
- Country: China
- Region: Tibet Autonomous Region
- Prefecture: Ngari
- County: Burang

Physical characteristics
- Mouth
  - coordinates: 29°36′00″N 84°9′00″E

Maquan River (Chinese: 马泉河) or Dangque Zangbu (Tibetan: རྟ་མཆོག་གཙང་པོ; lit. 'horse river'; Chinese: 当却藏布) is the upper section of Yarlung Tsangpo. It is located in the Tibet Autonomous Region, in the southwestern part of the country, about 670 km (416 mi) west of the regional capital Lhasa.

The average annual rainfall is 561 mm (22.1 in). The rainiest month is July, with an average of 123 mm (4.8 in) rainfall, and the driest is April, with 14 mm (0.55 in) precipitation.
