= Gar Tsangpo =

Gar Tsangpo Gartang
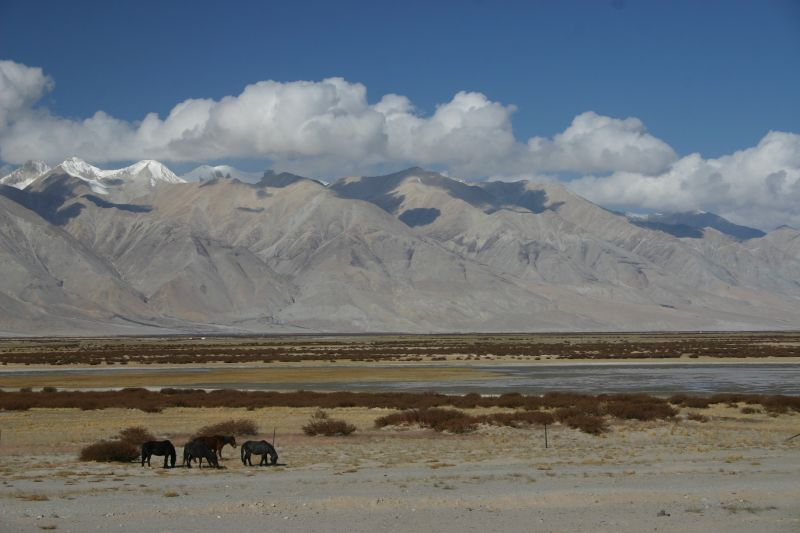
- Gar Tsangpo near the Ngari Gunsa Airport

- Confluence of Gar Tsangpo and Sênggê Zangbo
- Native name: སྒར་གཙང་པོ (Standard Tibetan)

Location
- Country: China
- State: Tibet Autonomous Region
- Region: Ngari Prefecture

Physical characteristics
- Source
  - location: Kailas Range
  - coordinates: 31.3836°N 80.7254°E
  - elevation: 5,000 metres (16,000 ft)
- Mouth
  - location: Sengge Zangbo, Gar Valley
  - coordinates: 32.4409°N 79.7121°E
  - elevation: 4,300 metres (14,100 ft)
- Length: 130 km (81 mi)

Basin features
- Progression: Indus→ Arabian Sea

Gar Tsangpo (Tibetan: སྒར་གཙང་པོ, Wylie: sgar gtsang po; Chinese: 噶尔藏布; pinyin: Găěr Zàngbù), also called Gartang or Gar River, is a headwater of the Indus River in the Ngari Prefecture, Tibet, China. It merges with other headwater, Sênggê Zangbo, near the village of Tashigang to form the Indus River. The combined river flows in the same valley and in the same direction as Gar Tsangpo. Thus by physical geography, Gar Tsangpo is the "Indus River". The Tibetans however regard Sênggê Zangbo as the main Indus River, and treat Gar Tsangpo as a tributary.

Gartok, the former administrative headquarters of Ngari is in the Gar Valley. The present headquarters, under PRC administration, is at Shiquanhe in the Sênggê Zangbo valley, close to the point of confluence of the two rivers.

== Course ==
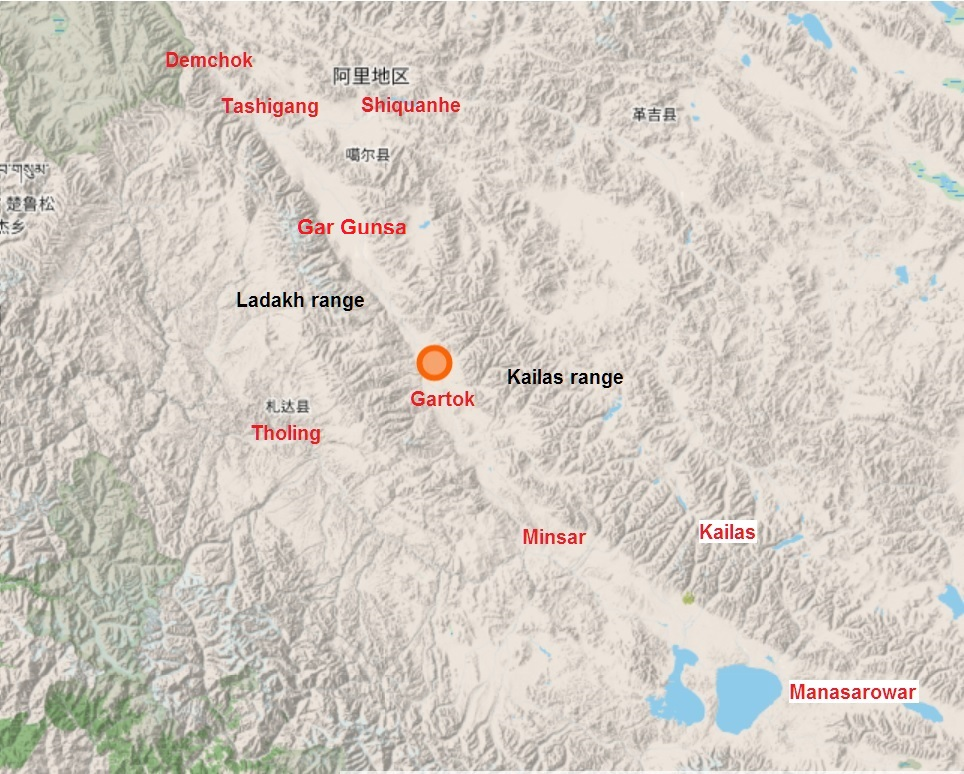
Gar Valley with Gar Yarsa marked as Gartok.

The sources of Gartang are on the southwestern slopes of the Kailas Range (Gangdise Shan). From there, the river flows northwest in the Gar Valley, the tectonic valley between the Kailas Range and the Ladakh Range. The slope of the valley is extremely gentle, only about 2 metres per kilometre.

After a distance of 130 kilometres (81 mi), the Gartang joins Sengge Zangbo (Shiquan He), which originates on the northern slopes of Mount Kailas and flows in a wide arc towards the Gar Valley. The point of confluence is near the town of Tashigang (Zhaxigang). After the confluence, the combined river, regarded as the Indus River, flows in the same direction as Gartang. For this reason, western explorers have traditionally regarded Gartang as the main source of the Indus River. However, the Tibetans regard Sengge Zangbo as the main Indus River and the Gartang as its tributary.

The Gartang river drains an area of 6,060 km2.

== History ==
Two well-known villages cum encampments, Gar Yarsa and Gar Gunsa, lie along the course of the Gartang, separated by 40 miles (64 km). The two locations together have been called "Gartok" and served as the administrative headquarters of Ngari (West Tibet) during the Ganden Phodrang administration of Tibet. The Lhasa-appointed administrator, called Garpön, used to stay at Gar Yarsa during the summemr months, and at Gar Gunsa during the winter. After the Chinese annexation of Tibet in 1950, the headquarters of Ngari was moved to a new town of Shiquanhe on the Sengge Zangbo river.

== Bibliography ==
- I︠U︡sov, B. V. (1959), Physical Geography of Tibet, U.S. Joint Publications Research Service
