= Prefecture (China) =

Second-level administrative divisions of China

Prefecture 地区 Dìqū
- Category: Second level administrative division of a unitary state
- Location: China
- Number: 7 prefectures
- Populations: 95,465 (Ngari) – 3,979,362 (Kashgar)
- Areas: 46,755 km^{2} (18,052 sq mi) (Daxing'anling) – 304,683 km^{2} (117,639 sq mi) (Ngari)
- Government: Various, Central Government
- Subdivisions: Counties

Prefecture

Chinese name
- Simplified Chinese: 地区
- Traditional Chinese: 地區
Transcriptions
Standard Mandarin
- Hanyu Pinyin: Dìqū
Southern Min
- Hokkien POJ: tē-khu / tē-khi / tōe-khu
Eastern Min
- Fuzhou BUC: dê-kṳ̆

Tibetan name
- Tibetan: ས་ཁུལ།
Transcriptions
- Wylie: sa khul
- Tibetan Pinyin: sakü

Vietnamese name
- Vietnamese: Địa khu

Zhuang name
- Zhuang: Dagih

Korean name
- Hangul: 지구
Transcriptions
- Revised Romanization: jigu
- McCune–Reischauer: chigu

Mongolian name
- Mongolian Cyrillic: дугарг
- Mongolian script: ᠲᠣᠭᠣᠷᠢᠭ
Transcriptions
- SASM/GNC: toɣoriɣ

Uyghur name
- Uyghur: ۋىلايەت
Transcriptions
- Latin Yëziqi: wilayét
- Siril Yëziqi: вилайәт

Manchu name
- Manchu script: ᡳ ᠪᠠ
- Möllendorff: i'ba

Kazakh name
- Kazakh: ايماق аймақ aimaq

Kyrgyz name
- Kyrgyz: ايماق аймак ajmaq

Prefectures are one of four types of prefecture-level divisions in China, the second-level administrative division in the country. While at one time prefectures were the most common prefecture-level division, they are in the process of being abolished and only seven formally-designated prefectures remain.

== Modern prefectures ==
Prefectures are administrative subdivisions of provincial-level divisions. The constitution of the People's Republic of China does not endorse any prefecture-level division, except for autonomous prefectures. Prefectures and leagues are not at all mentioned; provinces are explicitly stated to be divided directly into counties.

The administrative commission (Chinese: 行政公署; pinyin: xíngzhèng gōngshǔ) is an administrative branch office with the rank of a national ministerial department (司级) and dispatched by the higher-level provincial government. The leader of the prefecture government, titled as prefectural administrative commissioner (行政公署专员; xíngzhèng gōngshǔ zhūanyūan), is appointed by the provincial government. Instead of local people's congresses, the prefecture's working commission of the standing committee of the provincial people's congress is dispatched and supervises the prefecture governments but can not elect or dismiss prefecture governments. The prefecture's working committee of the provincial committee of the Chinese People's Political Consultative Conference (CPPCC) is a part of the prefecture's committee of the CPPCC. This means that the prefecture's working committee of the CPPCC is a branch of the provincial committee of the CPPCC, not an individual society entity. The same is valid for provincial CPPCCs, which are formally sections of the national CPPCC.

The term "prefecture" derives from the former circuit, which was a level between provinces and the counties during the Qing dynasty. In 1928, the government of the Republic of China abolished circuits and provinces began to administer counties directly; however, this reform was soon found unfeasible because some provinces had hundreds of counties. Consequently, in 1932, provinces were again subdivided into several prefectures, and regional administrative offices were set up.

=== List of prefectures ===
| Name | Chinese | Provincial-level region | Population (2010) | Area (km^{2}) | Prefecture seat |
|---|---|---|---|---|---|
| Daxing'anling Prefecture | 大兴安岭地区 | Heilongjiang | 511,564 | 46,755 | Jiagedaqi District (de facto); Mohe city (de jure) |
| Ngari Prefecture | 阿里地区 | Tibet | 95,465 | 304,683 | Sênggêzangbo town, Gar County |
| Altay Prefecture | 阿勒泰地区 | Xinjiang | 603,280 | 117,988 | Altay city |
| Tacheng Prefecture | 塔城地区 | Xinjiang | 1,219,212 | 94,891 | Tacheng city |
| Kashgar Prefecture | 喀什地区 | Xinjiang | 3,979,362 | 112,058 | Kashgar city |
| Aksu Prefecture | 阿克苏地区 | Xinjiang | 2,370,887 | 128,099 | Aksu city |
| Hotan Prefecture | 和田地区 | Xinjiang | 2,014,365 | 248,946 | Hotan city |

== Historical prefectures ==
In general, the word "prefecture" is applied to xian for the period before the Sui and Tang dynasties; for the period after, xian are called "districts" or "counties", while "prefectures" refer to zhou and fu.

=== Xian ===
Xian (县/縣) were first established during the Warring States period, and have existed continuously ever since. Today, they continue to form an important part of the political divisions of China.

Xian has been translated using several English language terms. In the context of ancient history, "district" and "prefecture" are the most commonly used terms, while "county" is generally used for more contemporary contexts.

=== Zhou ===
Zhou (州) were first established during the Han dynasty, and were abolished only with the establishment of the Republic of China.

Zhou is generally translated as "province" or "region" for the period before the Sui dynasty, and "prefecture" for the period from the Sui dynasty onwards.

The People's Republic of China has revived the word zhou as part of the term "zizhizhou" (自治州), which is translated as "autonomous prefectures", as described above.

=== Fu ===
Fu (府) were first established during the Tang dynasty, and were also abolished with the establishment of the Republic of China.

During the Tang and Song dynasties, the term was mainly applied to prefectures with major urban centers. For this period, it is often translated as "urban prefecture" or "superior prefecture". Later, however, most first-level prefectures under provinces would become known as fu.

== See also ==
- Administrative divisions of China
- Prefecture-level divisions of China

- Prefecture-level city
- Leagues in China
- Autonomous prefecture
