= Gar County =

Gar County 噶尔县 • སྒར་རྫོང་། Senge Tsangpo, Gaer
- County
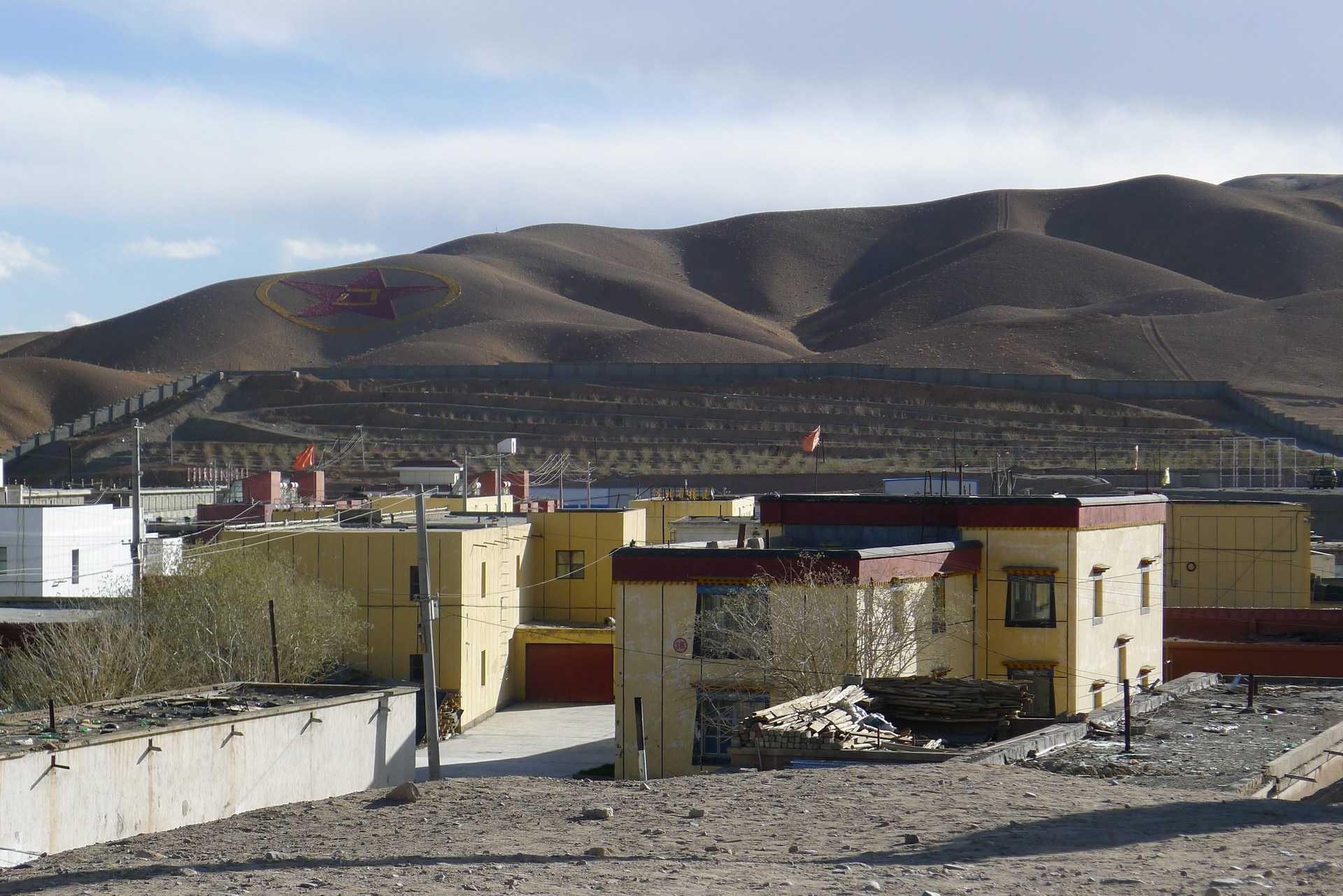
- PLA emblem on the hill near Shiquanhe

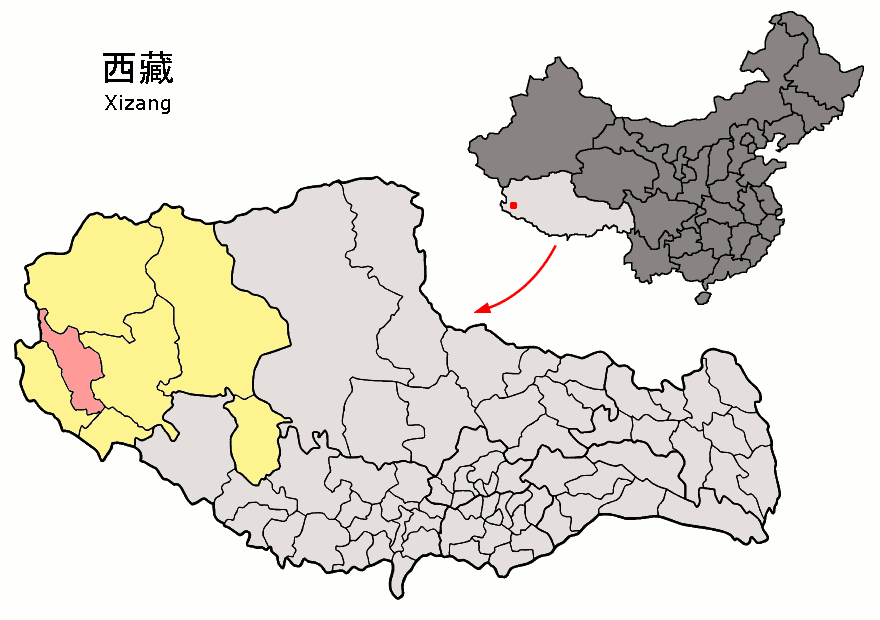
- Location of Gar County within Tibet Autonomous Region

- Location of the seat in the Tibet AR Gar (Tibet) Gar (China)
- Coordinates (Gar County government): 32°29′32″N 80°05′48″E
- Country: China
- Autonomous region: Tibet
- Prefecture: Ngari
- County seat: Sênggêkanbab (Shiquanhe, Gar)

Area
  - Total: 17,669.72 km^{2} (6,822.32 sq mi)

Population (2020)
  - Total: 31,052
  - Density: 1.7574/km^{2} (4.5515/sq mi)
- Time zone: UTC+8 (China Standard)
- Website: ge.al.gov.cn

Gar County

Chinese name
- Simplified Chinese: 噶尔县
- Traditional Chinese: 噶爾縣
Transcriptions
Standard Mandarin
- Hanyu Pinyin: Gá'ěr Xiàn

Tibetan name
- Tibetan: སྒར་རྫོང་།
Transcriptions
- Wylie: sgar rdzong
- Tibetan Pinyin: Gar Zong

Gar County (Note: An alternative spelling is Gaer County.) (Tibetan: སྒར་རྫོང་།; Chinese: 噶尔县), formerly Senge Tsangpo County, is a district (county) in the Ngari Prefecture of the western Tibet Autonomous Region of China. The main town is Shiquanhe (Sênggêkanbab), also called "Gar", on account of being the county seat, and "Ali", on account of being the seat of Ngari Prefecture. (Note: "Ali" is a Chinese spelling for Ngari.)

== Administrative divisions ==
Gar county is divided into 1 town and 4 townships:

Name	Chinese	Hanyu Pinyin	Tibetan	Wylie
Town
Sênggêkanbab Town (Shiquanhe, Sênggêzangbo, Gar)	狮泉河镇	Shīquánhé zhèn	སེང་གེ་ཁ་འབབ་གྲོང་རྡལ།	seng ge kha 'bab grong rdal
Townships
Günsa Township	昆莎乡	Kūnshā xiāng	དགུན་ས་ཤང་།	dgun sa shang
Zoco Township	左左乡	Zuǒzuǒ xiāng	གཙོ་ཚོ་ཤང་།	gtso tsho shang
Moincêr Township	门士乡	Ménshì xiāng	མོནམཚེར་ཤང་།	mon mtsher shang
Zhaxigang Township	扎西岗乡	Zhāxīgǎng xiāng	བཀྲ་ཤིས་སྒང་ཤང་།	bkra shis sgang shang

== Geography ==
Main rivers in the county include Sênggê Zangbo and Gar Zangbo.

== Climate ==
Gar County has a cool arid climate (Köppen BWk) with the temperature characteristics of a subalpine climate (Dwc). Summers are comfortable to warm with fairly frequent light showers, whilst winters are long, frigid but exceedingly dry and clear.

Climate data for Shiquanhe, elevation 4,279 m (14,039 ft), (1991–2020 normals)
Month	Jan	Feb	Mar	Apr	May	Jun	Jul	Aug	Sep	Oct	Nov	Dec	Year
Record high °C (°F)	6.4 (43.5)	9.5 (49.1)	14.5 (58.1)	15.7 (60.3)	20.5 (68.9)	25.2 (77.4)	32.1 (89.8)	26.4 (79.5)	23.7 (74.7)	16.7 (62.1)	12.7 (54.9)	7.1 (44.8)	32.1 (89.8)
Mean daily maximum °C (°F)	−4.0 (24.8)	−1.8 (28.8)	2.7 (36.9)	8.1 (46.6)	13.0 (55.4)	18.5 (65.3)	22.0 (71.6)	20.8 (69.4)	16.8 (62.2)	8.8 (47.8)	3.6 (38.5)	−0.6 (30.9)	9.0 (48.2)
Daily mean °C (°F)	−11.7 (10.9)	−9.0 (15.8)	−4.4 (24.1)	0.9 (33.6)	5.7 (42.3)	11.3 (52.3)	15.0 (59.0)	14.2 (57.6)	9.9 (49.8)	1.3 (34.3)	−4.7 (23.5)	−9.0 (15.8)	1.6 (34.9)
Mean daily minimum °C (°F)	−19.3 (−2.7)	−16.6 (2.1)	−12.3 (9.9)	−7.0 (19.4)	−2.0 (28.4)	4.1 (39.4)	8.5 (47.3)	8.1 (46.6)	2.8 (37.0)	−7.0 (19.4)	−13.0 (8.6)	−17.1 (1.2)	−5.9 (21.4)
Record low °C (°F)	−36.7 (−34.1)	−30.2 (−22.4)	−25.3 (−13.5)	−17.9 (−0.2)	−11.2 (11.8)	−6.6 (20.1)	−0.6 (30.9)	−0.4 (31.3)	−10.0 (14.0)	−17.0 (1.4)	−23.5 (−10.3)	−32.9 (−27.2)	−36.7 (−34.1)
Average precipitation mm (inches)	1.6 (0.06)	1.7 (0.07)	1.1 (0.04)	1.3 (0.05)	2.9 (0.11)	5.8 (0.23)	22.9 (0.90)	25.3 (1.00)	5.5 (0.22)	1.7 (0.07)	0.2 (0.01)	0.6 (0.02)	70.6 (2.78)
Average precipitation days (≥ 0.1 mm)	1.8	2.0	1.3	0.9	2.0	2.8	7.0	8.7	3.1	0.7	0.4	0.6	31.3
Average snowy days	3.9	4.3	3.6	3.5	4.8	2.1	0.1	0.3	1.0	1.4	1.0	1.6	27.6
Average relative humidity (%)	34	33	29	27	28	30	37	42	34	24	24	26	31
Mean monthly sunshine hours	250.1	241.3	299.1	304.9	332.8	333.6	309.9	289.9	299.7	311.1	274.7	262.6	3,509.7
Percentage possible sunshine	78	77	80	78	77	78	72	71	82	90	88	85	80
Source: China Meteorological Administration all-time extreme temperature

== Transport ==
- China National Highway 219
