= Garpön =

Local or Regional Tibetan leader

A garpön is historically a local or regional leader in Tibet and parts of Ladakh who has command and prominence over a district or area. He is highly regarded by the people and respected as a governor although his power and authority is informal in a given area. Ultimate leadership and spiritual leadership in Tibet was always given centrally to the Dalai Lama in the capital of Lhasa. Garpöns were usually regarded as localized ministers to maintain district order. With the establishment of People's Pepublic of China, the rulership of local district garpöns has diminished somewhat in the Tibet Autonomous Region. Sir Edward Birkbeck Wakefield has cited that in Ladakh there was often a senior and a junior garpön.

In the film Seven Years in Tibet (1997 film), a garpön in western Tibet was played by Samdup Dhargyal and was cited as being the eminent ruler of the province.

== See also ==
- Chogyal
- List of districts of Ladakh
- Politics of Ladakh
