= Sengge Zangbo =

Sengge Zangbo Sengge Khabab, Shiquan He
- Confluence of Gar Tsangpo and Sengge Zangbo
- Etymology: "Lion River"
- Native name: སེང་གེ་ཁ་འབབ། (Standard Tibetan)

Location
- Country: China
- State: Tibet Autonomous Region
- Region: Ngari Prefecture

Physical characteristics
- Source
  - location: Kailas Range, Gêgyai County, Tibet, China
  - coordinates: 31°18′44″N 81°48′42″E
  - elevation: 5,469.8 m (17,946 ft)
- Mouth
  - location: Gar Valley (Indus Valley)
  - coordinates: 32.4409°N 79.7121°E
  - elevation: 4,300 metres (14,100 ft)
- Length: 300 km (190 mi) (approx.)

Basin features
- Progression: Indus River

Sengge Zangbo, Sengge Khabab (Tibetan: སེང་གེ་ཁ་འབབ།, Wylie: seng ge kha 'bab) or Shiquan He (Chinese: 獅泉河; pinyin: Shīquán Hé) is a river in the Ngari Prefecture in the Tibet Autonomous Region, China that is the source stream of the Indus River, one of the major trans-Himalayan rivers of Central and South Asia. The river rises in the mountain springs north of the Manasarovar lake, and 300 km (190 mi) downstream joins the Gar Tsangpo river near the village of Tashigang. Although it is thereafter called the Indus internationally, the Tibetans continue to regard the combined river to be Sênggê Zangbo as it flows into Ladakh.

The town of Shiquanhe, the administrative headquarters of the Ngari Prefecture, is located in the lower valley of Sengge Zangbo, and is named after the river.

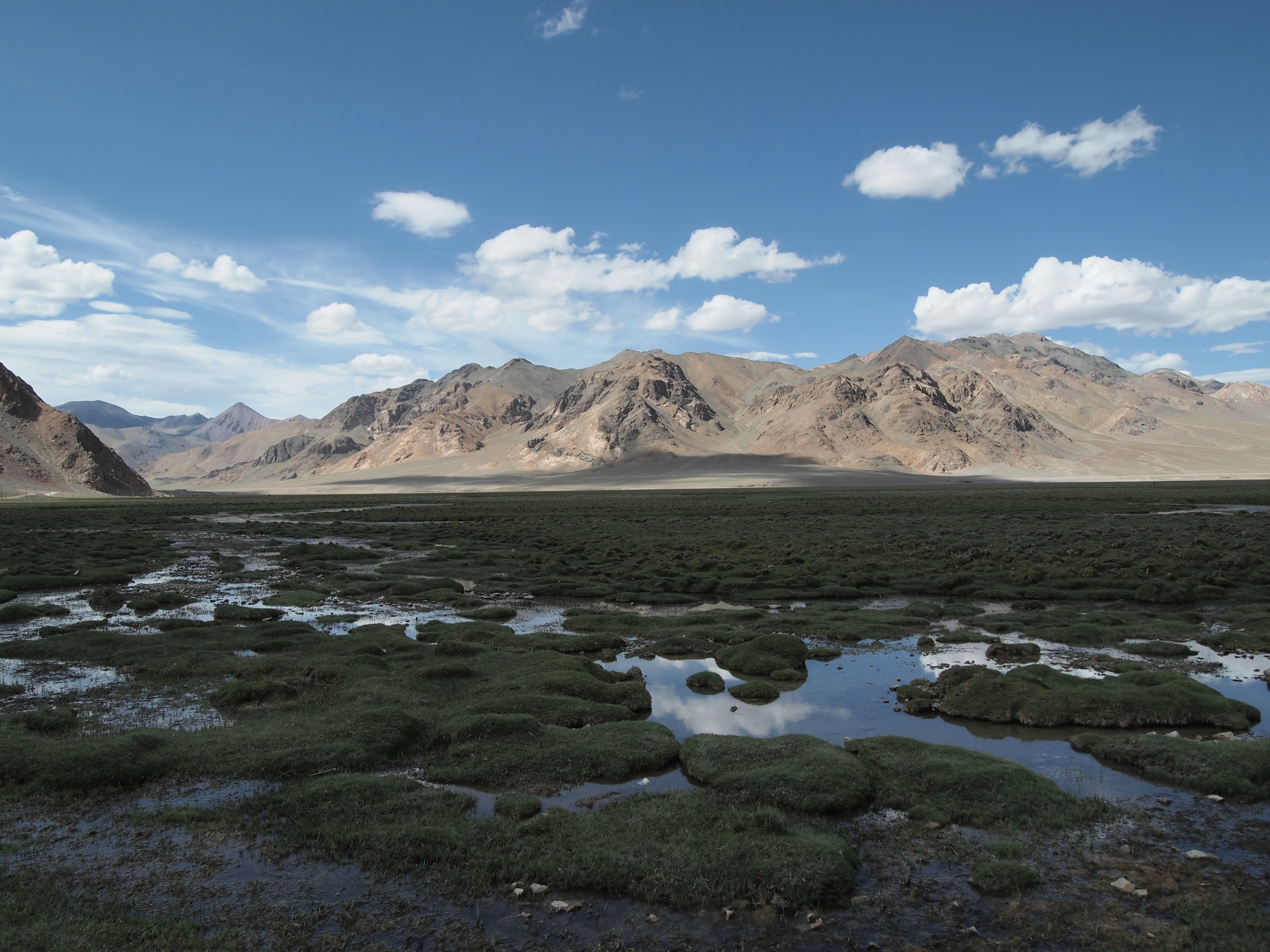
Chizuo Tsangpo, a tributary of Sengge Zangbo, near its confluence

The Sengge Zangbo drains an area of 27,450 square kilometres (10,600 sq mi), and covers a length of 430 kilometres (270 mi). Main tributaries include Gar Tsangpo. Other tributaries include the Langqu River, the Chizuo Tsangpo River, and the Charinongqu River.

== Bibliography ==
- Chodag, Tiley (1988), Tibet, the Land and the People, translated by Bkras-gliṅ Dbaṅ-rdor (Brag-gdoṅ); W. Tailing, New World Press, ISBN 978-7-80005-072-5
- I︠U︡sov, B. V. (1959), Physical Geography of Tibet, U.S. Joint Publications Research Service
