= Ngari Prefecture =

Prefecture of Tibet Autonomous Region, China

Coordinates: 32.49°N 80.10°E

Ngari Prefecture 阿里地区 · མངའ་རིས་ས་ཁུལ། Ali Prefecture
- Prefecture
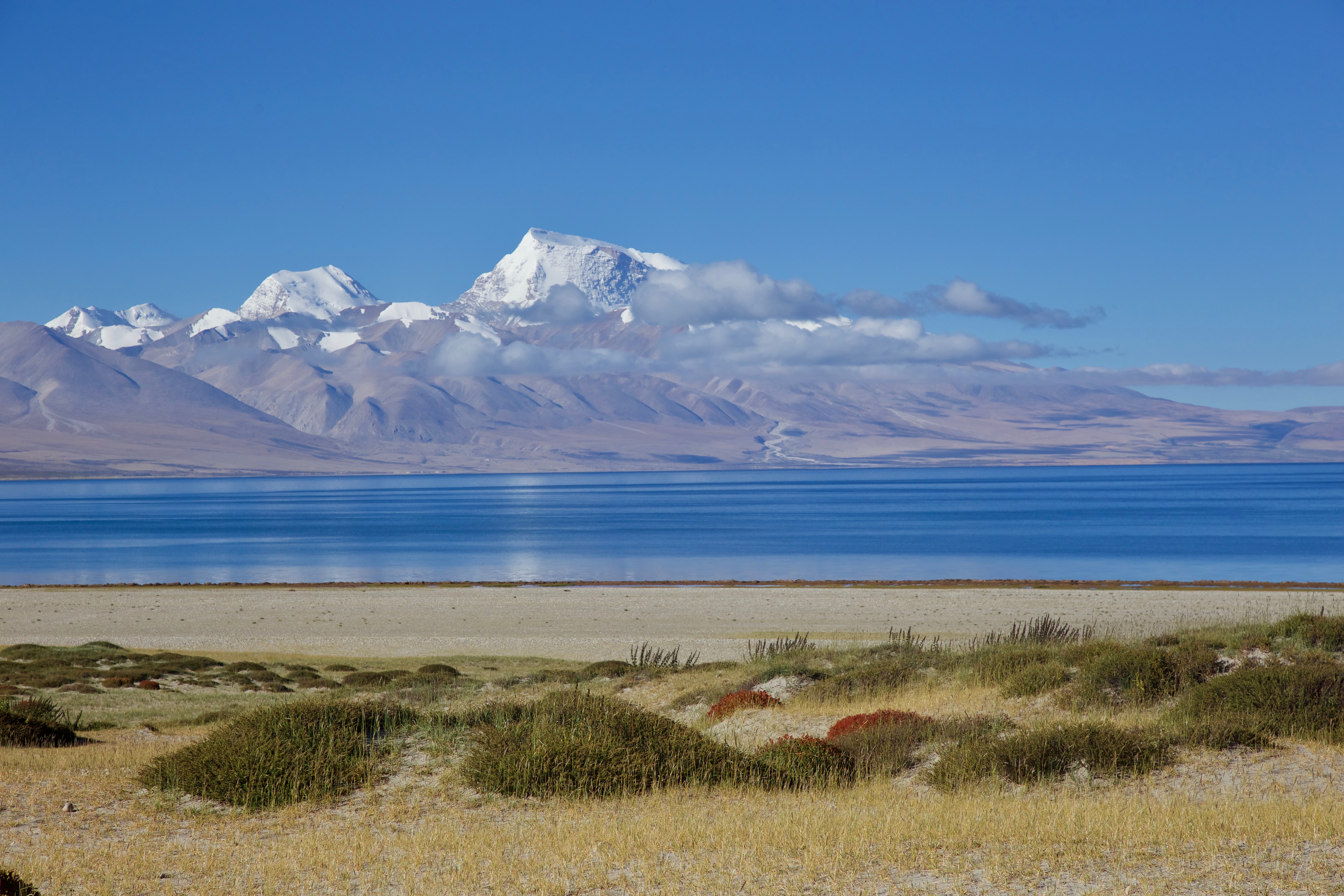
- Lake Manasarovar and Mount Naimona'nyi

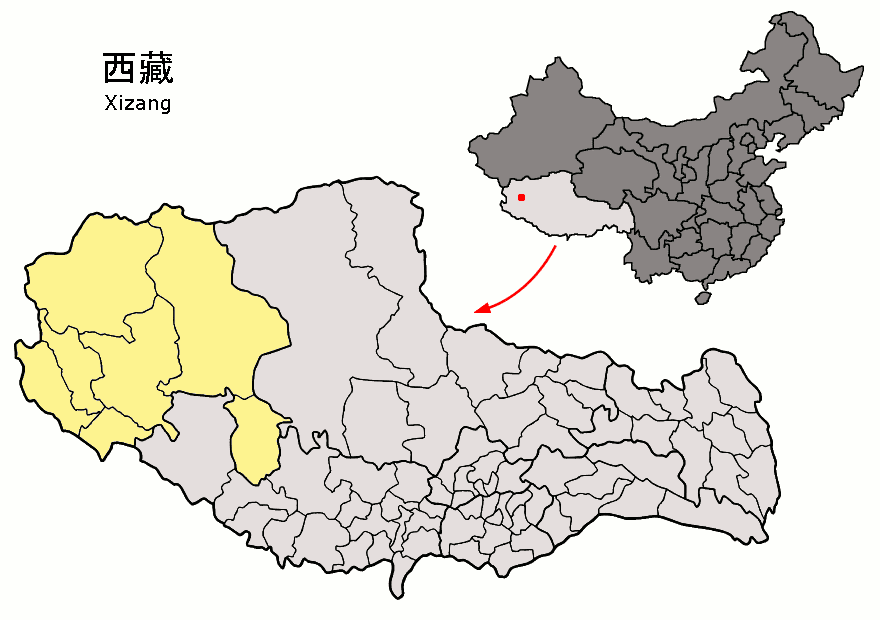
- Location of Ngari Prefecture within China
- Country: People's Republic of China
- Autonomous region: Tibet
- Prefecture seat: Shiquanhe, Gar County

Area
  - Total: 304,683 km^{2} (117,639 sq mi)

Population (2020)
  - Total: 123,281
  - Density: 0.404621/km^{2} (1.04796/sq mi)

GDP
  - Total: CN¥ 9.14 billion US$ 1.25 billion
  - Per capita: CN¥ 74,000; US$ 10,000
- Time zone: UTC+8 (China Standard)
- ISO 3166 code: CN-XJ-25
- Website: Ngari (Ali) Prefecture Administrative Office

Ngari Prefecture (Tibetan: མངའ་རིས་ས་ཁུལ།, Wylie: mnga' ris sa khul, ZWPY: ngari sakü) or Ali Prefecture (simplified Chinese: 阿里地区; traditional Chinese: 阿里地區; pinyin: Ālǐ Dìqū) is a prefecture of China's Tibet Autonomous Region covering Western Tibet, whose traditional name is Ngari Khorsum. Its administrative centre and largest settlement is the town of Shiquanhe. It is one of the least densely populated areas in the world, with 0.4 people per square kilometer (1.0 per square mile).

== History ==
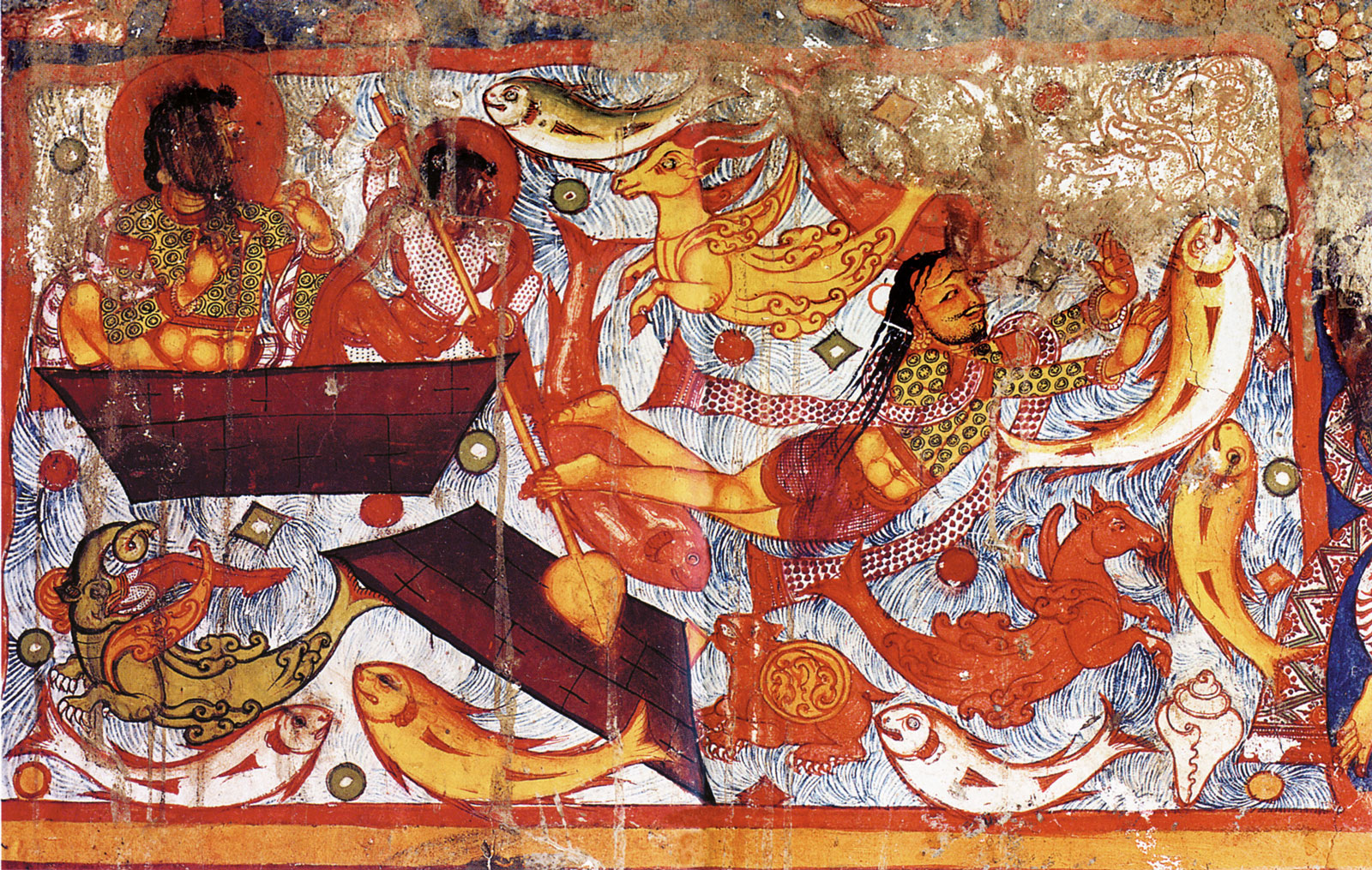
Painting of Avalokitesvara and a fisherman in a storm, Tholing Monastery, 11th century

In ancient times, Ngari was known as Zhangzhung. The Zhangzhung kingdom extended over much of western Tibet, until its conquest by the Tibetan Empire under Songtsen Gampo. Zhangzhung sites, such as its capital Khyung-lung dngul-mkhar, are traditionally believed to be closely associated with the development of Bon, the indigenous Tibetan religion. According to Bon tradition, the religion first spread to Zhangzhung from the semi-mythical lands of Olmo Lungring and Tagzig. Thereafter, Bon doctrines were transmitted to central Tibet. Archaeological evidence demonstrated a highly distinctive cultural tradition in the prehistoric era.

In the mid-7th century, the Tibetan Empire annexed Zhangzhung and expanded its system of administrative divisions known as Tongde to western Tibet. Tibetan militias were deployed in newly established military garrisons, as Classical Tibetan became widely used across the region.

The name "Ngari" (mnga' ris), meaning "domain", arose during the Tibetan Era of Fragmentation. The Tibetan Empire fell to a civil war between rival heirs of the Yarlung dynasty in the 840s. In 925, Kyide Nyimagon, a descendant of the last emperor, founded the kingdom of Ngari Khorsum ("three divisions of Ngari"). At the time, his kingdom encompassed both present-day Ngari and Ladakh. After Kyide Nyimagon's death, the kingdom was divided into three, namely Purang-Guge, Maryul (later known as Ladakh) and Zanskar. Guge was the early center of the Second Diffusion of Buddhism into Tibet. In 988, the Guge king Songne abdicated to become a monk and took the name Yeshe-Ö. He founded the Tholing Monastery, which became the center of Tibetan Buddhist translation. At Tholing, the translator Rinchen Zangpo started the New Tantra Tradition School and initiated a major period of monastery building. In 1072, Purang and Guge were further split as two separate kingdoms. Purang was closely tied to the kingdom of Yatse, which was founded in the Himalayan regions to the south. The Kagyu sect became active in Guge in the late 12th century and Mount Kailash came to be a major pilgrimage destination, especially among followers of Milarepa.

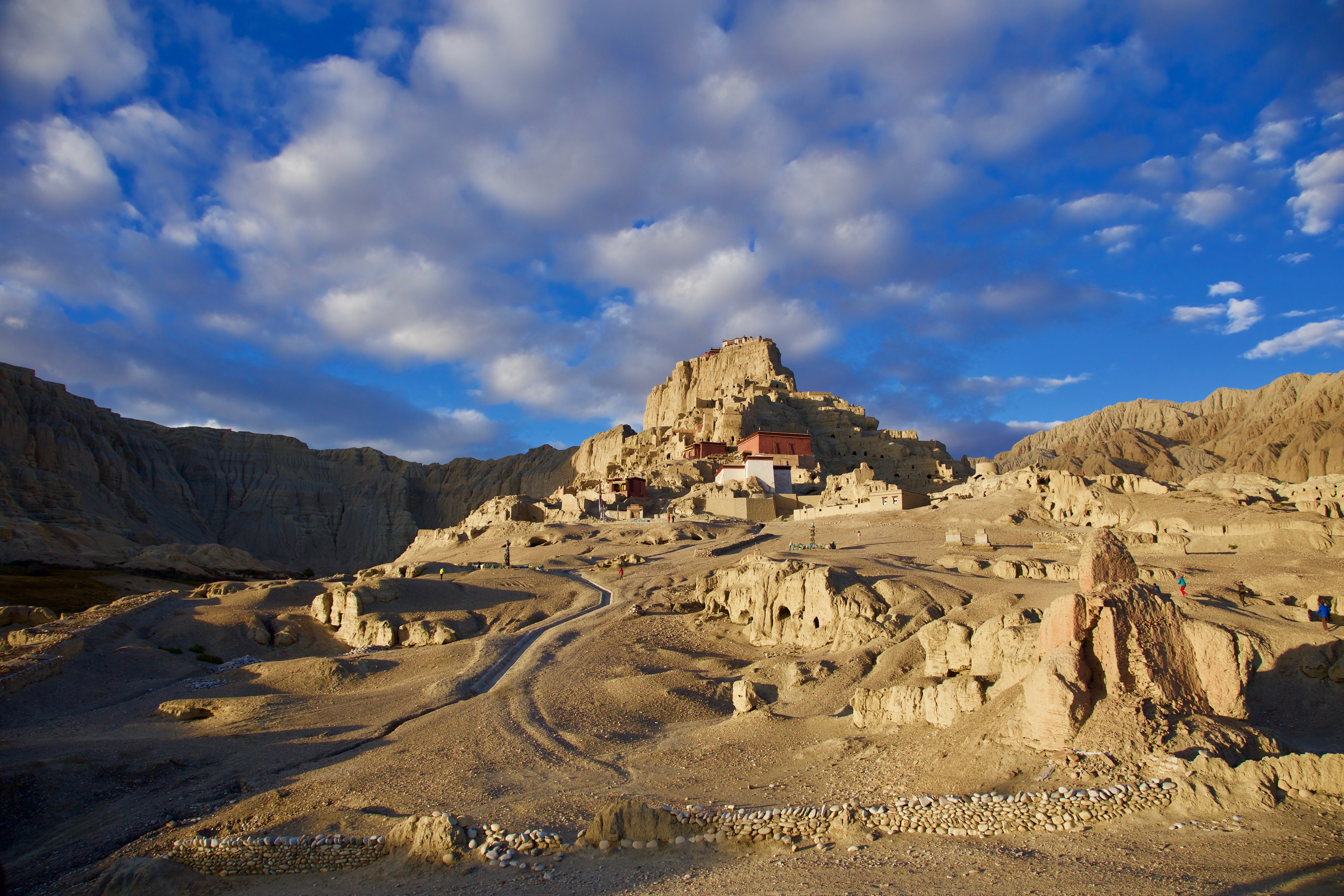
Ruins of Tsaparang, the capital of Guge

Under Mongol rule, the Mangyul Gungthang kingdom rose to dominance from Lower Ngari. Backed by the Sakyapa, it defeated Purang/Yatse in 1252–1253, received direct recognition from the Mongols and held much power over Ngari. Gungtang suffered as the Yuan dynasty fell, while Purang changed hands multiple times towards the end of the 14th century. Around the same time, the Purang/Yatse polity collapsed and came under Guge rule.

Ngari entered a long period of decline starting in the late 14th century, possibly due to reduced precipitation over the region. No new monastery was constructed in Ngari's core region after 1500. The Gelug spread from central Tibet into Ngari from the 15th century onward, and gained the support of the Guge kings. Sectarian conflicts intensified between the Gelug and the Kagyu, which enjoyed the support of Ladakh. During this period, Ladakh steadily expanded and eventually managed to completely conquer Guge in 1630.

In the 1680s, as Ladakh allied with Bhutan, which adhered to the Drukpa Kagyu sect, in the latter's disputes with Tibet, the Ganden Podrang government of Tibet launched an expedition into Ngari. Led by general Ganden Tsewang, the force of Tibetan and Mongol cavalry was victorious at Purang, Rutog and the Ladakhi capital Leh, thus bringing Ngari under the control of central Tibet.

The Ganden Podrang appointed governors known as Garpöns to administer Ngari, who headquartered in Gartok. The region was divided into four Dzongs (Purang, Tsaparang, Daba and Rutog) and six Pöns. The former were headed by appointed officials while the latter were granted to local noble families. The name "Ngari Khorsum" was reinterpreted to mean Purang, Guge and Rutog, reflecting a much reduced extent of Ngari. In 1841, the Dogras invaded Ngari after having successfully conquered Baltistan and Ladakh. After more than a year of fighting in both Ngari and Ladakh, the war ended with the Treaty of Chushul, which restored the status quo.

In 1951, the Chinese People's Liberation Army entered Gartok. The Garpön government was disbanded in 1959 and the Ngari Prefecture was established a year later. In 1963, Zhongba County, formerly part of Ngari, was transferred to the Shigatse Prefecture. From 1970 to 1979, Ngari was administered by the Xinjiang Uyghur Autonomous Region. The prefecture was returned to the Tibet Autonomous Region in 1980. However, the Xinjiang Military District retained its jurisdiction over military affairs in Ngari.

The prefecture has close cultural links with Ladakh, the Kinnaur and Lahaul and Spiti districts of the bordering Indian state of Himachal Pradesh, as well as the Mustang district of Nepal.

== Geography and climate ==
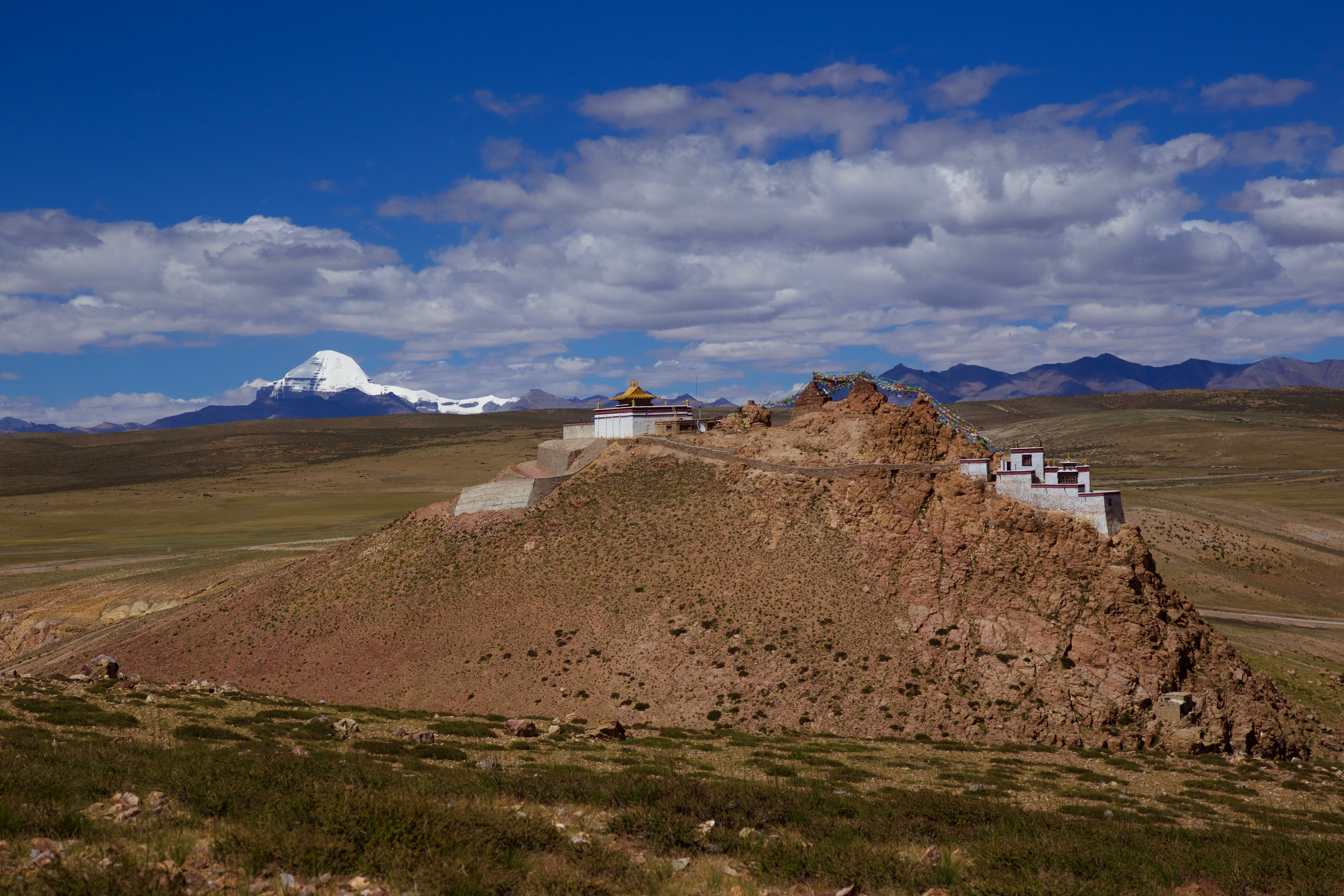
Chiu Monastery by Lake Manasarovar, with Mount Kailash in the background

Four major mountain ranges stretch across Ngari, namely the Himalayas, the Gangdise, the Karakoram, and the Kunlun. Ngari can be divided into three geographical regions, with the elevation increasing from south to north. Northern Ngari forms part of the arid, mostly uninhabited Changtang plateau, where many saline lakes can be found among the high-altitude endorheic basins. The central parts of Ngari consist of wide valleys of rivers such as the Sengge Zangbo (Indus). In the south, rivers flowing towards the Himalayas cut deep gorges through the landscape.

Ngari is best known for Mount Kailash and Lake Manasarovar. Four major rivers originate from the area around the holy mountain and lake. The Sengge Zangbo ("Lion River"), which originates to the north of Mount Kailash, is the source of the Indus. The Langqen Zangbo ("Elephant River") flows westward through the core of the historical kingdom of Guge, and becomes the Sutlej, a major tributary of the Indus. The Damqog Zangbo ("Horse River") forms the upper reaches of the Yarlung Zangbo (Brahmaputra) in the east. The Mabja Zangbo ("Peacock River") runs south from Purang, and is known as the Karnali after crossing the Himalayas.

Mount Kailash is 6,714 m (22,028 ft) above sea level and is a main peak of the Gangdise range (also called the Kailash Range), part of the Transhimalayas. The holy mountain and lake are associated with number of religions: Buddhism, Hinduism, and Bon, among others, attracting numerous domestic and international religious pilgrims and tourists. Surrounding Mount Kailash are four ancient and famous monasteries: Zhabura, Chiu Gompa, Zheri and Zhozhub. Manasarovar lies 4,588 m (15,052 ft) above sea level, covers an area of 412 km^{2} (159 sq mi) and reaches a maximum depth of 70 m (230 ft).

Ngari has a cold desert climate (Köppen climate classification: BWk), with strong dry-winter subarctic climate tendencies (Köppen climate classification: Dwc).

Climate data for Shiquanhe, elevation 4,279 m (14,039 ft), (1991–2020 normals)
Month	Jan	Feb	Mar	Apr	May	Jun	Jul	Aug	Sep	Oct	Nov	Dec	Year
Record high °C (°F)	6.4 (43.5)	9.5 (49.1)	14.5 (58.1)	15.7 (60.3)	20.5 (68.9)	25.2 (77.4)	32.1 (89.8)	26.4 (79.5)	23.7 (74.7)	16.7 (62.1)	12.7 (54.9)	7.1 (44.8)	32.1 (89.8)
Mean daily maximum °C (°F)	−4.0 (24.8)	−1.8 (28.8)	2.7 (36.9)	8.1 (46.6)	13.0 (55.4)	18.5 (65.3)	22.0 (71.6)	20.8 (69.4)	16.8 (62.2)	8.8 (47.8)	3.6 (38.5)	−0.6 (30.9)	9.0 (48.2)
Daily mean °C (°F)	−11.7 (10.9)	−9.0 (15.8)	−4.4 (24.1)	0.9 (33.6)	5.7 (42.3)	11.3 (52.3)	15.0 (59.0)	14.2 (57.6)	9.9 (49.8)	1.3 (34.3)	−4.7 (23.5)	−9.0 (15.8)	1.6 (34.9)
Mean daily minimum °C (°F)	−19.3 (−2.7)	−16.6 (2.1)	−12.3 (9.9)	−7.0 (19.4)	−2.0 (28.4)	4.1 (39.4)	8.5 (47.3)	8.1 (46.6)	2.8 (37.0)	−7.0 (19.4)	−13.0 (8.6)	−17.1 (1.2)	−5.9 (21.4)
Record low °C (°F)	−36.7 (−34.1)	−30.2 (−22.4)	−25.3 (−13.5)	−17.9 (−0.2)	−11.2 (11.8)	−6.6 (20.1)	−0.6 (30.9)	−0.4 (31.3)	−10.0 (14.0)	−17.0 (1.4)	−23.5 (−10.3)	−32.9 (−27.2)	−36.7 (−34.1)
Average precipitation mm (inches)	1.6 (0.06)	1.7 (0.07)	1.1 (0.04)	1.3 (0.05)	2.9 (0.11)	5.8 (0.23)	22.9 (0.90)	25.3 (1.00)	5.5 (0.22)	1.7 (0.07)	0.2 (0.01)	0.6 (0.02)	70.6 (2.78)
Average precipitation days (≥ 0.1 mm)	1.8	2.0	1.3	0.9	2.0	2.8	7.0	8.7	3.1	0.7	0.4	0.6	31.3
Average snowy days	3.9	4.3	3.6	3.5	4.8	2.1	0.1	0.3	1.0	1.4	1.0	1.6	27.6
Average relative humidity (%)	34	33	29	27	28	30	37	42	34	24	24	26	31
Mean monthly sunshine hours	250.1	241.3	299.1	304.9	332.8	333.6	309.9	289.9	299.7	311.1	274.7	262.6	3,509.7
Percentage possible sunshine	78	77	80	78	77	78	72	71	82	90	88	85	80
Source: China Meteorological Administration all-time extreme temperature

== Subdivisions ==
Ngari Prefecture is subdivided into seven counties.

#	Name	Chinese (S)	Hanyu Pinyin	Tibetan	Wylie	Tibetan pinyin	Population (2020 Census)	Area (km^{2})	Density (/km^{2})
1	Gar County	噶尔县	Gá'ěr Xiàn	སྒར་རྫོང་།	sgar rdzong	Gar Zong	31,052	17,669	1.75
2	Burang County	普兰县	Pǔlán Xiàn	སྤུ་ཧྲེང་རྫོང་།	spu hreng rdzong	Burang Zong	12,242	12,539	0.98
3	Zanda County	札达县	Zhádá Xiàn	རྩ་མདའ་རྫོང་།	rtsa mda' rdzong	Zanda Zong	8,454	18,083	0.47
4	Rutog County	日土县	Rìtǔ Xiàn	རུ་ཐོག་རྫོང་།	ru thog rdzong	Rutog Zong	11,167	77,096	0.15
5	Gê'gyai County	革吉县	Géjí Xiàn	དགེ་རྒྱས་རྫོང་།	dge rgyas rdzong	Gê'gyai Zong	18,012	46,117	0.39
6	Gêrzê County	改则县	Gǎizé Xiàn	སྒེར་རྩེ་རྫོང་།	sger rtse rdzong	Gêrzê Zong	25,327	135,025	0.19
7	Coqên County	措勤县	Cuòqín Xiàn	མཚོ་ཆེན་རྫོང་།	mtsho chen rdzong	Coqên Zong	17,027	22,980	0.74

== Transportation ==
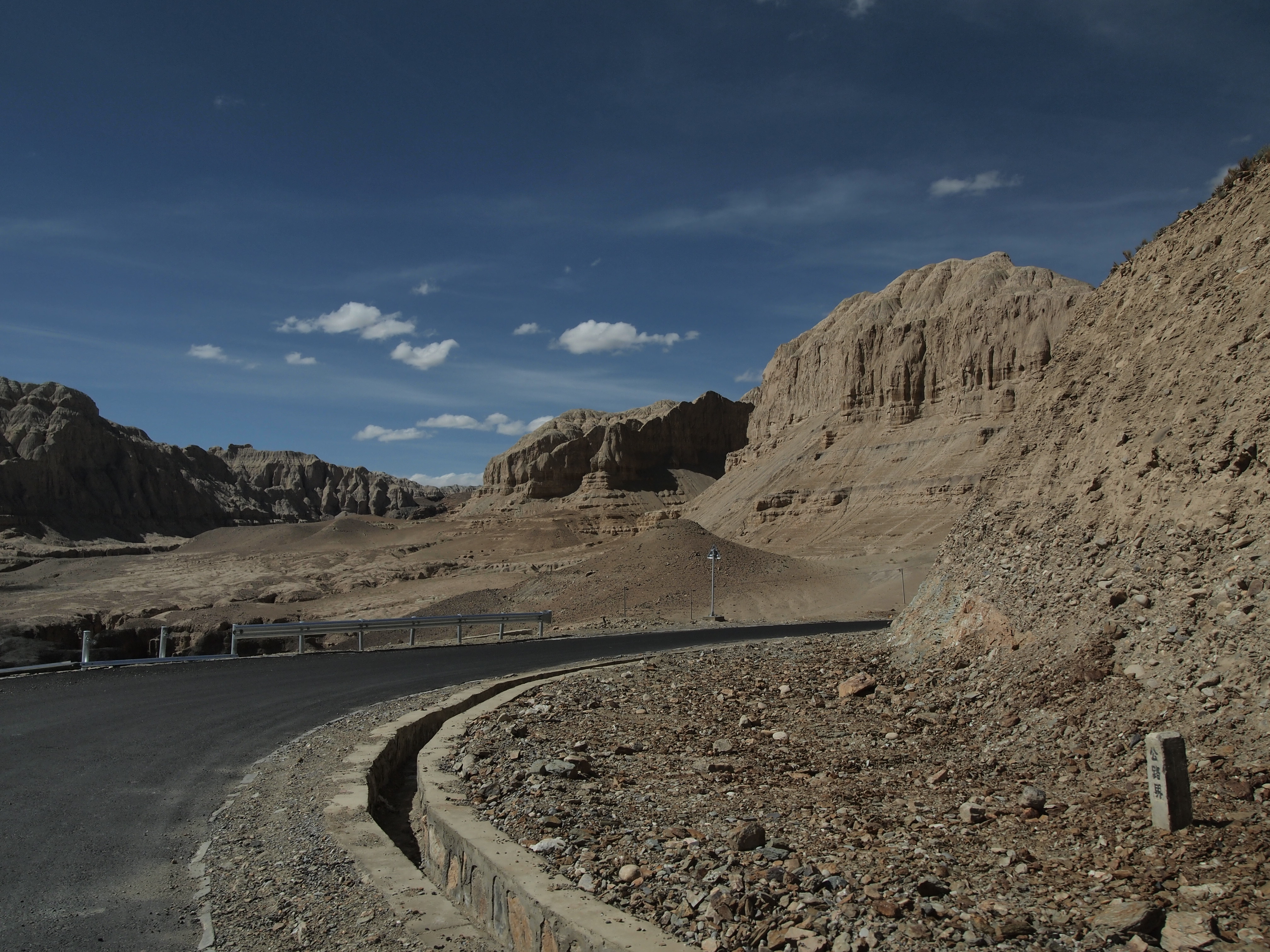
A road in Zanda County

The paved Xinjiang-Tibet Highway (新藏公路, G219) is the main transportation line through Ngari. The 2,143-kilometre (1,332 mi) long highway runs from Kargilik, Xinjiang to Lhatse County in central Tibet, where it meets the China–Nepal Highway. The section between Kargilik and Gartok was completed in 1957. At the time, it was the only gravel road into Ngari and the highest road in the world. The highway was subsequently extended eastward to Purang and Lhatse. Most of the road's Ngari section is located in uninhabited land at an average altitude of more than 4,500 metres (14,800 ft). More than 1,000 soldiers of the People's Liberation Army died during the highway's construction due to altitude sickness and avalanches. The Xinjiang-Tibet Highway was completely paved from 2010 to 2012. In the present day, the majority of passengers and goods from Ngari are transported through the Xinjiang-Tibet Highway to China's railway network in southern Xinjiang.

Ngari Gunsa Airport began operations on 1 July 2010, becoming the fourth civil airport in Tibet (shortening the trip to Lhasa to one-and-a-half hours from three or four days by car) after Lhasa Gonggar Airport, Qamdo Bamda Airport and Nyingchi Mainling Airport.

== See also ==
- Winter storms of 2009–2010 in East Asia
- Tibet
- Himalayas
- 2020 China–India skirmishes
