= Diwan Hari Chand =

Indian general (died 1857)

- Died: 1857
- Cause of death: Cholera
- Allegiance: Sikh Empire; Jammu and Kashmir (princely state)
- Known for: Treaty of Chushul
- Battles / wars: Dogra–Tibetan War; Siege of Leh; Battle of Chushul; Second Anglo-Sikh War; Indian Rebellion of 1857; Siege of Delhi (1857) #

Diwan Hari Chand (died 1857) was a Khatri general from the prominent family of the Dewans of Eminabad, who were chiefs in service of Maharaja Gulab Singh of Jammu. Hari Chand's military leadership secured Dogra rule across the western Himalayas. In 1842 he marshaled an army that lifted the siege of Leh, routed the Tibetans at Tangtse and Chushul, and negotiated the Treaty of Chushul, which firmly established Ladakh under Gulab Singh’s suzerainty. Over the next decade he defended the frontiers of the newly formed princely state of Jammu & Kashmir—quelling rebellions in Hazara, Gilgit and Chilas. In 1857 he led the Jammu contingent at the Siege of Delhi, where he succumbed to cholera. Hari Chand remains one of the foremost military architects of mid-19th-century Dogra expansion.

== Early life ==
Diwan Hari Chand was born into a prominent Khatri family in the early 19th century. He was the second son of Diwan Amir Chand, who had served as the chief minister (Madar-ul-Maham) to Raja Gulab Singh of Jammu. Raised in an environment of administration and warfare, young Hari Chand was groomed for public service. By 1836, Maharaja Gulab Singh, then a vassal of the Sikh Empire, entrusted Hari Chand with command of the Jammu troops. This appointment marked the start of Hari Chand’s rise to prominence. He would spend the next two decades as one of Gulab Singh’s most trusted generals, playing a key role in expanding and consolidating Dogra rule.

== Military career ==
In 1840–1841, Hari Chand was deputed by Gulab Singh to subdue the restive Khari and Khariali districts in the Jammu region. He first besieged Sarai Aurangabad, which was then being held by the troops of Maharaja Kharak Singh, and captured it. Hari Chand then went to Qila Sukhchainpur, where Surat Singh, a loyalist of the Maharaja, conceded the fort. Meanwhile, 100 soldiers sent to besiege Kot Qandhari fort had succeeded in occupying it. Hari Chand then proceeded towards Mangla Fort, a fort which was difficult to take because of its construction and surroundings. He asked Rai Dhanpat, the defender of the fort, to surrender but the latter refused. The Diwan then besieged the fort and participated in the skirmishing, where seven soldiers of his and 23 opponents died. The defenders retreated to the fort, while the besiegers plundered the nearby tower and burnt it.

Hari Chand then had breastworks built which surrounded the fort on all four directions. He deployed his commanders at different locations around the fort. (Note: Bhag Singh Major and Ram Singh Jamadar were deployed to the west of the fort at Aran village. To the east of the fort at Deorhi Khari (Khari Gate), a cavalry unit was stationed. At the north end of the fort, where Deorhi Aran (Aran Gate) leads to a spring, Lala Ganda-Mal Kardar of Mirpur was deputed. To the east, at the top of the Mound, Hazura Singh Thanadar and Murtaza Khan Malkana were deployed with a brass cannon.) Fighting continued for 15 days with many attempts made to breach the fort. Then a contingent put up ladders and pushed their breastworks towards the fort walls. The defenders were using the bastion near a spring as their day outpost, and would take water from there for the night outpost. One of the commanders attacked this bastion and burnt it to cut off the defenders' water supply. The defenders were offered safe passage if they would surrender, and they finally did. Hari Chand awarded 50,000 rupees (equivalent to ₹32,102,426 in 2023) to the soldiers and promoted many officers. Maharaja Gulab Singh endowed Diwan Hari Chand with many unspecified awards after the victory.

By the early 1840s, Diwan Hari Chand had become central to Gulab Singh’s military endeavors, often leading expeditions at the frontiers of the expanding Dogra domain. His responsibilities grew as the Dogra kingdom pushed its boundaries northwards into the Himalayas and westwards towards the Indus, reaching as far as Chilas and Yasin in Dardistan. Hari Chand’s early exploits set the stage for his most famous campaign: the conquest of Ladakh during the Dogra–Tibetan war and the defense of this remote high-altitude region against Tibetan intervention.

== Conquest of Ladakh ==
=== Background ===
Ladakh, a Himalayan kingdom, first came under Dogra attack in 1834 when General Zorawar Singh – another of Gulab Singh’s commanders – led a force to invade the country. After fierce fighting over several years, Zorawar Singh subdued Ladakh, and by 1840 the territory was annexed to the Sikh Empire under Raja Gulab Singh. The Ladakhi Namgyal dynasty’s king was deposed or reduced to a vassal, and the Dogras imposed tribute and suzerainty over the region. However, Ladakh’s subjugation remained tenuous; local revolts erupted frequently and were suppressed by Zorawar Singh in successive expeditions up to 1840.

In 1841, sensing an opportunity, Zorawar Singh pressed beyond Ladakh into western Tibet (Ngari province), aiming to extend Dogra control over the lucrative trans-Himalayan trade. This bold incursion provoked a strong Tibetan (Qing Chinese) response. Zorawar Singh was met by superior forces near Mansarovar and was killed in battle on 12 December 1841, in the midst of a harsh winter storm. His death led to a dramatic reversal: the Dogra garrisons in Tibet and Ladakh were weakened, and a combined Tibetan-Ladakhi counterattack swiftly materialized. By early 1842, the Tibetans, joined by rebelling Ladakhi nobles, advanced into Ladakh, recapturing territory and even threatening Leh, the capital. Contemporary accounts note a Sino-Tibetan army had laid siege to Leh, determined to reclaim Ladakh and add it to the Qing dominions.

=== Hari Chand's Campaign of 1842 ===
Upon learning of the disaster, Gulab Singh – who was away assisting the British in the First Anglo-Afghan War – acted decisively to retrieve the situation. He dispatched Diwan Hari Chand, then stationed in the Hazara region, to lead a relief army to Ladakh. At this time, Hari Chand was fighting against the Hakim of Darband along the Attock river to recapture the fort of Amb. The Purabiya battalion serving Maharaja Sher Singh relieved the Diwan. Hari Chand met Raja Gulab Singh at Balakot and received approval for his Ladakh campaign. Hari Chand hurried north from Hasan Abdal and reached Haripur within one day and night of marching. From there, he traveled with Raja Dhian Singh to Jammu. After five or six days, Hari Chand left Jammu and arrived at Mirpur, where he stayed for 15 days while the troops were being armed. He had a total of 6,000 soldiers. They departed from Mirpur and arrived at Uri in Kashmir valley, where they were hosted for 15 days by the Nazim of the area.

=== Battle of Kargil Fort ===
Hari Chand was accompanied by Wazir Ratnu, who left for Ladakh one day before the Diwan. Hari Chand travelled via Ganderbal and Gagangir to Sonamarg within six days. From there, he marched via Dras to Kargil. When he arrived in Kargil, he was informed about the ongoing siege of Kargil Fort, where two siege towers had been erected to close the road. Hari Chand sent 3,000 soldiers and a cannon there by way of Kohi fort, and his remaining forces deployed in front of the siege towers. The fort had been besieged by Bahadur Khan. Hari Chand's soldiers fired their muskets and zamburaks at the besiegers. The besieged soldiers inside the fort also arrived and the three contingents were now fighting together. The fighting continued for six hours, and then the three groups launched a coordinated attack. 200 enemy soldiers died and 4,000 of them drowned while trying to cross the Suru river. The two siege towers were burnt and 20 rupees each were awarded to the soldiers.

After leaving Kargil fort, the Diwan's army skirmished with two enemy commanders with some success. After a few days, the army reached the town of Khalatse located on the Indus River. The opposing forces had demolished the bridge on the river, so a new bridge was built. Because the riverbank wasn't broad enough for the large army to cross, it was split into two parts. One contingent under Wazir Ratnu marched along the river towards Bazgoo, the other crossed the mountains to reach the same town. The two groups regrouped at Thasgam, where an enemy army approached them but then withdrew. The army then reached Leh, and their approach made the Tibetans lift the siege of Leh. The defending commanders were awarded 500 rupees each, while injured soldiers were awarded 20 rupees each. After six days, 1,000 soldiers led by Jawahir Singh were sent towards Zanskar; and 500 soldiers led by Naraina were sent towards Nubra.

Upon hearing this news, 1,000 Tibetan soldiers were dispatched towards Leh. Pushed back after a skirmish, this group sheltered at a gompa. The Diwan left Leh with all of his army, except one platoon, and moved towards this location. Two days later, he besieged the gompa. Cannon fire continuously targeted the gompa, and the nearby stream used to source water was cut off. After four days, the defenders surrendered. Wazir Ratnu took them to Ladakh, while Hari Chand stayed at the gompa for four days to restore the local inhabitants, then left for Leh. During a later battle, 100 Tibetan soldiers were killed and 400 were captured. A few of them fled to their commanders, who then marched with 5,000 soldiers and a cannon, and encamped 30 miles (48 km) from Leh. The Diwan dispatched his commanders towards their position. His army, except 100 soldiers left behind to defend the city, marched 25 miles (40 km) and arrived opposite this position. The Tibetans made a night attack but were beaten back and sheltered in a new camp.

The Diwan's forces besieged the new camp and fighting continued for eight days, till 300 soldiers and a commander were killed by enemy gunfire. The besiegers panicked, but they were reassured by the Diwan and resumed their siege. Four days later, the Diwan noticed a stream flowing into the camp and had it flooded. The new camp was located at Tangtse, on the western end of Pangong Lake. The Tibetans had 3,000 soldiers, but their camp and trenches had been flooded. The besieged soldiers abandoned their camp. Their commander was beheaded in retaliation for Zorawar Singh's death. The other enemy commanders were captured, their weapons were taken but the soldiers were set free. The Diwan left for Leh while Wazir Ratnu accompanied the captured Tibetan commanders. The Battle of Chushul was fought sometime after 10 August in Chushul, which was the final battle of the war.

Contemporary Sikh and Ladakhi chronicles laud Hari Chand’s leadership in this campaign. One account records Diwan Hari Chand had reconquered the whole of Ladakh, driving the Tibetans back “in the direction of Shyok” and destroying the last enemy detachment at Drangtse. By the end of summer 1842, Ladakh was securely back in Dogra hands, largely due to Hari Chand’s resolute generalship.

=== Treaty of Chushul ===
Following the Dogra victory, both sides were exhausted and sought to end the conflict. In September 1842, a formal peace was negotiated, culminating in the Treaty of Chushul (also known as the Ladakh–Tibet Treaty of 1842). Diwan Hari Chand acted as the chief Dogra envoy – the Muktar-ud-Daula or plenipotentiary – representing Maharaja Gulab Singh and the Sikh Darbar. Alongside him was Wazir Ratnu, another Dogra commander. The Tibetan signatories were Kalon Surkhang, a minister from Lhasa, and Dapon (General) Peshi Shatra, representing the Ganden Phodrang government of Tibet. The treaty was solemnized on 16/17 September 1842 by an exchange of oaths and vows of friendship.

Under the terms of the Treaty of Chushul, both sides essentially agreed to a status quo ante bellum and affirmed non-aggression in the future. Tibet recognized Ladakh as part of Gulab Singh’s dominions (and thus under Sikh suzerainty), formally acknowledging Dogra control over Ladakh. In turn, Gulab Singh and the Lahore Darbar renounced any further claims to Tibetan territory, agreeing to respect the “ancient established frontiers” between Ladakh and Tibet. Both parties promised neither would interfere in the other’s boundaries henceforth. The treaty also restored the traditional trading and tribute relations prevalent before the war: it was agreed the age-old Lopchak missions (biennial tribute and goodwill delegations from Ladakh to Lhasa) would continue uninterrupted, and traders from Ladakh and Tibet could travel and conduct commerce as before, with no hindrance or new taxes. Essentially, the treaty reaffirmed the 1684 Treaty of Tingmosgang arrangements, maintaining peace and commerce across the border.

Diwan Hari Chand’s role in securing this pact was pivotal. As the Dogra signatory, he ensured a favorable settlement that cemented Dogra gains while avoiding further escalation with the Qing Empire. The Ladakh Chronicles and Sikh records actually note the “Tibetan treaty bears his name,” underscoring the extent to which Hari Chand was identified with this historic accord. The Treaty of Chushul brought a close to the brief but intense Dogra–Tibetan war. It would keep the peace on the Ladakh-Tibet frontier for the remainder of the 19th century, and stands as a testament to Hari Chand’s diplomatic as well as military acumen.

== Later career ==
Hari Chand was deployed at Shahdara Bagh in Lahore to help Raja Hira Singh when the latter's office of prime minister of the Sikh Empire was threatened. Hari Chand then went to Sialkot to assist Hira Singh in its conquest from Prince Pashaura Singh. The duo managed to capture the city after two months. Hari Chand returned to Shahdara Bagh, but he was called back to Jammu after relations between Gulab Singh and Hira Singh became strained. He mobilized new troops and bolstered the kingdom’s defences to protect it from campaigns by Hira Singh. However, Hira Singh was killed during an uprising in Lahore in 1844.

After the Ladakh campaign, Hari Chand continued to distinguish himself in the service of the Dogra state. In March 1846, the First Anglo-Sikh War ended with the British victory and the Treaty of Amritsar, which made Gulab Singh the independent Maharaja of Jammu & Kashmir. Diwan Hari Chand remained one of the new kingdom’s foremost generals, responsible for defending and stabilizing its far-flung frontiers.

During the turbulent interlude of late 1845, as the Sikh Empire began to crumble, the Lahore Darbar’s forces turned against Gulab Singh. Hari Chand, who was in Dinga at the time along with his unit of sowars, put down nearby rebellions and set fire to the lands of the rebels. The Diwan was then summoned to Jammu by the Maharaja. A large Sikh army under Raja Lal Singh and Sardar Sham Singh Attariwala besieged Jammu in December 1845, suspecting Gulab Singh of disloyalty. Hari Chand was entrusted with command of all Dogra defensive forces and the protection of Jammu city. He met the invaders in a pitched battle on the plains of Satwari outside Jammu. Hari Chand and his brother Diwan Nihal Chand repulsed the Sikh attack at Satwari, successfully defending the city and forcing the besiegers to withdraw. Contemporary accounts credit his decisive leadership for saving Jammu at this critical hour.

Following this, when Gulab Singh traveled to Lahore to negotiate with the British and Sikh Regency, he left Hari Chand in charge of Jammu’s affairs. He then suppressed a revolt by the town of Deva Batala. Hari Chand later went to Lahore with Gulab Singh to carry out negotiations with the British as representatives of the Lahore Court. In the ensuing years, Diwan Hari Chand was heavily involved in consolidating the new Kingdom of Jammu and Kashmir. In late 1846 and 1847, unrest broke out among tribes on the western borders, particularly in Hazara and the Punjab hills that had come under Gulab Singh’s rule. Hari Chand led many campaigns to quell these tribal uprisings. He achieved notable success in pacifying the Hazara region, restoring order by early 1847. However, his conquests in the Hazara region was exchanged for areas closer to Jammu. His efforts in Hazara were commended by British officials Major General Sir Walter Raleigh Gilbert, and later Sir Henry Lawrence. Sir Hugh Wheeler, the commander of British troops in Punjab, praised Hari Chand before Lord Dalhousie. Wheeler acknowledged that without Hari Chand’s timely assistance, the British forces would have struggled to cross the Jhelum river and suppress the hill tribes as efficiently as they did. This praise from erstwhile rivals highlighted Hari Chand’s skill in mountain warfare and cooperation with the British when interests aligned.

In 1846, Hari Chand was deployed in Mirpur to help the British quash a revolt by Chattar Singh Attariwalla. During the Second Anglo-Sikh War, he guarded the Jammu–Punjab border to prevent rebel Sikh forces from infiltrating into Kashmir. He sealed off routes from Mirpur to Akhnoor and even disbanded disaffected Sikh soldiers who tried to take refuge in Dogra territory – actions that helped Gulab Singh stay neutral and secure while Punjab was annexed by the British. After the British annexation of Punjab in 1849, Hari Chand accompanied Gulab Singh to meet the Governor-General, Lord Dalhousie. At this durbar in Wazirabad, the British commanders publicly praised Hari Chand’s contributions, especially his assistance in Hazara and his disciplined management of the frontier.

On the northern frontier, Hari Chand played a crucial role in defending Kashmir’s remote regions of Gilgit-Baltistan. In 1847, the Mir of Hunza and the Raja of Gilgit (Gohr Rahman) rebelled against Dogra authority, plunging Gilgit Agency into chaos. Hari Chand was dispatched with a strong force and swiftly subdued the rebellion, reasserting Dogra control over Gilgit and punishing the recalcitrant chiefs. Only a few years later, in 1851–52, a more serious crisis emerged in Dardistan: the Dard tribes of Chilas and surrounding areas began raiding Dogra outposts. In response, Hari Chand led an arduous expedition into the high Indus valley. The campaign proved difficult – Dogra troops suffered heavy losses besieging the fort of Chilas through the winter of 1851–52. Yet the Diwan’s perseverance prevailed. In the spring of 1852, Hari Chand succeeded in capturing the famous Chilas fort. His victory put an end to the raiding and extended Maharaja Gulab Singh’s writ securely up to the Indus. Around the same time, Hari Chand was also called upon to deal with a rebellious vassal closer to home. He marched to Poonch and captured Trochi Fort, forcing Raja Jawahar Singh of Poonch (a feudatory) to submit to the Maharaja. Through these actions, Hari Chand became the principal enforcer of Dogra authority across the rugged northern frontiers – from the Karakoram down to the Pir Panjal.

The final chapter of Hari Chand’s career came during the Indian Rebellion of 1857 (the Sepoy Mutiny). By then Maharaja Gulab Singh had died, and his son Ranbir Singh was the new ruler. When the British requested aid to quell the rebellion, Jammu and Kashmir dispatched a sizeable contingent to assist. Diwan Hari Chand, despite being in his late 50s or early 60s, personally led the J&K state forces to the siege of Delhi in mid-1857. He commanded a division consisting of four infantry regiments, one cavalry regiment, and a battery of artillery from the Dogra army. The Jammu contingent joined the British forces on the Delhi Ridge fighting against the rebels. Tragically, at the height of the siege, Hari Chand was struck by illness. He contracted cholera in the camp, a common fate in the unsanitary conditions of the besiegers, and died in late 1857 before the fall of Delhi. His death was a significant loss for the Dogra forces – upon hearing the news, Hari Chand’s younger brother Diwan Nihal Chand rushed to Delhi to assume command of the contingent and complete their mission of assistance. Diwan Hari Chand’s remains were laid to rest near Delhi, and he was mourned as a loyal ally by the British and as a great hero by his countrymen.

== Legacy ==
Diwan Hari Chand is remembered as one of the great Dogra generals who helped shape the early history of Jammu and Kashmir. As a career soldier-statesman, he combined the acumen of a minister with the courage of a field commander. His martial accomplishments, often recorded in adulatory terms by chroniclers, secured the frontiers of the Dogra state and left a lasting imprint on the region. Within Jammu and Kashmir, Diwan Hari Chand’s name became synonymous with loyalty and valor. He was a key architect of Gulab Singh’s conquests, instrumental in annexing not only Ladakh but also in holding Gilgit-Baltistan and other tough regions against rebellions. His successful storming of the Chilas fort and suppression of frontier revolts are still recounted in regional histories as feats of daring.

Hari Chand’s legacy also lives on through the administrative lineage of the Dogra court. He was part of a family that produced multiple distinguished Diwans and generals (his brothers Jawala Sahai and Nihal Chand, and later his nephews, would also serve the Jammu and Kashmir state in high positions). This continuity helped institutionalize the governance and military traditions Hari Chand and his contemporaries had established.

== Bibliography ==
- Charak, Sukhdev Singh (1977). English Translation Of The Gulabnama Of Diwan Kirpa Ram, The Persian History Of The Maharaja Gulab Singh (1st ed.). New Delhi, Jammu and Rohtak: Light & Life. OCLC 500547001 – via archive.org.
- Charak, Sukhdev Singh (1985). A Short History Of Jammu State: From The Earliest Times To 1845 AD. Pathankot, Jammu: Ajaya Prakashan. OCLC 14051157 – via Panjab Digital Library.
