= Siege of Leh =

1842 battle between Dogra dynasty and Tibet

- Part of Dogra–Tibetan War
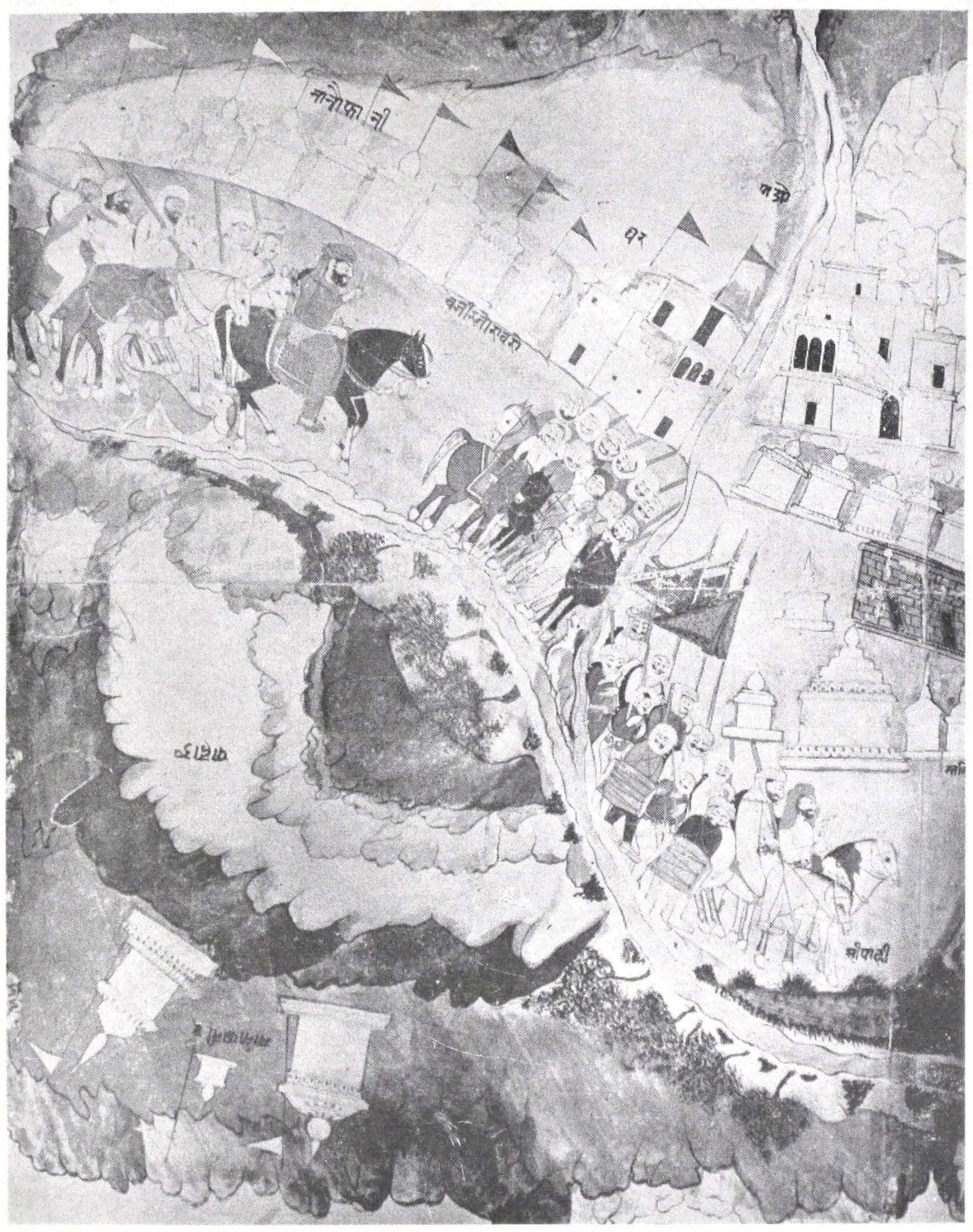
- Zorawar Singh putting down the Ladakhi rebellion in Leh
Date	August 1842
Location	Leh, Ladakh
Result	Dogra victory; Treaty of Chushul; Brutal suppression of Ladakhi rebellion by the Dogras; Hundreds of Buddhist monasteries plundered
Territorial changes	Tibetan forces retreat from Ladakh

Belligerents
Sikh Empire: Dogra dynasty	Qing Empire: Tibet

Commanders and leaders
Unknown	Unknown Tibetan commanders

Strength
2,500 Dogras	Unknown number of Tibetans; ~1,000 Ladakhis

Casualties and losses
Unknown	Heavy
- Thousands of Ladakhis massacred

The Siege of Leh was a significant military engagement that took place in August 1842 between the Dogra dynasty and Tibetan forces allied with the Qing Dynasty. Leh, the capital of Ladakh under the control of Dogras, was besieged by the Tibetan forces after Dogra invasion of Tibet was repulsed. The siege also witnessed a significant Ladakhi uprising against Dogra rule, though it was suppressed brutally by Dogra forces.

== Background ==
Ladakh, strategically located between Tibet and the Indian subcontinent, had long been a region of interest for both Tibetan and Indian rulers. By the early 19th century, the Dogra dynasty of Jammu, under the leadership of Maharaja Gulab Singh, had embarked on a series of military campaigns aimed at expanding its territory. One of the key figures in this expansion was General Zorawar Singh, who had successfully annexed much of Ladakh by 1834.

However, the annexation of Ladakh brought the Dogras into conflict with the Tibetan authorities, who were aligned with the Qing dynasty of China. Tensions escalated after Zorawar Singh's invasion of Tibet in 1841, which was initially successful but later met with fierce Tibetan resistance. In response, Tibetan forces launched a counteroffensive, laying siege to Leh in 1842.

== Ladakhi uprising ==
In addition to the external threat posed by the Tibetan forces, the Dogras faced internal dissent during the siege. Many of the Ladakhi nobles and local population, discontent with Dogra rule, saw the Tibetan invasion as an opportunity to rebel against Dogra control.

The rebels hoped that the Tibetan forces would be able to defeat the Dogras and restore Ladakhi independence. However, the Dogra military, along with reinforcements from Jammu, brutally suppressed the internal revolt and massacred Ladakhi revolters while simultaneously defending against the Tibetan siege.

== Siege ==
In August 1842, Tibetan forces, supported by Qing-aligned troops, launched an offensive against Leh, the capital of Ladakh. The Dogra forces, under the command of Zorawar Singh, were tasked with defending the city. The details of the siege, including the exact number of troops and casualties, remain largely unknown.

== Aftermath ==
The Dogra victory at the siege of Leh solidified their control over Ladakh. However, the broader conflict continued until the Treaty of Chushul was signed in September 1842. Under the terms of this treaty, hostilities between the Dogras and the Tibetans were brought to an end, and a boundary was established between Ladakh and Tibet, which remained in place until the mid-20th century.

The treaty was significant in that it allowed the Dogras to retain control over Ladakh while recognizing Tibetan sovereignty over its own territory. This effectively ended the Dogra–Tibetan War and created a lasting peace in the region.

== See also ==
- Zorawar Singh
- Treaty of Chushul
- Battle of Ladakh
- Ladakh
