= Krishna Mehta =

Indian politician (born 1913)

Member of Parliament, Rajya Sabha
- In office 1962–1968
- Constituency: Jammu and Kashmir

Personal details
- Born: 4 June 1913 Kishtwar, Jammu and Kashmir, British India
- Died: 20 October 1993 (aged 80) Kishtwar, Jammu and Kashmir, India
- Spouse: Duni Chand Mehta
- Children: 6
- Occupation: Social worker, politician
- Known for: First woman MP from Jammu and Kashmir

Krishna Mehta (4 June 1913 – 20 October 1993) was an Indian politician, social worker, and the first woman member of parliament from Jammu and Kashmir. She is known for her contributions to social welfare and rehabilitation efforts in the aftermath of the 1947 Partition, as well as for her work in establishing institutions for disadvantaged women and refugees in Jammu and Kashmir.

== Early life and 1947 Partition ==
Krishna Mehta was born on 4 June 1913 into the prominent Mehta family of Kishtwar in Jammu and Kashmir Princely State. Her great-grandfather, Colonel Mehta Basti Ram, served as a commander under General Zorawar Singh. After the general was killed in battle, Basti Ram survived the ambush that nearly took them both and, moved by loyalty and loss, he devoted his life to honoring his leader’s legacy, turning every campaign into a tribute to his fallen commander. In 1947, Krishna Mehta, who was already married to Duni Chand Mehta and serving as the Wazir-e-Wazarat (District Commissioner) of Muzaffarabad in Jammu and Kashmir, faced a similar tragedy when her husband was killed in the line of duty. Inspired by her great-grandfather’s unwavering resolve, she too chose to honor her husband’s legacy, serving the families of fallen victims with strength and compassion.

=== Founding of Social Welfare Organizations ===
In October 1947, during the tribal invasion of Jammu and Kashmir from the North-West Frontier Province, Krishna Mehta and her six children fled their home as Muzaffarabad came under attack. Her husband was killed while defending the area. Subsequently, she was taken as a prisoner of war by Pakistani authorities and held in Muzaffarabad and later at the Narowal camp, where she witnessed and endured severe hardships. After repatriation, though she had the means to resettle in Kishtwar, she chose instead to remain with the refugees, sharing in their suffering. She dedicated herself to their rehabilitation and offered them emotional support. At the Kurukshetra refugee camp, she met Prime Minister Jawaharlal Nehru, whose encouragement inspired her to establish two institutions dedicated to the welfare of refugees and underprivileged women. In 1949, Mehta established the Gandhi Seva Sadan in Jammu and the Khadi Gram Udyog Sangh in Allahabad, with ₹5,000 allocated for each by the Prime Minister.

True to its title, Munshi Premchand’s novel Seva Sadan centers on the themes of social service and moral redemption. Through the journey of its protagonist, Suman—a woman who transforms her life from one of personal despair to one devoted to the upliftment of other women—the novel explores issues of gender inequality, societal reform, and the transformative power of selfless service. Shri Gandhi Sewa Sadan Jammu, which she considered her as third son focused on providing vocational training and economic support for displaced and disadvantaged women, with the aim of promoting self-reliance.

== Political career ==
In 1962, Mehta was nominated to the Rajya Sabha, the upper house of India's Parliament, becoming the first female MP from Jammu and Kashmir. In this role role, she advocated for social development initiatives and worked to bring national attention to issues in her home state. She invited then-Prime Minister Indira Gandhi to Kishtwar to provide a firsthand understanding of the region’s challenges.

== Later life and death ==
Mehta maintained an interest in spirituality, spending time at the ashram of her guru, Magan Baba, in Kishtwar. She continued her work in social welfare and wrote about her experiences, including the challenges faced in Kashmir. Krishna Mehta died on 20 October 1993, in Kishtwar. In accordance with her wishes, her ashes were immersed in the Chenab River.
