= Basti Ram =

Basti Ram may refer to:

- Bhai Vasti Ram, a Sikh saint
- Mehta Basti Ram, a Dogra official
