= Treaty of Chushul =

1842 treaty between Tibetans and Sikhs

Treaty of Chushul (1842)
- Signed: 17 September 1842 (Assuj 2, 1889 B.S.)
- Location: Ladakh
- Effective: 17 September 1842

Full text
- Treaty of Chushul at Wikisource

The Treaty of Chushul, or the Dogra–Tibetan Treaty of 1842, was a peace treaty signed between the Tibetan government of Ganden Phodrang (then a protectorate of Qing China) and the Dogra Raja Gulab Singh of Jammu, under the suzerainty of the Sikh Empire, following the Dogra–Tibetan war (1841–1842). It was signed in Leh in September 1842 restoring the status quo ante bellum, and respecting the "old established frontiers" between Ladakh and Tibet. The treaty is often referred to as the "Treaty of Chushul", likely due to the last battle of the war taking place near Chushul.

== History ==
Zorawar Singh Kahluria, a Sikh general, who, after the conquest of Ladakh, attempted to extend its boundaries in order to control the trade routes into Ladakh under the leadership of Gulab Singh of Jammu, under the suzerainty of the Sikh Empire. Even though Zorawar Singh's campaign to western Tibet saw some initial successes and temporally occupied parts of Tibet, the campaign suffered a major defeat at Taklakot (Purang) and Zorawar Singh was killed. The Tibetan forces then advanced on Ladakh, but were subsequently defeated by Diwan Hari Chand near Chushul in 1842 who was leading Dogra reinforcements coming from Jammu. At this time both sides decided to negotiate in order to end the Dogra–Tibetan war (also known as the Sino-Sikh war).

On 17 September 1842, the Treaty of Chushul was agreed in Leh between the Dogras led by Hari Chand and the Tibetans, executed by an exchange of notes which embodied the duties given to each other by both parties. Thus, the Kashmir government had taken over the responsibility assumed by the Tibetan and Chinese authorities, and the Tibetan government also assumed the responsibility of the former. The Tibetan note, incorporating the concessions made by the Dogras, was handed to Gulab Singh's representatives. The Persian note, describing the Tibetan concessions, was presented to the Tibetan officials. Three versions of the treaty, including a Tibetan-language treaty in the possession of the Kashmir government, a Persian-language treaty in the possession of the Lhasa authorities, and a treaty document obtained by the agents of the Raja of Bushahr, basically matched with each other even though they had some textural variations. In any event, it was the duty of the Qing imperial resident (Amban) at Lhasa to report these developments to the Chinese Emperor.

This treaty was signed within three weeks of the capitulation of the army of the Qing dynasty at Nanking (Nanjing) and the signing of the Treaty of Nanking on 29 August 1842 which ended the First Opium War. The First Opium War (1839–1842) was fought between the British Empire and the Qing dynasty of China following the Chinese enforcement of their ban on the opium trade, and the British defeated the Chinese by 1842 using technologically superior ships and weapons. The Qing dynasty, as the suzerain of Tibet, was involved in other conflicts, such as the First Opium War, and was unable to conduct a two-front war at this time. But the agreement reached in September 1842 brought Zorawar Singh's ill-fated yet ambitious Dogra adventure into western Tibet to an abrupt end. Although the Dogras sought British support during the Dogra–Tibetan war, the treaty was ultimately signed through negotiations between the primary parties.

The resulting Treaty of Chushul was a simple document with three articles that restored the status quo ante; only the second article stating that "in conformity with ancient usage, Tea and Pashm shall be transmitted by the Ladakh road" could be accepted because it was supposed to give Gulab Singh a monopoly of the shawl wool export trade, the main objective of his campaign in western Tibet. The terms were also summarised in the Ladakh Chronicles as follows. Tibet recognised that Ladakh was annexed to the Sikh Empire, and the Sikh Empire relinquished the ancient Ladakhi claim to western Tibet. Both the sides would remain within their own territories. Biennial Lopchak missions would go on as before. Ladakhi merchants would be allowed to travel to Rudok, Gartok and other places in Tibet and the Tibetan merchants from Changtang would be allowed to go to Ladakh.

The texts of the notes also stated that the "old, established frontiers" between Ladakh and Tibet would be respected, although the texts did not specify their alignment. The Ladakhi king and queen were to be allowed to live in Ladakh peacefully, and it is the Ladakhi king that would send the biennial Lopchak missions to Lhasa rather than the Dogra regime. All trade between the two regions was to be conducted according to "old, established custom". Some accounts suggest that a supplementary treaty with similar provisions was concluded between the Governor of Kashmir, representing the Sikh Empire, and Lhasa officials under the authority of the Emperor of China.

The British defeat of the Sikhs in 1846 resulted in the transfer of the Jammu and Kashmir region including Ladakh to British control, with Gulab Singh recognized as the Maharaja under British suzerainty. In March 1856, a peace treaty between the Tibetans and the Kingdom of Nepal, known as the Treaty of Thapathali, was signed in Nepal following the Nepal–Tibet War (1855–1856), with the approval of the Chinese Amban. Clause 4 of the treaty freed the remaining Sikh prisoners of war still held in Tibetan captivity whom were captured in 1841. This clause was included in the treaty at the behest of Gulab Singh of Kashmir to free the remaining prisoners.

No text appears to have been officially transmitted to the British during the time when the Treaty of Chushul was signed, although the Raja of Bushahr received a version of it. The British did not receive the official text of the treaty until 1889, when the situation on the Sikkim-Tibet border prompted them to closely study the relations between the protectorates and Tibet. Captain Henry Ramsay, the British Joint Commissioner at Leh, then drew up a document whose terms were essentially the same as those of the ruler of Bashahr, although they seemed to indicate a greater degree of Tibetan influence in Ladakh affairs than the British Indian government had suspected. Before 1900, the British Indian government had not yet decided whether this treaty in any way affected its position vis-à-vis the supremacy of Kashmir.

== Sino-Indian border dispute ==
The Treaty of Chushul came into discussion in the 1960s in the context of the Sino-Indian border dispute. The government of India used the treaty to counter the Chinese contention that the border between Ladakh and Tibet had never been delimited. The Indian position was that the reference to "old, established frontiers" meant that the border had been delimited. The Chinese argued that, even if it had been delimited, there is no guarantee that it was the same as the Indian-claimed boundary. It appeared that the British did not consider the Treaty of Chushul a boundary treaty that defined the border of Ladakh in the 19th century, because they started asking China to start negotiations to determine the border as soon as they added the state of Jammu and Kashmir to their empire in 1846. However, they later gave up because Qing China did not respond to the request for reasons of its own.

According to the Indian government, Tibet signed the treaty with Ladakh in 1842 which it considered a boundary treaty, suggesting that the Chinese government previously recognized Tibet's right to conduct foreign relations alone and deal with its own border issues. On the other hand, the government of China acknowledged the existence of the 1842 Treaty of Chushul, but said China had not actually authorised Tibet to sign a border treaty with another country. The Indian government responded that China was involved in the signing of the treaty because the 1842 treaty "was signed by representatives of both the Dalai Lama and the Emperor of China". Although the argument appears to have shown that the Chinese government "signed" the 1842 treaty and allowed Tibet to participate in it in the presence of Chinese representatives, China believed that it was not at all a proof that China had delegated Tibet a general power to independently conclude border agreements with neighbouring countries.

== See also ==
- Treaty of Tingmosgang (1684)
- British expedition to Tibet (1903-4)
- Convention of Lhasa (1904)
- Convention Between Great Britain and China Respecting Tibet (1906)
- Treaty of Amritsar (1846)
- Treaty of Lahore
- Treaty of Thapathali
- Tibet under Qing rule
- History of Ladakh
- History of Kashmir
- China–India relations

== Bibliography ==
- Ahmad, Zahiruddin (1963), "Tibet and Ladakh: A History", Far Eastern Affairs, St. Antony's Papers, vol. 14, Chatto & Windus, pp. 23–58
- Choudhury, Deba Prosad (1996), Trade and Politics in the Himalaya-Karakoram Borderlands, Orient BlackSwan, ISBN 9788125006428
- Fisher, Margaret W.; Rose, Leo E.; Huttenback, Robert A. (1963), Himalayan Battleground: Sino-Indian Rivalry in Ladakh, Praeger – via archive.org
- Gardner, Kyle J. (2021), The Frontier Complex: Geopolitics and the Making of the India-China Border, 1846–1962, Cambridge University Press, ISBN 978-1-108-84059-0
- Huttenback, Robert A. (1961), "Gulab Singh and the Creation of the Dogra State of Jammu, Kashmir, and Ladakh" (PDF), The Journal of Asian Studies, 20 (4): 477–488, doi:10.2307/2049956, JSTOR 2049956, S2CID 162144034, archived from the original (PDF) on 23 November 2018
- Lamb, Alastair (1986) [1960], British India and Tibet 1766–1910 (Second ed.), Routledge – via archive.org
  - Lamb, Alastair (2018) [1960], British India and Tibet 1766–1910 (Library ed.), Routledge, ISBN 978-0-429-81790-8
- McKay, Alex (2003), History of Tibet, Volume 2: The Medieval Period: c.850-1895, Routledge, ISBN 0-415-30843-7 – via archive.org
  - Charak, Sukhdev Singh (2003), "General Zora War Singh (extracts)", ibid, pp. 748–767 – via archive.org
- Malhotra, Iqbal Chand (2020), Red Fear: The China Threat, Bloomsbury Publishing, ISBN 978-93-89867-59-6
- Mehra, Parshotam (1992), An "agreed" frontier: Ladakh and India's northernmost borders, 1846–1947, Oxford University Press, ISBN 978-0-19-562758-9
- Noorani, A.G. (2010), India–China Boundary Problem 1846–1947: History and Diplomacy, Oxford University Press India, doi:10.1093/acprof:oso/9780198070689.001.0001, ISBN 978-0-19-908839-3
- Sarkees, Meredith Reid; Wayman, Frank Whelon (2010), Resort to War: A data guide to inter-state, extra-state, intra-state, and non-state wars, 1816-2007, CQ Press, ISBN 978-0-87289-434-1
- Shakabpa, W. D. (2010), One Hundred Thousand Moons: An Advanced Political History of Tibet, vol. 1, translated by Derek F. Maher, BRILL, ISBN 9789004177888
- Warikoo, K. (2009), "India's gateway to Central Asia: trans-Himalayan trade and cultural movements through Kashmir and Ladakh, 1846–1947", in Warikoo, K. (ed.), Himalayan Frontiers of India: Historical, Geo-Political and Strategic Perspectives, Routledge, ISBN 978-1-134-03294-5
