= Battle of Chushul =

Dogra annexation of Ladakh in 1842

- Part of the Dogra–Tibetan war
Location
Result
Ladakh, India
- Dogra victory
- Tibetan attack on Ladakh repulsed by Rajputs
- Dogra dynasty annexes Ladakh

Belligerents
Sikh Empire: Dogra dynasty	Qing dynasty: Tibet

Commanders and leaders
Gulab Singh; Jawahar Singh; Wazir Lakhpat; Diwan Hari Chand	Gen. Ragasha †

Strength
Unknown	Unknown, but larger

Casualties and losses
Unknown	Unknown

The Battle of Chushul was one of the major engagements of the Dogra–Tibetan war fought between the Dogra dynasty against the Tibetans under the Qing dynasty. The battle was fought on 6 September 1842, and ended with a Dogra victory.

== Background ==
The Dogras under the suizerenity of the Sikh Empire had invaded Tibet in the Dogra–Tibetan war, however lost their general, Zorawar Singh in a battle. Encouraged by the victory, the Tibetans went on to invade Ladakh. The leader of the Dogra dynasty, Gulab Singh immediately sent relief forces and reinforcements, which included Sikh, Dogra and Kashmiri troops.

== Battle ==
The Battle took place on 6 September 1842. The Tibetans invaded Ladakh under the command of General Ragasha. The Tibetans decided upon a night attack, however were found out and could not do any major damage, instead they were pushed back. The Tibetans took shelter in a fortification, which was later attacked by the Dogras but had to withdraw. After four days, there was no clear victor. The Dogras decided to flood the Tibetan camp which was situated in a low level valley, after three days, the Tibetan camps were successfully flooded and had to be abandoned. When the Tibetans fled, the Dogras led several attacks and Wazir Mustaddi were sent to negotiate a truce, the Tibetan men came to the Dogra camped but were made prisoners. Among the seized, Tibetan General Ragasha was killed as an act of vengeance for Zorawar Singh. Another battle took place where the Dogras repulsed the Tibetans, many of the Tibetans being killed.

"all old boundaries of Ladakh...repossessed by the Sikhs."

— Court of Lahore to British agent in Ludhiana,

== Aftermath ==
Upon hearing of this struggle, Raja Gulab Singh had sent 4,000 reinforcements. However, upon hearing of the victory at Ladakh, they halted their march. Gulab Singh himself arrived in Leh shortly afterwards, and ordered the building of a new fort in Leh, replacing the old one. Gulab Singh also sent vakils (agents) to negotiate peace treaties with the Tibetan chiefs.
