= Mehta Basti Ram =

Dogra military officer and governor of Ladakh in 19th-century India

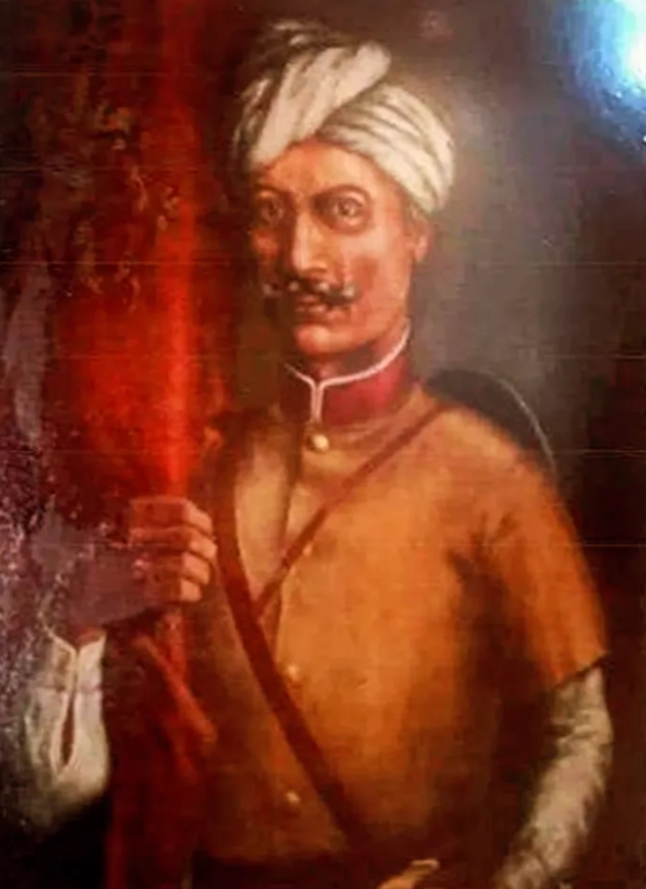
- Zorawar Fort Ladakh, where Basti Ram was the first Qiladar (commandant)

Governor of Leh
- In office 1847–1861
- Preceded by: Zorawar Singh
- Succeeded by: Mehta Mangal (son)

Personal details
- Born: Early 19th century Kishtwar, Jammu, Sikh Empire
- Died: Late 19th century Kishtwar, Jammu and Kashmir, British Raj
- Spouse: Unknown
- Children: Mehta Mangal; Krishna Mehta (great-granddaughter), Om Mehta (great-grandson)
- Occupation: Military officer, Governor

Military service
- Allegiance: Jammu and Kashmir
- Rank: Colonel
- Unit: Fateh Shibji Battalion
- Battles/wars: Dogra invasion of Ladakh, Dogra–Tibetan War

Mehta Basti Ram was a Dogra officer and commander of the Fateh Shibji battalion under Raja Gulab Singh of Jammu (later Maharaja of Jammu and Kashmir). Basti Ram later served as the governor (thanadar) of Leh in Ladakh between 1847 and 1861. Basti Ram joined the service of Raja Gulab Singh in 1821 and became an officer under General Zorawar Singh during his conquest of Ladakh between 1834 and 1841. After holding positions such as the governor of Taklakot (briefly) and thanadar of Zanskar, he became the second governor of Leh under Maharaja Gulab Singh.

== Life ==
In 1821, when Gulab Singh, the Raja of Jammu under the Sikh Empire, conquered Kishtwar, Basti Ram joined his service and was soon under General Zorawar Singh. At a rank of Colonel, he led Zorawar Singh's Jangi Fauj, later reorganised and renamed as the Fateh Shibji force (Note: Also referred to as 8 Shibji Paltan later reorganised into the 7 Shibji.) from 1834 to 1841. Fateh Shibji went on to become the 4th Battalion of the Jammu and Kashmir Rifles Regiment (it retains the historic name Fateh Shibji). Major General G. D. Bakshi wrote in 2002 that Basti Ram was a "tactician par excellence" and that he "should be a role model for Indian battalion commanders".

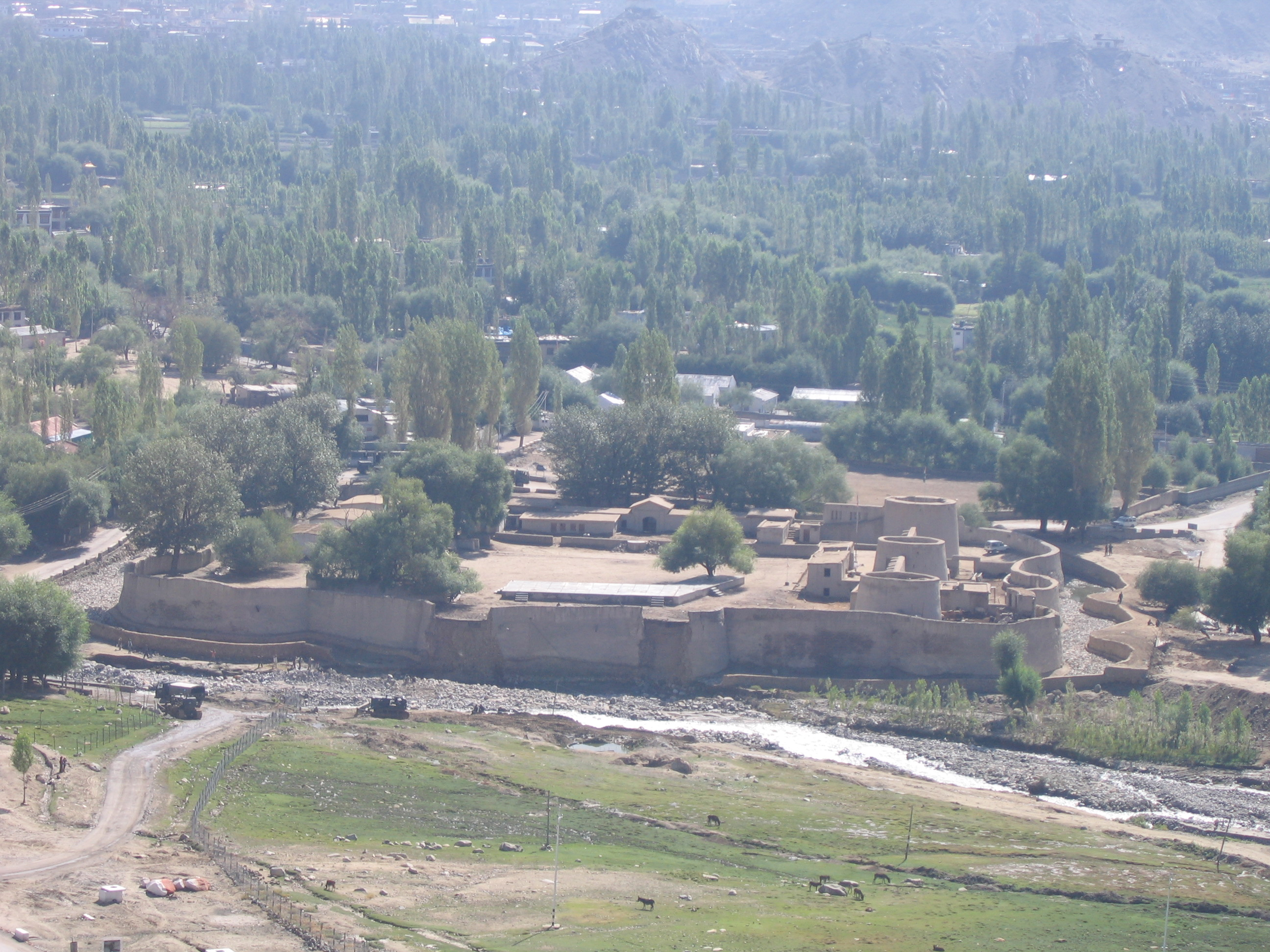
Zorawar fort in Ladakh. Basti Ram was the first Qiladar (commandant).

=== Dogra conquest of Ladakh ===
Basti Ram was one of the main officers of Zorawar's force and played a crucial role at multiple locations in the conquest of Ladakh which started in 1834. He led an attack that resulted in the capture of the Fort of Sod/Soth (in Kargil) and subsequently the Gyalpo. The assault included crossing the Indus River on inflated goatskins. During the conquest of Baltistan, which started during the end of 1840, he found a way to cross a river that had caused Zorawar's army to halt for over a month in the cold and snow. For this innovation, Zorawar Singh gifted Basti Ram Rs. 500 and a pair of gold bangles. (Note: G. D. Bakshi writes that this bridgehead operation deserves to be "a classic" in "military history books".) Basti Ram was also present during the capture of Skardu.

After Zorawar Singh's forces captured Western Tibet, Basti Ram was appointed the governor of Taklakot (Burang). Soon afterwards, the Tibetans launched a counterattack during winter. Zorawar Singh was killed on 12 December 1941 and his army was defeated. The men stationed at Taklakot fled to the British province of Kumaon. Basti Ram escaped to Almora where the British commissioner gave him shelter. By the autumn of 1846, Basti Ram was appointed the thanadar of Zanskar and "one of the confidential servants of Maharaja Gulab Sing.

Basti Ram provided one of the earliest written accounts of the Dogra conquest of Ladakh and beyond, twelve years after the events. While the original version was lost, Alexander Cunningham had re-written Basti Ram's account based on a dictation by Basti Ram himself. August Hermann Francke notes that Basti Ram may have exaggerated the enemy numbers at certain locations.

=== Governor of Leh ===
Basti Ram was appointed the thanadar of Leh between 1847 and 1861. At the time there were four thanadars for Ladakh, in Zanskar, Kargil, Dras and Nubra. All the thanadars had military and civil authority in their districts and were accountable directly to the Maharaja. Alexander Cunningham estimated that Basti Ram's income would have been a "respectable" Rs.18,000 annually, (roughly £1,800 a year). Lieutenant Colonel Henry Torrens, who passed through Ladakh in 1862, noted that Basti Ram had retired to his home in Kishtawar on account of old age, and a successor had not yet been appointed by the Maharaja". Instead, Torrens met the Kahlon (Note: Also spelt Kahlon. Old Tibetan title signifying Prime Minister. Cunningham notes that "the term is also applied to the chief men of all the districts.") of Leh, the "nominal governor", who got little respect from the Sikhs [Dogras].

== Family ==
Basti Ram was born in the Mehta family from Kishtwar. His grandfather had been in charge of military affairs under the last Kishtwar ruler Mohammad Teg Singh. Basti Ram's son Mehta Mangal succeeded him as Governor of Ladakh.

Basti Ram's great-granddaughter was Krishna Mehta, who went on to become the first woman member of parliament from Jammu and Kashmir. Krishna Mehta had been married to Duni Chand Mehta who was appointed as the wazir-e-wazarat of Muzaffarabad. In October 1947, Duni Chand was killed by Pashtun tribal militias, and Krishna Mehta was taken prisoner and eventually repatriated by Pakistan. Krishna Mehta's brother Om Mehta served as a Minister of State for Home Affairs in Indira Gandhi's government in 1976. Another younger brother Ved Mehta was at one time the president of Chamber of Commerce and Industry Jammu.
