= Dogra–Tibetan war =

1841–1842 war between the Dogra State of Jammu and Tibet

Dogra–Tibetan War
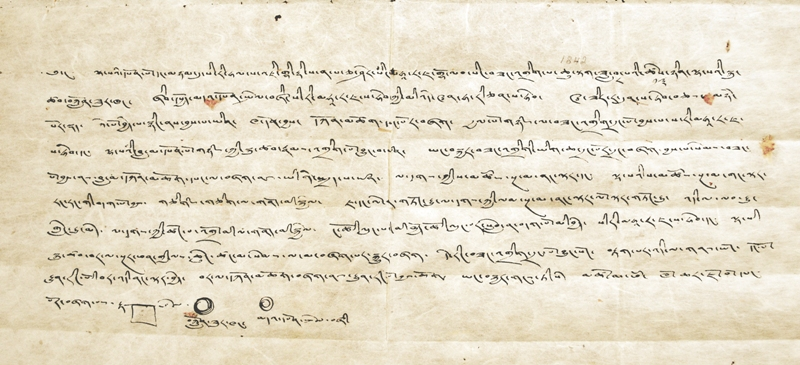
Date	May 1841 – August 1842
Location	Tibet and Ladakh
Result	Treaty of Chushul
Territorial changes	status quo ante bellum

Belligerents
Qing dynasty: Tibet	Sikh Empire: Dogra dynasty

Commanders and leaders
(Tibet) Khedrup Gyatso; (Tibet) Palden Nyima; (Tibet) Minister Pellhün; (Tibet) General Pi-Hsi; (Tibet) Banka Kahloon (WIA); (Tibet) Bazgoo Kahloon (POW); (Tibet) Moru Tadsi (POW); (Tibet) General Mandal †; (Tibet) General Ragasha (executed)	Sher Singh; Gulab Singh; Zorawar Singh †; Hari Chand; Wazir Lakhpat; Jawahir Singh; Mehta Basti Ram

Strength
25,000 Tibetan Army	4,000

Dogra–Tibetan war
- Traditional Chinese: 森巴戰爭
- Simplified Chinese: 森巴战争
- Literal meaning: Dogra War
Transcriptions
Standard Mandarin
- Hanyu Pinyin: Sēnbā Zhànzhēng

The Dogra–Tibetan war, also called the Sino–Sikh war, was fought from May 1841 to August 1842 between the Dogra-led Kingdom of Jammu, under the suzerainty of the Sikh Empire, and Tibet, a protectorate of Qing China. The Dogra ruler Gulab Singh's commander was the general Zorawar Singh, who, after the conquest of Ladakh, attempted to extend its boundaries in order to control the trade routes into Ladakh. Zorawar Singh's campaign, suffering from the effects of inclement weather, suffered a defeat at Taklakot (Purang) and Singh was killed. The Tibetans then advanced on Ladakh. Gulab Singh sent reinforcements under the command of his nephew Jawahir Singh. A subsequent battle near Chushul in 1842 led to a Tibetan defeat. A treaty was signed in 1842 maintaining the status quo ante bellum.

== Background ==
=== Ladakh trade ===
In the 19th century, Ladakh was the hub of trade routes that branched out into Turkestan and Tibet. Its trade with Tibet was governed by the 1684 Treaty of Tingmosgang, by which Ladakh had the exclusive right to receive the pashmina wool produced in Tibet. The famous Kashmir shawl industry received its pashm wool supplies from Ladakh.

=== Political environment ===
In the early 1800s, the Kashmir Valley and the adjoining Jammu region were part of the Sikh Empire. But the Dogras of Jammu were virtually autonomous under the rule of Raja Gulab Singh, who was positioning himself to take control of Kashmir and all the surrounding areas after the passing of Sikh monarch Maharaja Ranjit Singh. In 1834, Gulab Singh sent his ablest general and Kishtwar governor, Zorawar Singh, to take control of all the territory between Jammu and the Tibet border, leading to the conquest of Ladakh and Baltistan. By 1840, Ladakh and Baltistan were firmly under Dogra control, subject to the suzerainty of the Sikh Empire.

The British East India Company was the predominant power in the Indian subcontinent at the time. It treated the Sikh Empire as a valuable ally against the Afghans, but it also had designs for its own pashmina trade with Tibet. Zorawar Singh's conquest of Ladakh broke the Kashmiri–Ladakhi monopoly on Tibet trade, and the Tibetan pashmina wool started finding its way into British territory. To regain the monopoly, Gulab Singh and Zorawar Singh turned their eyes towards Tibet.

From the early 18th century, Tibet had been under the protectorate of the Manchu-led Qing dynasty. A Qing Amban (imperial resident) was stationed in Lhasa to report on the affairs of Tibet. Nevertheless, Qing China was fighting the First Opium War (1839–1842) with the British Empire when the Dogra invasion of Tibet took place.

== Dogra invasion of Tibet ==
Locations of Dogra–Tibetan war

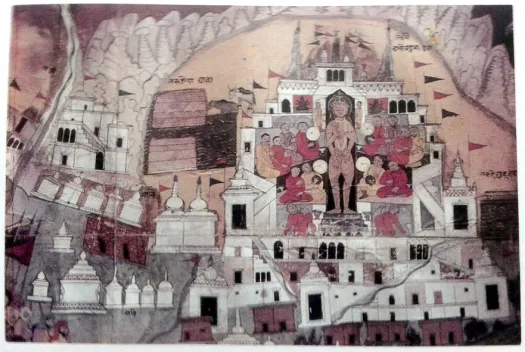
A Buddhist shrine in Ladakh, detail from a painted scroll. In the bottom left corner can be seen Zorawar Singh's army, looking on

Zorawar Singh led a 4,000 men-strong force consisting of Ladakhis, Baltis and Kishtwaris with a Dogra core. The Tibetan estimate was 6,000 men. The Dogra forces had matchlocks and guns, while the Tibetans were mostly armed with bows, swords and spears.

Zorawar Singh divided his forces into three divisions, sending one via the Rupshu and Hanle, one along the Indus valley towards Tashigang (Zhaxigang) and another along the Pangong Tso towards Rudok (Rutog). The first two contingents plundered the Buddhist monasteries at Hanle and Tashigang. (Note: According to Cunningham, the commander responsible for the destruction of monasteries was Ghulam Khan, the son-in-law of Rahim Khan. After his capture by the Tibetans, he was tortured to death.) The third division, commanded by Zorawar Singh, captured Rudok and then moved south, joining the other branches to attack Gartok.

The Tibetan border officials had, by then, sent an alert to Lhasa. The Tibetan government dispatched a force under the command of cabinet minister Pellhün. Meanwhile, Zorawar Singh had captured Gartok as well as Taklakot (Burang) near Nepal border. The Tibetan general at Taklakot was unable to hold the town and retreated to the Mayum La, the border between Western and Central Tibet.

Zorawar Singh invoked the historical claims of Ladakh to Western Tibet up to the Mayum Pass (originally called Ngari), which were exercised prior to the 1648 Treaty of Tingmosgang. All the captured forts were garrisoned, while the main force was encamped at Tirthapuri near Minsar, to the west of Lake Manasarovar. Administration was set up to rule the occupied territories. Minsar (also called Missar or Menshi), a Ladakhi enclave in Western Tibet, was used to store supplies.

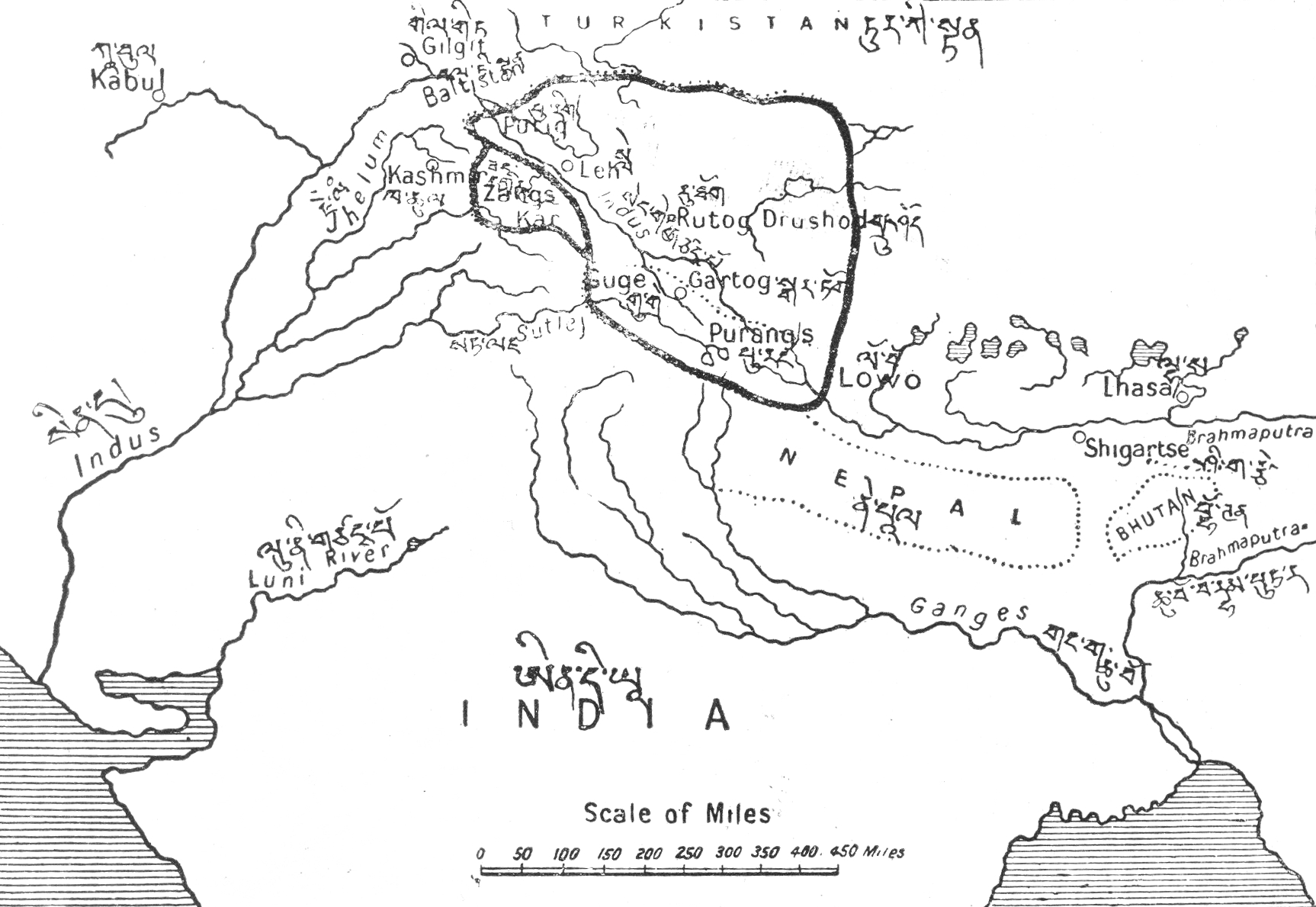
Ladakh's historical claim to west Tibet (A. H. Francke, 1907)

The Chinese Amban at Lhasa reported to the emperor on 2 September 1841:

It has been learned that south of Ladakh there is a very large aboriginal tribe named Ren-chi-shen [Ranjit Singh]. Subordinate to this tribe are two smaller tribes-- Sa-re-shen [Sher Singh] and Ko-lang-shen [Gulab Singh], who together are known as the Shen-pa ["Singh people", possibly referring Sikhs and Dogra Rajputs together]. After the death of the Ladakhi ruler [Tshe-pal Nam-gyal], a certain Ladakhi chieftain had secret connections with the Shen-pa, who then occupied Ladakh. Now this Ladakhi chieftain is once again in league with the Shen-pa aborigines who have invaded Tibetan territory, occupied two of our military posts at Gartok and Rudok, and claimed the territory west of the Mayum that had formerly belonged to Ladakh. Actually they intended to occupy more territory than this.

=== British and Nepalese reactions ===
The Dogra conquest of Ladakh had been previously advantageous to the British. The disturbances in Ladakh caused the Tibetan shawl wool to be diverted to the princely state of Bushahr, a British dependency. But, now with the Dogra conquest of the Western Tibet, this trade was disrupted. The advance of Zorawar Singh's troops gave rise to vociferous complaints from the British to the Lahore durbar of the Sikh Empire. It was also reported that Zorawar Singh was exacting taxes from Bhotias under British protection in the Byans Valley. The British demanded that this should be immediately stopped and the villagers already assessed should be compensated.

Added to those concerns was the possibility of intercourse between the Dogras and the Nepalese, which might have encircled British territory in Kumaon and Garhwal. But such a relationship did not materialise. The Nepalese were sympathetic to the Ladakhis and also had ongoing relationships with the Tibetans. Even though they sent a mission to Zorawar Singh after his conquest of Taklakot, nothing further came out of it. Winter sojourn to the Dogras was refused.

Nevertheless, the British were apprehensive. The Governor General brought heavy pressure on the Sikhs to recall Zorawar Singh from Tibet, and set 10 December 1841 as the deadline.

=== Winter debacle ===
Fisher et al. state that, with the winter approaching, the Dogras were not inimical to withdrawing in strength if they could make a deal with the Tibetans. But they appear to have made too high demands for the Tibetans to accept. Sukhdev Singh Charak states that the Lahore Durbar responded to the British demands and ordered Zorawar Singh to return to Ladakh. In response, Zorawar Singh withdrew officers and troops from "advance posts" and from the British border, and promised to carry out the rest of the withdrawal after the snows cleared. Charak opines that these military movements, made to appease the British, weakened Zorawar Singh's position.

Tibetan reinforcements arrived in November in considerable numbers. Alexander Cunningham estimated 10,000 troops. (Note: Sources state that Zorawar Singh had 3,000 troops at this stage. So he was outnumbered 3 to 1.) The Mayum Pass was covered with snow, but the troops bypassed it via Matsang. After severe fighting, Taklakot was retaken on 9 November 1841. Detachments were sent forward to cut Dogra communication lines. Reconnaissance missions sent by Zorawar Singh were annihilated.

Eventually, Zorawar Singh decided to risk everything in an all-out campaign to recapture Taklakot. Fighting raged indecisively for three weeks. In an attempt to cut the supply lines of the Tibetan forces at Taklakot, Zorawar Singh's forces marched on a side route from Minsar, along the upper course of the Karnali River, and encamped at Kardung (Kardam). The Tibetans calculated that they intended to intercept the supply line at a place called Do-yo, slightly to the north of Taklakot. According to the Tibetan report from the battlefield:

The final battle in Tibet

During this period, there was a great snowstorm and snow accumulated to the depth of several feet. A well-disguised ambush was carefully laid, in which a road was left open through the middle of our lines up which the enemy could advance. The invaders marched on Do-yo from 7 A.M. to 9 A.M. on the second day, 11th month [14 December 1841]. These forces included the troops stationed at their new fort at Chi-t'ang in addition to the force led by the Wazir [Zorawar Singh], the Shen-pa commander. They advanced in three units with flags flying and drums beating. General Pi-hsi led his troops to resist their advance. The invaders fell into the ambush that had been prepared and their rearguard was cut off and could not maneuver. They were attacked by our forces from all sides.

Zorawar Singh was wounded in the battle, but he continued to fight with a sword. He was beheaded by Tibetan soldiers. Three hundred of the Dogra troops were killed in combat and about seven hundred were captured, the descendants of whom lived in Tibet for many generations, most of whom converting to Islam. The rest fled to Ladakh. The Tibetans pursued them up to Dumra (Nubra Valley, possibly Durbuk), a day's journey from Leh, where they encamped.

== Tibetan invasion of Ladakh ==
The Sino-Tibetan force then mopped up the other garrisons of the Dogras and advanced on Ladakh, now determined to conquer it and add it to the Imperial Chinese dominions. However the force under Mehta Basti Ram withstood a siege for several weeks at Chi-T’ang before escaping with 240 men across the Himalayas to the British post of Almora. Within Ladakh the Sino-Tibetan army laid siege to Leh, when reinforcements under Diwan Hari Chand and Wazir Ratnu arrived from Jammu and repulsed them. The Tibetan fortifications at Drangtse were flooded when the Dogras dammed up the river. On open ground, the Chinese and Tibetans were chased to Chushul. The climactic Battle of Chushul (August 1842) was won by the Dogras, who killed the Tibetan army's general to avenge the death of Zorawar Singh.

== Peace treaty ==
On 17 September 1842, a peace treaty was agreed in Leh between the Dogras and the Tibetans, executed by an exchange of notes. (Note: The treaty is often referred to as the Treaty of Chushul, although there is no indication that the treaty was agreed at Chushul.) The Tibetan note, incorporating the concessions made by the Dogras, was handed to Gulab Singh's representatives. The Persian note, describing the Tibetan concessions, was presented to the Tibetan officials. The terms were also summarised in the Ladakh Chronicles as follows. Tibet recognised that Ladakh was annexed to the Sikh Empire. And the Sikh Empire relinquished the ancient Ladakhi claim to western Tibet. Both sides would remain within their own territories. Biennial Lopchak missions would go on as before. Ladakhi merchants would be allowed to travel to Rudok, Gartok and other places in Tibet and the Tibetan merchants from Chang Thang would be allowed to go to Ladakh.

The texts of the notes also state that the "old, established frontiers" between Ladakh and Tibet would be respected. The Ladakhi king and queen were to be allowed to live in Ladakh peacefully, and the Ladakhi king would send the biennial Lopchak missions, to Lhasa rather than the Dogra regime. All trade between the two regions was to be conducted according to "old, established custom".

== Aftermath ==
The descendants of the Sikh and Dogra troops in Tibet after capture started living in Lhasa without coming back to India, they had married Tibetan women and started living there, working as farmers and butchers, introducing grapes, peaches, apricots and apples into the country. Many of their descendants converted to Islam, and the butchers of the subsequent Dalai Lamas were "Singpa Khache", as they were known.

In March 1856, a treaty between Tibet and the Kingdom of Nepal, known as the Treaty of Thapathali, was signed. Clause 4 of the treaty freed the remaining Sikh/Dogra prisoners-of-war still held in Tibetan captivity whom were captured in 1841. This clause was included in the treaty at the behest of Gulab Singh of Kashmir to free the remaining prisoners, possibly for political capital. Of the original soldiers whom were taken as prisoners by the Tibetans, 34 could not be located but 106 were successfully assembled in Kathmandu at the British residence. However, only 56 of these mustered 106 original soldiers wished to return to India and the rest opted to remain in Tibet, as many had since settled in southern Tibet since the war, had married local women and thus now had a family, and were running businesses. The 56 former POWs who opted to return were each awarded with silver medals bearing a bust of Maharaja Surendra Bikram Shah of Nepal and a robe of honour. In 1857 there was a correspondence between Raja Gulab Singh and the Sikhs and Dogras left in Lhasa, though nothing came from it, he wanted them to return to his state.

The treaty came into discussion in the 1960s in the context of the Sino-Indian border dispute. The Indian government used the treaty to counter the Chinese contention that the border between Ladakh and Tibet had never been delimited. The Indian position was that the reference to "old, established frontiers" meant that the border had been delimited. The Chinese argued that even if it had been delimited, there is no guarantee that it was the same as the border claimed by India.

== See also ==
- Tibet–Ladakh–Mughal war
- Nepalese–Tibetan War
- Sino-Nepalese War
- Tibet under Qing rule
- Sino-Indian War
